= Malcolm Sargent discography =

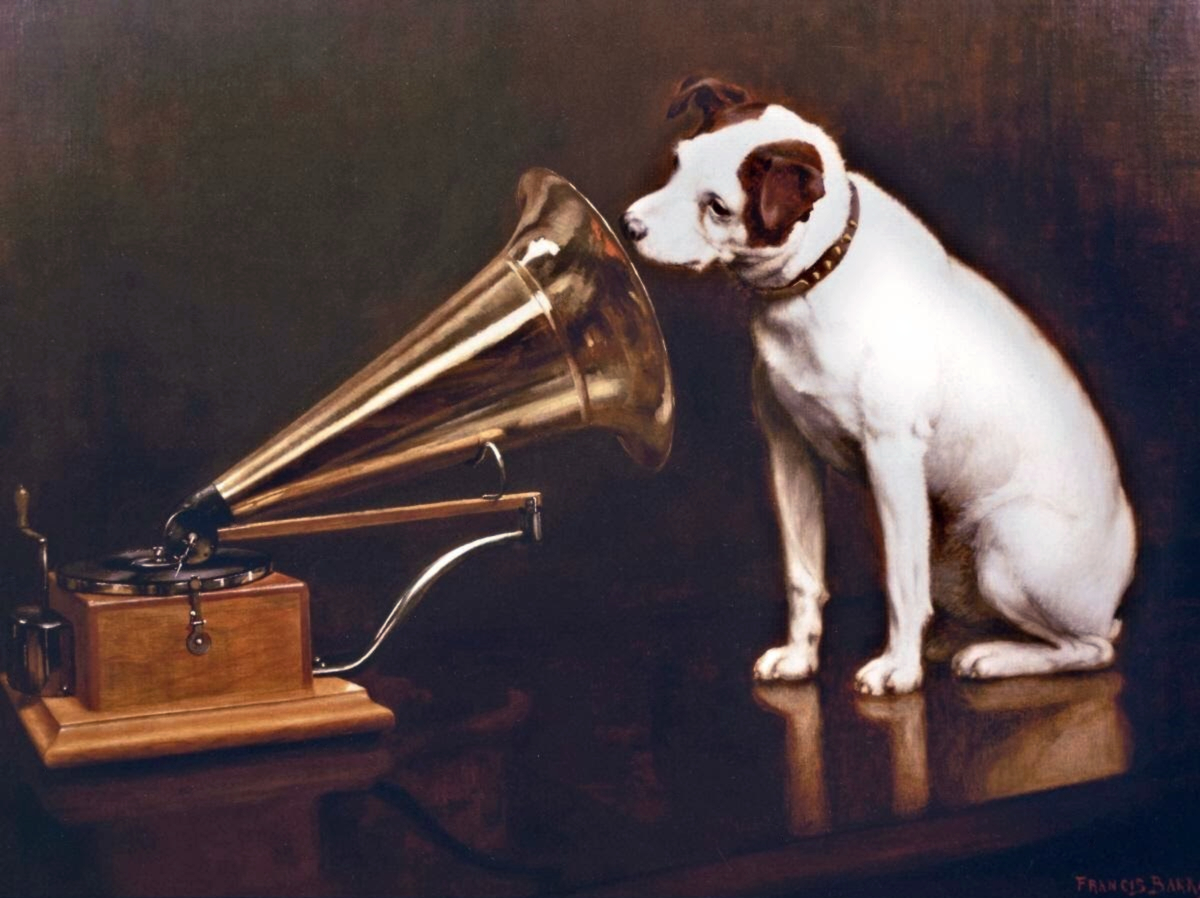
His Master's Voice, Sargent's main recording company from 1924 to 1967

The conductor Malcolm Sargent's career as a recording artist began in the days of acoustic recording, shortly before the introduction of the microphone and electrical recording, and continued into the stereo LP era. He recorded prolifically from 1924 until 1967, the year of his death.

== Description of Sargent's recordings ==
Sargent's debut recording was Vaughan Williams's Hugh the Drover, in 1924, for His Master's Voice, with singers from the British National Opera Company, with whom he was then performing the work on tour. Although he recorded for other companies, most of his records were made for His Master's Voice over the following four decades.

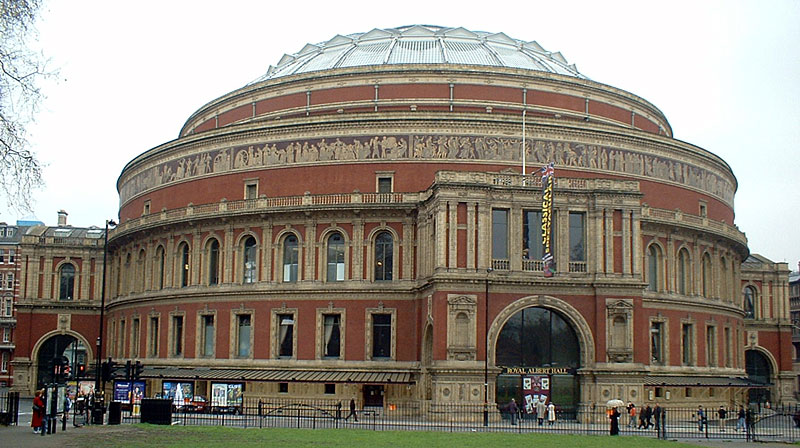
Royal Albert Hall, an early recording venue for Sargent

In the early days of electrical recording, he took part in pioneering live recordings with the Royal Choral Society at the Albert Hall. Subsequently, in the recording studio, Sargent was most in demand to record English music, choral works and concertos. He recorded and worked with many orchestras, but made the most recordings (several dozen major pieces) with the BBC Symphony Orchestra, the London Symphony Orchestra, the Philharmonia Orchestra and the Royal Philharmonic Orchestra. In the recording studio, as in the concert hall, Sargent was known for his choral conducting and was in demand as an accompanist in concertos. A high proportion of the recordings listed below are in these categories.

Sargent's choral work was chiefly with the two choirs of which he was the principal conductor, the Royal Choral Society and the Huddersfield Choral Society. For his recordings with the latter, Sargent usually conducted the Liverpool Philharmonic (from 1957, the Royal Liverpool Philharmonic); the pairing of the choir and orchestra became so familiar that the portmanteau word "Hudderspool" was coined for it. Sargent's choral recordings included two versions of Elgar's The Dream of Gerontius, four of Handel's Messiah, two of Mendelssohn's Elijah, and complete sets of Coleridge-Taylor's Hiawatha's Wedding Feast and The Death of Minnehaha, Delius's Songs of Farewell, Handel's Israel in Egypt, Holst's The Hymn of Jesus, Vaughan Williams's Serenade to Music and Walton's Belshazzar's Feast. Some of these have been reissued on compact disc, including both Gerontius sets, three of the Messiah recordings, one of the Elijahs, and Belshazzar's Feast.

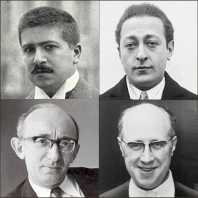
Four of the many soloists who recorded concertos with Sargent: Artur Schnabel (top l.), Jascha Heifetz (top r.), Clifford Curzon (lower l.) and Mstislav Rostropovich.

As a concerto accompanist, Sargent recorded with, among many others, Fritz Kreisler, Artur Schnabel, Jascha Heifetz, Albert Sammons, Clifford Curzon, David Oistrakh, Mstislav Rostropovich, Paul Tortelier, and Jacqueline du Pré. His pre-war recordings with Schnabel of the Beethoven piano concertos have been reissued on compact disc. His association with Heifetz spanned the 78 r.p.m., mono LP and stereo LP eras, and many of their recordings are also available in CD transfers.

Throughout his career, Sargent remained devoted to Gilbert and Sullivan and made 21 recordings of their operas in four different decades. His earliest and last recordings of these works were with the D'Oyly Carte Opera Company for HMV in the 1920s and 30s and for Decca in the 1960s. In the 1950s and early 60s he conducted a series of Gilbert and Sullivan recordings for HMV, casting singers from opera and oratorio, rather than the D'Oyly Carte. All of his Gilbert and Sullivan recordings have been re-released on compact disc, and most remain in the catalogues.

== Sources and abbreviations ==
The sources for this discography are primarily The Gramophone, 1924 onwards; the discography published in Sir Malcolm Sargent: a tribute. (1967). London: Daily Mirror Newspapers, and A Gilbert and Sullivan Discography.

The following abbreviations are used in this list.

- BBCSO – BBC Symphony Orchestra
- LPO – London Philharmonic Orchestra
- LSO – London Symphony Orchestra
- RPO – Royal Philharmonic Orchestra
- VPO – Vienna Philharmonic Orchestra

== Discography ==
- Arne
  - Rule, Britannia! (arr Sargent): Royal Choral Society, Philharmonia, HMV 1953
- Auber
  - Zanetta Overture: Orchestra of the Royal Opera House, Covent Garden, HMV, 1931
- Bach
  - Double Violin Concerto: Jascha Heifetz, Erick Friedman, New Symphony Orchestra, RCA, 1962
- H. Balfour Gardiner
  - Shepherd Fennel's Dance: Royal Liverpool Philharmonic, Columbia, 1947
- Bartók
  - Violin Concerto: Max Rostal, LSO, Decca, 1951
- Bax
  - Coronation March: LSO, Decca, 1953
  - May-time in Sussex: Harriet Cohen, Orchestra, Columbia, 1947

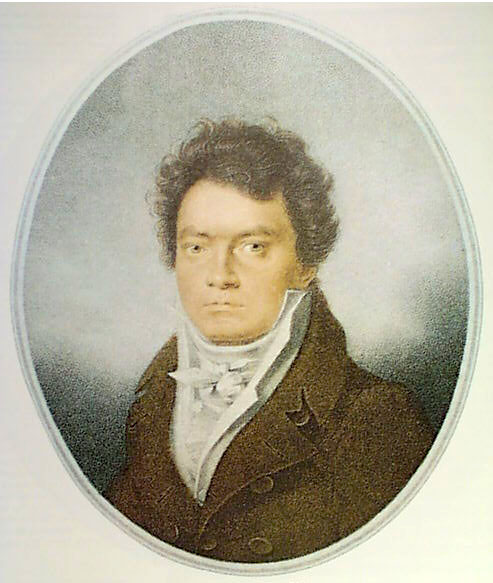
Ludwig van Beethoven

- Beethoven
  - Piano Concerto No 1: Artur Schnabel, LSO, HMV, 1932
  - Piano Concerto No 2: Artur Schnabel, LPO, HMV, 1935
  - Piano Concerto No 3
    - Mark Hambourg, LPO, HMV, 1930
    - Artur Schnabel, LPO, HMV, 1933
    - Benno Moiseiwitsch, Philharmonia, 1952
  - Piano Concerto No 4: Artur Schnabel, LPO, HMV, 1933
  - Piano Concerto No 5: Artur Schnabel, LSO, HMV, 1932
  - Symphony No 3: RPO, HMV, 1961
  - Triple Concerto: David Oistrakh, Alexander Knushevitzky, Lev Oborin, Philharmonia, Columbia, 1959
  - (arr Weniger) Moonlight Sonata – first movement; Sonata Pathétique – slow movement: New Light Symphony Orchestra, HMV, 1931
- Berlioz
  - Béatrice et Bénédict Overture: National Symphony Orchestra, Decca, 1947
  - Roman Carnival Overture: RPO, HMV, 1961
- Bizet
  - Carmen – Flower Song: Heddle Nash, Liverpool Philharmonic, HMV, 1945
  - L'Arlésienne Suite
    - Hallé, Columbia, 1942
    - Philharmonia, Columbia, 1949
  - Patrie: New Symphony Orchestra, HMV, 1932
- Bliss
  - Piano Concerto: Trevor Barnard, Philharmonia, HMV, 1962
- Boccherini
  - Minuet (arr from Quintet in E, Op 11/5): New Symphony Orchestra, HMV, 1929
- Borodin
  - Nocturne for String Orchestra (arr Sargent): Philharmonia, Columbia, 1950
- Brahms
  - Academic Festival Overture: Liverpool Philharmonic, Columbia, 1948
  - Hungarian Dance No 5: Liverpool Philharmonic, Columbia, 1948
  - Variations on a Theme by Haydn: Hallé, Columbia, 1943
- Britten
  - Peter Grimes – Four Sea Interludes: LSO, Columbia, 1948
  - Simple Symphony: RPO, 1962
  - Variations and Fugue on a Theme by Purcell (The Young Person's Guide to the Orchestra)
    - Liverpool Philharmonic, Columbia, 1947
    - BBCSO, HMV, 1962
- Bruch
  - Scottish Fantasy: Jascha Heifetz, LSO, RCA 1954
  - Violin Concerto No 1: Jascha Heifetz, LSO, RCA, 1954
- Chabrier
  - Le roi malgré lui – Fête Polonaise: BBCSO, HMV, 1959
- Chopin
  - Piano Concerto No 1: Earl Wild, RPO, Reader's Digest, 1965
  - Les Sylphides (arr J Ainslie Murray and Felix White): LPO, HMV, 1941
  - Les Sylphides (arr Sargent): Orchestra of the Royal Opera House, Covent Garden, HMV, 1963
- Cimarosa
  - Concerto for Oboe and Strings (arr Arthur Benjamin): Léon Goossens, Liverpool Philharmonic, HMV, 1943

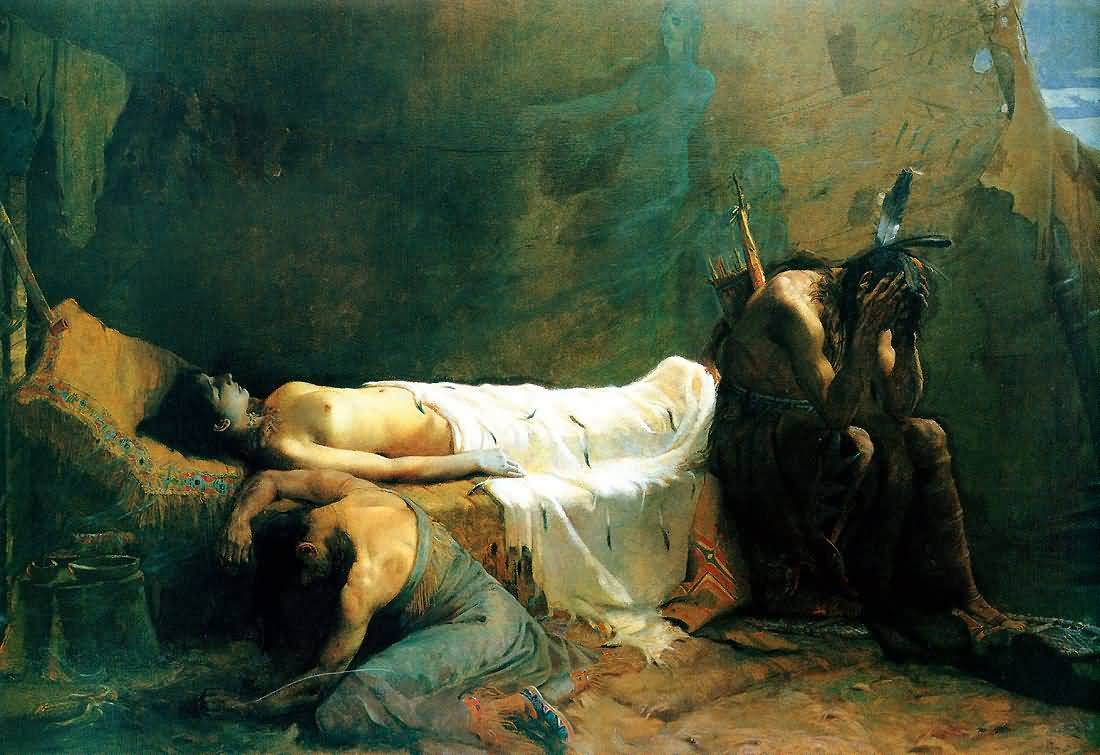
The Death of Minnehaha (1892) by William de Leftwich Dodge

- Coleridge-Taylor
  - Hiawatha's Wedding Feast
    - Walter Glynne, Royal Choral Society, orchestra, HMV, 1930
    - Richard Lewis, Royal Choral Society, Philharmonia, HMV, 1962
    - – Onaway! Awake, Beloved!: Webster Booth, Liverpool Philharmonic, HMV, 1945
  - The Death of Minnehaha: Elsie Suddaby, Howard Fry, George Baker, Royal Choral Society, Orchestra, HMV, 1931
- Delius
  - A Song Before Sunrise: RPO, HMV, 1965
  - Cello Concerto: Jacqueline du Pré, RPO, HMV, 1965
  - On Hearing the First Cuckoo in Spring: Liverpool Philharmonic, Columbia, 1950
  - Songs of Farewell: Royal Choral Society, RPO, HMV, 1965
  - Violin Concerto: Albert Sammons, Liverpool Philharmonic, Columbia, 1945
- Dohnányi
  - Suite for Orchestra
    - LSO, Columbia, 1951
    - RPO, HMV, 1962
  - Variations on a Nursery Song
    - Cyril Smith, Liverpool Philharmonic, Columbia, 1945
    - Cyril Smith, Philharmonia, HMV, 1954
- Dvořák
  - Cello Concerto: Paul Tortelier, Philharmonia, HMV, 1956
  - Serenade in E major: RPO, HMV, 1966
  - Slavonic Dances Nos 1 and 3: Orchestra of the Royal Opera House, Covent Garden, HMV, 1933
  - Slavonic Dance No 10: BBCSO, HMV, 1959
  - Symphonic Variations: BBCSO, HMV, 1959
  - The Spectre's Bride – Where art Thou Father dear?: Isobel Baillie, Philharmonia, HMV, 1948
  - Violin Concerto: Ruggiero Ricci, LSO, Decca, 1961

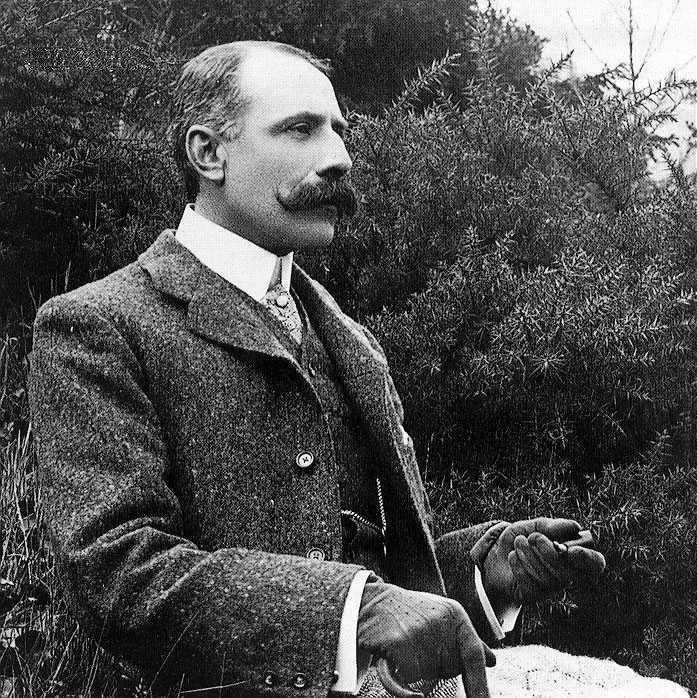
Edward Elgar

- Elgar
  - Cello Concerto: Paul Tortelier, BBCSO, HMV, 1954
  - The Dream of Gerontius
    - Heddle Nash, Gladys Ripley, Dennis Noble, Norman Walker, Huddersfield Choral Society, Liverpool Philharmonic, HMV, 1945
    - Richard Lewis, Marjorie Thomas, John Cameron, Huddersfield Choral Society, Liverpool Philharmonic, HMV 1955
  - Enigma Variations
    - LSO, Decca, 1953
    - Philharmonia, HMV, 1960
  - Imperial March: LSO, Decca, 1953
  - Nursery Suite – The Serious Doll: Liverpool Philharmonic, Columbia, 1943
  - Pomp and Circumstance March No 1
    - LSO, Decca, 1953
    - Philharmonia, Columbia, 1949
    - BBCSO, HMV, 1959
  - Pomp and Circumstance March No 4
    - Philharmonia, Columbia, 1949
    - LSO, Decca, 1953
  - The Kingdom – The Sun Goeth Down: Isobel Baillie, Philharmonia, Columbia, 1948
  - Violin Concerto: Jascha Heifetz, LSO, HMV, 1950
  - The Wand of Youth, Suite No 2
    - Liverpool Philharmonic, Columbia, 1950
    - BBCSO, HMV, 1953
- Falla
  - The Three-Cornered Hat – Suite: New Light Symphony Orchestra, HMV, 1928
- Fauré
  - Pavane: Chorus, Philharmonia, 1947
- German
  - March Rhapsody: LSO, HMV, 1932
  - Merrymakers' Dance: New Symphony Orchestra, HMV, 1929
  - Tom Jones orchestral suite: Orchestra, HMV, 1932
- Gluck
  - Orfeo ed Euridice – What is life?: Kathleen Ferrier, LSO, Decca, 1946
- Gounod
  - Faust – All hail, thou dwelling!: Heddle Nash, Liverpool Philharmonic, HMV, 1945
- Grainger
  - Handel in the Strand: New Light Symphony Orchestra, HMV, 1931
  - Mock Morris: New Light Symphony Orchestra, HMV, 1931
- Grieg
  - Lyric Suite: National Symphony Orchestra, Decca, 1948

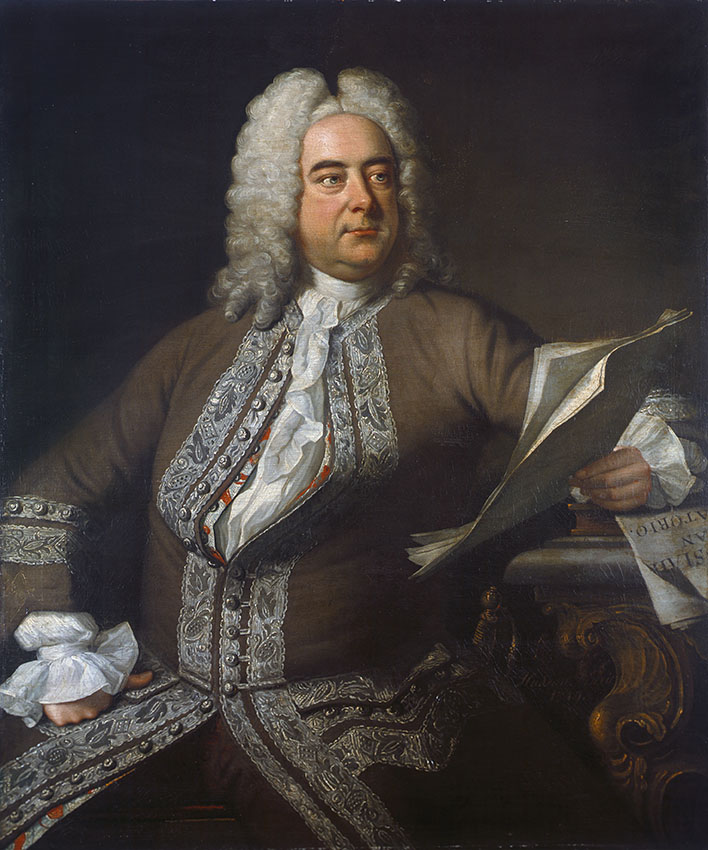
George Frideric Handel

- Handel
  - Acis and Galatea
    - – Would you gain: Richard Lewis, LSO, HMV, 1958
    - – O Didst Thou Know? As When the Dove: Isobel Baillie, Liverpool Philharmonic, Columbia, 1945
  - Alexander's Feast
    - – Revenge, Timotheous cries: Trevor Anthony, LSO, Decca, 1949
    - – War, he sung: Richard Lewis, LSO, HMV, 1958
  - Israel in Egypt: Elsie Morison, Monica Sinclair, Richard Lewis, Huddersfield Choral Society, Liverpool Philharmonic, Columbia, 1956
  - Jephtha
    - – Deeper, and deeper still … Waft her angels: Webster Booth, Liverpool Philharmonic, HMV, 1945
    - – Waft her, angels; For ever blessed: Richard Lewis, LSO, HMV, 1958
  - Joshua – So long the memory … While Kedron's brook: Richard Lewis, LSO, HMV, 1958
  - Judas Maccabaeus – Thanks to my brethren … How vain is man; My arms! … Sound an alarm!: Richard Lewis, LSO, HMV, 1958
  - Messiah
    - Isobel Baillie, Gladys Ripley, James Johnston, Norman Walker, Huddersfield Choral Society, Liverpool Philharmonic, Columbia, 1946
    - Elsie Morison, Marjorie Thomas, Richard Lewis, Norman Walker, Huddersfield Choral Society, Liverpool Philharmonic, Columbia, 1954
    - Elsie Morison, Marjorie Thomas, Richard Lewis, James Milligan, Huddersfield Choral Society, Royal Liverpool Philharmonic, HMV, 1959
    - Elizabeth Harwood, Norma Procter, Alexander Young, John Shirley-Quirk, Royal Choral Society, RPO, Reader's Digest, 1964
    - – And the Glory of the Lord; Glory to God; Behold the Lamb of God; Surely He Hath Borne Our Griefs; All We Like Sheep; Hallelujah!; Amen: Royal Choral Society, Royal Albert Hall Orchestra, HMV, 1926
    - – Overture and Pastoral Symphony: LSO, HMV, 1931
    - – And the glory of the Lord; Hallelujah!: Royal Choral Society, LPO, HMV, 1932
    - – Behold the Lamb of God; Glory to God: Royal Choral Society, LPO, HMV, 1933
    - – Rejoice Greatly, O Daughter of Zion!; If God be for us, who can be against us?: Isobel Baillie, Liverpool Philharmonic, Columbia, 1945
    - – I know that my Redeemer liveth: Ada Alsop, LSO, Decca, 1949
  - Overture in D minor (arr Elgar): RPO, HMV, 1959
  - Rodelinda – Art Thou Troubled?: Kathleen Ferrier, LSO, Decca, 1946
  - Royal Fireworks Music (arr Harty):
    - Liverpool Philharmonic, Columbia, 1948
    - BBCSO, HMV, 1954
    - RPO, HMV, 1959
  - Samson – Total eclipse: Richard Lewis, LSO, HMV, 1958
  - Samson Overture: RPO, HMV, 1959
  - Semele – Where'er you walk
    - Richard Lewis, LSO, Decca, 1949
    - Richard Lewis, LSO, HMV, 1958
  - Serse – "Ombra mai fu": Kathleen Ferrier, LSO, Decca, 1949
  - Solomon (arr Costa and Sargent) – From the censer curling rise: Huddersfield Choral Society, Royal Liverpool Philharmonic, HMV, 1959
  - Water Music (arr Harty)
    - Hallé, Columbia, 1942
    - BBCSO, HMV, 1954
    - RPO, HMV, 1959
  - Zadok the Priest (arr Sargent): Huddersfield Choral Society, Royal Liverpool Philharmonic, HMV, 1959
- Harty
  - A John Field Suite: Liverpool Philharmonic, Columbia, 1943
- Haydn
  - Cello Concerto in D: Emanuel Feuermann, Symphony Orchestra, Columbia, 1936
  - The Creation – The heavens are telling; Achieved is the glorious work: Royal Choral Society, LPO, HMV, 1933
  - Symphony No 94: Liverpool Philharmonic, Columbia, 1948
- Hérold
  - Zampa Overture: Liverpool Philharmonic, Columbia, 1948

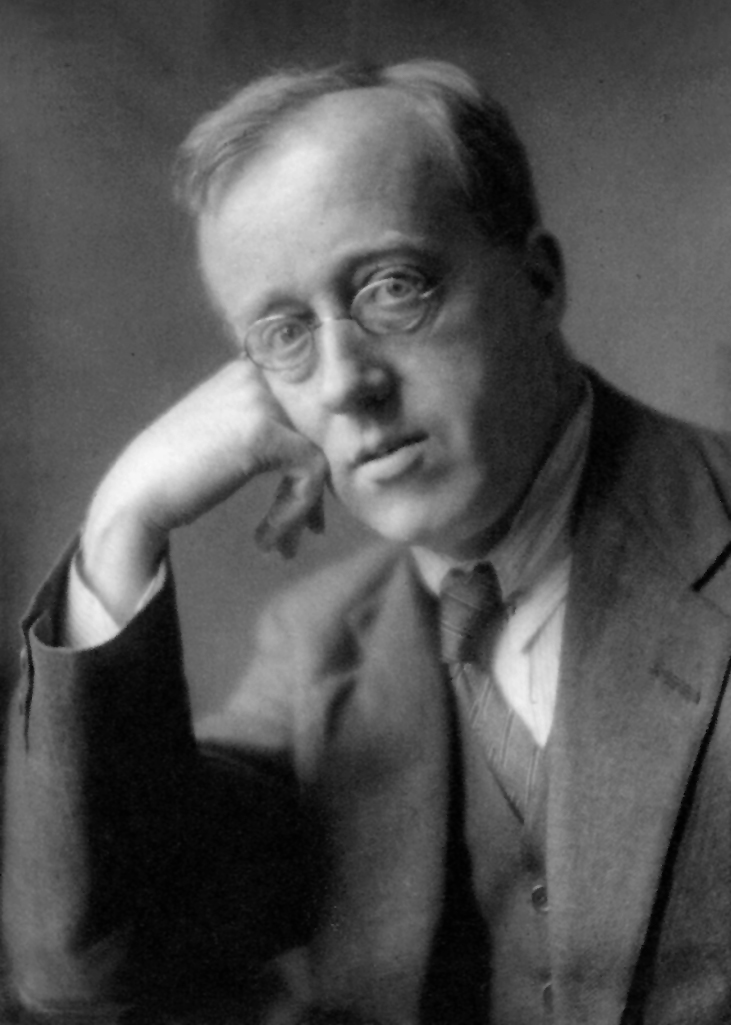
Gustav Holst

- Holst
  - Oriental Suite Beni Mora: BBCSO, HMV, 1958
  - St Paul's Suite: RPO, HMV (Jan 4–5, 1965, Studio 1, Abbey Road)
  - The Hymn of Jesus: Huddersfield Choral Society, Liverpool Philharmonic, HMV, 1945
  - The Perfect Fool – Ballet Music: RPO, HMV, 1962
  - The Planets
    - Chorus, LSO, Decca, 1954
    - BBC Women's Chorus, BBCSO, HMV, 1958
- Humperdinck
  - Hansel and Gretel Overture: BBCSO, HMV, 1954
- Ireland
  - A London Overture: Liverpool Philharmonic, Columbia, 1945
- Liszt
  - Hungarian Rhapsody No 3: Symphony Orchestra, HMV, 1932
  - Piano Concerto No 1: Earl Wild, RPO, Reader's Digest, 1962
- Litolff
  - Concerto Symphonique, No 4 – Scherzo: Shura Cherkassky, BBCSO, HMV, 1959
- Massenet
  - Hérodiade – Les Phéniciennes (ballet music No 4): New Symphony Orchestra, HMV, 1932

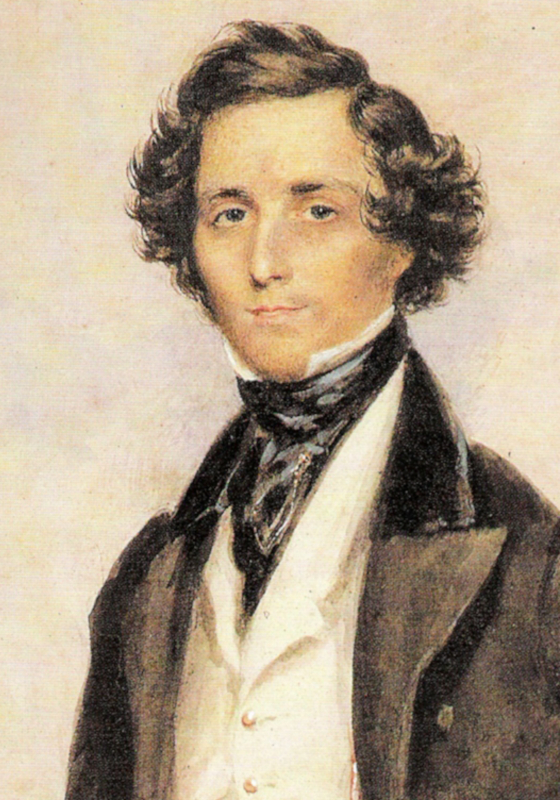
Felix Mendelssohn

- Mendelssohn
  - Elijah
    - Isobel Baillie, James Johnston, Gladys Ripley, Harold Williams, Huddersfield Choral Society, Liverpool Philharmonic, Columbia, 1947
    - Elsie Morison, Marjorie Thomas, Richard Lewis, John Cameron, Huddersfield Choral Society, Royal Liverpool Philharmonic, Columbia, 1957
    - – As God the Lord of Israel liveth; Help, Lord!; Ye people, rend your hearts; If with all your hearts; Call first upon your God; Baal, we cry to thee; Take all the prophets of Baal; Is not His word like a fire; Hear ye, Israel; Be not afraid; Tarry here, my servant; It is enough; See how he sleepeth; Lift thine eyes; Arise, Elijah!; O rest in the Lord; Arise now!; Behold! God the Lord passed by!; Then shall the righteous shine forth; And then, shall your light break forth: Elizabeth Harwood, Marjorie Thomas, Richard Lewis, John Shirley-Quirk, Royal Choral Society, RPO, HMV, 1965
    - – Choruses – Help, Lord; Yet doth the Lord see it not; Blessed are the men who fear him; Baal, we cry to thee; Thanks be to God; Be not afraid; Behold! God the Lord passeth by; And then shall your light break forth: Keith Falkner, Royal Choral Society, New Symphony Orchestra HMV, 1929
  - The Hebrides Overture: RPO, HMV, 1961
  - A Midsummer Night's Dream music (complete): Pauline Brockless, Patricia Howard, BBCSO and Chorus, HMV (as part of a recording of the play), 1955
  - Ruy Blas Overture: Orchestra, 1931, HMV
  - Symphony No 3: Liverpool Philharmonic, Columbia, 1948
  - Violin Concerto: Gioconda de Vito, LSO, HMV, 1953
- Miaskovsky
  - Cello Concerto: Mstislav Rostropovich, Philharmonia, HMV, 1957

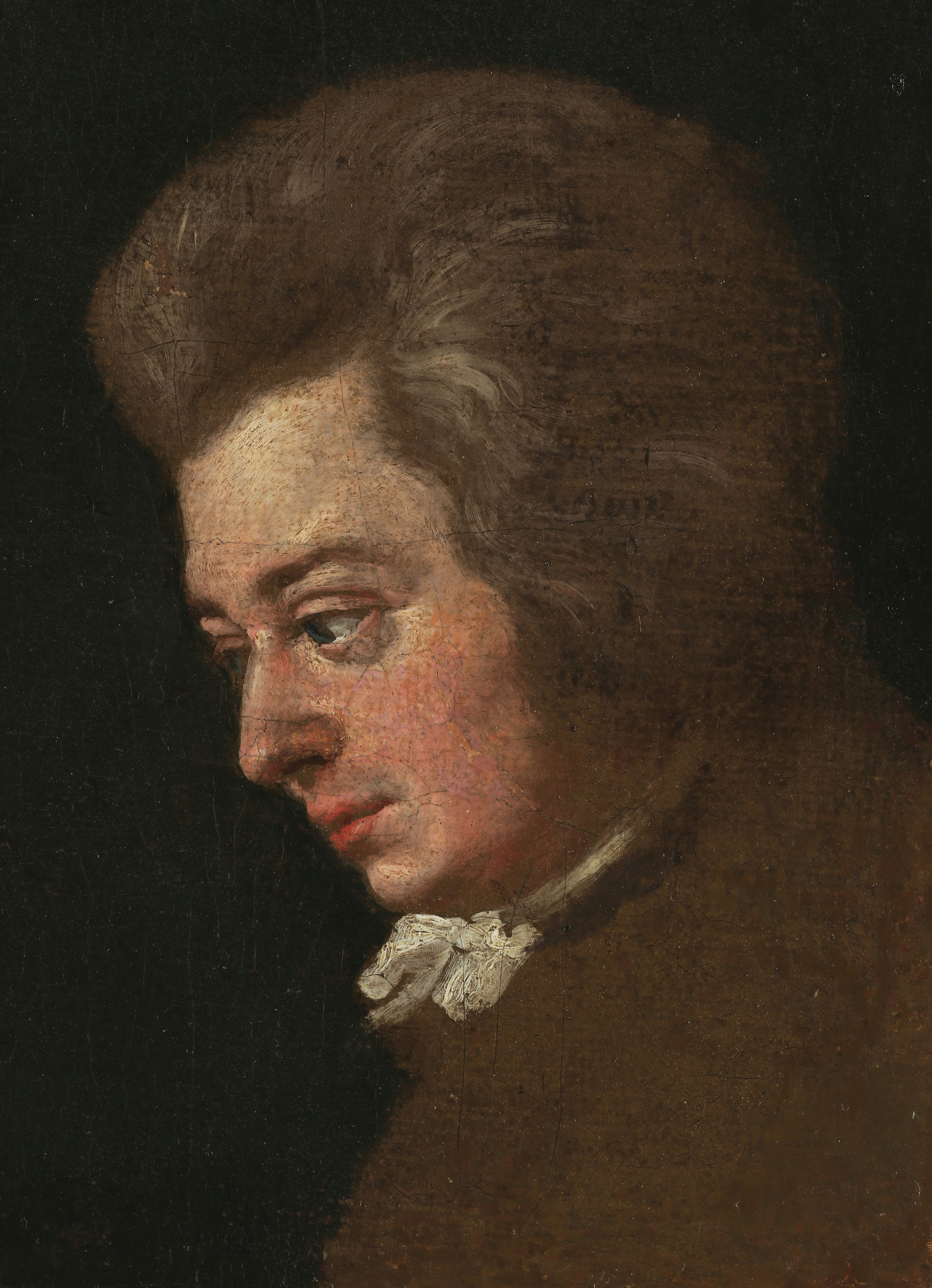
Wolfgang Amadeus Mozart

- Mozart
  - Clarinet Concerto: Reginald Kell, LPO, HMV; 1940
  - Don Giovanni – Il mio tesoro; Dalla sua pace: Webster Booth, Liverpool Philharmonic, HMV, 1943
  - Idomeneo – Zeffiretti lusinghieri (sung in German); Se il padre perdei: Ria Ginster, Orchestra, 1933
  - Piano Concerto No 19: Artur Schnabel, LSO, HMV, 1937
  - Piano Concerto No 21: Artur Schnabel, LSO, HMV (rec 1937) 1959
  - Piano Concerto No 27: Artur Schnabel, LSO, HMV (rec 1937) 1959
  - Symphony No 40: Orchestra of the Royal Opera House, Covent Garden, HMV, 1928
  - The Marriage of Figaro – Non so più: Ria Ginster, Orch, 1933
  - Violin Concerto in A, K219: Jascha Heifetz, LSO, HMV, 1954
  - Violin Concerto in D, K 218
    - Fritz Kreisler, Orchestra, HMV, 1932
    - Yehudi Menuhin, Liverpool Philharmonic, HMV, 1943
  - Violin Concerto in E flat Major, K268
    - Jacques Thibaud, Orchestra, HMV, 1938
    - Jascha Heifetz, LSO, 1954
- Mussorgsky
  - Night on the Bare Mountain: LSO, Vox (orig release date not known; reissued by Saga, 1972)
  - Pictures from an Exhibition: LSO, Vox (orig release date not known; reissued by Saga, 1972)
- Parry
  - Jerusalem: Royal Choral Society, Philharmonia, HMV, 1953
- Pepusch, arr. Austin
  - The Beggar's Opera: Elsie Morison, Zena Walker, John Cameron, John Neville, Monica Sinclair, Rachel Roberts, Ian Wallace, Eric Porter, Owen Brannigan, Paul Rogers, Constance Shacklock, Daphne Heard, Alexander Young, Robert Hardy, Pro Arte Chorus and Orchestra, HMV, 1955
- Prokofiev
  - Lieutenant Kijé Suite: LSO, WRC, 1962
  - Peter and the Wolf: Ralph Richardson, LSO, Decca (rec 1959), 1970
  - Sinfonia Concertante: Mstislav Rostropovich, RPO, HMV, 1959
  - Symphony No. 1: LSO, Decca (rec 1959), 1970
  - Symphony No. 5: LSO, World Record Club, 1962
- Puccini
  - Turandot – orchestral suite: Royal Opera Orchestra, 1927
- Purcell
  - Suite from the Dramatic Music of Purcell (arr and ed Albert Coates): LSO, Decca, 1953
- Quilter
  - Children's Overture: New Light Symphony Orchestra, HMV, 1929
- Rachmaninov
  - Piano Concerto No 1: Benno Moiseiwitsch, Philharmonia, HMV, 1949
  - Piano Concerto No 2
    - Cyril Smith, Liverpool Philharmonic, Columbia, 1947
    - Moura Lympany, RPO, HMV, 1962
  - Prelude in C sharp minor: LSO, HMV, 1931
  - Rhapsody on a Theme of Paganini
    - Cyril Smith, Liverpool Philharmonic, Columbia, 1950
    - Cyril Smith, Philharmonia, Columbia, 1954
  - Symphony No 3: BBCSO, HMV, 1954
- Rawsthorne
  - Piano Concerto No 2
    - Clifford Curzon, LSO, Decca, 1952
    - Denis Matthews, BBCSO, HMV, 1958
- Respighi
  - Ancient Dances and Airs, Second Suite: Orchestra of the Royal Opera House, Covent Garden, HMV, 1932
  - Fountains and Pines of Rome: LSO, Everest, 1960
- Romberg
  - Toy Symphony: New Symphony Orchestra, HMV, 1929

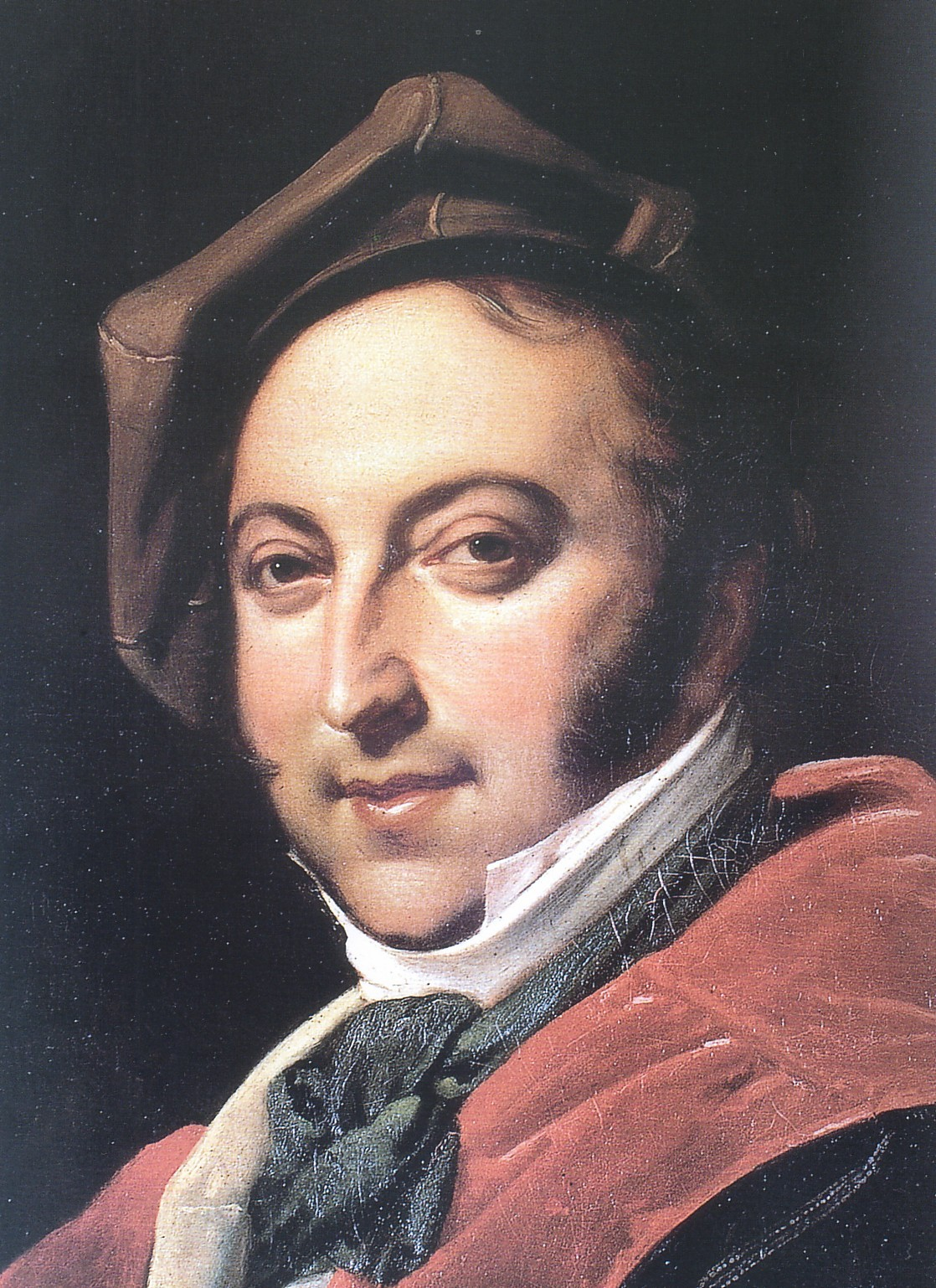
Gioachino Rossini

- Rossini
  - The Barber of Seville, Overture: VPO, HMV, 1961
  - La Boutique fantasque (arr Respighi): RPO, HMV, 1962
  - The Journey to Rheims, Overture: VPO, HMV, 1961
  - Semiramide, Overture: VPO, HMV, 1961
  - The Silken Ladder Overture: RPO, HMV, 1961
  - William Tell – Pas de trois et Choeur tyrolienne: Orchestra of the Royal Opera House, Covent Garden, HMV, 1963
  - William Tell Overture
    - Orchestra of the Royal Opera House, Covent Garden, HMV, 1927
    - VPO, HMV, 1961
- Rubbra
  - Piano Concerto: Denis Matthews, BBCSO, HMV, 1958
- Saint-Saëns
  - Cello Concerto No 1: Mstislav Rostropovich, Philharmonia, HMV, 1957
  - Omphale's Spinning Wheel: Liverpool Philharmonic, Columbia, 1945
  - Violin Concerto No 3: Jascha Heifetz, New Symphony Orchestra, RCA, 1962
- Schubert
  - Marche Militaire in D major: Liverpool Philharmonic Columbia, 1948
  - Overture in the Italian Style in C major: Liverpool Philharmonic, Columbia, 1945
  - Rosamunde – Entr'acte in B flat major: Liverpool Philharmonic, Columbia, 1948
  - Rosamunde – Overture; Entr'acte No 3 in B flat major; Ballet No 2 in G major: RPO, HMV, 1961
  - Symphony No 8: RPO, HMV, 1961
  - Symphony No 9: LSO, Decca, 1950
- Schumann
  - Cello Concerto: Pierre Fournier, Philharmonia, Columbia, 1957
- Shostakovich
  - Symphony No 9: LSO, WRC, 1962

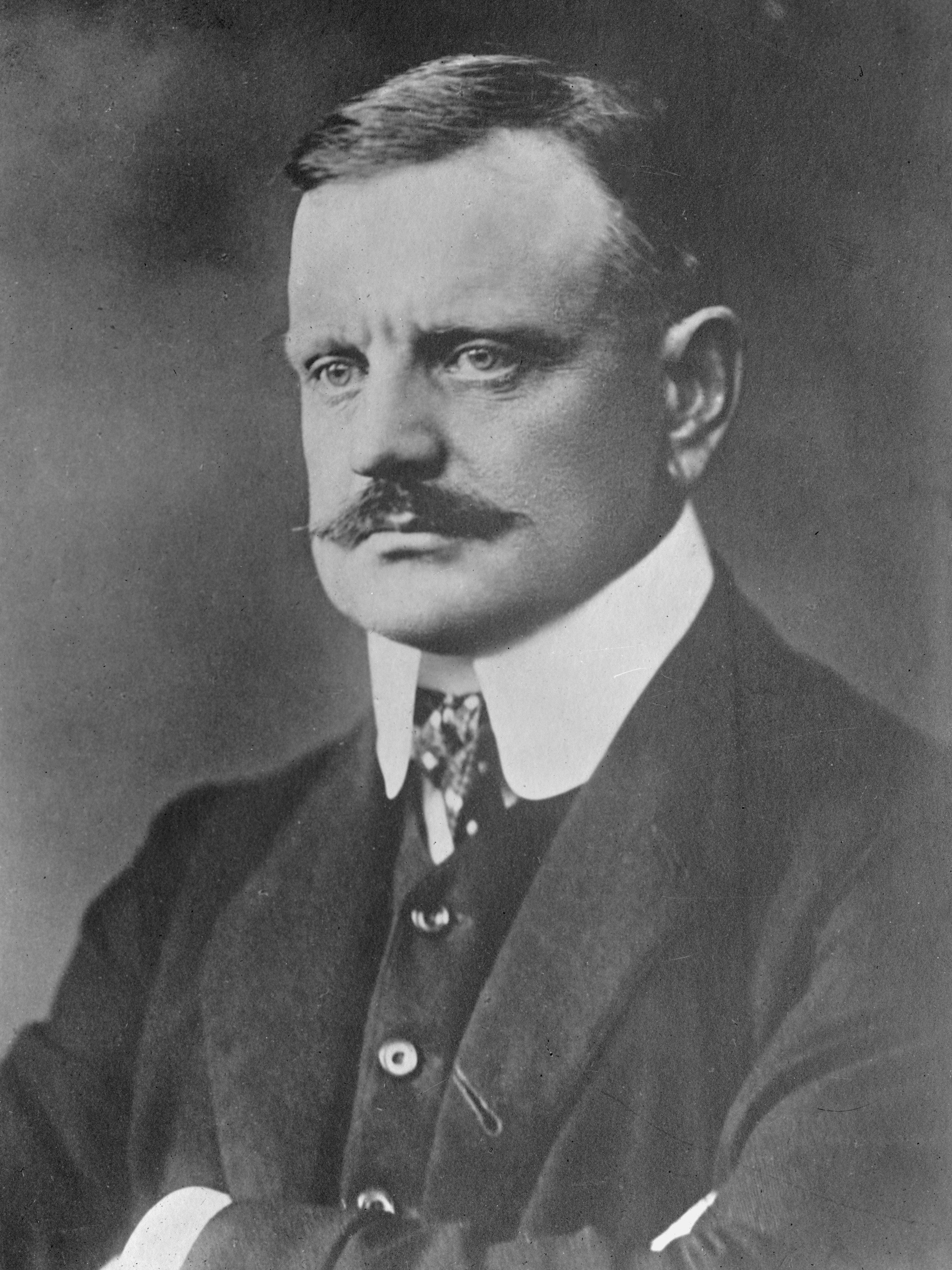
Jean Sibelius

- Sibelius
  - En saga: Vienna Philharmonic Orchestra, HMV, 1963
  - Finlandia
    - Symphony Orchestra, HMV, 1930
    - Vienna Philharmonic Orchestra, HMV, 1963
  - Karelia Suite: Vienna Philharmonic Orchestra, HMV, 1963
  - Pohjola's Daughter: BBCSO, HMV, 1959
  - The Swan of Tuonela: Vienna Philharmonic Orchestra, HMV, 1963
  - Symphony No 1: BBCSO, HMV, 1958
  - Symphony No 2: BBCSO, HMV, 1958
  - Symphony No 4: BBCSO, BBC, (live recording, 1965), 2008
  - Symphony No 5: BBCSO, HMV, 1959
- Smetana
  - Má vlast: RPO, HMV, 1965
  - The Bartered Bride Overture: RPO, HMV, 1961
- Stanford
  - Songs of the Sea: Peter Dawson, Men's Chorus and Orchestra, HMV, 1928
- Eduard Strauss
  - Bahn Frei: Liverpool Philharmonic, Columbia, 1945
- Johann Strauss I
  - Radetzky March: Liverpool Philharmonic, Columbia, 1945
- Johann Strauss II
  - Annen Polka: Liverpool Philharmonic, Columbia, 1945
  - An Artist's Life: RPO, HMV, 1962
  - The Blue Danube: RPO, HMV, 1962
  - Emperor Waltz: RPO, HMV, 1962
  - Tales from the Vienna Woods: RPO, HMV, 1962
  - Wine, women and song: RPO, HMV, 1962

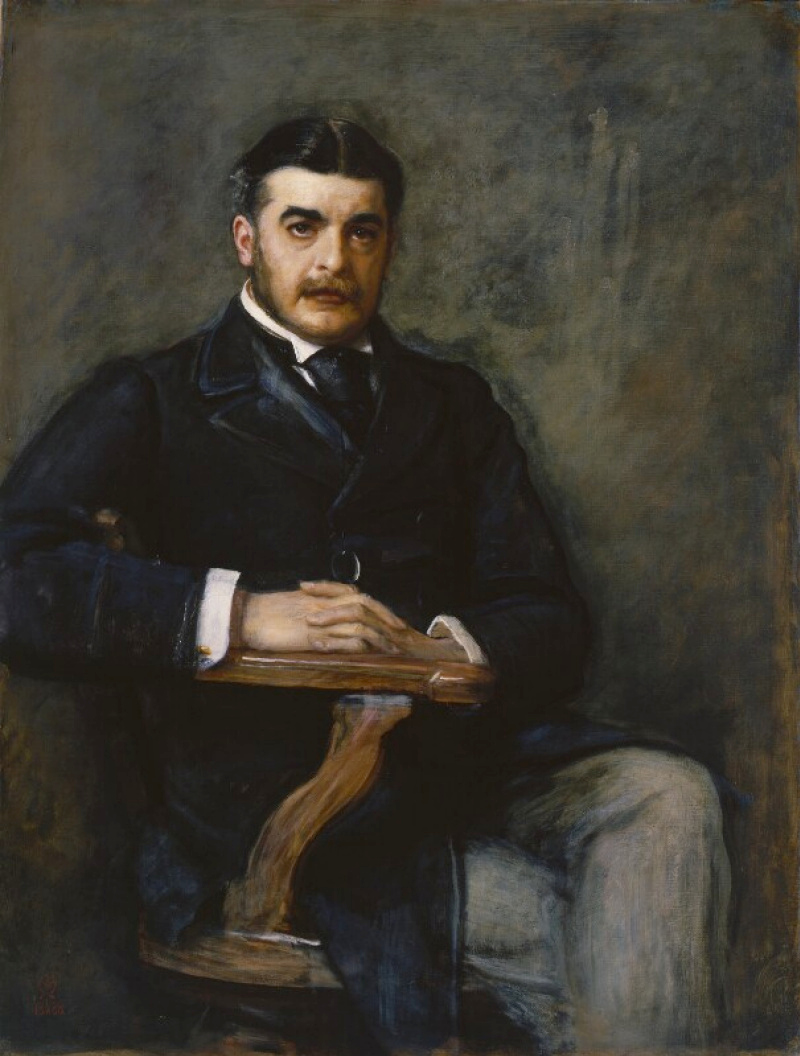
Arthur Sullivan

- Sullivan
  - Overture di Ballo: BBCSO, HMV, 1959
  - The Gondoliers
    - (abridged): George Baker, Webster Booth, Sydney Granville, Derek Oldham, Leslie Rands, Leonard Hubbard, Stuart Robertson, Essie Ackland, Nellie Walker, Alice Moxon, Muriel Dickson, Beatrice Elburn, Phyllis Evens, chorus and orchestra, HMV, 1931
    - Geraint Evans, Alexander Young, Owen Brannigan, Richard Lewis, John Cameron, James Milligan, Monica Sinclair, Edna Graham, Elsie Morison, Marjorie Thomas, Stella Hitchens, Lavinia Renton, Helen Watts, Pro Arte Orchestra, Glyndebourne Festival Chorus, HMV, 1957
  - HMS Pinafore
    - Henry Lytton, George Baker, Charles Goulding, Darrell Fancourt, Sydney Granville, Stuart Robertson, Elsie Griffin, Bertha Lewis, Nellie Briercliffe, chorus and orchestra, HMV, 1930
    - George Baker, John Cameron, Richard Lewis, Owen Brannigan, James Milligan, Elsie Morison, Monica Sinclair, Marjorie Thomas, Glyndebourne Festival Chorus, Pro Arte Orchestra
  - Iolanthe
    - George Baker, Darrell Fancourt, Derek Oldham, Sydney Granville, Leslie Rands, Bertha Lewis, Nellie Briercliffe, Alice Moxon, Nellie Walker, Winifred Lawson, Chorus and Light Opera Orchestra, chorus and orchestra, HMV, 1930
    - George Baker, Ian Wallace, Alexander Young, Owen Brannigan, John Cameron, Monica Sinclair, Marjorie Thomas, April Cantelo, Heather Harper, Elsie Morison, Pro Arte Orchestra, Glyndebourne Festival Chorus, HMV, 1959
  - The Mikado: Owen Brannigan, Richard Lewis, Geraint Evans, Ian Wallace, John Cameron, Elsie Morison, Marjorie Thomas, Jeannette Sinclair, Monica Sinclair, Pro Arte Orchestra, Glyndebourne Festival Chorus, HMV, 1957
  - Patience
    - Darrell Fancourt, Martyn Green, Derek Oldham, George Baker, Leslie Rands, Nellie Briercliffe, Marjorie Eyre, Rita Mackay, Bertha Lewis, Winifred Lawson, chorus and orchestra, HMV, 1931
    - John Shaw, Trevor Anthony, Alexander Young, George Baker, John Cameron, Marjorie Thomas, Elizabeth Harwood, Heather Harper, Monica Sinclair, Elsie Morison, Glyndebourne Festival Chorus, Pro Arte Orchestra, HMV, 1962
    - – Overture: Liverpool Philharmonic, Columbia, 1947
  - The Pirates of Penzance
    - George Baker, Peter Dawson, Stuart Robertson, Derek Oldham, Leo Sheffield, Elsie Griffin, Nellie Briercliffe, Nellie Walker, Dorothy Gill, chorus and orchestra, HMV, 1929
    - (abridged): George Baker, Darrell Fancourt, Stuart Robertson, Derek Oldham, Sydney Granville, Muriel Dickson, Bertha Lewis, chorus and orchestra, HMV, 1931
    - George Baker, James Milligan, John Cameron, Richard Lewis, Owen Brannigan, Elsie Morison, Heather Harper, Marjorie Thomas, Monica Sinclair, Glyndebourne Festival Chorus, Pro Arte Orchestra, HMV
  - Princess Ida
    - Richard Watson, Derek Oldham, Charles Goulding, George Baker, Henry Lytton, Darrell Fancourt, Stuart Robertson, Edward Halland, Muriel Dickson, Dorothy Gill, Alice Moxon, Nellie Briercliffe, Phyllis Evens, chorus and orchestra, HMV, 1932
    - Kenneth Sandford, Philip Potter, David Palmer, Jeffrey Skitch, John Reed, Donald Adams, Anthony Raffell, George Cook, Elizabeth Harwood, Christene Palmer, Ann Hood, Valerie Masterson, D'Oyly Carte Opera Chorus, RPO, Decca, 1965
    - – Orchestral Selection: New Light Symphony Orchestra, HMV, 1931
  - Ruddigore
    - George Baker, Derek Oldham, Sydney Granville, Stuart Robertson, Muriel Dickson, Nellie Briercliffe, Dorothy Gill, Alice Moxon, Darrell Fancourt, chorus and orchestra, HMV, 1931
    - George Baker, Richard Lewis, Owen Brannigan, Harold Blackburn, Elsie Morison, Pamela Bowden, Monica Sinclair, Elizabeth Harwood, Joseph Rouleau, Pro Arte Orchestra, Glyndebourne Festival Chorus, HMV, 1963
  - Trial by Jury: George Baker, Elsie Morison, Richard Lewis, John Cameron, Owen Brannigan, Bernard Turgeon, Pro Arte Orchestra, Glyndebourne Festival Chorus, HMV, 1961
  - The Yeomen of the Guard
    - Arthur Hosking, Derek Oldham, Peter Dawson, Walter Glynne, George Baker, Leo Sheffield, L Gowings, Henry Millidge, Winifred Lawson, Nellie Briercliffe, Dorothy Gill, Elsie Griffin, chorus and orchestra, HMV, 1929
    - (abridged) George Baker, Sydney Granville, Derek Oldham, Muriel Dickson, Beatrice Elburn, Nellie Walker, chorus and orchestra, HMV, 1931
    - Denis Dowling, Richard Lewis, John Cameron, Alexander Young, Geraint Evans, Owen Brannigan, John Carol Case, Elsie Morison, Marjorie Thomas, Monica Sinclair, Doreen Hume, Pro Arte Orchestra, Glyndebourne Festival Chorus, HMV, 1958
    - Anthony Raffell, Philip Potter, Donald Adams, David Palmer, John Reed, Kenneth Sandford, David Palmer, Thomas Lawlor, Elizabeth Harwood, Ann Hood, Gillian Knight, Margaret Eales, D'Oyly Carte Opera Chorus, RPO, Decca, 1964
    - – Overture: Liverpool Philharmonic, Columbia, 1947
- Suppé
  - Poet and Peasant Overture: National Symphony Orchestra, Decca, 1948

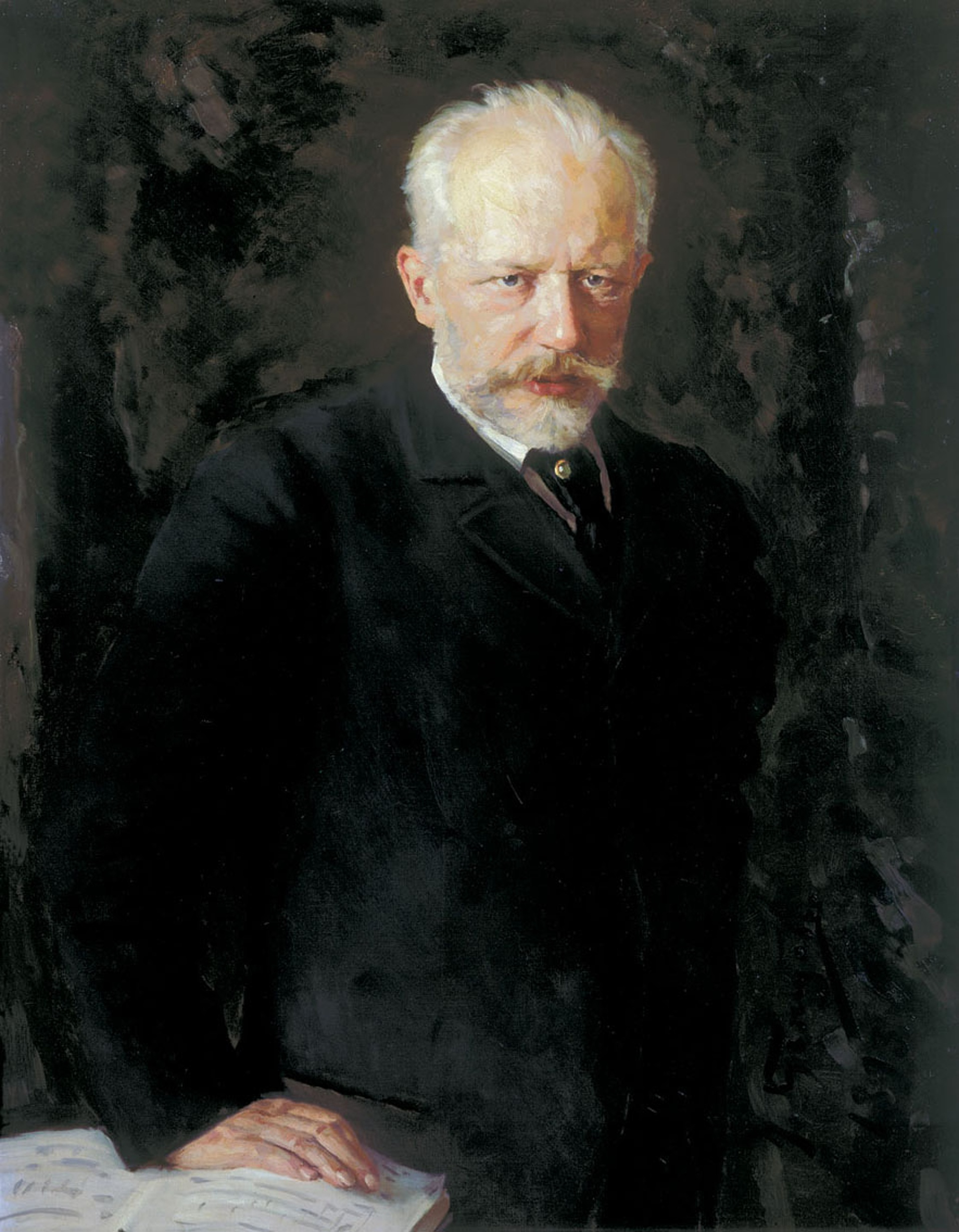
Pyotr Ilyich Tchaikovsky

- Tchaikovsky
  - 1812 Overture: RPO, HMV, 1960
  - Eugene Onegin
    - – Tatiana's Letter Scene: Joan Hammond, BBCSO, HMV, 1959
    - – Polonaise and Waltz: Hallé, Columbia, 1942
  - Marche Slave
    - Philharmonia, Columbia, 1949
    - BBCSO, HMV, 1953
    - RPO, HMV, 1960
  - Mazeppa – Cossack Dance: Liverpool Philharmonic, HMV, 1943
  - Romeo and Juliet Overture: RPO, HMV, 1960
  - Suite No 3 – Theme and Variations
    - Liverpool Philharmonic, HMV, 1943
    - Philharmonia, HMV, 1956
  - String Quartet No 1: Andante Cantabile (arr Schmid): BBCSO, HMV, 1959
  - Symphony No 5: BBCSO, HMV, 1955
  - The Sleeping Beauty – Waltz, Act 1: RPO, HMV, 1960
  - Variations on a Rococo Theme: Pierre Fournier, Philharmonia, Columbia, 1957
  - Violin Concerto
    - Ruggiero Ricci, New Symphony Orchestra, Decca, 1950
    - Ruggiero Ricci, LSO, Decca, 1961
- Thomas
  - Esmeralda – Vision Entrancing: Webster Booth, Liverpool Philharmonic, HMV, 1945
- Vaughan Williams
  - Fantasia on a Theme by Thomas Tallis
    - BBCSO, HMV, 1953
    - Philharmonia, HMV, 1960
  - Fantasia on Greensleeves
    - Hallé, Columbia, 1942
    - LSO, HMV, 1957
  - Hugh the Drover: Mary Lewis, Constance Willis, Nellie Walker, Tudor Davies, Frederick Collier, Peter Dawson, William Anderson, chorus and orchestra, HMV, 1924
  - The Lark Ascending: Isolde Menges, Orchestra, HMV, 1930
  - Romance for Harmonica, String Orchestra and Piano: Larry Adler, String Orchestra, Columbia, 1952
  - Serenade to Music: Elsie Morison, Marjorie Thomas, Duncan Robertson, Trevor Anthony, chorus, LSO, HMV, 1957
  - Symphony No 4: BBCSO, BBC, (live recording, 1963) 2008
  - The Wasps Overture
    - Hallé, Columbia, 1942
    - LSO, HMV, 1957
  - Toward the Unknown Region: chorus, LSO, HMV, 1957
- Verdi
  - Aida – Celeste Aida (in English): Webster Booth, Liverpool Philharmonic, HMV, 1945
- Vieuxtemps
  - Violin Concerto No 5: Jascha Heifetz, LSO, HMV, 1948
- Wagner
  - Das Rheingold Prelude: Philharmonia, Columbia, 1949
  - Die Walküre – Ride of the Valkyries: Philharmonia, Columbia, 1949
  - The Mastersingers – Chorale Act I and Finale Act III (live recordings): Royal Choral Society, Orchestra, HMV, 1929
  - The Mastersingers Overture: RPO, HMV, 1961
- Walton
  - Belshazzar's Feast: James Milligan, Huddersfield Choral Society, Royal Liverpool Philharmonic, HMV, 1958
  - Viola Concerto: William Primrose, RPO, Philips, 1955
  - Coronation March, Orb and Sceptre: LSO, Decca, 1953
  - Façade – Scotch Rhapsody; Swiss Jodelling Song; Polka; Old Sir Faulk; Valse; Popular Song; Tango-Pasodoble; Tarantella: RPO, 1962
  - Symphony No 1: New Philharmonia, HMV, 1967
- Warlock
  - Capriol Suite: RPO, HMV, 1966
- Weber
  - Bassoon Concerto: Gwydion Brooke, Liverpool Philharmonic, Columbia, 1950
