= The Dream of Gerontius discography =

The Dream of Gerontius, Edward Elgar's 1900 work for singers and orchestra, (Note: It is often called an oratorio, but Elgar did not use the term for this work and disapproved when others did so.) had to wait forty-five years for its first complete recording. Sir Henry Wood made acoustic recordings of four extracts from The Dream of Gerontius as early as 1916, with Clara Butt as the angel, and Henry Coward's Sheffield Choir recorded a portion of the Part I "Kyrie" in the same period. Edison Bell recorded the work under Joseph Batten in abridged form in 1924 (the recording, with orchestral and choral forces considerably affected by the limitations of recording methods of the day, was swiftly rendered obsolete with the introduction of electronic recording the following year). His Master's Voice issued excerpts from two live performances conducted by Elgar in 1927, with the soloists Margaret Balfour, Steuart Wilson, Tudor Davies, Herbert Heyner and Horace Stevens; further portions of the first of those two performances, deemed unfit for publication at the time, have since been published by EMI and other companies.

There also exist fragments privately recorded by amateurs "off-air" (i.e. from live radio broadcasts), some of which have received commercial issue in recent years although none are known to exist in complete form. (Note: This is mainly because of the time limitations of direct-to-disc recording and the concomitant problem of changing over from the full disc to a new empty disc, which could only be overcome if the amateur possessed two cutters.) They give alternative accounts of artists such as Heddle Nash, Malcolm Sargent, Adrian Boult (who all later recorded the work commercially) and Horace Stevens (who recorded the Angel of the Agony's solo under Elgar), and accounts of artists such as Astra Desmond, Muriel Brunskill, Parry Jones, and Keith Falkner, all noted for their performances of the work, and never commercially recorded singing it.

The first complete recording was made in 1945 conducted by Sargent. Since then it has received further commercial recordings as shown below.

Conductor	Tenor	Mezzo	Baritone	Chorus	Orchestra	Label	Year
Sir Malcolm Sargent	Heddle Nash	Gladys Ripley	Dennis Noble, Norman Walker	Huddersfield Choral Society	Liverpool Philharmonic Orchestra	EMI	1945
Sir Malcolm Sargent	Richard Lewis	Marjorie Thomas	John Cameron	Huddersfield Choral Society	Liverpool Philharmonic Orchestra	EMI	1955
Sir John Barbirolli	Richard Lewis	Maureen Forrester	Warren Martin	The Westminster Choir	New York Philharmonic-Symphony Orchestra	SOMM	1959
Hans Swarowsky	Julius Patzak	Ira Malaniuk	Ludwig Welter	Chor des Österreichischen Rundfunks	Orchester des Österreichischen Rundfunks	Elgar Editions	1960
Sir John Barbirolli	Richard Lewis	Dame Janet Baker	Kim Borg	Hallé Choir, Sheffield Philharmonic Choir, Ambrosian Opera Chorus	Hallé Orchestra	EMI	1965
Sir Adrian Boult	Peter Pears	Dame Janet Baker	John Shirley-Quirk	London Philharmonic Choir	London Philharmonic Orchestra	ICA Classiscs	1968
Benjamin Britten	Peter Pears	Yvonne Minton	John Shirley-Quirk	London Symphony Chorus, Choir of King's College, Cambridge	London Symphony Orchestra	Decca	1971
Sir Adrian Boult	Nicolai Gedda	Helen Watts	Robert Lloyd	London Philharmonic Choir, John Alldis Choir	New Philharmonia Orchestra	EMI	1976
Alexander Gibson	Robert Tear	Alfreda Hodgson	Benjamin Luxon	Scottish National Chorus	Scottish National Orchestra	CRD	1976
Yevgeny Svetlanov	Arthur Davies	Felicity Palmer	Norman Bailey	London Symphony Chorus	USSR State Symphony Orchestra	Melodiya	1983
Simon Rattle	John Mitchinson	Dame Janet Baker	John Shirley-Quirk	City of Birmingham Symphony Chorus	City of Birmingham Symphony Orchestra	EMI	1987
Richard Hickox	Arthur Davies	Felicity Palmer	Gwynne Howell	London Symphony Chorus	London Symphony Orchestra	Chandos	1988
Vernon Handley	Anthony Rolfe Johnson	Catherine Wyn-Rogers	Michael George	Huddersfield Choral Society, Liverpool Philharmonic Choir	Royal Liverpool Philharmonic Orchestra	EMI	1993
David Hill	William Kendall	Sarah Fryer	Matthew Best	Waynflete Singers, Bournemouth Symphony Chorus	Bournemouth Symphony Orchestra	Naxos	1997
Sir Andrew Davis	Philip Langridge	Catherine Wyn-Rogers	Alastair Miles	BBC Symphony Chorus	BBC Symphony Orchestra	NVC	1999
Sir Colin Davis	David Rendall	Anne Sofie von Otter	Alastair Miles	London Symphony Chorus	London Symphony Orchestra	LSO Live	2005
Sakari Oramo	Justin Lavender	Jane Irwin	Peter Rose	City of Birmingham Symphony Chorus	City of Birmingham Symphony Orchestra	CBSO	2006
Sir Mark Elder	Paul Groves	Alice Coote	Bryn Terfel	Hallé Choir, Hallé Youth Choir	Hallé Orchestra	Hallé	2008
Sir Colin Davis	Paul Groves	Sarah Connolly	John Relyea	Staatsopernchor Dresden	Staatskapelle Dresden	Edition Staatskapelle Dresden	2010
Vladimir Ashkenazy	Mark Tucker	Lilli Paasikivi	David Wilson-Johnson	Sydney Philharmonic Choirs, TSO Chorus	Sydney Symphony	ABC Classics	2011
Edo de Waart	Peter Auty	Michelle Breedt	John Hancock	Collegium Vocale Gent	Royal Flemish Philharmonic Orchestra	Pentatone	2013
Sir Andrew Davis	Stuart Skelton	Sarah Connolly	David Soar	BBC Symphony Chorus	BBC Symphony Orchestra	Chandos	2014
Daniel Barenboim	Andrew Staples	Catherine Wyn-Rogers	Thomas Hampson	Staatsopernchor Berlin, RIAS Kammerchor	Staatskapelle Berlin	Decca	2016
Edward Gardner	Allan Clayton	Jamie Barton	James Platt	London Philharmonic Choir, Hallé Choir	London Philharmonic Orchestra	BBC	2022
Paul McCreesh	Nicky Spence	Anna Stéphany	Andrew Foster-Williams	Gabrieli Consort, Polish National Youth Choir, Gabrieli Roar	Gabrieli Players	Signum Records	2023
Nicholas Collon	John Findon	Christine Rice	Roderick Williams	Helsinki Music Centre Choir, Cambridge University Symphony Chorus, Helsinki Chamber Choir, Alumni of the Choir of Clare College, Cambridge	Finnish Radio Symphony Orchestra	Ondine	2024
Martyn Brabbins	David Butt Philip	Karen Cargill	Roland Wood	Huddersfield Choral Society, Royal Northern College of Music Chamber Chorus	Orchestra of Opera North	Hyperion	2025

Additionally, there exist two further accounts by Barbirolli, both live: a 1957 performance in Italy with Jon Vickers, Constance Shacklock, Marian Nowakowski, and the Coro and Orchestra Sinfonica della RAI di Roma; and a January 1959 performance in New York with Richard Lewis, Maureen Forrester, Morley Meredith, the Westminster Choir, and the New York Philharmonic Symphony Orchestra. Both were recorded off-air from broadcasts, and the RAI performance was circulated widely, though unofficially; both performances have in recent years seen legitimate commercial issue of off-air transcriptions.

The work was recorded for television in 1968 at Canterbury Cathedral. This performance featured Peter Pears, Janet Baker and John Shirley-Quirk, conducted by Sir Adrian Boult. The performance was broadcast in that same year, and received a repeat showing several years later. Long unavailable, it was released on DVD by ICA Classics in 2016 (noted above).

The work received a further television broadcast by the BBC in 1997, in celebration of St Paul's Cathedral's tercentenary, and the BBC's 75th anniversary. The performance (commercially released by NVC in 1999, noted above), under Sir Andrew Davis, featured Philip Langridge, Catherine Wyn Rogers, Alastair Miles, and the BBC Chorus and Symphony Orchestra. It was released on DVD in 2006 by Warner Music.

== Critical opinion ==
The BBC Radio 3 feature "Building a Library" has presented comparative reviews of all available versions of The Dream of Gerontius on three occasions, and recommended as follows:

- 5 March 1988, reviewer, William Mann:
  - Sir Alexander Gibson
- 29 November 1997, reviewer, Michael Kennedy:
  - Malcolm Sargent (1945)
  - Sir John Barbirolli (1965)
- 7 October 2006, reviewer, Andrew Green:
  - Sir John Barbirolli (1965)
  - Malcolm Sargent (1945)
- 9 December 2017, reviewer, Mark Lowther:
  - Vernon Handley (Top Recommendation)
  - Malcolm Sargent (1945)
  - Sir John Barbirolli (1965)
  - Sir Mark Elder (2008)

The Penguin Guide to Recorded Classical Music, 2008, gave its maximum four star rating to the DVD recording of The Dream of Gerontius conducted by Sir Andrew Davis. No audio recording received more than three stars (representing "an outstanding performance and recording"). The recordings with three stars were those conducted by Barbirolli (1965), Boult, Hickox, and Sargent (1945 and 1955).

A comparative review in Gramophone in 2003 by Andrew Farach Colton recommended the recordings by Sargent (1945), Barbirolli (1965), and Britten. In a comparative review for the Elgar Society, Walter Essex preferred the EMI Barbirolli set.

== Notes and references ==
Notes

== Bibliography ==
- March, Ivan (ed). The Penguin Guide to Recorded Classical Music 2008, Penguin Books, London, 2007. ISBN 978-0-14-103336-5
