= Belshazzar's Feast (Walton) =

Cantata by the English composer William Walton

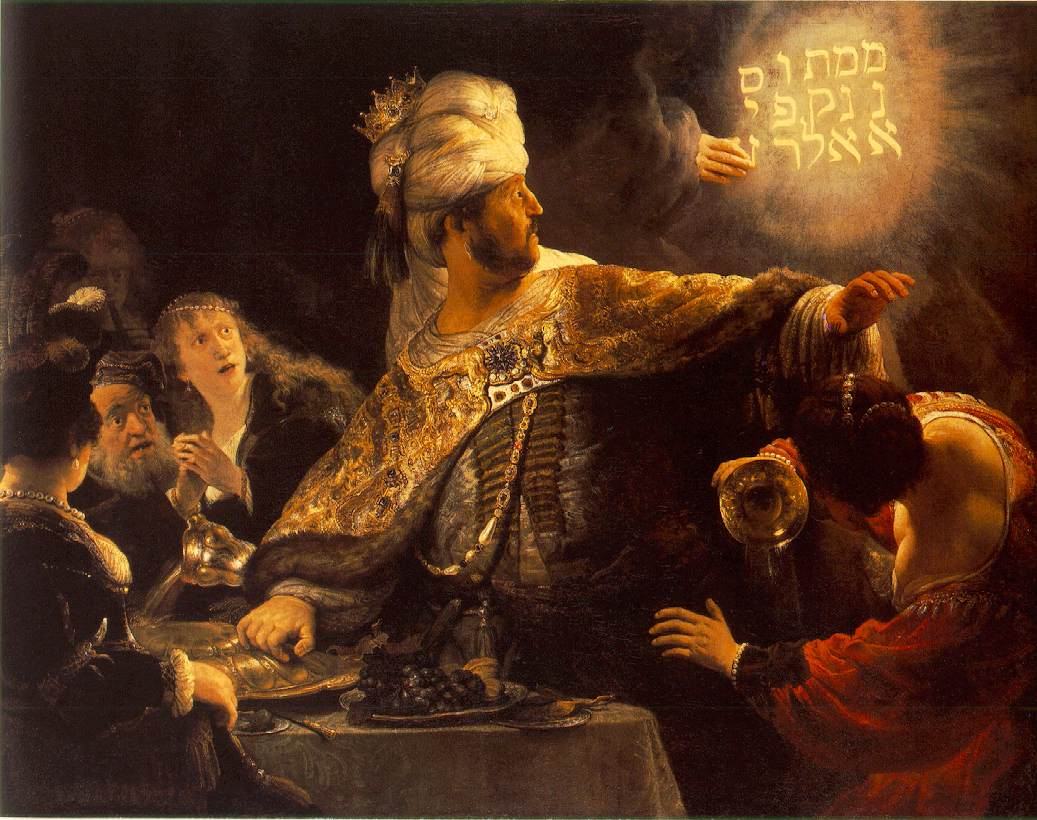
Rembrandt's depiction of "Belshazzar's Feast", used on the cover of the vocal score and of many recordings of the cantata

Belshazzar's Feast is a cantata by the English composer William Walton, depicting the Babylonian captivity of the people of Israel, the death of their oppressor Belshazzar and the collapse of the Babylonian kingdom. It was first performed at the Leeds Triennial Festival on 8 October 1931, with the baritone soloist Dennis Noble, the London Symphony Orchestra and the Leeds Festival Chorus, conducted by Malcolm Sargent.

Osbert Sitwell selected the text from the Bible, primarily the Book of Daniel and Psalm 137. The work is dedicated to Walton's friend and benefactor Lord Berners. Belshazzar's Feast has remained one of Walton's most celebrated compositions, but for many years after its premiere it was deemed unsuitable for church performance and in England it was banned from the Three Choirs Festival until 1957.

== Background ==
From left: Osbert, Edith and Sacheverell Sitwell, and William Walton, with Neil Porter of the Old Vic 1926

The work was conceived in response to a commission by the BBC. The invitation came in a letter of 21 August 1929 from the BBC programme planner Edward Clark, who asked Walton for a work suitable for broadcasting, written for a small choir, soloist, and an orchestra not exceeding fifteen players. Walton and Clark knew each other, as they had had dealings in relation to the premiere of the composer's Viola Concerto, which was given in the same year with Paul Hindemith as soloist. Walton's friend and sometime patron Osbert Sitwell suggested the writing on the wall at Belshazzar's feast as a subject and produced a libretto from biblical – mainly Old Testament – sources.

Walton – generally a slow and painstaking worker – struggled with the composition for well over a year, and it grew from its original conception as a short work for small forces, as commissioned by the BBC, to its eventual form. As the length and scale of the work grew during its composition, it became clear by mid-1930 that it was too big to meet the BBC's modest requirements.

Early in 1931 it was announced that Belshazzar's Feast would be premiered at the Leeds Triennial Festival. The director of the festival was the conductor Sir Thomas Beecham, who said to Walton, "Well, my boy, as you will probably never hear this work again, you might as well chuck in a couple of brass bands". Recalling this in 1972 Walton said, "I've always liked brass bands, so I did". "Brass bands" in this context meant two extra brass sections, each comprising three trumpets, three trombones and a tuba; the extra brass would be on hand in any case, for a performance of Berlioz's Requiem under Beecham, two days after the premiere of Walton's work. The extra brass sections are placed on either side of the platform and join in antiphonally at strategic points of the score, in the same way as they are used in the Berlioz work.

By March 1931 the work was complete and the members of the Leeds Festival Chorus were sent their parts. A myth grew up – which Walton believed for many years – that the chorus, rebelling against the difficulties of the choral writing, refused to go on rehearsing the piece and that consequently Beecham had to send his colleague Malcolm Sargent to pacify them. In a biography of Sargent published in 1968, Charles Reid reported that he had interviewed surviving members of the 1931 chorus, who said that the story was untrue, and that although some of the older singers "muttered resentfully about the score's irregular metres and other hazards", the chorus had enjoyed mastering the work. In September Walton attended one of the rehearsals and thanked the chorus for the trouble they had taken and the progress they had made. Sargent added that Berlioz's Requiem (which the chorus were to sing at the festival) and Elgar's Dream of Gerontius (which they had sung in previous years) were both considered impossible at one time. The Yorkshire Post reported, "The singers, now that the toil of learning the notes is over, are beginning to feel pleased with themselves, and actually to like the music".

== Premiere and later performances ==
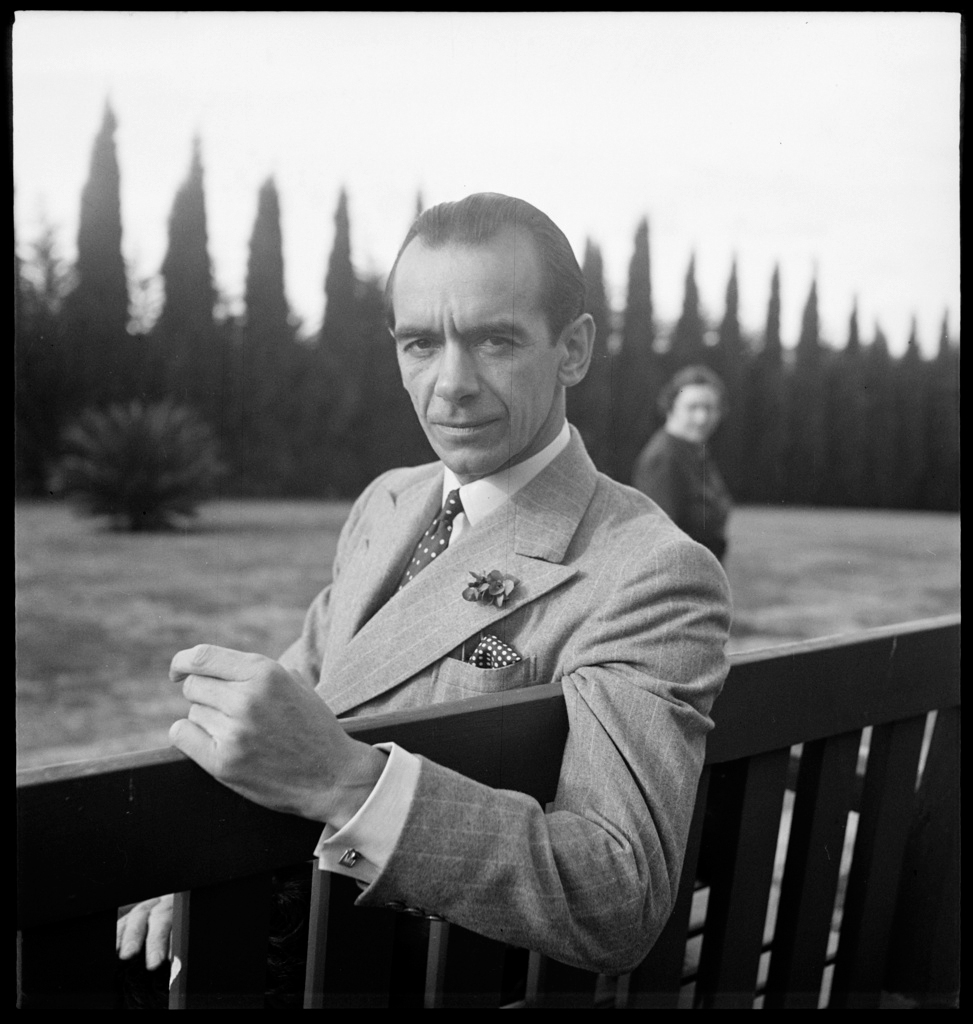
Malcolm Sargent, conductor of the premiere

The premiere was given on 8 October in Leeds Town Hall. Sargent conducted the festival chorus and the London Symphony Orchestra, with the baritone soloist Dennis Noble. The work was an immediate success and has remained one of Walton's most celebrated compositions. Walton dedicated the cantata to his friend and benefactor Lord Berners.

The London premiere was at the Queen's Hall on 25 November 1931. Adrian Boult conducted the BBC Symphony Orchestra and the National Chorus, with the baritone soloist Stuart Robertson. Between the two premieres, the music critic of The Times, H. C. Colles, wrote:

Let not the Three Choirs of Worcester, Gloucester, and Hereford think that because this finale begins with "Sing aloud to God" and ends in antiphonal alleluias they may find here a suitable novelty for their Cathedrals. Belshazzar's Feast is stark Judaism from first to last. It culminates in ecstatic gloating over the fallen enemy, the utter negation of Christianity. Its power as a dramatic oratorio compels admiration, but it is no more a "sacred" oratorio than is Handel's on the same subject.

In Kennedy's view these words "made their mark on the ecclesiastical powers of the Three Choirs Festival, who refused to admit Belshazzar's Feast into their cathedrals". Plans to perform it at the 1932 festival were abandoned at the insistence of Ivor Atkins, organist of Worcester Cathedral, who considered Sitwell's libretto unsuitable for church performance. The festival authorities maintained the ban for twenty-five years.

The work was performed at the ISCM Festival in Amsterdam in 1933, conducted by Constant Lambert. Leopold Stokowski conducted performances with the Philadelphia Orchestra in January 1934. Sargent regularly programmed it throughout the rest of his career, and took it as far afield as Australia, Brussels, Vienna and Boston. Not only British conductors from Sargent to Simon Rattle, but also Eugene Ormandy, Maurice Abravanel, André Previn, Robert Shaw, Leonard Slatkin and Andrew Litton have recorded the work. In 1947 Herbert von Karajan called it "the best choral music that's been written in the last 50 years". Karajan only performed the work once, in 1948 in Vienna, but it was a performance that moved Walton to tears and he expressed amazement that he could ever have written such a wonderful work.

The work was finally admitted to the Three Choirs Festival on 2 September 1957 in Worcester Cathedral, performed by the baritone Hervey Alan. the festival choir and the City of Birmingham Symphony Orchestra conducted by David Willcocks. (Note: The music critic J. F. Waterhouse commented that the 1957 festival was heavily weighted to Old Testament themes, with Mendelssohn's Elijah, Honegger's King David, Vaughan Williams's Job and Ernest Bloch's Avodath Hakodesh all programmed, in addition to Walton's cantata.) As late as 1973, in his study of Walton's music Frank Howes wrote, "Deans and Chapters are more broad-minded in these matters than formerly … but a sense of what is fitting does indicate that its place is not in church".

== Synopsis ==
In the story of Belshazzar's Feast, the Jews are in exile in Babylon. At a feast at which Belshazzar, the Babylonian king, commits sacrilege by using the Jews' sacred vessels to praise the heathen gods, his doom is foretold by a ghostly hand writing on the wall. That night he is killed and his kingdom collapses.

== Sections ==
Although not specified in the published score, the text forms a triptych, each section of which is sub-divided.

1	2	3
[Introduction] Thus spake Isaiah; If I forget thee, O Jerusalem; By the waters of Babylon	[Transition] Babylon was a great city In Babylon, Belshazzar the King made a great feast Praise ye the God of Gold; Thus in Babylon, the mighty city	[Transition] And in that same hour, as they feasted Then sing aloud to God our strength The trumpeters and pipers are silent Then sing aloud to God our strength

== Text ==
Libretto, assembled by Osbert Sitwell from biblical sources, primarily the Book of Daniel and Psalm 137

Thus spake Isaiah –
Thy sons that thou shalt beget
They shall be taken away
And be eunuchs
In the palace of the King of Babylon
Howl ye, howl ye, therefore:
For the day of the Lord is at hand!

By the waters of Babylon,
There we sat down, yea, we wept
And hanged our harps upon the willows.

For they that wasted us
Required of us mirth;
They that carried us away captive
Required of us a song.
Sing us one of the songs of Zion.

How shall we sing the Lord's song
In a strange land?

If I forget thee, O Jerusalem,
Let my right hand forget her cunning.
If I do not remember thee,
Let my tongue cleave to the roof of my mouth.
Yea, if I prefer not Jerusalem above my chief joy.

By the waters of Babylon,
There we sat down: yea, we wept.

O daughter of Babylon, who art to be destroyed,
Happy shall he be that taketh thy children
And dasheth them against a stone,
For with violence shall that great city Babylon be thrown down
And shall be found no more at all.

Babylon was a great city,
Her merchandise was of gold and silver,
Of precious stones, of pearls, of fine linen,
Of purple, silk and scarlet,
All manner vessels of ivory,
All manner vessels of most precious wood,
Of brass, iron and marble,
Cinnamon, odours and ointments,
Of frankincense, wine and oil,
Fine flour, wheat and beasts,
Sheep, horses, chariots, slaves
And the souls of men.

In Babylon
Belshazzar the King
Made a great feast,
Made a feast to a thousand of his lords,
And drank wine before the thousand.

Belshazzar, whiles he tasted the wine,
Commanded us to bring the gold and silver vessels:
Yea, the golden vessels, which his father, Nebuchadnezzar,
Had taken out of the temple that was in Jerusalem.

He commanded us to bring the golden vessels
Of the temple of the house of God,
That the King, his Princes, his wives
And his concubines might drink therein.

Then the King commanded us:
Bring ye the cornet, flute, sackbut, psaltery
And all kinds of music: they drank wine again,
Yea, drank from the sacred vessels,
And then spake the King:

Praise ye
The God of Gold
Praise ye
The God of Silver
Praise ye
The God of Iron
Praise ye
The God of Wood
Praise ye
The God of Stone
Praise ye
The God of Brass
Praise ye the Gods.

Thus in Babylon, the mighty city
Belshazzar the King made a great feast,
Made a feast to a thousand of his lords,
And drank wine before the thousand.

Belshazzar whiles he tasted the wine
Commanded us to bring the gold and silver vessels
That his Princes, his wives and his concubines
Might rejoice and drink therein.

After they had praised their strange gods,
The idols and the devils,
False gods who can neither see nor hear,
Called they for the timbrel and the pleasant harp
To extol the glory of the King.
Then they pledged the King before the people,
Crying, Thou, O King, art King of Kings:
O King, live for ever...

And in that same hour, as they feasted
Came forth fingers of a man's hand
And the King saw
The part of the hand that wrote.

And this was the writing that was written:
'MENE, MENE, TEKEL UPHARSIN
THOU ART WEIGHED IN THE BALANCE
AND FOUND WANTING'.
In that night was Belshazzar the King slain
And his kingdom divided.

Then sing aloud to God our strength:
Make a joyful noise unto the God of Jacob.
Take a psalm, bring hither the timbrel,
Blow up the trumpet in the new moon,
Blow up the trumpet in Zion
For Babylon the Great is fallen, fallen.
Alleluia!

Then sing aloud to God our strength:
Make a joyful noise unto the God of Jacob,
While the Kings of the Earth lament
And the merchants of the Earth
Weep, wail and rend their raiment.
They cry, Alas, Alas, that great city,
In one hour is her judgement come.

The trumpeters and pipers are silent,
And the harpers have ceased to harp,
And the light of a candle shall shine no more.

Then sing aloud to God our strength.
Make a joyful noise to the God of Jacob.
For Babylon the Great is fallen. Alleluia!

== Musical structure ==
Cover of orchestral score

The first section of the work illustrates the plight and despair of the exiled Jews; the second shows the state of Babylon, its sensual revelling and its downfall; the third is about the liberation and rejoicing of the Jews in which according to a 2004 analysis "jubilation is combined with hatred, delight combined with loathing".

The music throughout is strongly rhythmic and richly orchestrated. The rhythms and harmonies reflect Walton's interest in jazz and other popular music pressed into service to tell a religious story. Despite its jagged rhythms and strident orchestral effects, the work is essentially conventional in its tonality, although it is scored without a key signature and passes through many keys. Walton's biographer Michael Kennedy writes, "diatonicism is at the root of the matter … string tremolandi, brass fanfares, and masterly use of unaccompanied declaration work their customary spell." Kennedy adds that the chilling orchestral sounds that introduce the writing on the wall derive from Richard Strauss's Salome.

Walton's huge orchestra allows him to take advantage of many orchestral timbres to make the narrative more vivid. In the section where the Babylonians are worshipping their gods each iteration of "Praise ye the god of ..." is completed with a noun such as silver, iron, wood, and brass. Each statement is followed by a different orchestral interlude, featuring a timbre appropriate to the noun. The noun "silver" is followed with the playing of the glockenspiel and triangle, "iron" is represented by the striking of an anvil, "wood" is followed by xylophone and wood block, and for "brass" there is an array of horns, trumpets and trombones.

By contrast Walton uses silence at strategic points to build suspense, as in the passage where the Jews express outrage at the sacrilegious use of their sacred vessels: their exclamation of horror is followed by a whole bar of complete silence, allowing the heinousness of the Babylonians' actions to sink in. At one point, singing is abandoned altogether: the soloist sings, "In that night was Belshazzar the King slain and his kingdom divided" but before his last four words the whole chorus shouts the word "slain". After a short silence the singing resumes with the Jews' exultant "Then sing aloud to God our strength".

=== Scoring and duration ===
- Baritone solo
- Double mixed chorus (SSAATTBB); and Semi-chorus (SSAATTBB)
- 2 flutes, piccolo, 2 oboes, cor anglais (only if no saxophone), three clarinets in B♭ (second doubling clarinet in E♭, third doubling bass clarinet in B♭), alto saxophone in E♭, 2 bassoons, contrabassoon
- 4 horns in F, 3 trumpets, 2 tenor trombones, bass trombone, tuba; timpani, 3 or 4 percussionists (side drum, tenor drum, bass drum, triangle, tambourine, castanets, cymbals, gong, xylophone, glockenspiel, wood block, whip, anvil); 2 harps; piano (optional); organ; and strings.
- Two brass bands, each consisting of: 3 trumpets, and optionally 2 tenor trombones, bass trombone, tuba.

The playing time of the cantata is about 35 minutes.

== Recordings ==
Conductor	Baritone	Chorus	Orchestra	Year
William Walton	Dennis Noble	Huddersfield Choral Society	Liverpool Philharmonic Orchestra	1943
Sir Adrian Boult	Dennis Noble	London Philharmonic Choir	London Philharmonic Orchestra	1954
Sir Malcolm Sargent	James Milligan	Huddersfield Choral Society	Royal Liverpool Philharmonic Orchestra	1958
Eugene Ormandy	Walter Cassel	Rutgers University Choir	Philadelphia Orchestra	1961
Sir William Walton	Donald Bell	Philharmonia Chorus	Philharmonia Orchestra	1961
Roger Wagner	John Cameron	Roger Wagner Chorale	Royal Philharmonic Orchestra	1962
Maurice Abravanel	Robert Peterson	University of Utah Civic Chorale	Utah Symphony Orchestra	1971
André Previn	John Shirley-Quirk	London Symphony Chorus	London Symphony Orchestra	1972
James Loughran	Michael Rippon	Hallé Choir	Hallé Orchestra	1974
Alexander Gibson	Sherrill Milnes	Scottish National Orchestra Chorus	Scottish National Orchestra	1977
André Previn	Benjamin Luxon	Brighton Festival Chorus, Collegium Musicum of London	Royal Philharmonic Orchestra	1986
Richard Hickox	David Wilson-Johnson	London Symphony Chorus	London Symphony Orchestra	1989
Robert Shaw	William Stone	Atlanta Symphony Chorus	Atlanta Symphony Orchestra	1989
Sir Georg Solti	Benjamin Luxon	London Philharmonic Choir	London Philharmonic Orchestra	1989
Sir David Willcocks	Gwynne Howell	Bach Choir	Philharmonia Orchestra	1989
Leonard Slatkin	Thomas Allen	London Philharmonic Choir	London Philharmonic Orchestra	1992
Sir Andrew Davis	Bryn Terfel	BBC Singers, BBC Symphony Chorus	BBC Symphony Orchestra	1994
Andrew Litton	Bryn Terfel	Winchester Cathedral Choir, Waynflete Singers	Bournemouth Symphony Orchestra	1995
Sir Simon Rattle	Thomas Hampson	Cleveland Orchestra Chorus, CBSO Chorus	City of Birmingham Symphony Orchestra	1998
Paul Daniel	Christopher Purves	Huddersfield Choral Society	English Northern Philharmonia	2004
Sir Colin Davis	Peter Coleman-Wright	London Symphony Chorus	London Symphony Orchestra	2011

Source: WorldCat and Naxos Music Library

== Notes, references and sources ==
=== Sources ===
- Aldous, Richard (2001). Tunes of Glory: The Life of Malcolm Sargent. London: Hutchinson. ISBN 0-09-180131-1.
- Craggs, Stewart R., ed. (1999). William Walton: Music and Literature. Aldershot: Ashgate Publishing. ISBN 1-85928-190-7.
- Howes, Frank (1973). The Music of William Walton (second ed.). London: Oxford University Press. ISBN 978-0-19-315431-5.
- Kelly, Ryan (2004). "Walton's 'Belshazzar's Feast': A Masterly Storytelling". The Choral Journal. 44 (7): 27–37. (subscription required)
- Kennedy, Michael (1989). Portrait of Walton. Oxford University Press. ISBN 0-19-816705-9.
- Lloyd, Stephen (2001). William Walton: Muse of Fire. Boydell Press. ISBN 978-0851158037.
- Osborne, Richard (1998). Herbert von Karajan. London: Chatto & Windus. ISBN 1-85619-763-8.
- Palmer, Christopher (1989). Belshazzar's Feast. Hayes: EMI. OCLC 16942630.
- Reid, Charles (1968). Malcolm Sargent: A Biography. London: Hamish Hamilton Ltd. ISBN 978-0-24-191316-1.
- Walton, William (2007). Belshazzar's Feast: For Mixed Choir, Baritone Solo, and Orchestra. Oxford: Oxford University Press. ISBN 978-0-19-368308-2.
