= Leeds Festival (disambiguation) =

Leeds Festival may refer to:

- Reading and Leeds Festivals (1999-), a rock music festival in Leeds (in Bramham Park since 2003), West Yorkshire, England
- Leeds Festival (classical music) (1858-1985), European classical music festival in Leeds
- Leeds Festival Chorus, choir founded in 1858 for first Leeds Festival and still active
