= The Story of Gilbert and Sullivan =

1953 film by Sidney Gilliat

- Directed by: Sidney Gilliat
- Written by: Sidney Gilliat; Leslie Baily
- Based on: The Gilbert and Sullivan Book by Leslie Baily
- Produced by: Frank Launder; Sidney Gilliat
- Starring: Robert Morley; Maurice Evans
- Cinematography: Christopher Challis
- Edited by: Gerald Turney-Smith
- Music by: Arthur Sullivan; W. S. Gilbert
- Production company: London Films
- Distributed by: British Lion Films
- Release date: 7 September 1953
- Running time: 111 minutes
- Country: United Kingdom
- Language: English
- Box office: £98,139 (UK)

The Story of Gilbert and Sullivan (also known as Gilbert & Sullivan and The Great Gilbert and Sullivan) is a 1953 British musical drama film dramatisation of the collaboration between Gilbert and Sullivan. Librettist W. S. Gilbert and composer Arthur Sullivan, portrayed by Robert Morley and Maurice Evans, co-wrote fourteen extraordinarily successful comic operas, later referred to as the Savoy Operas, which continue to be popular today.

The film, directed by Sidney Gilliat, is based on Leslie Baily's The Gilbert and Sullivan Book, and Baily co-wrote the screenplay with Gilliat. Shot in Technicolor, it was produced by Gilliat and Frank Launder for London Films in time to mark the coronation of Queen Elizabeth II. The film was a box-office failure.

== Description ==
In addition to describing the ups and downs of the partnership between Gilbert and Sullivan, and their relationships with their producer, Richard D'Oyly Carte, the movie depicts many of the people who performed in the original runs of the operas and includes extensive musical excerpts from the works, staged with the assistance of Martyn Green, who advised on the performance practices of the D'Oyly Carte Opera Company. The film is similar in style to other popular biopics of the era, such as The Great Caruso, and takes considerable dramatic licence with factual details and moves events in time. For example, the opening night of Iolanthe is depicted as being the opening of the Savoy Theatre, whereas the Savoy Theatre actually opened earlier, during the run of Patience. The music in the film is played by the London Symphony Orchestra, conducted by Sir Malcolm Sargent.

The film starred Robert Morley as W.S. Gilbert, Maurice Evans as Arthur Sullivan, Peter Finch as Richard D'Oyly Carte, Eileen Herlie as Helen Carte and Martyn Green as George Grossmith. Appearances were also made by Dinah Sheridan as Grace Marston, Wilfrid Hyde-White as Mr. Marston, Leonard Sachs as Smythe, Owen Brannigan as the company's principal heavy baritone, Thomas Round as the company's principal tenor, Isabel Dean as Mrs. Gilbert, Arthur Howard as the Usher in Trial by Jury, Muriel Aked as Queen Victoria and Michael Ripper as Louis.

A 1999 film, Topsy-Turvy, also treats the Gilbert and Sullivan partnership, as do several stage entertainments, including Knights of Song, which premiered in 1938 on Broadway, the play Dr Sullivan and Mr Gilbert (1993), and the musicals The Savoyards, by Donald Madgwick (1971), Tarantara Tarantara, by Ian Taylor (1975) and Sullivan and Gilbert by Ken Ludwig (1983). In the short 1950 film, The Return of Gilbert and Sullivan, Gilbert and Sullivan contemporarily appear to protest the jazz treatment of their operas.

== Plot ==
The young composer Arthur Sullivan is encouraged by his friends and fiancée, Grace, to pursue the creation of "serious" works, such as his cantata The Prodigal Son, but he is pleased by the acclaim that he receives for the music to the short comic opera Trial by Jury, a collaboration with dramatist W.S. Gilbert. Grace leaves him, telling him that he is wasting his musical gifts on triviality, foreshadowing criticism from the musical establishment that will follow Sullivan for the rest of his career.

Still wrestling with this dilemma, Sullivan joins Gilbert and the impresario Richard D'Oyly Carte in a partnership to create more light operas. Their subsequent operas, The Sorcerer and, especially, H.M.S. Pinafore, become so successful they are extensively pirated in America. The entire company goes on tour there so that the partnership can profit from their appreciation in the new world. The Pirates of Penzance premieres in New York to much acclaim, and Carte soon builds a new theatre in London to present the partnership's operas. Everyone is delighted.

The Savoy Theatre opens with the opening night of Iolanthe. Sullivan revels in the atmosphere of the premiere, while Gilbert, as usual, is nervous and apprehensive. At the opening, Carte demonstrates the safety of the theatre's innovative electric lighting. Sullivan conducts the performance, but Gilbert escapes the theatre to walk the streets, returning just in time to take a triumphant curtain call before the enthusiastic crowd. Nevertheless, Sullivan is unhappy writing comic opera.

When Gilbert proposes a new piece involving the device of a magic lozenge, Sullivan objects that he wants to devote himself to serious music. Sullivan's friend, critic Joseph Bennett, writes a libretto for a cantata based on Henry Wadsworth Longfellow's The Golden Legend. Meanwhile, Gilbert, inspired by the sight of a Japanese sword hanging in his study, proposes a new plot, and Sullivan begins work. When Bennett goes to see Sullivan, he finds that The Mikado is being rehearsed instead of his cantata. He informs Sullivan that, if he would get around to finishing The Golden Legend, Queen Victoria will attend the premiere. Likewise, when Gilbert calls on Sullivan, he sees him rehearsing The Golden Legend, as Bennett stands watch. When Bennett dozes off, Sullivan turns back to The Mikado. After both works debut, Sullivan is knighted. The Queen inquires if he will write a grand opera.

Just before the premiere of their next opera, Ruddigore, Sullivan asks Gilbert to write the libretto for his first grand opera. Gilbert declines, stating that in such a work the words play second fiddle to the music, and Sullivan is angered saying that he has always had to hold the music back so that the words could predominate, and that he no longer takes pleasure in writing comic operas. Ruddigore receives negative reviews and some negative audience response. Although the piece is eventually a financial success, author and composer remain at odds. Mrs. Helen Carte travels to Monte Carlo to see Sullivan on holiday. She gives him the news that her husband will build another theatre to present grand opera, and wants Sullivan to compose an opera for the theatre. Sullivan happily agrees, but at the same time, Gilbert has written a libretto for another comic opera. Sullivan also accepts this libretto, and The Gondoliers is another hit.

Gilbert, suffering from gout, and in a particularly foul temper, examines the financial accounts of the partnership, seeing a large item for the purchase of a new carpet at the Savoy Theatre. He confronts Carte, at the new theatre, over lavish expenses. He also quarrels with Sullivan, and Gilbert announces that he will write no more Savoy operas. Sullivan's grand opera Ivanhoe debuts, and he presents a bound volume to the Queen. She commands a private performance at Windsor Castle but astonishes Sullivan by choosing to hear The Gondoliers. Apart from Gilbert, Sullivan comes to realise that his true gifts lie with light music.

Richard and Helen Carte toast the arrival of the twentieth century, hoping for a revival of the Gilbert and Sullivan partnership. Stopping by at a rehearsal for a revival of The Yeomen of the Guard, Gilbert runs into Sullivan, after having been apart for years. Sullivan is ill and using a wheelchair. The two men make up and propose taking a curtain call together with Carte, all three of them in wheelchairs. During the performance, however, news arrives of Sullivan's death. Some years later, Gilbert is finally knighted.

== Cast ==
- Robert Morley as W. S. Gilbert
- Maurice Evans as Arthur Sullivan
- Eileen Herlie as Helen D'Oyly Carte
- Martyn Green as George Grossmith
- Peter Finch as Richard D'Oyly Carte
- Dinah Sheridan as Grace Marston
- Isabel Dean as Mrs. Gilbert
- Wilfrid Hyde-White as Mr. Marston
- Muriel Aked as Queen Victoria
- Michael Ripper as Louis
- Bernadette O'Farrell as Jessie Bond
- Ann Hanslip as Principal soprano
- Eric Berry as Rutland Barrington
- Lloyd Lamble as Joseph Bennett
- Richard Warner as Alfred Cellier
- Muriel Brunskill as Principal contralto
- Owen Brannigan as Principal bass
- Harold Williams as Judge in Trial by Jury
- Arthur Howard as Usher in Trial by Jury
- Thomas Round as Defendant in Trial by Jury and Nanki Poo in The Mikado
- Yvonne Marsh as Bride in Trial by Jury

Among the additional singing voices heard on the soundtrack are Webster Booth, Owen Brannigan, Muriel Brunskill, John Cameron, Elsie Morison, Marjorie Thomas, Jennifer Vyvyan and Harold Williams.

== Development ==
In 1936, Michael Balcon bought the rights to a play about the lives of Gilbert and Sullivan by Lesser Samuels and Marion Dex. However he wanted permission from the estates of Gilbert and Sullivan before he would make it, and no film resulted. By 1950, Alexander Korda had secured permission from the D'Oyly Carte Opera Company to use "songs and scenes" from Gilbert and Sullivan operas in a film to be made the next year. Korda had negotiated with Bridget D'Oyly Carte, granddaughter of Richard, for the rights. Sullivan's music would go into public domain at the end of 1950, but Gilbert's lyrics were still in copyright until 1961.

Korda's nephew Michael Korda later claimed his uncle "loathed Gilbert and Sullivan and hated musicals in general, but Gilliat and Launder had urged him to finance the movie, and he had reluctantly agreed to do so on the basis of their past record. ... [H]e allowed himself to be convinced that the vast audience of Gilbert and Sullivan fans would make the film an international success." In February 1951, Sidney Gilliat announced that he would work on the film while Frank Launder would work on Beauty Queen, which became Lady Godiva Rides Again. The film was made to mark both the coronation of Queen Elizabeth II (her ancestor Victoria appears in several scenes) and the 21st birthday of London Films.

== Production ==
In March 1951, Korda said the film "would not be a straight biography but rather an episodic treatment of the Gilbert and Sullivan era, which will also include their music and biographical material." The script was written by Gilliat and Leslie Baily, who had written The Gilbert and Sullivan Book and a BBC film on Gilbert and Sullivan. They decided to focus the script on the conflict between the composers caused by Sullivan's feeling that he was wasting his time writing comic operas. They used sections of eight of the Gilbert and Sullivan works.

In August, The New York Times reported that the film would be Korda's "next big colour spectacle" after his adaptation of Tales of Hoffmann and would be designed by Hein Heckroth who designed The Red Shoes and The Tales of Hoffmann. Ralph Richardson and John Mills were the favourites to play the title roles. Bridget D'Oyly Carte was reported to be collaborating on the film and, according to The New York Times, "it is well known she believes in Gilbert and Sullivan being kept faithful to the traditions in every detail."

By March 1952, the lead roles had gone to Robert Morley and Maurice Evans, both actors best known for their stage work. Evans said he got the role when visiting Morley backstage, where he was appearing in The Little Hut; Evans accompanied Morley to Sidney Gilliat's house and wound up getting the role. "The poor man [Gilliat] had just had his appendix out and had no resistance, I suppose, so he signed me," said Evans. "Let's call the picture a reasonable facsimile of the truth," added Evans, who was working in England for the first time since 1935.

Filming began in April. During filming there were disagreements between production designer Hein Heckroth and supervisor Vincent Korda over the design. Filming finished in October 1952. According to the BFI, Alexander Korda "was keen that the film's main message, that a truly successful work of art contains elements of the vulgar and populist as well as the rarefied, came through loud and clear. Given Korda's own fondness for straddling the art-versus-commerce divide, it's easy to see why this appealed to him." Gilliat later described a chaotic production that was initially underbudgeted, and said he and Korda clashed during filming.

== Reception ==
The film was a failure at the box office, taking in £98,139. It and The Beggar's Opera comprised the majority of what would be a £1 million (US$2.8 million, equivalent to $26.9 million in 2025) loss for the National Film Finance Corporation and led to British Lion being placed in receivership.

The Monthly Film Bulletin reviewer commented: "The respectfully dull costume productions of the Korda group since 1947 find full scope in this frightfully proper account ... it is never easy to distinguish between operetta and real-life narration. ... The colour is wonderful, the music is a feast of reminiscence for G & S fans, the technical qualities are precise, the score is (just) out of copyright and the story is very, very English. No comment will prevent those who love Gilbert and Sullivan from visiting and enjoying this picture ... all will probably be bored for at least some of the time."

== See also ==
- Topsy-Turvy

== Notes ==
- Korda, Michael (1980). Charmed Lives. Allen Lane.
