= Robert Sims (baritone) =

American singer

Robert Lewis Sims (born in Chicago, Illinois) is a lyric baritone who specializes in African-American folk songs and spirituals, known for his rich tone, energetic performances and convincing stage presence.

Robert Sims, who was a Gold Medal winner of the American Traditions Competition, gave the first all spiritual and folk song recital at Carnegie Hall’s Zankel Hall in 2005. In March 2009, he was invited by Jessye Norman to participate in Honor! A Celebration of the African American Cultural Legacy at Carnegie Hall. Sims has performed in recital with folk legend Odetta and renowned opera and concert singers George Shirley, William Warfield, Simon Estes, Benjamin Matthews, and Jubilant Sykes. Equally at home with standard operatic literature and classic jazz, Robert has collaborated with the Georgia Guitar Quartet in songs from Bernstein to Bob Dylan. He joined David Baker and Mercedes Ellington for Duke Ellington’s The Sacred Concerts and My People, and in 1997 toured Japan with the Pacific Music Festival Orchestra performing Leonard Bernstein's Opening Prayer. A favorite at Dr. Robert Schuller’s Crystal Cathedral in Garden Grove, California, Sims has appeared on several Hour of Power international telecasts.

Sims performed with the Tabernacle Choir at Temple Square on a special broadcast of the choir's long-running Music and the Spoken Word in January 2011 and January 2019.

== Education ==
Robert Sims is a graduate of Oberlin Conservatory of Music, where he studied with Richard Miller, Binghamton University, Northwestern University, and the American Conservatory of Music. He has also studied at the Music Academy of the West, Chautauqua Musical Institute, and the Oberlin/Urbania Vocal Institute in Urbania, Italy.

== Achievements ==
Lyric Opera of Chicago Education Award 1982 Friedrich Schorr Opera Award Winner 1993 Founder of Canti Classics Artist Management and Production Company with Everton Swearing and Arthur White 1998 PBS Television Special “He’s Got Spirit” Art Beat Chicago 1998 American Traditions Gold Medal Winner 1999 Founder of Three Generations, (vocal trio) with Benjamin Matthews and William Warfield 1999
