= GGQ =

GGQ may refer to:

- GGQ motif, a conserved amino acid sequence in Eukaryotic translation termination factor 1
- GGQ, telegraph code for Guangzhou East railway station, China
- Georgia Guitar Quartet, band in Georgia, United States
- GGQ, division code for Gaogang, Taizhou, China
