= Richard Miller (singer) =

American singer

Richard Miller (April 9, 1926 – May 5, 2009) was a professor of singing at Oberlin College Conservatory of Music and the author of numerous books on singing technique and vocal pedagogy. He also sang recitals, oratorios, and numerous roles as a lyric tenor with major opera companies in Europe and America.

== Early life and career ==
Richard Miller was born April 9, 1926, in Canton, Ohio, as the youngest of 5 children. He began singing publicly at age three and a half. Before his voice changed, at age 11, he sang hundreds of times in the Canton, Ohio, area. Advised not to sing during the voice-change period, he studied piano, cello, and organ, but then returned to singing, in musicals at Lincoln High School in Canton. He was drafted upon graduation from high school in 1944, assigned to the 7th Armored Division tank corps and sent to the European theater in January 1945, attached to the British First Army. Stationed near Marseilles after the end of hostilities, he took voice lessons with baritone Edouard Tyrand at the Marseilles Conservatory.

Returning to the U.S. after the war, he pursued undergraduate studies at Westminster Choir College in Princeton NJ before transferring to University of Michigan. While in Princeton he met his future wife, linguist and choral singer Mary Dagger. They married in 1950, in Washington, DC.

He earned his M.Mus. degree in musicology from the University of Michigan and was then awarded a Fulbright Grant to study voice in Rome, Italy, at l’Accademia di Santa Cecilia. Accompanied by his wife, Mary Norman Dagger Miller, in 1951 he traveled to Italy, where the couple lived for two years. In Rome, he studied with Luigi Ricci. He then went on to sing for four years as leading lyric tenor at the opera house in Zürich, Switzerland. Two of the Millers' five children were born in those years.

He returned to the U.S. in 1957, and taught singing at the University of Michigan for five years, then at Baldwin-Wallace University and from 1964 at Oberlin Conservatory of Music for over 40 years, till his retirement in 2006. During those years, until age 60, he sang hundreds of performances of oratorio and opera, including appearances with the San Francisco and San Antonio Operas. He sang often with the Cleveland Orchestra under George Szell, Pierre Boulez, and Louis Lane, including the summer promenade concerts and all five of the Cleveland Orchestra's Lake Erie Opera seasons at Severance Hall.

== Vocal pedagogy pioneer ==
Although he was not formally trained as a scientist, he was always intensely curious about scientific aspects of singing. He became convinced, early in his teaching career, of the value of information about the physiology and acoustics of singing; in 1961 he developed a vocal pedagogy forum, through a journal published by the Music Teachers National Association, for discussion among voice teachers, to encourage openness to scientific approaches to the teaching of singing.

He became internationally known for his abilities as a teacher of singing; for many years he gave teaching sessions all over North America, Europe, Australia, and New Zealand. He authored eight books and hundreds of articles on the subject of singing.

Miller's collaboration with the Cleveland Clinic during the 1980s led to the development of the Oberlin Conservatory's Otto B. Schoepfle Vocal Arts Center (OBSVAC), an acoustic laboratory that measures vocal production and provides visual and auditory feedback to the singer. The vocal arts center at Oberlin was the first of its kind to be based within a music school.

== Notable students ==
Notable students of Richard Miller include:

- tenor, Salvatore Champagne
- tenor, David Miller
- soprano, Megan Marie Hart
- baritone, Robert Sims
- bass-baritone, Daniel Okulitch
- bass-baritone, Donald Bell
- mezzo-soprano, Elizabeth Fischer Monastero
- soprano, Edith Wiens

== Overview of work as teacher and voice scientist ==
Richard Miller was Wheeler Professor of Performance at Oberlin Conservatory, where he taught 42 years. In addition to founding and directing the Vocal Arts Center (OBSVAC) at Oberlin Conservatory, he was a member of the Collegium Medicorum Theatri and American Academy of Teachers of Singing and was on the Otolaryngology Adjunct Staff of the Cleveland Clinic Foundation.

One remarkable event in his 42 years teaching singing at Oberlin grew out of a great tragedy. On April 30, 1970, as the war in Vietnam continued to escalate, President Richard M. Nixon announced a U.S. military invasion of Cambodia. Nixon's widening of the already unpopular war in Indochina sparked protests, especially on college campuses. On May 4, 1970, four antiwar student protesters were shot to death by the Ohio National Guard on the Kent State University campus and two student protesters at Jackson State University were killed by Mississippi police. The killings of student protestors led to further anguish and turmoil on a number of college campuses, including Oberlin, and Oberlin College officially decided to cancel classes for the rest of the academic year. Oberlin Conservatory students gathered and came up with a plan to take positive action in the face of the killings. On May 10, 1970, Richard Miller was tenor soloist when Oberlin Conservatory faculty and students traveled to D.C. to express opposition to war and violence by offering a peaceful musical response to the tragedies: a performance of Mozart's Requiem at the Washington National Cathedral.

Miller taught for 28 years at the Mozarteum International Summer Academy in Salzburg, Austria. He presented lectures and classes at the Paris Conservatory (Conservatoire national supérieur de musique de Paris), at the Marseilles National Opera School, and at Centre Polyphonique.

In 2006, he retired from the Oberlin Conservatory, where he had taught for more than forty years. After retirement, he continued to teach some masterclasses. Internationally renowned for these masterclasses, he taught in Austria, Australia, Canada, England, France, Germany, New Zealand, Norway, Portugal, Sweden, Switzerland, and 38 US states.

== Awards ==
In 1989 he received an honorary doctorate from Gustavus Adolphus College.

In May 1990, he was decorated Chevalier/Officier into the French Order of Arts and Letters at the hand of Madame Régine Crespin "in recognition of contributions to the art of vocalism in France and throughout the world". He received a special recognition award by the New York Singing Teachers' Association in 2002. In 2006 Miller received the Voice Education Research Awareness Award from the Voice Foundation for his contributions to the field of voice communication.

== Writings ==
He has written articles for over 120 professional journals. He also edited several musical anthologies and collections.

His books include:

- National Schools of Singing (Scarecrow, 1977, reissued 1997) ISBN 9780810832374
- The Structure of Singing: System and Art in Vocal Technique (Schirmer Books/Macmillan, 1986) ISBN 978-0534255350
- Training Tenor Voices (Schirmer Books/Macmillan, 1993) ISBN 9780028713977
- On the Art of Singing (Oxford University Press, 1996) ISBN 9780195098259
- Singing Schumann: An Interpretive Guide for Performers (Oxford University Press, 1999) ISBN 9780195181975
- Training Soprano Voices (Oxford University Press, 2000) ISBN 9780195130188
- Solutions for Singers: Tools for Performers and Teachers (Oxford University Press, 2004) ISBN 9780195160055
- Securing Baritone, Bass-Baritone, and Bass Voices (Oxford University Press, 2008) ISBN 9780195322651
