= Nikita Koshkin =

Russian composer

Nikita Arnoldovich Koshkin (Russian: Никита Арнольдович Кошкин; born 28 February 1956) is a classical guitarist-composer born in Moscow USSR.

His early influences included Stravinsky, Shostakovich and Prokofiev, as well as rock music. Koshkin first came to prominence with his suite The Prince's Toys, completed in 1980 and first performed by the Czech-born guitarist Vladimir Mikulka.

Koshkin's best-known guitar work is Usher-Waltz (1984), a piece inspired by the Edgar Allan Poe story The Fall of the House of Usher, written for the guitarist Vladislav Blaha. It was made famous by John Williams' performance in the Seville Concert CD in 1993. Other famous performers of Koshkin's work include the Assad Duo and the Zagreb and Amsterdam Trios. His other important works include the set of variations The Porcelain Tower and the Andante quasi Passacaglia e Toccata: The Fall of Birds (1978). Besides writing works for solo guitar, Koshkin has composed guitar-ensemble music as well; in addition to numerous pieces for guitar duo, he has written two works for guitar quartet, Changing the Guard (1994) and Suite for Four Guitars (composed for the Georgia Guitar Quartet, 2007).

== Early life ==
Koshkin received his first guitar from his grandfather, along with a recording of Segovia's, which inspired him to become a guitarist, despite his parents intending a diplomatic career for him. Koshkin studied classical guitar at the Moscow College of Music under Georgi Emanov and later at the Gnessin Institute under Alexander Frauchi, with compositional teaching from Victor Egorov.

== Discography ==
=== As performer ===
- The Prince's Toys: Koshkin Plays Koshkin. SR 1011. Soundset Recordings, 1998.
- The Well-Tempered Koshkin. SR 1015. Soundset Recordings, 2001.
- Oratorium. kr10052. Kreuzberg Records, Germany.
