= Salvatore Champagne =

American opera singer

Salvatore Champagne is an American operatic tenor and the Director of the Division of Vocal Studies at the Oberlin Conservatory of Music. He earned a bachelor's degree in music at Oberlin College in 1985, where he studied with Richard Miller, and a master's degree in music at the Juilliard School in 1987. Champagne has sung in many opera houses throughout Europe including the Bavarian State Opera (Bayerische Staatsoper), the Zurich Opera House (Opernhaus Zürich), and Teatro Massimo Bellini and has also sung in concert under such composers as Leonard Bernstein, James Conlon, and Leonard Slatkin.

Awards and honors include 2nd place in the International Vocal Competition 's-Hertogenbosch and 2nd place Mirjam Helin International Singing Competition, Helsinki.

Professional affiliations include NATS (National Association for Teachers of Singing), College Music Society, and Opera America.
