= Marjorie Thomas =

British opera and oratorio singer (1923–2008)

Marjorie Gwendolen Thomas (5 June 1923 – 12 September 2008) was an English opera and oratorio singer for almost three decades. She sang at the Royal Opera House and was a regular performer at the Promenade Concerts and the Three Choirs Festivals and, for many years, a professor of singing at London's Royal Academy of Music. A favourite soloist of Sir Malcolm Sargent's, she also participated in a number of recordings of Gilbert and Sullivan operas.

== Biography ==
Thomas was born in Sunderland, England. Her father was a Welsh tenor, and her mother, an amateur pianist, was Scottish. When Thomas was two years old, her family moved to Oldham, Lancashire. She was educated at the Hulme Grammar School for Girls, then the Manchester High School for Girls from 1934 to 1939 and became a member of the choir at St Paul's Church in Oldham. She studied piano with her mother beginning at age 5, and later with William Walton's brother Noel. In 1940, at the age of 17, Thomas won a scholarship to the Royal Manchester College of Music to study piano. There, in her second term, she began to study singing with Elsie Thurston, which became her principal study, graduating in 1944. After this, she taught music for a year at Stockport Convent High School for Girls.

=== Singing career ===
After World War II, Thomas' warm, lyrical contralto voice was heard in opera and concerts in England for almost three decades. In 1945, Thomas debuted with the Hallé Orchestra under conductor John Barbirolli, in Edward Elgar's Sea Pictures. The same year, she sang the role of Konchakovna in Thomas Beecham's radio production of Alexander Borodin's Prince Igor. Beecham asked her for "more emotion" when he heard her audition but then added: "But how could you have experienced emotion – 22 and living in Manchester?" Nevertheless, he invited her back to perform at his 1946 Delius festival and for his second recording of George Frideric Handel's Messiah in 1947. Thereafter, she was often heard in Messiah. While rehearsing for Prince Igor, she met Edwin "Teddy" Gower, the sound engineer for the broadcast. The couple married in 1947.

Thomas took a year off from her career after the birth of her daughter, Eileen, in 1948. Her career then accelerated, both in opera and on the concert stage. In 1950, Thomas first sang the role of the Dryade in Ariadne auf Naxos at Glyndebourne and the Edinburgh Festival. She also sang Nancy in Albert Herring with Benjamin Britten's English Opera Group at the Cheltenham Festival in 1951. In 1953, she sang the roles of the Rhinemaiden Flosshilde in Das Rheingold and Götterdämmerung and the Valkyrie Rossweisse in Die Walküre in Rudolf Kempe's Covent Garden production of Wagner's ring cycle (also recording these roles) and Magdalena in Rafael Kubelík's Covent Garden production of Die Meistersinger von Nürnberg. With Kubelík, she also recorded Gustav Mahler's Third Symphony. In 1960, she created the role of Hermia in Benjamin Britten's opera, A Midsummer Night's Dream, which she performed at its premiere at Aldeburgh, then at the Holland festival and Covent Garden. William Walton wrote his Gloria for her in 1961. She also recorded a well-received complete Johannes Brahms Liebeslieder Waltzes, Op. 52 & 65, with Elsie Morison, Richard Lewis and Donald Bell, accompanied by Vitya Vronsky and Victor Babin. She also was known for performances and recordings of Johann Sebastian Bach's Christmas Oratorio, Mass in B Minor and Cantata No 6.

Thomas performed with Malcolm Sargent for the first time in 1951, with his Royal Choral Society and the Huddersfield Choral Society. She became one of his favourite soloists, often singing his orchestration of Brahms's Four Serious Songs. She continued to sing with both of these choirs in all of the oratorios conducted by Sargent until his death in 1967. She was, perhaps, most admired for her performances as Angel in Elgar's The Dream of Gerontius, which she recorded in 1954 with Sargent, the Huddersfield Choral Society and the Royal Liverpool Philharmonic Orchestra. The Daily Telegraph wrote of this recording: "The luminous beauty of her tone, her perfect diction and the warmth and dignity with which she invested the music are a lesson for young singers." With Sargent, she also recorded Felix Mendelssohn's Elijah Messiah, Vaughan Williams's Serenade to Music, Walton's Gloria and a series of Gilbert and Sullivan mezzo-soprano roles: Pitti-Sing in The Mikado (1957); Tessa in The Gondoliers (1957); Phoebe in The Yeomen of the Guard (1958); Cousin Hebe in H.M.S. Pinafore (1958); the title role in Iolanthe (1959); Kate in The Pirates of Penzance (1961); and Lady Angela in Patience (1963). She also is heard on the soundtrack of the 1953 film The Story of Gilbert and Sullivan.

During her career, Thomas sang in the United States and throughout Europe. She continued to perform in the 1960s, singing at an international performance of Bach's Mass in B Minor at the Vatican in 1963 that marked the election of Pope Paul VI and for the investiture of the Prince of Wales at Caernarfon in 1969. She retired from concert singing in 1973.

=== Teaching and later years ===
Thomas became a professor of singing at the Royal Manchester College of Music in 1960 and in 1964 accepted a post at London's Royal Academy of Music. She became the head of vocal studies there in 1984, where she taught until 1990. Her students included Susan Bullock and Dorothy Howard. After her retirement from the Academy of Music, she adjudicated at festivals and singing competitions.

Thomas died at the age of 85 after a long illness.
