= Elsie Morison =

Australian soprano (1924 - 2016)

Elsie Morison

Elsie Jean Morison AM (15 August 1924 – 5 April 2016) was an Australian operatic soprano.

== Early life ==
Morison was born in Ballarat, Victoria, to Alexander and Elsie Morison. As a child and teenager, she was interested in piano; however, her mother, who was a singing teacher, encouraged her in her vocal studies. Morison was educated at Clarendon Presbyterian Ladies' College, followed by the Albert Street Conservatorium in Melbourne from 1943 to 1945. Her teachers included Clive Carey, a visiting lecturer from England, with whom she continued studies at the Royal College of Music in London from 1947 to 1948.

== Career ==
Morison won the Dame Nellie Melba Scholarship in 1943, and the Queen's Prize at the Royal College of Music in 1947. She made her English concert debut at the Royal Albert Hall in Handel's Acis and Galatea in 1948 and that autumn joined Sadler's Wells Opera, appearing regularly there until 1954. She sang Anne Trulove in the first British staging of Stravinsky's The Rake's Progress in 1953 in Edinburgh, and at her Glyndebourne debut the following year. After a notable Covent Garden debut in 1953 as Mimi in Puccini's La bohème, she sang there regularly until 1962. She was admired for the touching sincerity of her acting and the lyrical warmth of her voice, in such roles as Susanna (The Marriage of Figaro), Pamina (The Magic Flute), Marzelline (Fidelio), Micaela (Carmen), Antonia (The Tales of Hoffmann), Marenka (The Bartered Bride), and Blanche in the British premiere of Poulenc's Dialogues of the Carmelites in 1958. In 1955 she created the title role of Arwel Hughes's Menna for the Welsh National Opera.

She appeared as an oratorio singer in Denmark, the Netherlands, France and the United Kingdom.

Among Morison's many recordings, those of Purcell, Handel and Michael Tippett's A Child of Our Time capture the grace and conviction of her singing. She has also recorded a well-received complete Brahms Liebeslieder Waltzes, Opp. 52 and 65, with Marjorie Thomas, Richard Lewis and Donald Bell, accompanied by Vitya Vronsky and Victor Babin.

Morison took the leading soprano roles in Sir Malcolm Sargent's Glyndebourne recordings of nine key Gilbert and Sullivan comic operas in the late 1950s and early 1960s, where she continued to work with Richard Lewis and Marjorie Thomas.

== Awards and recognition ==
In 1955, she received the Portuguese Order of Public Education. Her former school opened a memorial Elsie Morison Creative Arts Centre in 1985, and in 1999, she received the Order of Australia.

== Personal life ==
Her first husband was the British bass singer Kenneth Stevenson. In 1963, she married the Czech conductor Rafael Kubelík (his first wife, the violinist Ludmila Bertova, had died in 1961), and decided to retire from performing. She sang occasionally post-retirement, such as at a 1968 concert in Melbourne conducted by her husband, with her mother in the audience.

Morison died in Prague on 5 April 2016, aged 91.
