= Donald Bell (bass-baritone) =

Canadian opera singer

Donald Munro Bell (born 19 June 1934) is a Canadian bass-baritone and vocal pedagogue. For over four decades he actively performed in concerts and operas internationally. He retired from performance in 1994. As a vocal pedagogue he has researched and published studies on vocal acoustics and laryngeal function. He is the founder of the Vocal Arts Acoustical Research Group at the University of Calgary, where he currently serves on the voice faculty.

== Life and career ==
Born in South Burnaby, British Columbia, Bell graduated from South Burnaby High School in 1952. He began his voice studies in his youth with conductor and educator Nancy Paisley Benn. While studying with Benn, he made his professional debut in 1948 at the age of 14 as a soloist with the Vancouver Symphony Orchestra. He was then active as a recitalist and singer on CBC Radio while a high school student. After high school, he continued to perform and study with Benn while working for a Vancouver plywood mill for one year.

In 1953 Bell entered the Royal College of Music in London on a scholarship. Upon earning his artist diploma from the RCM in 1955, he was awarded the Harriet Cohen Award and Arnold Bax Memorial Medal. He then continued his studied in Berlin with Hermann Weißenborn from 1955 to 1957. He later studied singing with Edith Boroschek in Düsseldorf from 1967 to 1976, and with Richard Miller at the Oberlin Conservatory of Music from 1985 to 1990.

Bell made his professional opera debut at the Glyndebourne Festival Opera in 1955, which was followed by performances later that year at the Berlin State Opera. From 1958 to 1961 he was heard annually at the Bayreuth Festival as the Night Watchman in Richard Wagner's Die Meistersinger von Nürnberg. He appeared at the Berlin Festival in 1958 in Boris Blacher's Abstrakte Oper Nr. 1. In 1961 he portrayed Ford in Giuseppe Verdi's Falstaff in a CBC Television production starring Louis Quilico in the title role.

During the late 1950s and early 1960s, Bell was frequently heard as a soloist in choral-orchestral works with major symphony orchestras. In 1958 he appeared with the Berlin Philharmonic in Johann Sebastian Bach's St Matthew Passion. In 1959 he was a soloist in two different presentations of George Frideric Handel's Messiah: one in Lucerne with conductor Thomas Beecham and the other in Berlin under the baton of Malcolm Sargent. That same year he performed as a soloist with the Philadelphia Orchestra under Eugene Ormandy in concerts of Bach's Christmas Oratorio at the Academy of Music in Philadelphia and at Carnegie Hall in New York City. He made his first appearance with the New York Philharmonic singing in the inaugural concert of Lincoln Center's Philharmonic Hall (now David Geffen Hall) on 28 September 1962 with Leonard Bernstein conducting.

In 1961 Bell toured Israel and in 1963 he toured the USSR. He moved to Düsseldorf in 1964, where he worked for the next three years as a resident artist at the Deutsche Oper am Rhein. At that opera house he sang such roles as Amfortas in Parsifal, Count Almaviva in The Marriage of Figaro, Kurwenal in Tristan und Isolde, Méphistophélès in Faust, Wolfram in Tannhäuser, and the title role in Don Giovanni among others. In 1973 he performed the role of Alfred in the British premiere of Gottfried von Einem's Der Besuch der alten Dame at the Glyndebourne Festival. The following year he sang the part of Catiline in the premiere of Iain Hamilton's The Catiline Conspiracy at the Scottish Opera.

Bell retired from performance in 1994. He joined the faculty of voice at music department of the University of Calgary in 1982. He became a full professor at that institution in 1991.
