= Richard Lewis (tenor) =

British singer (1914–1990)

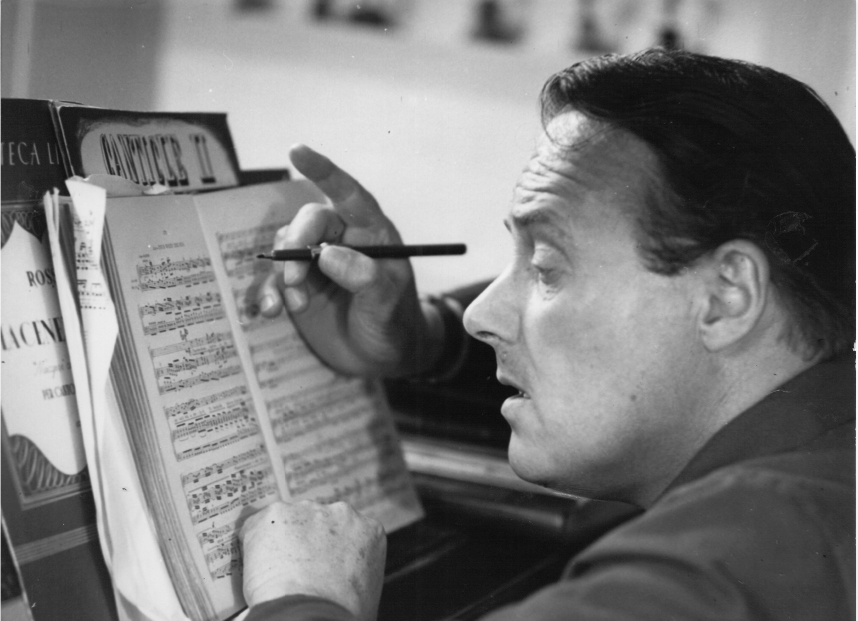

Richard Lewis CBE (10 May 1914 – 13 November 1990) was an English tenor of Welsh parentage.

== Life ==
Born Thomas Thomas in Manchester to Welsh parents, Lewis began his career as a boy soprano and studied at the Royal Manchester College of Music (now merged into the Royal Northern College of Music) from 1939 to 1941, and later at the Royal Academy of Music. He made his operatic debut in 1939, and from 1947 onwards, sang at the Glyndebourne Festival Opera and at Covent Garden (London). He made his debut in the United States in 1955.

Lewis made a number of recordings, including Messiah (Handel), L'incoronazione di Poppea (Monteverdi), Idomeneo (Mozart), Liebeslieder Walzer and Neue Liebeslieder Walzer (Brahms), Coleridge-Taylor's The Song of Hiawatha, Elgar's The Dream of Gerontius, Benjamin Britten's Spring Symphony (with Leonard Bernstein), scenes from William Walton's Troilus and Cressida, BBC Studio recording of The Mercy of Titus (La Clemenza di Tito) In English with Joan Sutherland, and four different performances of Mahler's Das Lied von der Erde, two with Maureen Forrester, (Reiner/Walter) one with Kathleen Ferrier (Barbirolli), and a fourth with Lili Chookasian (Ormandy). There is also a live recording with George Szell and the Cleveland Orchestra.

Lewis took the leading tenor roles in Sir Malcolm Sargent's "Glyndebourne" recordings of nine key Gilbert and Sullivan comic operas in the late 1950s and early 1960s where he worked with Elsie Morison and Marjorie Thomas.

In 1963, he was named a Commander of the Order of the British Empire (CBE). He died in Eastbourne in 1990.

== Legacy ==
Following Lewis's death in 1990 his widow, Elizabeth Lewis established the Richard Lewis/Jean Shanks award at Glyndebourne, made possible by funding from the pathologist Dr Jean Shanks (Princess Galitzine). In 2000 Elizabeth moved the award to the Royal Academy of Music wishing to help young singers at that more vulnerable time in their careers.

== See also ==
- Monteverdi: Il ritorno d'Ulisse in patria (Raymond Leppard recording)

== Literature ==
- D. Brook, Singers of Today (Revised Edition, Rockliff, London 1958), 135–139.
- Noel Ross-Russell, 'There will I sing – the making of Richard Lewis CBE' (Open Gate Press (March 1, 1997)
