= Leeds Festival (classical music) =

Classical music festival in Leeds, West Yorkshire (1858–1985)

The Leeds Festival, officially known as the Leeds Triennial Musical Festival, was a classical music festival which took place between 1858 and 1985 in Leeds, West Yorkshire, England.

== History ==
The first festival celebrated the opening of Leeds Town Hall by Queen Victoria on 7 September 1858. A second festival was held in 1874, then it was held every three years until 1970. For the two festivals in the 1870s, Sir Michael Costa was principal conductor. For the next seven festivals, until 1898, the principal conductor was Sir Arthur Sullivan. King George V was the festival's patron in 1922; his daughter, The Princess Royal, sister of King George VI, and her husband also became patrons in anticipation of their wedding in 1922. From the 1920s, Princess Mary had attended the opening nights and many of the festival's performances, and later, with her son, George Lascelles, 7th Earl of Harewood, and his wife, the Countess of Harewood, née Marion Stein, a former concert pianist. Lascelles was a noted music critic whose career included the role of artistic director of the Leeds Triennial Musical Festival (1958–74).

In April 1953, members of the public were for the first time told by the festival's chairman, Sir George Martin, that they may not be permitted to attend the rehearsals of some of the performances. In 1949, Sir George, an ex-Lord Mayor of Leeds (1947), had been president of the Leeds Chamber of Commerce. Leeds woollen manufacturer and solicitor, Mr R. Noel Middleton, was a member of the Executive Committee of the Festival and, in 1937, 1947 and 1950, he was chairman of the Programme Committee. Middleton was also chairman of the Northern Philharmonic Orchestra, of which the Princess Royal was patron. The Northern Philharmonic Orchestra first played at the Leeds Festival in 1937.

=== Dissolution ===
The last Leeds Triennial Musical Festival was held in 1985. The Leeds Festival Chorus, which was founded for the first festival, became independent in 1976, and continues to perform, broadcast and make recordings.

== Sources ==
- Mogridge, Geoffrey (25 March 2003). "Leeds Classical music: Triennial music festivals". Leeds City Council: Discovering Leeds. Archived from the original on 21 May 2014.
- Kennedy, Michael; Kennedy, Joyce (30 August 2012). "Leeds Festival". Oxford Dictionary of Music (online for subscribers, also in print). ISBN 978-0-19-957810-8.
