= Georgia Guitar Quartet =

The Georgia Guitar Quartet began in 1996 in Athens, Georgia at the behest of John Sutherland, instructor of guitar studies at the University of Georgia and pupil of Andrés Segovia. The quartet still comprises all four original founding members: Kyle Dawkins, Brian Smith, Phil Snyder, and Jason Solomon.

== Musical styles and recordings ==
The Georgia Guitar Quartet is known for performing a wide array of musical styles, including classical, experimental music, jazz, rock, bluegrass, celtic, etc. The quartet has released four CDs. Their first, self-titled CD (1997) contains standard compositions and arrangements for four guitars. Their second CD, "A Live Portrait" (1999), showcases the group's energetic live performances and demonstrates their emerging propensity for inventive arrangements and original compositions. This trend is fully fleshed out in the group's third release, entitled "Mosaic" (2004). This recording features one original composition and arrangements made either by or for the quartet. The ensemble's latest release, "Puzzle" (2007), features all-original compositions by the members of the group, including several collaborative compositions and structured improvisations. Among the composers who have recently written music specifically for the quartet are Russian composer Nikita Koshkin and American composer Leonard V. Ball.

== Performances ==
The Georgia Guitar Quartet performs regularly throughout the United States. In 2006, the quartet performed Joaquín Rodrigo's Concerto Andaluz with the Utah Symphony Orchestra at the Deer Valley Music Festival in Park City, Utah. In 2001, the Quartet was invited by Christopher Parkening to perform as the guest artists at his twenty-seventh annual masterclass in Bozeman, Montana. A review of their Piccolo Spoleto Festival performance in Charleston, South Carolina, described the concert as "a dazzling display of technical prowess, versatile programming, and audience rapport." The town of Athens, which boasts a rich musical heritage, has honored the ensemble by awarding them "Best Classical Artist" in Athens five years in a row at the Flagpole Music Awards presented by Flagpole Magazine.

== Discography ==
The Georgia Guitar Quartet (1997)
A Live Portrait (1999)
Mosaic (2004)
Puzzle (2007)
GGQ/Sims (2010)
