= Leeds Festival Chorus =

The Leeds Festival Chorus is based in Leeds, West Yorkshire, England. It has 140 singing members in soprano, alto, tenor and bass sections. Presenting classical choral music of a professional standard in Yorkshire and elsewhere, including at the BBC Proms and abroad - for example in Venice. The Chorus is broadcast regularly on BBC Radio 3.

The Chorus works with several orchestras, including the Hallé Orchestra, the BBC Symphony Orchestra, BBC Philharmonic, the Royal Northern Sinfonia, St. John's Smith Square, the Orchestra of Opera North and the English Chamber Orchestra.

== History ==
The Leeds Festival Chorus was first formed in 1858 (the year Queen Victoria opened the Leeds Town Hall) to sing at the first Leeds Musical Festival, and was reformed for each succeeding one, potential singers being auditioned from choirs in Leeds and surrounding areas. The Chorus became independent in 1985. It celebrated its 150th anniversary in 2008 with a performance of a specially-commissioned work by Judith Bingham - a world premiere. It has been conducted by many distinguished maestri in its long history, including Arthur Sullivan, Thomas Beecham, John Barbirolli, Carlo Maria Giulini, Jascha Horenstein, Hans Richter, Pierre Boulez, Charles Mackerras, Colin Davis, John Eliot Gardiner, Yan Pascal Tortelier, Mark Elder, Roger Norrington, John Lubbock and Andrew Davis. Simon Wright is the Conductor and Artistic Adviser.

New music has often been commissioned or championed by the Chorus: works written for the chorus and conducted in Leeds by the composer include Antonín Dvořák's St. Ludmilla, Edward Elgar's Caractacus; Vaughan Williams' A Sea Symphony, and perhaps the most famous commission was Walton's Belshazzar's Feast, first conducted by Sir Malcolm Sargent. [References - Dvorak Alec Robertson, The Master Musicians Series, Dent 1964; William Walton Behind the Facade, Susana Walton, Oxford University Press 1988]

In addition to its regular concerts in Leeds Town Hall, many of them part of the Leeds International Concert Season, in recent years the Chorus has performed in the Bridgewater Hall in Manchester, York Minster and the Royal Albert Hall in London as part of the BBC's Promenade Concerts series. The Chorus sings a varied repertoire; performances have included works by Mozart, Beethoven, J.S. Bach, Berlioz, Thomas Tallis, Mahler, Verdi, Rossini, Elgar, Schönberg, Poulenc, Hindemith, Schubert, Richard Strauss, Shostakovitch, Peter Maxwell Davies and many other composers.

A group of Chorus members waits outside Ripon Cathedral before entering for a summer concert.

Handel Messiah was performed by the first Festival Chorus in 1858, soon after the opening of the Town Hall by Queen Victoria and Prince Albert. A notice for this historic performance, from the Leeds Intelligencer, appears on the Chorus website.

== Recent performances ==
All past and future concerts can be found on the Leeds Festival Chorus website, along with details of online videos made during the 2020 Pandemic.

As part of its contribution to the commemoration of the Armistice of 1918, members of the Chorus contributed to a 'War Requiem Exhibition' of photographs in the Brodrick Exhibition Space at Leeds Town Hall, curated by Chorus bass Richard Wilcocks. This was in place until the end of January 2019. It was made up of photographs of ancestors of Leeds Festival Chorus, City of Glasgow Chorus and Cantabile Choir who took part in various capacities in the First World War, together with photographs of staff and patients at Leeds's main war hospital at Beckett Park (2nd Northern General Hospital) were on display, with stories and explanations to accompany them. The three choirs, accompanied by the BBC Philharmonic, all performed in Benjamin Britten War Requiem at Leeds Town Hall on 17 November 2018.

Because Leeds Town Hall is being extensively refurbished, many current performances take place at St Edmund's, Roundhay, north Leeds.

== International ==
The Chorus has its own language coaches for performances in German, Russian and Italian.

The Chorus gave three concerts in Venice in August 2013. These engagements came about after an invitation was received from the concert pianist Alessandro Taverna, who performed at the Leeds International Pianoforte Competition in 2009 (3rd prize), and who is a native of Caorle, near Venice. The concerts took place in Saint Stephen's Cathedral in Caorle, and in St Mark's Basilica and Chiesa dei Gesuati in Venice. The Chorus gave concerts in Poland in August 2016 - in St Katherine's Church, Kraków, Kościół św. Krzyża (Church of the Holy Cross), Wrocław and Opole Cathedral as part of the BelleVoci International Music Festival. It also sang informally three hundred feet underground in the Warszawa Gallery of the Wieliczka Salt Mine near Kraków. In May 2024, the Chorus toured Spain, performing to capacity audiences in the Cathedrals of Burgos, Valladolid and Salamanca. The programme included 'Two Catalan Songs' by Chorus patron Roderick Williams which had been premiered in Leeds earlier in the year.

== Involvement with young people ==
The Chorus supports Leeds Youth Singers in association with Leeds Artforms. Leeds Youth Choir welcomes young singers, male and female, aged 11+, to a group of about thirty singers. The choir sings a wide range of music, from popular songs and musicals to classical works, and takes part in three or more concerts each year in Leeds and Yorkshire. Support for Leeds Youth Choir is part of the Chorus's policy of encouraging young people to take more interest in classical music.

== Recordings ==
Recordings on CD for Chandos Records and Naxos Records include Berlioz' Symphonie Funèbre et Triomphale, Constant Lambert Summer's Last Will and Testament, Hindemith Sancta Susanna and George Enescu Third Symphony. In 1966 members of the Chorus travelled to London to contribute to a professionally recorded performance of Mahler Symphony No.8 – the Symphony of a Thousand, conducted by Leonard Bernstein. This took place in the capacious Walthamstow Assembly Hall in what is now Waltham Forest Town Hall. The concert followed a previous performance at the Royal Albert Hall which was televised. The Walthamstow concert is available as part of a CD box set (Columbia Masterworks – S2BR220317). Full details of what is currently available can be found on the Chorus's website.
