= Huddersfield Choral Society =

Choir from West Yorkshire, England

- Origin: Huddersfield, West Yorkshire, England
- Genres: Classical choral music
- Years active: 1836–present
- Label: Signum Records
- Website: www.huddersfieldchoral.com

Huddersfield Choral Society is a choir based in Huddersfield, West Yorkshire, England. It was founded in 1836, and is recognised as one of Britain's leading choirs. Over the years, the choir has performed most of the major works in the choral repertoire, and has had numerous works commissioned for it, including works by Ralph Vaughan Williams and William Walton. The choir has made numerous recordings and broadcasts. Three of its albums made an appearance in the UK Albums Chart. These were Elgar The Dream of Gerontius (2026, #2) The Hymns Album (1986, #8) and The Carols Album (1986, #29).

Members of the Huddersfield Choral Society have drawn parallels between the 2025 film The Choral and their ensemble, as the plot of the film revolves around a 1916 performance of Edward Elgar's The Dream of Gerontius, which the Society had also programmed during the First World War, to be conducted by Elgar himself.

== Discography ==
Year of recording	Work / Album	Artists	Record label
1946	Messiah, G.F.Handel	Liverpool Philharmonic Orchestra, Malcolm Sargent (conductor)	Columbia
1954	Messiah, G.F.Handel	Liverpool Philharmonic Orchestra, Sir Malcolm Sargent (conductor)	Columbia
1959	Messiah, G.F.Handel	Royal Liverpool Philharmonic Orchestra, Sir Malcolm Sargent (conductor)	HMV
1986	The Hymns Album	Owain Arwel Hughes (conductor)	EMI
1986	The Carols Album	Owain Arwel Hughes (conductor)	EMI
1993	A Christmas Celebration	Sellers Engineering Band, Brian Kay (conductor)	Chandos Brass
1994	The Wreckers (world premiere recording)	BBC Philharmonic, Odaline de la Martinez (conductor)	Conifer Records Limited
2000	A Christmas Fantasy	Black Dyke Mills Band, John Foster (conductor)	Chandos Brass
2002	Symphony No. 3 'The Muses', Cyril Scott	BBC Philharmonic, Martyn Brabbins (conductor)	Chandos
2003	Works for Chorus and Orchestra, Sir Arnold Bax	BBC Philharmonic, Martyn Brabbins (conductor)	Chandos
2006	Messiah, G.F.Handel arr. W.A.Mozart	Royal Philharmonic Orchestra, Sir Charles Mackerras (conductor)	Signum Classics
2006	The Hymns Album	Darius Battiwalla (organ), Joseph Cullen (conductor)	Signum Classics
2007	The Carols Album	Darius Battiwalla (organ), Joseph Cullen (conductor)	Signum Classics
2009	The Crucifixion, Stainer	Darius Battiwalla (organ), Joseph Cullen (conductor)	Signum Classics
2010	Messiah, G.F.Handel	Northern Sinfonia, Jane Glover (conductor)	Signum Classics
2016	Anthem: Great British Hymns & Choral Works	Thomas Trotter (organ), Aidan Oliver (conductor)	Signum Classics
2019	Caractacus, Sir E. Elgar	Orchestra of Opera North, Martyn Brabbins (conductor),	Hyperion Records
2026	The Dream of Gerontius, Sir E. Elgar	Orchestra of Opera North, Martyn Brabbins (conductor), RNCM (choir)	Hyperion Records
