= Miriam Licette =

English operatic soprano

Miriam Licette in 1920

Miriam Licette (9 September 1885 – 11 August 1969) was an English operatic soprano whose career spanned 35 years, from the mid-1910s to after World War II. She was also a singing teacher, and created the Miriam Licette Scholarship.

== Career ==
She was born as Miriam Lycett in the village of Over, Cheshire in 1885. (Her cousin was the champion tennis player Randolph Lycett.) She spent some of her early years in places like Hong Kong and Singapore, as her father was a captain with the Blue Star Shipping Line.

She studied singing at Lowther College in Lytham. She was first noticed by Dame Nellie Melba, who advised her to go to Paris for further study with her own teacher, Mathilde Marchesi. She also studied with Melba herself, Jean de Reszke, and in Milan with Vincenzo Sabbatini. She made her debut in Rome on 7 November 1911, as Myriam Licette, in the title role of Madama Butterfly.

Her first appearance as Miriam Licette was in London in 1912, at the Kennington Theatre, with the Royal Carl Rosa Opera. That year she married George Edward Webster Robinson, an opera singer. Her roles at this time included Marguerite in Gounod's Faust, Micaela in Bizet's Carmen, and Pamina in Mozart's The Magic Flute.

On 16 June 1913 she gave birth to her only child, a boy named Maurice Robinson. In May 1915, Sir Thomas Beecham heard her for the first time, in La traviata, and immediately signed her for a Proms Concert two weeks later, to sing Tatiana's Letter Scene from Tchaikovsky's Eugene Onegin. She became Beecham's favourite singer with his Beecham Opera Company. He signed her to sing Juliet in Gounod's Roméo et Juliette in October, and she also appeared in concert singing operatic arias such as "Ritorna vincitor!" from Verdi's Aida. Licette sang at the Proms at least six more times during her career.

On 28 December, Licette appeared as "Good Deeds" in the premiere of Liza Lehmann's opera Everyman. (Liza Lehmann's grandson Steuart Bedford played the organ at Licette's memorial service in 1969.) She was heard as Antonia in Offenbach's The Tales of Hoffmann and Pamina in The Magic Flute. On 14 October 1916, she appeared in a concert of Russian and French music in Manchester, at which the flautist V. L. Needham collapsed and died.

The year 1917 saw Licette in Charpentier's Louise, and on 4 May as Catherine Glover in the UK premiere of Bizet's The Fair Maid of Perth. In July she sang Countess Almaviva in Mozart's The Marriage of Figaro, and in November came her first Constanze in Die Entführung aus dem Serail. In June 1918 she sang Sieglinde in Wagner's Die Walküre under Beecham.

She sang at Covent Garden from 1919 to 1929. In May 1919 she received thirteen curtain calls after the Garden Scene in Faust. She had a similar triumph when she sang this role in Scotland. She also appeared as Mimi in ten performances of Puccini's La bohème. On 26 July, she created the role of Princess Yaroslavna in the first performance in English of Borodin's Prince Igor. In February 1920 she was Eva in The Mastersingers of Nuremberg, and in April she appeared in a revival of Delius's A Village Romeo and Juliet.

At this time, the Beecham Opera Company foundered due to financial problems. She sang Mimi in La bohème at Covent Garden in June 1920, with the composer in attendance. That year, she appeared as Euridice with Dame Clara Butt in the latter singer's only appearance in grand opera, Gluck's Orfeo ed Euridice (sung in French).

In 1922 she joined the British National Opera Company. Later that year, her divorce from her estranged husband was finalised. In 1924 she added the female title role in Debussy's Pelléas et Mélisande to her repertoire. She also appeared in Holst's Savitri, and in a Royal Choral Society concert presentation of Berlioz's The Damnation of Faust under Sir Hamilton Harty. She also appeared in 1925 in what would become an annual tradition for the next 15 years – a staging with scenery and costumes of Samuel Coleridge-Taylor's The Song of Hiawatha, initially with the RCS under Eugene Goossens. The singers in these performances also included Lilian Stiles-Allen, Elsie Suddaby, Harold Williams, Parry Jones and Frank Titterton.

In 1929 she appeared in a performance of Delius's A Mass of Life with Astra Desmond, Tudor Davies and Roy Henderson with Sir Thomas Beecham leading the BBC Symphony Orchestra. She had also sung in this work in 1925, with Walter Widdop, under the conductor Paul von Klenau.

On 19 September 1931, her son Maurice died from a streptococcal infection, aged only 18. The following month she sang the Marschallin in Richard Strauss's Der Rosenkavalier, with Norman Allin, under John Barbirolli. In 1935 she appeared in the British premiere of Hindemith's opera Cardillac. In 1944, as part of an ENSA group, she entertained British troops stationed in the Middle East when aged almost 60.

Mirima Licette retired to teach singing. She died on 11 August 1969, at the Royal Berks Hospital in Reading, Berkshire, aged 83. The bulk of her estate was used to found the Miriam Licette Scholarship, which is administered by the Musicians' Benevolent Fund, awardees being permitted to study anywhere in France, with particular emphasis on the interpretation of French mélodie.

== Recordings ==
Her recordings include a complete Faust under Sir Thomas Beecham (1930); substantial extracts from William Vincent Wallace's Maritana; and Santuzza in Cavalleria rusticana and Nedda in Pagliacci. A complete discography has been prepared.

Her associate artists in these recordings include Dennis Noble, Heddle Nash, Muriel Brunskill, Harold Williams, Frank Mullings and Clara Serena; and the conductors Sir Thomas Beecham, Percy Pitt, Albert Ketèlbey, Hamilton Harty, Hubert Bath, Felix Weingartner, Eugene Goossens, Clarence Raybould and Stanford Robinson.

She was one of the soloists on the first electrical recording of Beethoven's 9th symphony with the London Symphony Orchestra conducted by Felix Weingartner in march 1926. (Columbia Masterworks Set No. 39)

== Principal roles ==
Miriam Licette's principal roles were:

- Charpentier: title role in Louise
- Gounod: Marguerite in Faust
- Gounod: Juliette in Roméo et Juliette
- Mozart: Pamina in The Magic Flute
- Mozart: Donna Anna in Don Giovanni
- Mozart: Countess Almaviva in The Marriage of Figaro
- Offenbach: principal soprano in The Tales of Hoffmann
- Puccini: Cio-Cio San in Madama Butterfly
- Puccini: Mimi in La bohème
- Verdi: Desdemona in Otello
- Wagner: Eva in The Mastersingers of Nuremberg.
