= Muriel Brunskill =

English contralto (1899–1980)

Muriel Lucy Brunskill
- Born: 18 December 1899; Kendal, Westmorland, England
- Died: 18 February 1980 (aged 80); Barnstaple, Devon, England
- Occupation: Contralto
- Years active: 1920–1949
- Spouse: Robert Ainsworth (m. 1925; died 1947)
- Children: 2

Muriel Lucy Brunskill (18 December 1899 – 18 February 1980) was an English contralto of the mid-twentieth century. Her career included concert, operatic and recital performance from the early 1920s until the 1950s. She worked with many of the leading musicians of her day, including Sir Thomas Beecham, Albert Coates, Felix Weingartner and Sir Henry Wood.

== Early years ==
Muriel Brunskill was born in Kendal, Westmorland, England, daughter of Edmund Capstick Brunskill. She studied singing in London and Paris with Blanche Marchesi. Her début was in 1920 at the Aeolian Hall, London. She sang at the Proms in 1921 in Elgar's Sea Pictures, when The Times commented that her singing was intelligent but lacked bite, and her diction was indistinct. By 1923, Brunskill's critical reputation was much higher: The Musical Times said, "She is clearly one of the elect as a Bach singer."

In 1922, Brunskill was recruited by the British National Opera Company where her roles included Amneris in Aida, Delilah in Samson and Delilah, Erda in the Ring and Emilia in Otello She remained with the company for six years, performing at Covent Garden, His Majesty's Theatre and on tour.

Her appearances for the Royal Philharmonic Society began in October 1925 at the Queen's Hall in a choral programme including Beethoven's Ninth Symphony under Albert Coates, with Dorothy Silk, Walter Widdop and Robert Radford. In March 1927 she performed the Missa Solemnis in the RPS Beethoven memorial concert at the Royal Albert Hall, under Sir Hugh Allen, with Rosina Buckman, Parry Jones and Norman Allin.

In 1925, Brunskill married the conductor Robert Ainsworth, with whom she had two sons. Ainsworth died in 1947, aged 46.

== Peak years ==
After leaving the BNOC in 1927, Brunskill sang mostly in oratorio and other concert works, appearing regularly at the Three Choirs, Handel, Norwich, and Leeds Festivals, and with the Royal Choral Society, Royal Philharmonic Society, Liverpool Philharmonic Orchestra and Hallé Orchestra.

To celebrate Elgar's 70th birthday in 1927, the BBC broadcast a birthday concert from No 1 Studio, Savoy Hill. Elgar conducted, and Brunskill sang in The Music Makers and Sea Pictures. Overseas, Brunskill sang with the Toronto Symphony Orchestra and on a Canadian tour in 1930; at the Cincinnati May Festival in 1931; and with the Chicago Symphony Orchestra and in New York in 1932. She returned to opera for seasons in Melbourne and Sydney, Australia, in 1934–1935 followed by a concert tour in Australia and New Zealand, with her husband.

In December 1928, Brunskill was in Beecham's Queen's Hall RPS presentation of Handel's Hercules with Dora Labbette, Lilian Stiles-Allen, Tudor Davies and Horace Stevens. Brunskill's operatic appearances were fewer in the 1930s, but in 1933 her Amneris at Covent Garden, conducted by John Barbirolli, won warm praise: "Miss Brunskill seemed to rejoice in having the Covent Garden stage as a sounding-board for her magnificent voice, and to find inspiration in the unaccustomed freedom of dramatic music. Her acting was a direct and unexaggerated expression of emotion... she achieved a fine piece of work in the part and her actual singing was superb throughout."

In 1936, Brunskill appeared as Kundry alongside Herbert Heyner, Norman Walker and Victor Harding in a presentation of Parsifal for the BBC under Sir Henry Wood. In 1938 she appeared in the English première of Paul Hindemith's Mathis der Maler

On 5 October 1938, in celebration of Sir Henry Wood's golden jubilee as a conductor, Brunskill sang in the first performance of Ralph Vaughan Williams's Serenade to Music along with fifteen other leading English singers including another Marchesi pupil, Astra Desmond. In the same year Brunskill sang under Wood in a rare performance of Gustav Mahler's 8th Symphony (Symphony of a Thousand). Early in Wood's autumn 1940 season at Queen's Hall, Brunskill sang Brahms's Alto Rhapsody, ("jolly well", according to Wood).

Brunskill sang the role of the Angel in The Dream of Gerontius conducted by Malcolm Sargent on 10 May 1941, the last concert given in the Queen's Hall, which was destroyed by a German incendiary bomb that night in an air raid. In 1942, to mark Arthur Sullivan's centenary week, the BBC broadcast The Golden Legend from the Royal Albert Hall, conducted by Wood with soloists including Muriel Brunskill.

== Later years ==
In 1949, Brunskill made her last operatic appearance, as Ortrud in Lohengrin at Covent Garden. In the 1950s, she extended her repertoire, appearing in the musical Golden City by John Toré, which ran at the Adelphi Theatre from June to October 1950, and in the film The Story of Gilbert and Sullivan in 1953. In 1956 and 1957, she appeared in a Gilbert and Sullivan tour in Australia and New Zealand.

Though best known for oratorio and opera, Brunskill was also admired for her song recitals. The Times said, "As a recitalist she excelled in the songs of Schubert, Brahms and those of contemporary English composers. Her voice, even throughout all registers... was capable of many and expressive nuances." In 1954, a Times critic commented that years of opera and oratorio had made her voice less suitable for the recital room. In a 2001 history of London's main recital venue, the Wigmore Hall, the critic Alan Blyth remembered Brunskill's "formidable presence with her handbag plonked on the piano lid."

Brunskill retired to Bishops Tawton, near Barnstaple, Devon, England, where she died at age eighty.

== Recordings ==
In Thomas Beecham's first recording of Messiah, in 1927, Brunskill was one of the soloists, along with Dora Labbette, Harold Williams, Hubert Eisdell, and Nellie Walker. In recordings of the same period, Brunskill was the contralto soloist in Felix Weingartner's recording of Beethoven's Ninth Symphony.

Her other recordings include Gounod's Faust, with Harold Williams, Robert Carr, and Robert Easton, conducted by Clarence Raybould; Vaughan Williams's Serenade to Music, with Lilian Stiles-Allen, Isobel Baillie, Elsie Suddaby, Eva Turner, Margaret Balfour, Astra Desmond, Mary Jarred, Parry Jones, Heddle Nash, Frank Titterton, Walter Widdop, Roy Henderson, Norman Allin, Robert Easton, Harold Williams, the Queen's Hall Orchestra, the BBC Symphony Orchestra, conducted by Sir Henry Wood; and John Toré's Golden City, original cast recording, with Edmund Purdom, Eleanor Summerfield and Emile Belcourt.

Brunskill's last recordings include a disc of Christmas music for EMI in 1955 with Isobel Baillie, Heddle Nash and Harold Williams.
