= Dennis Noble =

British singer

Dennis Noble (25 September 1898 – 14 March 1966) was a noted British baritone and teacher. He appeared in opera, oratorio, musical comedy and song, from the First World War through to the late 1950s. He was renowned for his enunciation and diction. He became the most prolific radio broadcaster of his time.

== Biography ==
He was born William Ewart Noble on 25 September 1898, in Bristol. His father's name was also William, so the younger William was known as Ewart Noble. He was trained at Bristol Cathedral's Choir School under its teacher, Dr. Hubert Hunt. He was invalided after war service in France with the Royal Bucks Hussars, but returned to the front to sing with the Fifth Army's entertainment unit, "The Gaieties". This provided him with his first stage appearance, in the opera house of Lille, in the musical Aladdin. It was around this time that he chose the professional name Dennis Noble, after seeing a Dennis lorry drive past.

In 1923 he married Marjorie Booth, a contralto. He studied singing with Dinh Gilly and Mattia Battistini. He was invited to join the choir of Westminster Abbey, and sang at the wedding of H.R.H. the Duke of York and Lady Elizabeth Bowes-Lyon in April 1923.

His voice was noticed by Percy Pitt while he was singing at a cinema, and he was invited to sing at Covent Garden, as Silvio in Pagliacci, after some very hurried lessons in stage craft from Aylmer Buesst. He then determined to one day sing Rigoletto at Covent Garden. In the meantime, he continued singing in musical comedy. In 1924 he joined Amelita Galli-Curci's tour of Britain. He added Rigoletto to his repertoire, as well as Papageno (The Magic Flute) and Prince Aphron (The Golden Cockerel).

In March 1926 he sang in Sir Edward Elgar's The Apostles in Manchester, under Sir Hamilton Harty. In April 1928 his wife died of a brain tumour, followed shortly by the death of his mother. Nevertheless, he sang in six roles at Covent Garden that season. In October, in Leeds, he sang in Delius's Sea Drift and Sir Hubert Parry's Job, under Sir Thomas Beecham. In November he recorded Sea Drift under Beecham. Then came Handel's Messiah and Verdi's Requiem.

On 25 June 1929 he created the role of Achior in Eugene Goossens's opera Judith. In October, at a special concert honouring Frederick Delius, he sang in Sea Drift and in Act III of A Village Romeo and Juliet. He also sang in A Village Romeo and Juliet in its first broadcast performance on 20 May 1932.

On 9 June 1931, he sang the elder Germont in La traviata. He received so many curtain calls after "Di Provenza" that his colleagues Rosa Ponselle and Dino Borgioli left the stage. (When he appeared on Desert Island Discs on 19 November 1956, his own recording of "Di Provenza" was one of the discs he chose.)

On 8 October came the first performance of William Walton's Belshazzar's Feast, a work he recorded twice and came to be particularly associated with (he sang in it in 1953 in a special concert commemorating the coronation of Elizabeth II). In December he married Marjorie Bain, daughter of Sir Ernest Bain.

In September 1932 he sang in The Dream of Gerontius at the Three Choirs Festival in Gloucester.

Dennis Noble had continued to sing in musicals all along, and in September 1934 he appeared with Marie Burke in 298 performances of The Great Waltz in New York, followed by a United States tour. This led to the famous film version, starring Miliza Korjus.

In March 1935 he sang in The Marriage of Figaro in Philadelphia, with Maria Kurenko, Julius Huehn, Josephine Antoine, with the Philadelphia Orchestra under Fritz Reiner.

In November 1936 he sang Sam Weller when Albert Coates's opera Pickwick became the first opera televised by the BBC.

He created the title role in Ferruccio Busoni's Doktor Faust in its first performance in England on 17 March 1937, in a concert version presented at Queen's Hall, London, conducted by Adrian Boult. On 18 April 1937 he appeared in the British premiere of Ottorino Respighi's Maria egiziaca. On 24 June 1938 he created Don José in Eugene Goossens's Don Juan de Manara, with Lawrence Tibbett, Norman Allin and others. He also sang alongside Tibbett in Aida and Tosca.

His second marriage ended in divorce, and he married for a third time, to Miriam Ferris, an actress.

On 20 October 1938 he sang in the world premiere of George Lloyd's The Serf, under Albert Coates.

In March 1939 came the British premiere of Hindemith's Mathis der Maler.

During World War II, he entertained British troops in France, alongside Gracie Fields and Sir Seymour Hicks. Back home, he was in 87 performances of Chu Chin Chow. Then he was sent to the Persian Gulf for three months with ENSA, alongside Miriam Licette, Walter Widdop, Ivor Newton and others, for more entertainment duty.

In 1943 he again appeared as Germont in La traviata, with Joan Hammond, and as Figaro in The Barber of Seville, with Heddle Nash, Norman Allin and Joan Collier. In 1945 he recorded The Dream of Gerontius under Sir Malcolm Sargent.

In 1946 came the musical 1066 and All That, with Michael Redgrave, Googie Withers and Ivor Novello.

In 1951 he had two operations for bowel cancer. From 1954 to 1959 he was professor of singing at the Guildhall School of Music and Drama in London. In 1957 his third wife died. In 1960 he married for a fourth time, to Sylvia McCormack. In the 1960s he taught singing at the Royal Irish Academy of Music in Dublin.

He died in Javea, north of Alicante, Spain, on 14 March 1966, aged 67.

== Other repertoire ==
Apart from the operas and musicals mentioned above, Dennis Noble sang in:

- Bantock's Omar Kháyyám
- Benedict's The Lily of Killarney
- Bizet's Carmen
- Borodin's Prince Igor
- Brahms's A German Requiem
- Coleridge-Taylor's The Song of Hiawatha
- Friml's The Vagabond King
- German's Merrie England
- Giordano's Andrea Chénier
- Gounod's Faust
- Mendelssohn's Elijah
- Monteverdi's Orfeo
- Offenbach's The Tales of Hoffmann
- Marcello in Puccini's La bohème
- Sharpless in Madama Butterfly
- Lescaut in Manon Lescaut
- Rossini's Petite Messe Solennelle
- Sibelius's The Origin of Fire
- Falke in Johann Strauss II's Die Fledermaus
- Sullivan's The Golden Legend
- Verdi's Falstaff and Simon Boccanegra
- Wallace's Maritana
- Wolf-Ferrari's The Secret of Susanna
- Wright and Forrest's Song of Norway.

He left an extensive discography. He appears on The Record of Singing.

== Selected filmography ==
- Spanish Eyes (1930)
