= Mary Jarred =

British opera singer (1899–1993)

Mary Jarred (9 October 1899 – 12 December 1993) was an English opera singer of the mid-twentieth century. She is sometimes classed as a mezzo-soprano and sometimes as a contralto.

== Biography ==
Jarred was born in Brotton, Yorkshire, (now in Redcar and Cleveland), and studied at the Royal College of Music.

=== Opera ===
Jarred began her career singing minor roles at Covent Garden beginning in 1929. On the recommendation of Lauritz Melchior, she was invited to the Hamburg State Opera and remained there as a guest artist for the following three years. Her roles included the Nurse in Richard Strauss's Die Frau ohne Schatten and several in contemporary works by Hans Pfitzner and Alban Berg. In 1933, she sang Orpheus in Gluck's Orpheus and Eurydice for Sadler's Wells Opera.

At Covent Garden she sang every year from 1933 until 1939, when the theatre closed at the outbreak of war. She sang Erda in Wagner's Das Rheingold and Siegfried, and Fricka in Die Walküre. In 1934, she sang Margret in the first British broadcast performance of Alban Berg's Wozzeck for the BBC, conducted by Adrian Boult. During and immediately after the Second World War, Jarred performed in recitals and concerts. She returned to opera in 1953, as the brothel keeper in the British stage première of Stravinsky's The Rake's Progress.

=== Concerts and later years ===
In concert, she was famed as contralto soloist in Handel's Messiah, J.S. Bach's St Matthew Passion, Mendelssohn's Elijah and Beethoven's Choral Symphony. She was also a well-known Angel in Elgar's The Dream of Gerontius. The Times commented: "In all these parts her commitment, sincerity and warmth of personality were abundantly evident." On 5 October 1938, she was one of the original 16 singers in Vaughan Williams's Serenade to Music.

After her retirement, she was a professor at the Royal Academy of Music from 1965 to 1973. Along with Eva Turner and Roy Henderson, Mary Jarred took part in a BBC Radio broadcast written and presented by John Steane in 1989 celebrating the 50th anniversary of the Serenade to Music.

Jarred died at the age of 94.

== Recordings ==
Jarred's recordings include the following:

- Bedřich Smetana: The Bartered Bride Marko Rothmüller (baritone), Sabine Kalter (mezzo-soprano), Stella Andreva (soprano), Heinrich Tessmer (tenor), Fritz Krenn (bass), Richard Tauber, Mary Jarred (mezzo-soprano), Arnold Matters (bass), Hilde Konetzni (soprano), London Philharmonic Orchestra, Royal Opera House Covent Garden Chorus, Sir Thomas Beecham (conductor), Somm 14
- Richard Wagner: Der Fliegende Holländer - abridged Ben Williams (tenor), Herbert Janssen (baritone), Kirsten Flagstad (soprano), Ludwig Weber (bass); Mary Jarred (contralto), Max Lorenz (tenor), Royal Opera House Chorus, Covent Garden Choir, London Philharmonic Orchestra, Fritz Reiner (conductor), Standing Room Only
- Ludwig van Beethoven: Symphony No 9: Arturo Toscanini conductor, BBC S.O., Isobel Baillie, Mary Jarred, Parry Jones, Harold Williams. Live performance, 3 November 1937, Queen's Hall, London. Music & Arts 1144
- Ludwig van Beethoven: Mass in D major, Missa solemnis, Op. 123, London Philharmonic Orchestra, Leeds Festival Chorus, Isobel Baillie soprano, Mary Jarred (contralto), Heddle Nash tenor, Keith Faulkner (bass), Sir Thomas Beecham (conductor) Somm SOMM-BEECHAM 11
- Mary Jarred, contralto; The BBC Orchestra, Section F; Clarence Raybould, conductor Elgar's Interpreters on Record, Volume 5: Broadcasts from the Leech Collection at the British Library (1935-1950) Elgar Society EECD003-005 (Sea Pictures "Sea Slumber Song" complete, "Sabbath Morning at Sea" to bar 84, "The Swimmer" bars between 74 and 107 are missing)
