= The Song of Hiawatha (Coleridge-Taylor) =

Musical work by Samuel Coleridge-Taylor

- Trilogy of cantatas by Samuel Coleridge-Taylor
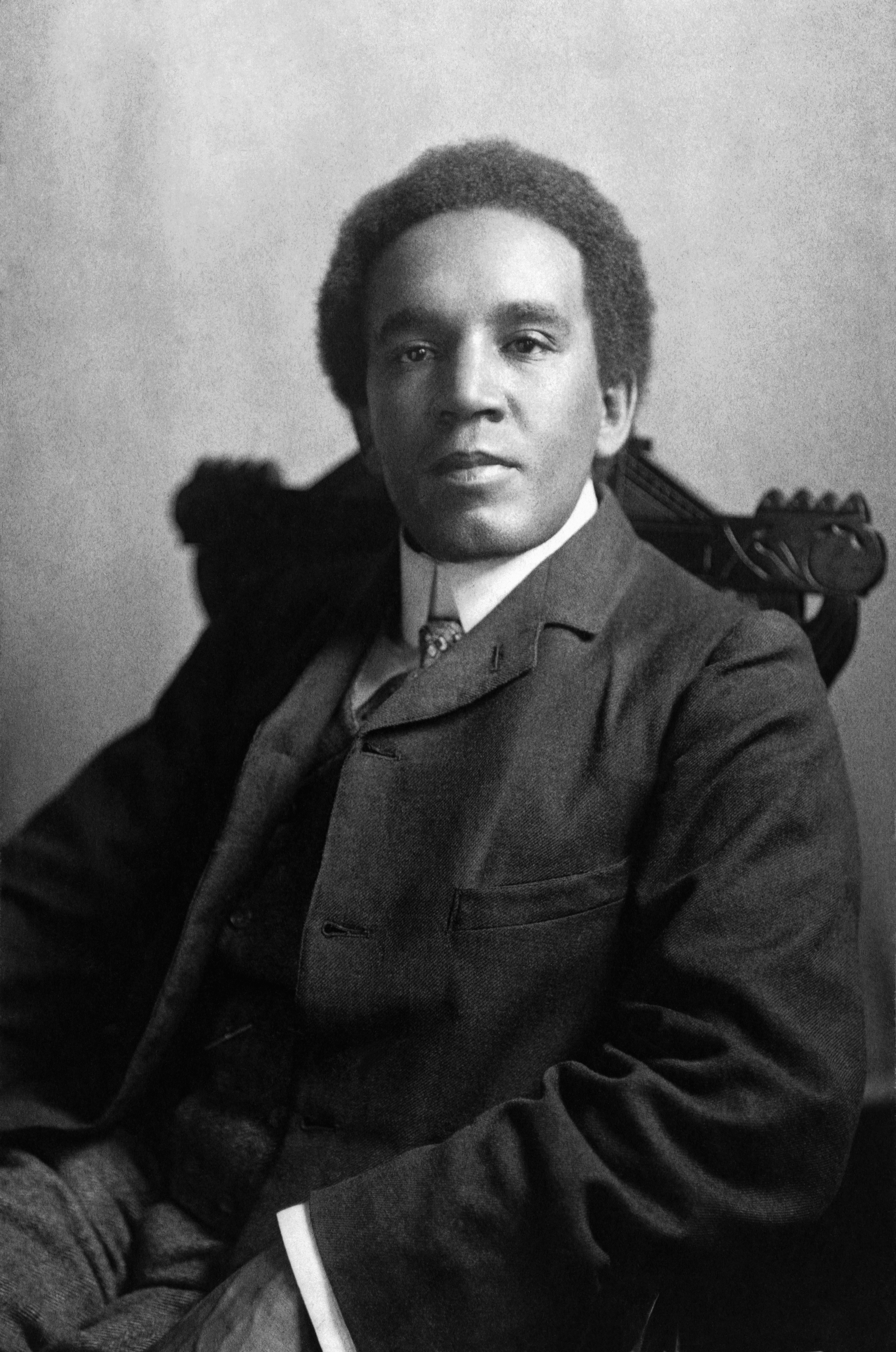
- The composer
- Opus: 30
- Language: English
- Based on: The Song of Hiawatha by Henry Wadsworth Longfellow
- Performed: 1900

The Song of Hiawatha (full name: Scenes from The Song of Hiawatha), Op. 30, is a trilogy of cantatas written by Samuel Coleridge-Taylor between 1898 and 1900. The first part, Hiawatha's Wedding Feast, was particularly famous for many years and made the composer's name known throughout the world.

== Structure ==
Hiawatha's Wedding Feast
- Performed: 8 November 1898
- Movements: nine
- Scoring: tenor; choir; orchestra

Hiawatha's Wedding Feast consists of nine sections: eight for chorus and orchestra, and one, "Onaway! Awake, beloved!", for solo tenor and orchestra.

== Background ==
In 1898, Coleridge-Taylor was fresh from his success with his orchestral Ballade in A minor, which was performed at the Three Choirs Festival of 1898 after Edward Elgar had recommended him as "far and away the cleverest fellow going amongst the younger men". Having been greatly inspired by his reading of Longfellow's epic 1855 poem The Song of Hiawatha (even later naming his own son Hiawatha), he decided to set the words to music in a choral work called Hiawatha's Wedding Feast.

The score was completed in May 1898 and was published by Novello before the first performance was given. Interest in Hiawatha's Wedding Feast was so great from sales of the music that, even before a single note of the work had been heard in public, Coleridge-Taylor was commissioned to write a sequel, The Death of Minnehaha.

The premiere of Hiawatha's Wedding Feast took place on 11 November 1898 at the Royal College of Music under the baton of his teacher, Sir Charles Villiers Stanford. (Some sources say the composer conducted the work himself; however, others make it clear that he was so shy that Stanford had to leave the stage to seek him out in order to coax him up to the stage to receive the audience's applause.) Great publicity preceded the premiere and many people were refused admission, but one person who was accommodated was Sir Arthur Sullivan, who said (according to Coleridge-Taylor's daughter Avril): "I'm always an ill man now, my boy, but I'm coming to hear your music tonight even if I have to be carried." Sullivan's high opinion of the cantata is privately confirmed by the entry he made in his diary later that night, one of the very few in which he referred at all to a contemporary composer: "Dined at home and went to Roy. Coll. Music Concert to hear Coleridge-Taylor's Hiawatha. Much impressed by the lad's genius. He is a composer, not a music-maker. The music is fresh and original - he has melody and harmony in abundance, and his scoring is brilliant and full of colour - at times luscious, rich and sensual. The work was very well done." Sir Hubert Parry described the event as "one of the most remarkable events in modern English musical history". The success of the work was immediate and international.

== The sequels ==
The Death of Minnehaha was completed in 1899 and premiered at the North Staffordshire Music Festival in Hanley on 26 October that year. A third part, Hiawatha's Departure, premiered on 22 March 1900. The whole trilogy was published as The Song of Hiawatha and had its first complete performance in 1900, at the Royal Albert Hall.

The later parts of the overall work were not nearly as successful as the first part, Hiawatha's Wedding Feast, which continued to be regarded as a work in its own right and received many hundreds of performances in the UK and overseas countries such as the US, Canada, South Africa and New Zealand. It became so famous in Britain that for many years it rivalled Handel's Messiah and Mendelssohn's Elijah in the public's affections. Nothing else he ever wrote equalled the fame of Hiawatha's Wedding Feast. The tenor aria, "Onaway! Awake, beloved!", was part of most tenors' repertoires for the next 50 years. The relative lack of success of the latter two parts was partially due to the criticisms of them by Edward Elgar and August Jaeger.

Coleridge-Taylor also wrote an overture, sometimes performed separately, which quotes the spiritual "Nobody Knows the Trouble I've Seen". In 1901, the trilogy, complete with the new overture, was presented at Birmingham, where it outshone Elgar's The Dream of Gerontius. By 1904, Hiawatha's Wedding Feast had received 200 performances in England alone.

The first performance of Hiawatha's Wedding Feast in the United States was in Brooklyn, New York, on 23 March 1899, by the Temple Choir of Brooklyn. On the strength of Hiawatha's Wedding Feast, Coleridge-Taylor made three tours of the United States, and at one stage seriously considered moving there. In 1904, he met President Theodore Roosevelt at the White House, a very unusual honour in those days for a man of African descent and appearance (his father was a native of Sierra Leone). On his 1906 tour, he conducted his works in Toronto, St. Louis, Detroit, Pittsburgh, Milwaukee, Boston, Washington and Chicago. His final tour was in 1910. His last composition, written in 1912, the year of his death, was the Hiawatha Ballet Music, Op. 82, based on The Song of Hiawatha.

Hiawatha's Wedding Feast sold hundreds of thousands of copies. Coleridge-Taylor had no conception of how successful it would become, as he had sold it outright for the sum of 15 guineas. After his death in 1912, the fact that he and his family received no royalties from what was one of the most successful and popular works written in the previous 50 years, led in part to the formation of the Performing Right Society.

== Annual stagings at the Royal Albert Hall ==
Starting in 1924, the trilogy, along with the Hiawatha Ballet Music, was presented in the Royal Albert Hall with scenery, costumes and dancing, produced by impresario T. C. Fairbairn. The first such staging was conducted on 19 May 1924 by the composer's son Hiawatha Coleridge-Taylor (who was born in 1900, at the height of the composer's fame). These stagings, often conducted by Sir Malcolm Sargent, were presented for two weeks annually until the Second World War and were attended by many thousands of people, including the Royal Family. Sargent became so associated with these "Hiawatha" performances that one chapter of one of his biographies is called "The Wigwam Years". Singers who appeared in these performances included Miriam Licette, Lilian Stiles-Allen, Elsie Suddaby, Harold Williams, Parry Jones, Frank Titterton, Tessie Mobley, William Boland, and Chief Os-Ke-Non-Ton of the Mohawk tribe.

Sargent recorded Hiawatha's Wedding Feast twice: in 1929, with tenor soloist Walter Glynne, an unnamed orchestra and the Royal Choral Society; and again in 1961, also with the Royal Choral Society, the Philharmonia Orchestra and tenor soloist Richard Lewis. Also in 1929–30, Sargent recorded The Death of Minnehaha with the same choral and orchestral forces as for the 1929 Hiawatha's Wedding Feast, with Elsie Suddaby, George Baker and Howard Fry. The work has declined in popularity of recent years, but is still sometimes revived, such as a centenary performance in Boston in October 1998. Many English Choral Society’s continue to do performances of the Songs of Hiawatha such as the Carshalton Choral Society in 2017. The Orchestre symphonique de Montréal with conductor Rafael Payare revived the work for the Edinburgh International Festival in August 2026.

== Popularity and controversy ==
As Tom Service has pointed out, performances and audiences found The Song of Hiawatha appealing because of its melodic ideas and for the directness of its choral writing. This was accessible and at the same time sufficiently challenging for the amateur choral societies, so dominant in British musical culture at the end of the nineteenth century, to tackle. The piece also has an appealing emotional clarity as it follows the arc of celebration, lamentation and farewell. Its success in Britain led to Coleridge-Taylor’s acceptance and huge popularity in the US, and from there to recognition on the world stage as a Black Composer. However, Longfellow's poem - which since its publication in 1855 had already been set many times by US composers of cantatas, operas and symphonic works - has more recently often been regarded "as a piece of colonialist caricature, mixing Indigenous stories and turning them into a parable of Hiawatha’s noble savagery". As with its predecessors, Coleridge-Taylor’s score does little to reflect indigenous musical cultures beyond surface features, and its sound world is instead "typical, and marvellous, Victoriana." (During the Albert Hall stagings Fairbairn did interpolate some Native American folk music, and also engaged the Mohawk baritone Os-Ke-Non-Ton to play ‘The Medicine Man’). In contrast, later works by Coleridge Taylor, such as his 24 Negro Melodies (1905), the Symphonic Variations on an African Air (1906) and The Bamboula (1910), were consciously built on a foundation of African music.
