= Frank Titterton =

Frank Titterton (31 December 1893, in Handsworth – 24 November 1956, in London) was a well-known British lyric tenor of the mid-twentieth century. He was noted for his musicianship.

== Biography ==
Titterton trained originally as an actor and was a member of The Pilgrim Players (which became the Birmingham Repertory Theatre) run by Sir Barry Jackson. He began to sing as an amateur, appearing in operettas by Gilbert and Sullivan and others in Birmingham before studying singing with Ernesto Beraldi and Charles Victor in London. He then left his stage career to work as a song recitalist and in Oratorio in Britain and Holland. He later became a sought-after singing teacher in London.

Titterton's career was mainly in the concert hall, though he was also a prolific broadcaster and recording artist for Vocalion, Broadcast, Columbia and Decca. Most titles were recorded under his own name, but he also used the pseudonyms 'Francesco Vada' and 'Norton Collyer'. Like many British singers of his era he spent much time touring the United Kingdom, appearing in popular oratorios, rather than performing in operas or giving lieder recitals. A Birmingham City Choir website lists some typical dates and casts for performances of Handel's Messiah, for example:

- 12 December 1936: with Lilian Stiles-Allen, Gladys Ripley, Frank Titterton, Horace Stevens; and
- 26 December 1943: with Joan Cross, Muriel Brunskill, Frank Titterton, Norman Lumsden.

Along with fellow-tenors Heddle Nash, Walter Widdop and Parry Jones, Titterton was chosen as one of the sixteen soloists for the first performance, and subsequent recording, of Vaughan Williams's Serenade to Music in 1938.

One of his pupils was John Fryatt.

In addition Titterton undertook some film roles, including parts in Barnacle Bill (1935), Song at Eventide (1934) and Waltz Time (1933).

According to the baritone Roy Henderson (BBC Radio interview 1988), Titterton always travelled with 'a sort of apothecary's case' and would produce medicines for anyone's ailments.

== Recordings ==
Titterton can be heard on record singing Michael Balfe's duet Excelsior (a setting of Longfellow's poem) with Malcolm McEachern (Pearl GEMM CD9455). He can also be heard at the following address: http://oldgramophonerecords.co.uk/titterton.htm

He was selected by the composer Alma Rattenbury, also known as 'Lozanne', to record some of her songs, recording twelve in all for Decca between 1932 and 1935, the first two to her own accompaniment. [Ref. Sir Michael Havers, et al., 'Tragedy in three voices - the Rattenbury Murder' - William Kimber, London, 1980; see also The Record Collector, Ipswich, Vol 27. 11/12, March 1983]
