= Gladys Ripley =

English contralto (1908–1955)

Gladys Ripley (9 July 1908 – 21 December 1955) was an English contralto.

== Early life ==
She was born in Forest Gate, Essex, England, the daughter of Alfred and Amy Ripley, and was educated at St. Edmund Roman Catholic School, East Ham, and at Clark's Business College.

== Career ==
In 1925, she gave her first important concert, singing Elijah at the Royal Albert Hall conducted by Albert Coates). Ripley broadcast continually from 1926 in a variety of programmes: opera, oratorio, musical plays, and light music. She sang with all the leading orchestras, under conductors including Adrian Boult, Malcolm Sargent, Thomas Beecham, Charles Thornton Lofthouse, Serge Koussevitzky, Wilhelm Furtwängler, and Victor de Sabata.

Ripley appeared with the Royal Choral Society and other principal societies. She also performed at major festivals: Three Choirs Festival, Three Valleys Festival, Norwich Festival, and Leeds Festival.

Before the Second World War, she sang for six seasons at the Royal Opera House. In 1940, she toured New Zealand as a guest artist for the New Zealand Centennial celebrations.

During the war she sang for the troops frequently, visiting France in 1940, West Africa in 1942, and Belgium and Netherlands in 1945.

In the 1942 film The Great Mr. Handel, Ripley was the singing voice of the character Mrs. Cibber, played by Elizabeth Allan.

In 1949, she toured New Zealand and Australia. In 1950, she toured the Netherlands.

== Private life ==
Ripley married three times:

1. 1928 Harry W. Gilbert giving one daughter, Shirley Anne
2. 1945 Squadron Leader John Price (died 1952)
3. Flight-Lieutenant E. A. Dick

Her recreations were swimming, gardening, knitting, and ballroom dancing. After the war, she lived in London & Pagham, Sussex.

Ripley died in Chichester of breast cancer on 21 December 1955.

== Recordings ==
Albums

Edward Elgar

- The Dream of Gerontius Heddle Nash (Gerontius), Gladys Ripley (Angel), Dennis Noble (The Priest), Norman Walker (Angel of the Agony), Huddersfield Choral Society, Liverpool Philharmonic Orchestra, Sir Malcolm Sargent Variously: Pristine PACO009, Testament - SBT 2025. (Recorded in Huddersfield Town Hall 8–12 April 1945 by His Master's Voice [matrices 2ER834-857] and originally released on 78 rpm discs C3435-46.)
- Sea Pictures Gladys Ripley, Philharmonia, George Weldon (Summer 1946). The Dream Of Gerontius and Sea Pictures Pearl GEMS 0128 (Original LPs on Capitol P-18017)

George Frideric Handel

- Messiah Sir Malcolm Sargent (conductor), Huddersfield Choral Society, Liverpool Philharmonic Orchestra, Isobel Baillie, James Johnston, Norman Walker. Dutton Laboratories 2CDEA5010 (1996). (Recorded in Huddersfield Town Hall 12–17 July & 26 September 1946 by Columbia (matrices CAX9572-9609) and originally released on 78 rpm discs DX1283-1301.)

Constant Lambert

The Rio Grande, Philharmonia Chorus, Gladys Ripley, Kyla Greenbaum, Constant Lambert (conductor) Lambert: Composer, Vol.2 Pearl

Felix Mendelssohn

- Elijah Isobel Baillie, Gladys Ripley, James Johnston, Harold Williams, Huddersfield Choral Society, Royal Liverpool Philharmonic, Malcolm Sargent. Dutton Laboratories 2CDAX2004 (2 CDs). (Recorded in Huddersfield Town Hall 29 May - 1 June 1947 by Columbia [matrices CAX9919-9950] and originally released on 78 rpm discs DX1408-1423.)

Henry Purcell

Dido and Aeneas Isobel Baillie (Belinda), Edith Coates (Sorceress), Joan Fullerton, Edna Hobson. Gladys Ripley (Second Witch), Sylvia Patriss (Spirit), Trefor Jones (Sailor), Joan Hammond (Dido), Dennis Noble (Aeneas), Constant Lambert (conductor)

Camille Saint-Saëns

Samson et Dalila Liverpool Philharmonic Orchestra, Gladys Ripley, Malcolm Sargent (conductor) Stars of English Opera, Vol.4 Dutton Laboratories

Giuseppe Verdi

Don Carlo Liverpool Philharmonic Orchestra, Malcolm Sargent (conductor). Stars of English Opera, Vol.1 Dutton Laboratories

Richard Wagner

Die Walküre Kirsten Flagstad, Rudolf Bockelmann, Maria Müller, Mae Craven, Elsa Stenning, Thelma Bardsley, Linda Seymour, Evelyn Arden, Edith Coates, Gwladys Garside, Gladys Ripley, Wilhelm Furtwängler (conductor) Wilhelm Furtwängler Conducts Excerpts from the 1937 Covent garden Performances of Die Walküre and Götterdämmerung Black Top / Wagner - Die Walküre, Act 3 Grammofono / Wagner: Die Walküre, Act 3 Myto

Singles

- "Only A Rose", Sterno 573 (from The Vagabond King, 1925)
- "Dream Lover", Sterno 381 (from The Love Parade, 1929)

== Books ==
- Brook, Donald, Singers of Today (Rockcliff, London, 1949) — pen portraits of various singers, including Ripley (She is not in the revised (1958) edition).
