= Astra Desmond =

British singer (1893–1973)

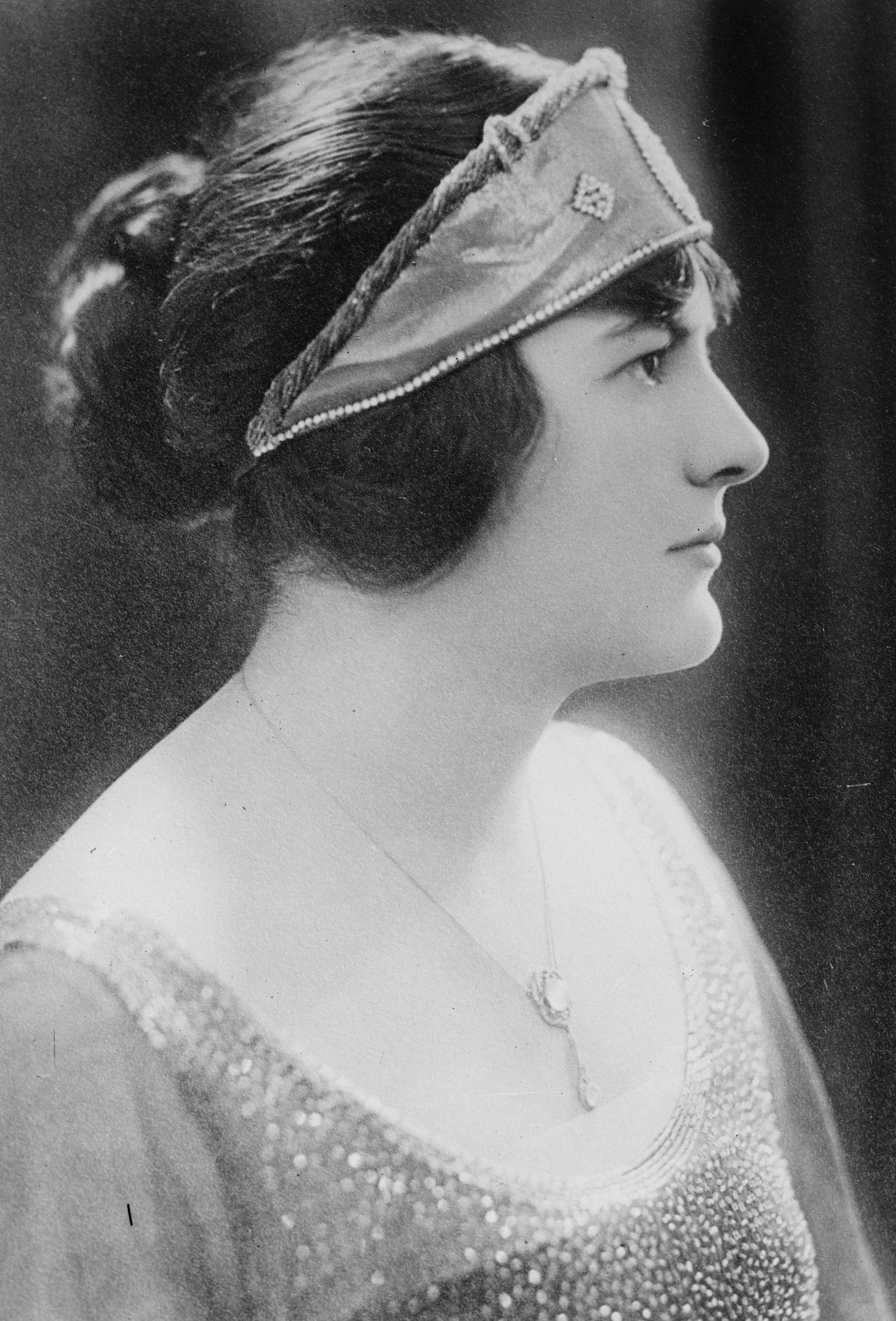
Astra Desmond

Astra Desmond CBE (10 April 1893 – 16 August 1973) was a British contralto of the early and middle twentieth century.

== Biography ==
=== Early years ===
Astra Desmond was born Gwendoline Mary Thomson (she would later modify the spelling of her first name to Gwendolyn), in Torquay, England, the daughter of George Thomson, a Melbourne-born Australian dentist, and Viva Louisa (nee Blain), a London-born British schoolteacher and suffragist. Prior to Desmond's birth the family had lived in Australia, her two older siblings Mabel and Claude being born in Melbourne. During Desmond's childhood the family moved first to Upper Norwood and then to West Kensington, both in what is now the Greater London Area. She was educated at Notting Hill High School and Westfield College, where she was a classical scholar and received a BA. She studied singing with Blanche Marchesi (as did her colleague Muriel Brunskill) and Louise Trenton, and in Berlin with Ernst Grezebach and Coenraad V. Bos.

=== Singing career ===
Desmond's career was mostly in concert and recital, but she made some operatic appearances. A 1916 review of the Carl Rosa Opera Company described her as a new singer of great promise. At Sadler's Wells she sang Delilah and Carmen and at Covent Garden, Ortrud, and Fricka.

In recital, Desmond was noted for her performances of songs by Edvard Grieg about which she wrote a 25-page article in Music and Letters in 1941, reprinted in Grieg. A Symposium, ed. Gerald Abraham. She also made a number of singing translations of Grieg's songs, published by Augener. For her work in this field she was awarded the Order of St. Olav by the Norwegian government. Her interpretation of Jean Sibelius's songs was also admired.

On 5 October 1938 Desmond was one of the original 16 singers in Ralph Vaughan Williams's Serenade to Music, the recording of which, made at EMI's Abbey Road studio shortly thereafter, has been transferred to compact disc by several companies. Earlier, in 1932, Vaughan Williams had dedicated to her his Magnificat (for contralto solo, women's choir, solo flute and orchestra). (Later, she received the contrasting tribute of having a variety of rose named after her.)

As well as the regular standard concert works including Elgar's The Dream of Gerontius (in which she frequently sang under the baton of the composer) and Handel's Messiah, Desmond sang a wide repertoire, taking part in the first broadcast performance of Stravinsky's Oedipus rex in 1928 and a rare performance of Mahler's Das Lied von der Erde, with Peter Pears, the London Philharmonic Orchestra and Sir Adrian Boult in 1942, and she was the first to introduce the songs of Yrjö Kilpinen to British audiences.

=== Recordings ===
Desmond made few commercial recordings: they include the first recording of Serenade to Music, under the baton of Henry Wood, and a series of recordings for Decca of Schumann's Frauenliebe und -leben and of songs by Purcell and Grieg; she can be also briefly heard singing with Elsie Suddaby and Isobel Baillie in "To Heart Ceasing", recorded by EMI live from a Royal Command Performance in the 1930s.

There also exist several 'off-air' recordings (home recordings from radio broadcasts) of Desmond. These include substantial excerpts of her "calm and serene" interpretation of the Angel in The Dream of Gerontius (a 1935 performance in Manchester under Malcolm Sargent, also featuring Heddle Nash), and a performance of Serenade to Music in the Royal Festival Hall, 1951, under the composer.

=== Later career ===
Like many singers Desmond took up teaching later in her career (becoming Professor of Singing at the Royal Academy of Music) from 1947 to 1963. but also wrote educational books on music, including one for the BBC Music Guides on Schumann's Lieder which is still (2007) in print.

Desmond succeeded Liza Lehmann, Cécile Chaminade, Fanny Davies, Rosa Newmarch and Myra Hess as president of the Society of Women Musicians in the UK, and also president of the Incorporated Society of Musicians.

=== Family ===
In 1920, Desmond married Sir Thomas Neame (23 December 1885 - 28 August 1973), son of Frederick and Kathleen Neame of Faversham, Kent; Sir Thomas was a brother of Sir Philip Neame. They had three sons – Basil, Geoffrey and Christopher. She was appointed a Commander of the Order of the British Empire (CBE) in 1949.

Desmond died 16 August 1973 at the age of eighty in Faversham, Kent. Her widower died less than two weeks later, on 28 August 1973.
