= Walter Widdop =

English operatic tenor

Walter Widdop

Walter Widdop (19 April 1892 – 6 September 1949) was a British operatic tenor who is best remembered for his Wagnerian performances. His repertoire also encompassed works by Verdi, Leoncavallo, Handel and Bach.

== Career ==
Widdop was born at Norland, near Halifax, Yorkshire, England. As a teenager, he worked in a woollen mill and sang in a church choir. He also won a number of singing prizes in his native county, earning praise for his "God-given" voice, which was honed by a local teacher, Arthur Hinchcliffe. He served with the British Army during World War One and married in 1917.

In 1923, Widdop made the first of many broadcasts for the BBC. In the same year, he made his professional operatic debut as Radames in Verdi's Aida with the British National Opera Company, in Leeds. He made his London debut the following year, in the title role in Wagner's Siegfried at the Royal Opera House, Covent Garden. His identification with the Wagnerian repertoire was strengthened by his recordings, notably his Siegmund in the first His Master's Voice 78-rpm album of highlights from Die Walküre, with the bass-baritone Friedrich Schorr also in the cast, under the baton of Albert Coates. His Covent Garden Siegmund was heard in 1932, and his Tristan in 1933, 1937, and 1938. His stage and studio partners included the dramatic soprani Florence Austral, Eva Turner, Frida Leider and Gota Ljungberg. Most of his recordings are available on CD reissues.

Widdop remained in demand at Covent Garden and elsewhere for his performances of taxing Heldentenor roles and the heavier Italian operatic parts. His operatic roles were not confined to the heavyweight parts. In 1928 he sang with Frida Leider in Gluck's Armide and with Stiles Allen in Handel's Rodelinda. He toured Australia and in 1936 he sang the title role in the British premiere of Stravinsky's Oedipus rex.

Widdop also appeared in oratorio and other choral music. In 1928 he sang in Handel's Solomon at a Royal Philharmonic Society performance conducted by Sir Thomas Beecham. In the same year he sang in the Verdi Requiem at the Three Choirs Festival. In 1929, with Friedrich Schorr, Elisabeth Schumann and Margaret Balfour, he took part in the first full recording of the Bach Mass in B Minor conducted by Albert Coates. In 1932 he sang in Elgar's The Kingdom, under Adrian Boult. Among his recordings of extracts from oratorio are examples of the declamatory 'set-pieces' such as "Sound an Alarm" (from Judas Maccabaeus) and "Love sounds the alarm" and "Love in her eyes sits playing" (Acis and Galatea). He also recorded gentler numbers such as "Waft her, angels" (Jephtha). Many of his recordings have been transferred to compact disc. John Steane in Grove writes, "He brought an able technique as well as an ample voice to such music as 'Sound an alarm.' ... Records made around 1930 show a firm resonant voice and a virile style, confirming his place among the best heroic tenors of the century."

In 1938, Widdop was one of the four tenor soloists chosen to perform Ralph Vaughan Williams's Serenade to Music, which had been written to celebrate Sir Henry Wood's silver jubilee as a conductor. In the solo lines written for them, Heddle Nash and Frank Titterton, with their lighter tenor voices, preceded Widdop (his solo line was "Still quiring to the young-eyed cherubins"), with the plaintive tones of Parry Jones concluding the section. Widdop sang in Spain, the Netherlands and Germany. He toured Australia in 1935, but never appeared in the United States. During World War Two, he toured South Africa, Canada and the Middle East for ENSA. He resumed his stage and concert career after the war and in 1949 performed the title role in Wagner's Parsifal, conducted by Sir Adrian Boult, at the Royal Albert Hall in London.

He sang less in his later years, but he appeared at The Proms at the Albert Hall on 5 September 1949, performing "Lohengrin's Farewell". The next day, he died suddenly in Hampstead.
