= Charles Kennedy Scott =

English organist and choral conductor

Charles K. Scott
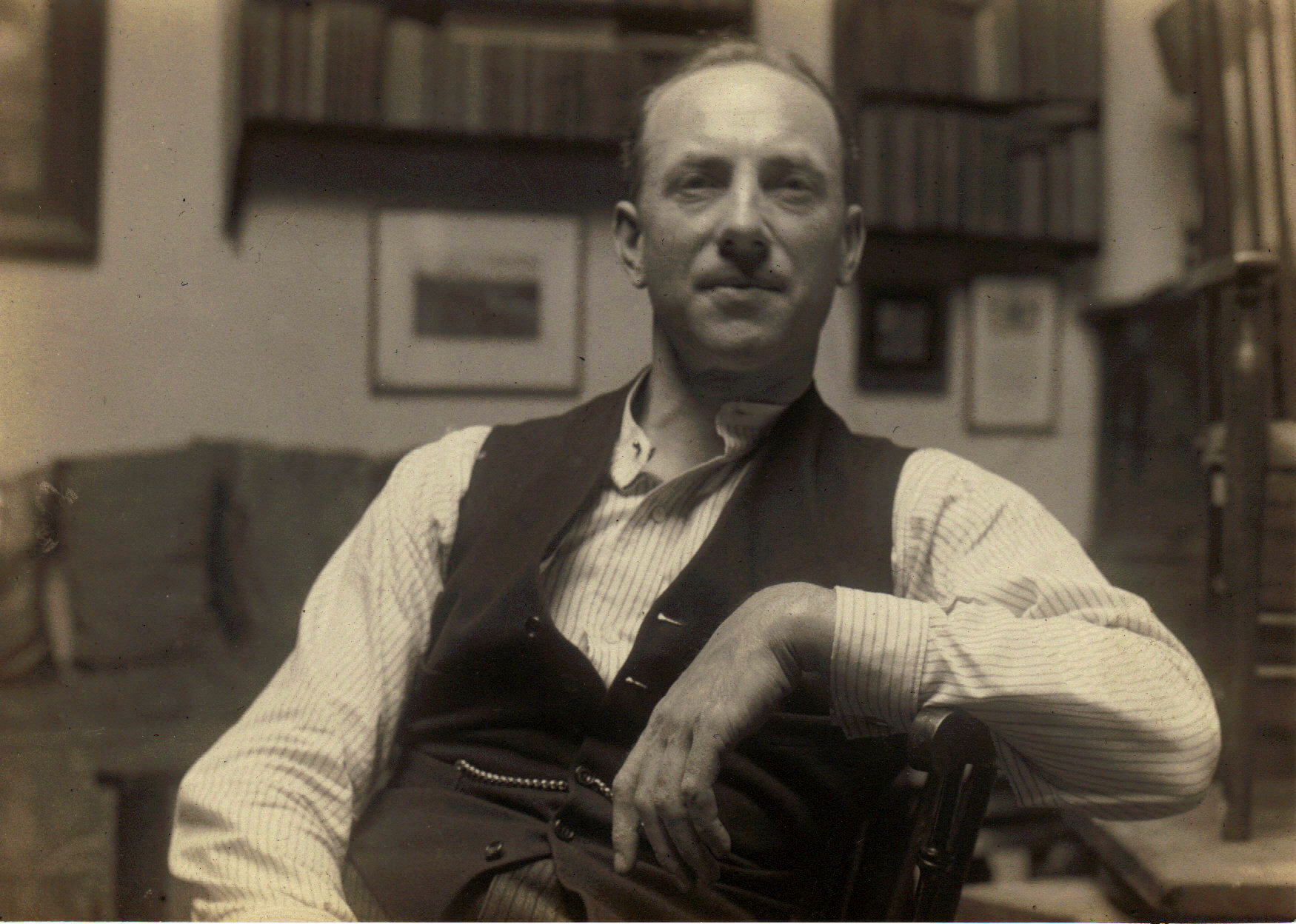
- Born: 16 November 1876; Romsey, United Kingdom
- Died: 2 July 1965 (aged 88); London, United Kingdom
- Occupations: Choral Conductor and Organist
- Known for: Major contributor in English choral music
- Notable work: The Chelsea Song Book, Giovanni Battista Pergolesi

Charles James Kennedy Osborne Scott (16 November 1876 – 2 July 1965) was an English organist and choral conductor who played an important part in developing the performance of choral and polyphonic music in England, especially of early and modern English music.

== Early career ==
Scott was born in Romsey. Educated at Southampton Grammar School, he entered the Brussels Conservatory in 1894. Beginning by studying the violin, he transferred to the organ under the outstanding virtuoso and teacher Alphonse Mailly, who encouraged a special interest in plainchant and in the phrasing of Johann Sebastian Bach's organ music: he also studied composition under Hubert Ferdinand Kufferath (1818–1896) (a pupil of Mendelssohn's), teacher of counterpoint and fugue, and under the organist-composer Edgar Tinel (1854–1912). In 1897 he took the Premier Prix avec distinction and the Mailly Prize for organ playing.

He settled in London in 1898 as a professional organist and teacher, and married a second cousin who had also studied at Brussels.

== Oriana Choir ==
In 1904 Scott founded the Oriana Madrigal Society, consisting of 36 voices, which made its first public appearance at the Portman Rooms in July 1905. Its initially stated object was 'to press the claims of our Elizabethan school', and 'to devote itself solely to the singing of English madrigals.' Scott was by chance shown the publications of the Musical Antiquarian Society, including a volume of madrigals by John Wilbye, and formed the determination to lift English Elizabethan music from its position of comparative neglect. He scored many examples over the next years and held gatherings which became the core of his society. Later on the number of voices was increased to 60, and its work was extended to include modern compositions, both English and foreign, but always with emphasis on the English.

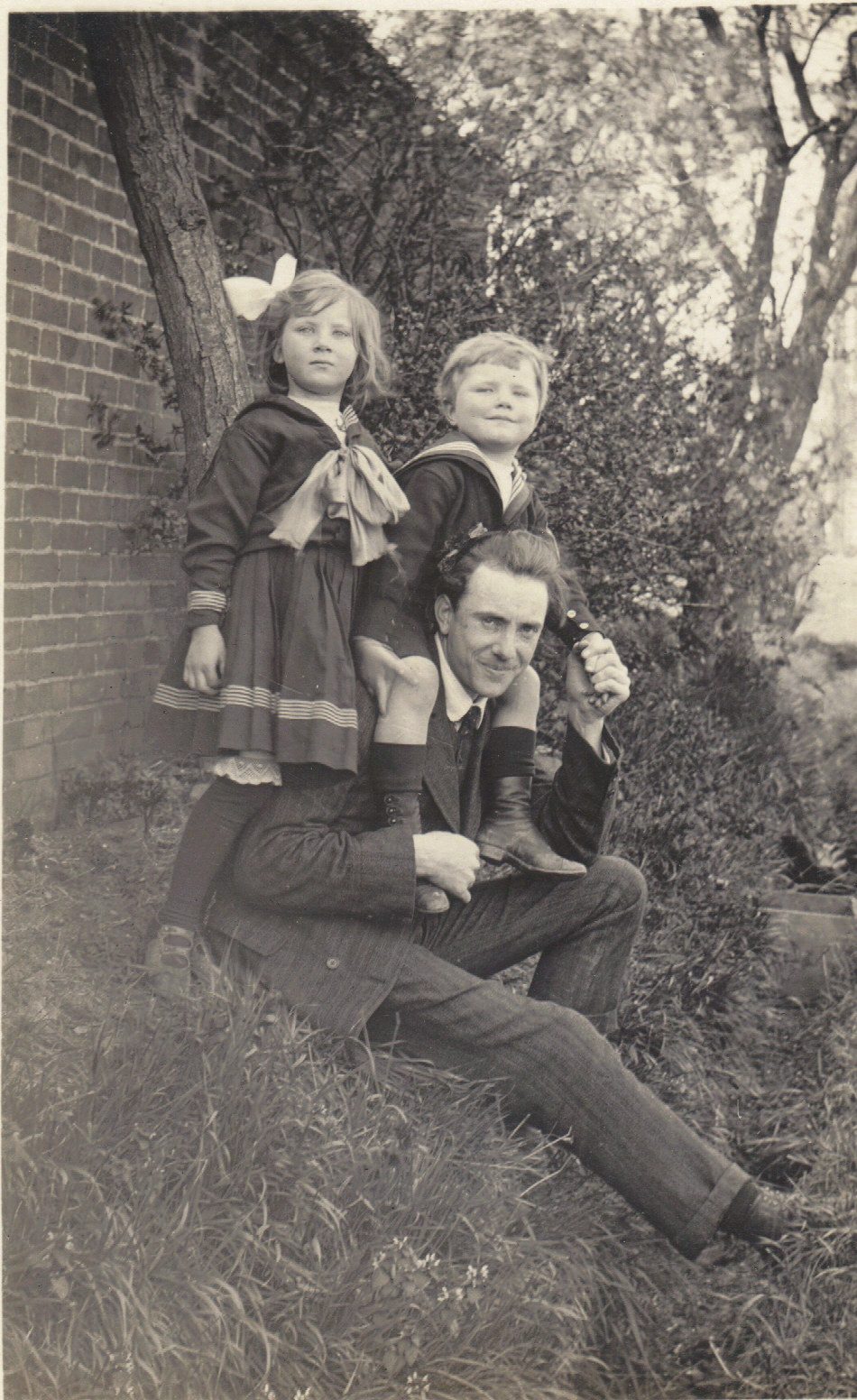
Charles Kennedy Scott with his daughter Barbara and son C. W. A. Scott in 1908.

The Oriana Choir brought high standards of precision and flexibility to choral performance, which had a beneficial influence on choral music in general. Their work naturally drew Scott towards the contemporary English scene, and he came to know H. Balfour Gardiner and Arnold Bax, and through them Norman O'Neill, Frederick Delius, Gustav Holst, Percy Grainger, Benjamin Dale, Roger Quilter and others.

Thus the Oriana gave madrigal concerts in the two series devoted to English contemporary music, of 1912 and 1913, promoted by Gardiner, and in the Philharmonic Society concert of 20 November 1913, under Scott and Balfour Gardiner, which also included part-songs by Charles Villiers Stanford, Gardiner and Hubert Parry. In 1920 they gave the first hearing of Delius's unaccompanied choruses To be Sung of a Summer Night on the Water. In 1922 they sang in a special concert of the works of Arnold Bax, with the Goossens Orchestra, giving the first performance of his motet for double choir Mater ora filium, a work dedicated to Charles Kennedy Scott.

In 1926 and 1927 the Oriana joined with the Bach Cantata Club for performances of Bach's Mass in B minor: in 1931 they sang works by Bax, Peter Warlock and Holst at a Festival for the International Society of Contemporary Music, and in 1936 they formed the core of a 100-voice chorus for the first London performance of Gabriel Fauré's Requiem, and for Heinrich Schütz's History of the Resurrection under Nadia Boulanger. All of these performances were given at the Queen's Hall, but latterly most Oriana concerts were at the Aeolian Hall, usually three times yearly, and often in collaboration with the English Folk Dance Society.

=== Recordings ===
- Delius, arr. Percy Grainger: Brigg Fair: Norman Stone (tenor), Oriana Madrigal Society directed by Charles Kennedy Scott (Dutton CD AX 8006)

== West London Ethical Society ==
Scott was involved in the Ethical movement and in 1911 became the musical director of Stanton Coit’s Ethical Church which would later become the British Humanist Association. In 1913 he produced ‘volume two’ of Social Worship which was edited by Stanton Coit. As the live-in organist for the West London Ethical Church in Bayswater Scott remained close to Coit and was a dedicated humanist for the rest of his life. During the war years he collaborated with Cecil Sharp and Gustav Holst to form the League of Arts which aimed to bring music and theatre to people in a time of war. Later Scott moved to 13 Prince of Wales Terrace where he would stay until his death, the building then housed the Union of Ethical Societies and is still the headquarters of Humanists UK today.

== Philharmonic Choir ==
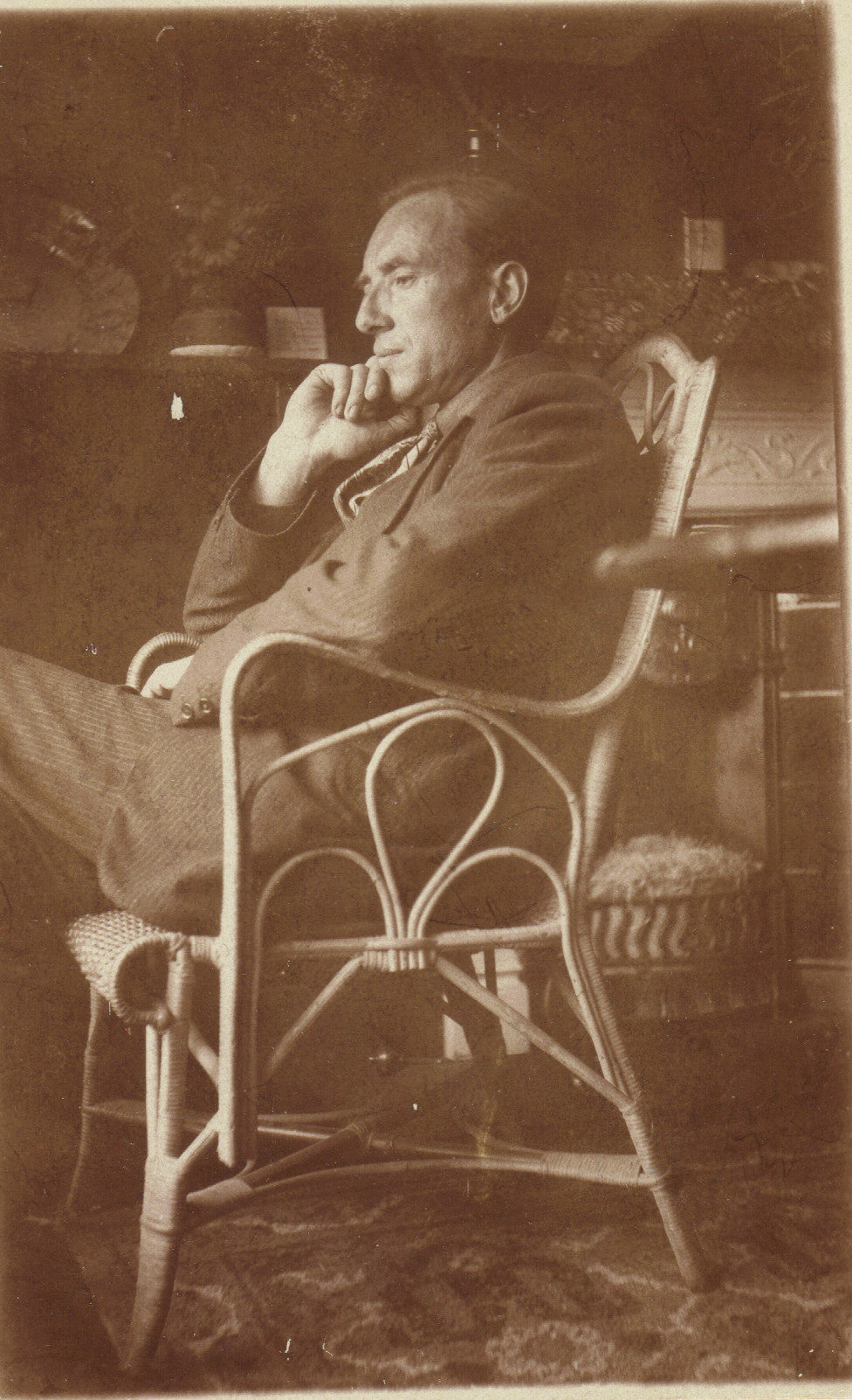
Scott in 1925

In October 1919 Scott founded the Philharmonic Choir, the predecessor of the present London Philharmonic Choir. This first appeared at a Philharmonic Society concert in February 1920, to give the first performance of Delius's A Song of the High Hills, and also Bach's Sing Ye to the Lord and Beethoven's 9th Symphony (directed by Scott, under Albert Coates). Most of its concerts took place in the Queen's Hall, where the space available limited the membership to about 300. The choir contained a large professional element, especially among the tenors, to achieve a high standard of performance: the costs of their employment were met principally by Balfour Gardiner.

The Choir gave two or three concerts of its own each season under its own conductor, but also made very numerous appearances with the Royal Philharmonic Society, the London Symphony Orchestra, the BBC, and the Courtauld-Sargent Concerts (established 1929). On 25 March 1920 they gave the first performance of Holst's The Hymn of Jesus, the composer conducting: they went on to introduce many modern works to London, including Delius's Requiem and Songs of Farewell, César Franck's Psyche: St Patrick's Breastplate, Walsinghame and This Worldes Joie by Bax; Requiem Mass by Sir George Henschel; April by Balfour Gardiner; Psalmus Hungaricus of Zoltán Kodály; San Francesco d'Assisi of Malipiero; The Prison by Ethel Smyth; The Canterbury Pilgrims and In Honour of the City by George Dyson; Ode on a Grecian Urn by Philip Napier Miles; Magnificat and Flourish for a Coronation by Ralph Vaughan Williams; Constant Lambert's Summer's Last Will and Testament, Igor Stravinsky's Oedipus Rex, Sergei Rachmaninoff's The Bells and Paul Hindemith's Mathis der Maler.

The choir was suspended in 1939 at the outbreak of World War II: when the London Philharmonic Choir was formed in 1946 Scott was unable to resume direction, and a new conductor was appointed.

The choir played a major part with the London Symphony Orchestra in Sir Thomas Beecham's 'revitalisation' of George Frideric Handel's Messiah in December 1926, and undertook much of the choral work in the Delius Festival of 1929.

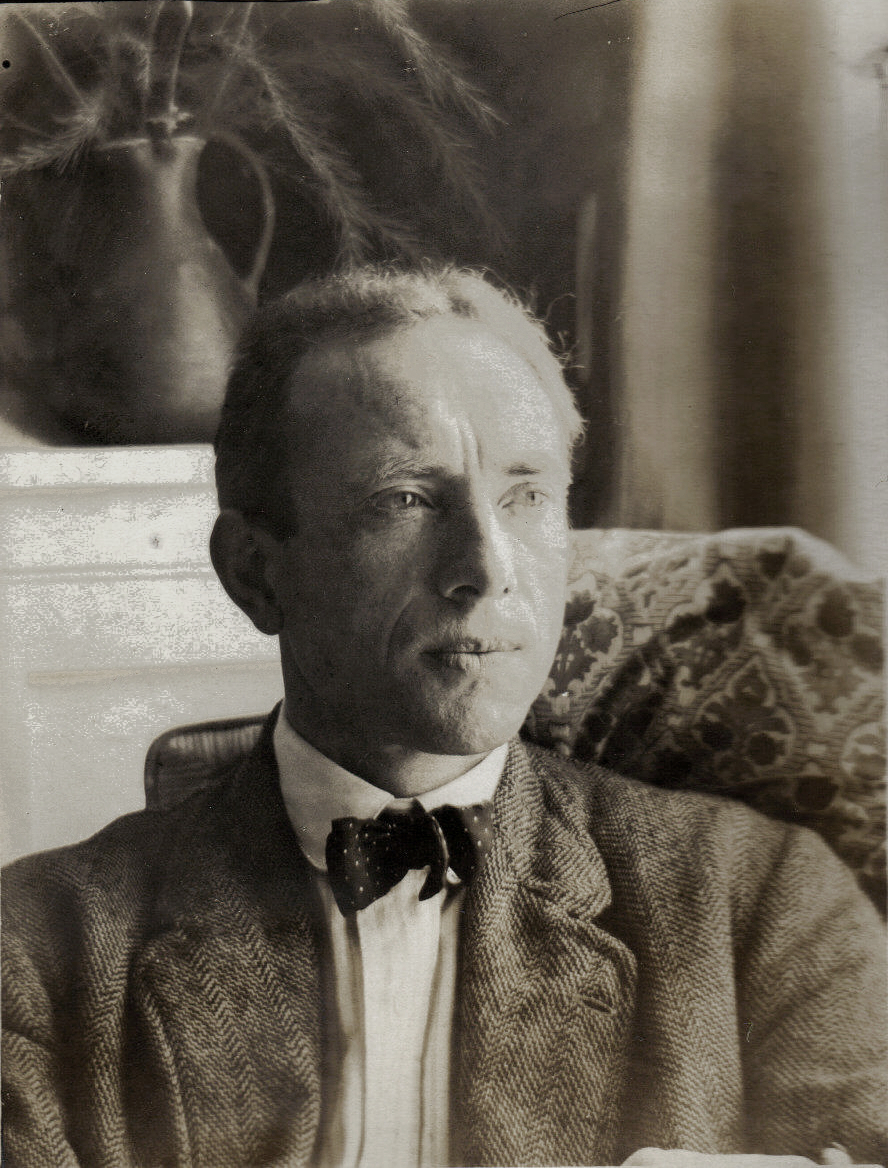
Scott in 1925

They gave many performances of the great standard works such as the Mass in B minor, the St Matthew Passion and St John Passion, the Christmas Oratorio, the Requiems of Mozart and Brahms, and many of the Handel oratorios. As an offshoot of the Philharmonic Choir appeared the Junior Philharmonic Choir, consisting of two to three hundred girls and young men from the London Secondary Schools' Festival, who gave several concerts from 1932 onwards in major religious works by Bach.

=== Recordings ===
- Mozart: Requiem Mass, K 626 (abridged version): Requiem aeternam, Kyrie, Dies Irae, Domine Jesu Christe, Hostias, Agnus Dei, Lux aeterna, Cum sanctis tuis. Soloists, Philharmonic Chorus and Orchestra, directed by C. Kennedy Scott, 6 July 1926, Queen's Hall (3 12-inch 78 rpm, HMV D 1147–49: others unpublished).
- Schubert: Mass in G major: Kyrie eleison, Gloria in Excelsis, Credo, Sanctus, Benedictus, Agnus Dei. Elsie Suddaby, soprano; Howard Fry, baritone; Percy Manchester, tenor; Philharmonic Choir; London Symphony Orchestra; directed by Charles Kennedy Scott, 2 and 3 July 1928 (3 12-inch 78 rpm, HMV D 1478–80).

== A Cappella Singers ==
Scott created the A Cappella Singers as a small group of 14 professional singers, for singing madrigals and part-songs under chamber-music conditions rather than in the concert hall. It was first assembled in 1922, and gave most of its performances in private houses or for music clubs, though occasionally singing at Queen's Hall in company with other Kennedy Scott choirs.

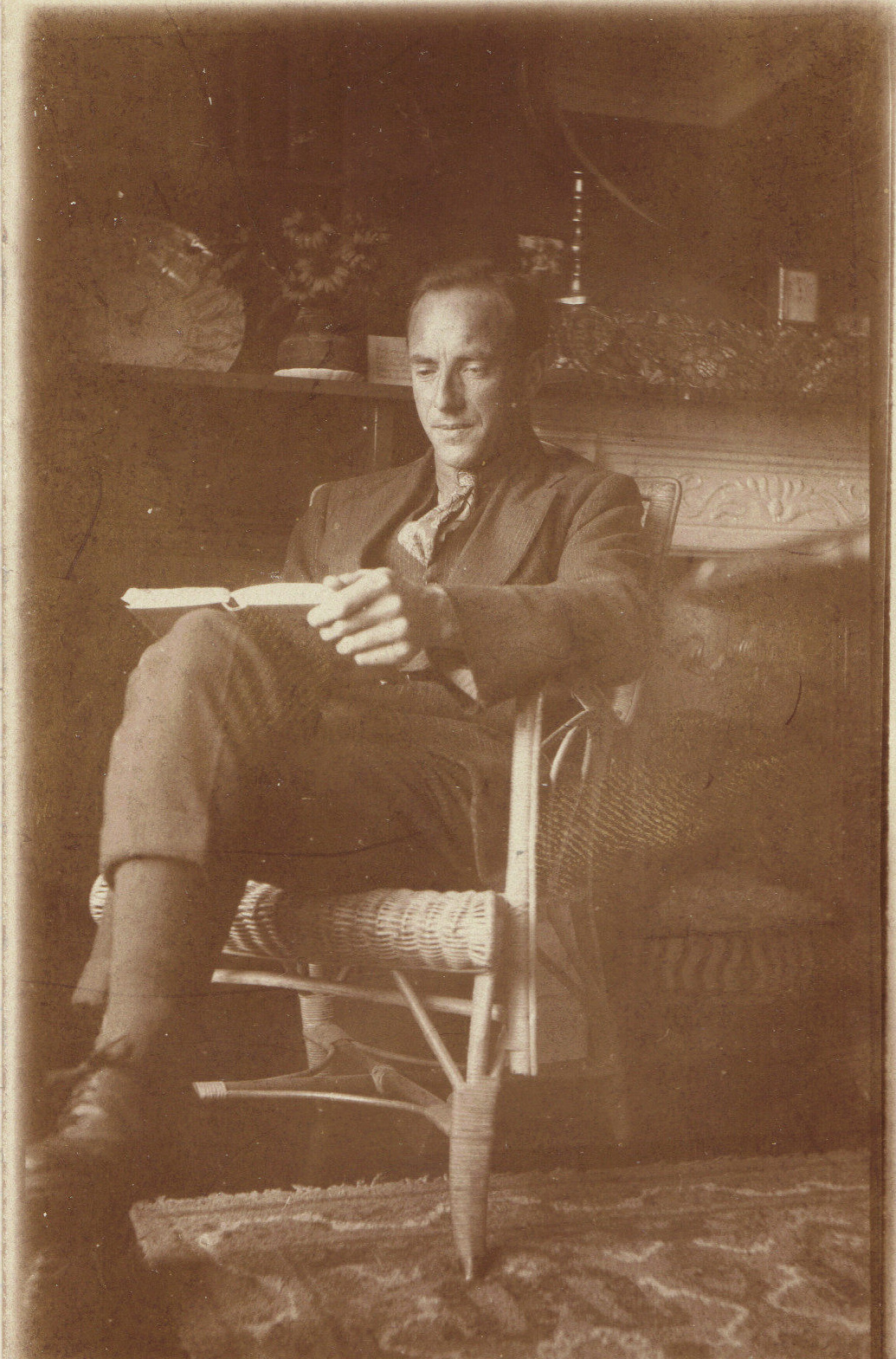
Scott in 1925

== Involvement in opera ==
In 1914, at the Glastonbury Festival, Scott conducted the first performance of Rutland Boughton's opera The Immortal Hour.

=== Recordings ===
- Purcell: Dido and Aeneas (first complete): Nancy Evans (Dido), Mary Hamlin (Belinda), Roy Henderson (Aeneas), Mary Jarred (Sorceress), Olive Dyer (Spirit), Dr Sydney Northcote (Sailor), Gladys Currie (Second woman), Gwen Catley and Gladys Currie (Witches), Charles Kennedy Scott's A Cappella Singers, Boyd Neel String Orchestra, Boris Ord (continuo), Clarence Raybould (conductor), Hubert J. Foss (Musical director). (Decca Records, X 101–107, 7 12-inch 78 rpm records, by subscription only for the Purcell Society).

Also in 1922 Scott founded the Euterpe String Players.

== The Bach Cantata Club ==
The Bach Cantata Club was formed in 1926, with the aim of making known the church and secular cantatas of J. S. Bach and his instrumental works, performed with resources similar to those which Bach himself must have planned for when he was composing. In this project Scott was joined by Hubert J. Foss and E. Stanley Roper (organist of the Chapel Royal), and they received assistance from the Bach musicologist Dr Charles Sanford Terry (who contributed programme notes, and gave a lecture on Bach's Chorales and Chorale Preludes in 1927) and from Dr W. G. Whittaker, director of the Newcastle Bach Choir (on which the London Club was partly modelled). The Vice-President was Dr Albert Schweitzer, who from time to time acted as organist at the Society's concerts. The choir of the Club consisted of twenty-five singers, mostly professional, while the instrumental work was an ensemble of London players called the Bach Chamber Orchestra. The choral concerts mostly took place at St. Margaret's, Westminster, and the orchestral performances at the Royal College of Music. A command performance of the unaccompanied motets was given before the king and queen at Buckingham Palace in 1927, and the Motet 'Jesu Joy and Treasure' was recorded for HMV in the same year.

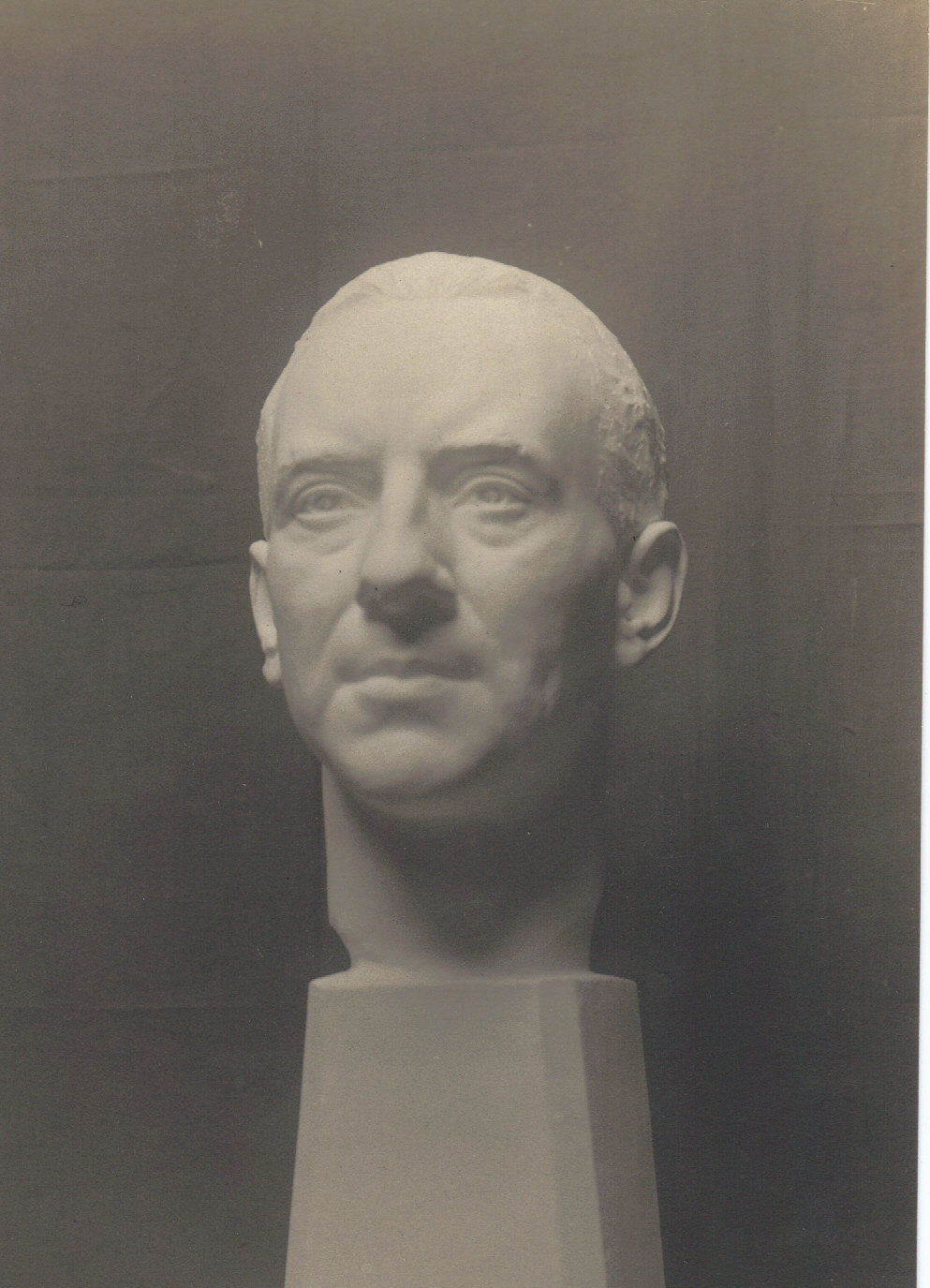
Bust of Scott, 1925

On 27 November 1929, at the Annual Extra Meeting, a bicentennial performance of the St Matthew Passion, in English, using Dr Troutbeck's version and rejecting the Elgar-Atkin treatment, was given at Westminster with a 90-minute interval for dinner. The following resources were employed:

- Bruce Flegg (Narrator); Keith Falkner (Jesus); Elsie Suddaby, Margaret Balfour, Archibald Winter, Arthur Cranmer.
- Recitatives by Elsie Warner (Pilate's wife), Helen Tresillian, Ethel Robinson (Damsels), Mary Morris, Herbert Parsons (False witnesses), Wesley Dennison (High Priest), Arthur Cranmer (Peter), Walter Millard (Pilate), Leonard Rogers (Judas).
- Obbligati by Joseph Slater (flute), Leon Goossens and James McDonagh (oboes), William Primrose (violin), Ivor James (cello).
- Bach Cantata Choir: Two choirs, each with eight sopranos, four contraltos, three tenors and four basses (the numbers made up with the assistance of members of the Oriana and Philharmonic Choirs). Also The Boys of St Margaret's.
- Bach Chamber Orchestra: Two orchestras, each with two first violins, two second violins, two violas, two cellos, one double bass, two flutes, and two oboes (alternating with oboi d'amore and cor anglais in the first orchestra). (Leader: William Primrose).
- Organ (Herbert Dawson); Harpsichord (Frederic Jackson); Conductor (Charles Kennedy Scott).

For the grand event of 1930 the Christmas Oratorio was given complete with Dorothy Silk, Margaret Balfour, Henry Wendon and Keith Falkner.

By this date the Club had held 22 meetings including three performances of the Mass in B Minor (one in St Margaret's Church and one in Queen's Hall), twenty-five Church Cantatas, four Motets, three secular Cantatas, and various composite programmes and instrumental works. The subscription rate was 24 shillings (£1.4s.0d., i.e. £1.20p sterling) for a single seat to five concerts, £2.2s.0d. (two guineas) for a double ticket and £3 for a treble. Single Guest Tickets were 5s.9d. per concert.

=== Recordings ===
- Bach: Jesus, Joy and Treasure (Jesu meine Freude) motet, Bach Cantata Club conducted by Charles Kennedy Scott, 1927 (2 78 rpm HMV D 1256–57).
- Columbia History of Music, Volume II – to the death of Bach and Handel:
  - (Bach Cantata Club Choir) Rejoice in the Lord alway; Handel: May no rash intruder (Solomon); Bach: Vater unser in Himmelreich and Herzlich thut mich verlangen; Jesu Joy of Man's Desiring.
  - (Strings of Bach Cantata Club) Like as the love-lorn turtle (with Doris Owens); Bach: E major violin concerto (with Yovanovitch Bratza); Sinfonia to Church Cantata 156 (with Leon Goossens); Rondeau and Badinerie from Suite in B minor for flute (with Robert Murchie).

== Later life ==
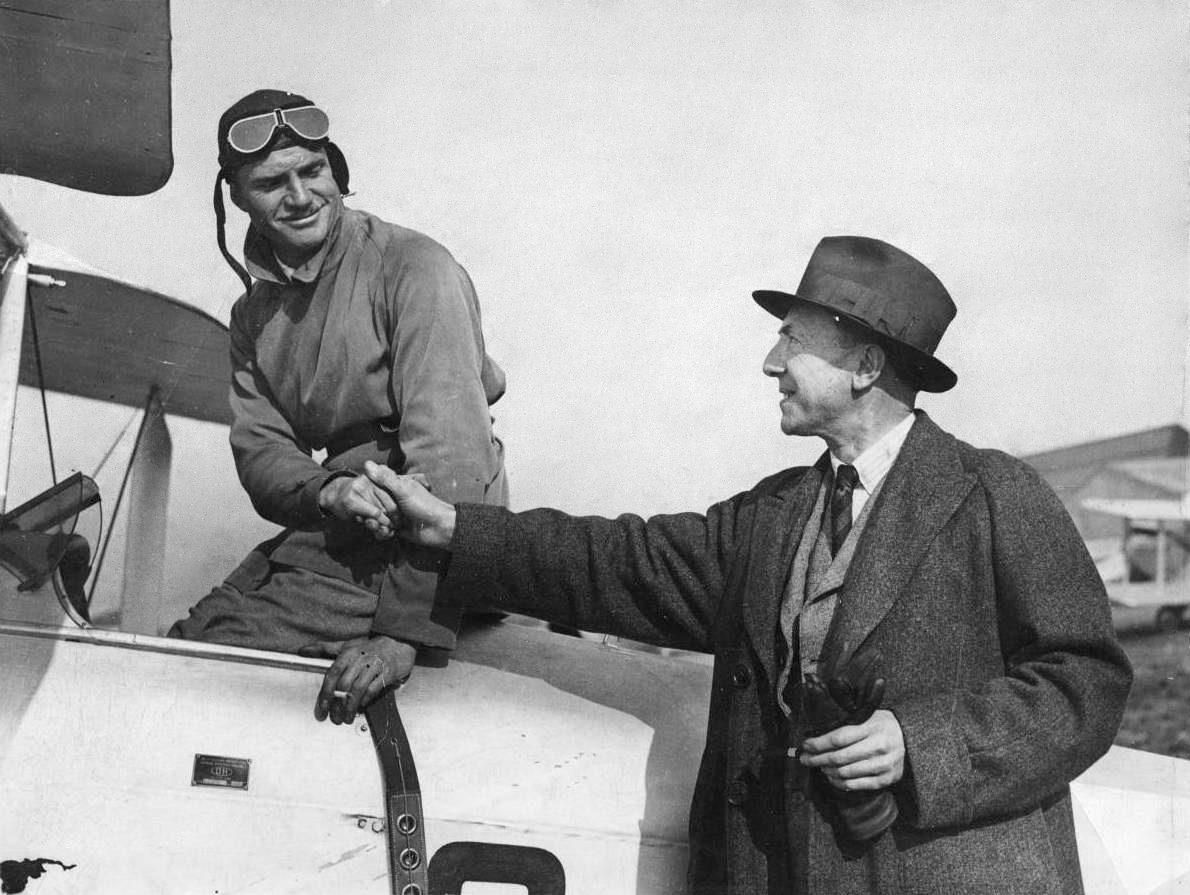
Charles Kennedy Scott, (right) with his son C. W. A. Scott

Scott was a member of staff of Trinity College of Music, Marylebone, London, from 1929 to 1965. He taught singing, conducted the College Choir, and was involved in the governance of the College. The College holds an archive relating to him, including manuscripts of some choral works, personal notebooks, concert programmes including many for the Oriana Madrigal Society, press cuttings and letters including correspondence received from well-known English composers. The collection also includes programmes from the memorial services of famous musicians which belonged to Kathleen Ewart, a singer in the Phoebus Singers, also a choir conducted by Scott. Scott died, aged 88, in London.

Charles Kennedy Scott and his wife Mary (née Donaldson) were the parents of the aviator C. W. A. Scott, who won the MacRobertson Air Race, The Schlesinger African Air Race and held several England-Australia record solo flights, they also had a son John Kennedy Scott and a daughter Barbara Hamilton Scott, who married Major Leslie Stewart-Brown in October 1926. In 1946 whilst posted at the UNRRA headquarters in Germany his son C.W.A. Scott committed suicide.

== Writings ==
- Madrigal Singing: A Few Remarks on the Study of Madrigal Music with an explanation of the Modes and a Note on their Relation to Polyphony (London 1907): 2nd, Amplified Edition (OUP, London 1931): Reprint (Greenwood Press 1970).
- Word and Tone: An English Method of Vocal Technique for Solo Singers and Choralists. In Two Books. Book I Theoretical, Book II Practical (2 vols, J.M. Dent & Sons, London 1933).
- The Fundamentals of Singing: An Inquiry into the Mechanical and Expressive Aspects of the Art. (Cassell & Co., London 1954).

Scott also compiled and wrote two biographies detailing the life of his son C. W. A. Scott the famous aviator, one of the books mainly contains letters he received home from C. W. A. Scott over his entire life, with a biographical context added throughout the book by Charles Kennedy Scott. The other book is a shortened biography written almost solely by C. K. S. Both manuscripts remain unpublished, however, work has been done to digitally copy the hard copy's as part of ongoing work to create the digital back up of the Scott family Archive. this work is being done by James Scott, and Tim Barron who are both Charles's great grandchildren, they also plan to publish an edited version of one of these books at some time in the future once more work has been done to add some extra detail to what will become the publishable biography or life story of C. W. A. Scott.

== Musical publications ==
- The Chelsea Song Book (folio), 20 traditional songs arranged for piano by Charles Kennedy Scott, with calligraphy by Margaret Shipton and 21 full and half-page chromolithographs by Juliet Wigan (Cresset Press Ltd, London 1927).
- Giovanni Battista Pergolesi Stabat Mater edited and arranged by Charles Kennedy Scott, (OUP London c.1927).
