= Serenade to Music =

Music based on The Merchant of Venice by William Shakespeare

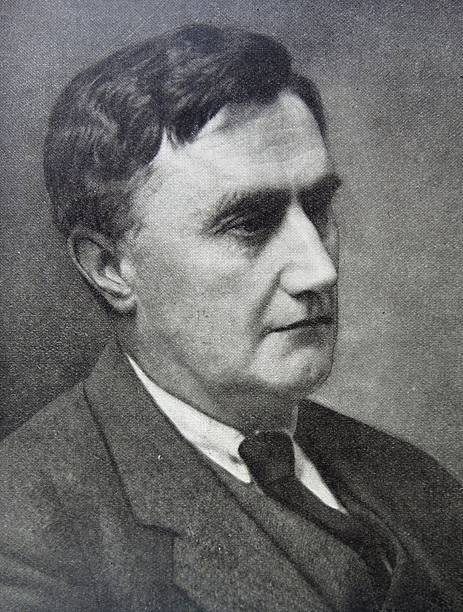
Portrait of Ralph Vaughan Williams by Herbert Lambert in the 1920s

Serenade to Music is an orchestral concert work completed in 1938 by English composer Ralph Vaughan Williams, written as a tribute to conductor Sir Henry Wood. It features an orchestra and 16 vocal soloists, with lyrics adapted from the discussion about music and the music of the spheres from Act V, Scene I from the play The Merchant of Venice by William Shakespeare. Vaughan Williams later arranged the piece into versions for chorus and orchestra and solo violin and orchestra.

== History ==
Vaughan Williams wrote the piece as a tribute to the conductor Sir Henry Wood to mark the fiftieth anniversary of Wood's first concert. The solo parts were composed specifically for the voices of sixteen eminent British singers chosen by Wood and the composer. In some parts of the work, the soloists sing together as a "choir," sometimes in as many as twelve parts; in others, each soloist is allotted a solo (some soloists get multiple solos). The published score places the initials of each soloist next to his or her lines.

Wood conducted the first performance at his jubilee concert at the Royal Albert Hall on 5 October 1938. The orchestra comprised players from three London orchestras – the London Symphony Orchestra, the BBC Symphony Orchestra and the London Philharmonic Orchestra. The soloists were:

Sopranos:	Isobel Baillie, Lilian Stiles-Allen, Elsie Suddaby, Eva Turner
Contraltos:	Muriel Brunskill, Astra Desmond, Mary Jarred, Margaret Balfour
Tenors:	Heddle Nash, Frank Titterton, Walter Widdop, Parry Jones
Baritones:	Harold Williams, Roy Henderson
Basses:	Robert Easton, Norman Allin

Sergei Rachmaninoff played in the first half of the concert as soloist in his Second Piano Concerto; when he heard the Serenade from his place in the audience, he was so overcome by the beauty of the music that he wept.

On 15 October 1938, Wood made the first recording (with the same soloists and the BBC Symphony Orchestra) at His Master's Voice's Abbey Road Studio No. 1. Vaughan Williams and His Master's Voice donated copyright fees received from the initial record sales to the Henry Wood Jubilee Fund, which was established to endow London hospital beds for British orchestral musicians.

Vaughan Williams, realising the difficulty of assembling sixteen soloists for future performances, subsequently made arrangements for four soloists plus choir and orchestra, for choir and orchestra, for choir and piano, and for solo violin and orchestra. Wood premiered the orchestral version in February 1940. The orchestra consists of two flutes (second doubling piccolo), oboe, cor anglais, two clarinets, two bassoons, four horns, two trumpets, three trombones, tuba, timpani, percussion, harp, and strings.

Vaughan Williams conducted a performance of the original version of the Serenade during the inaugural concerts at the new Royal Festival Hall in 1951. The orchestra was the Liverpool Philharmonic and eleven of the original sixteen soloists sang; Ena Mitchell replaced Turner, Gladys Ripley replaced Balfour, and William Herbert, Richard Lewis and Stephen Manton replaced Titterton, Widdop and Jones. The performance was recorded and has been released on CD.

Leonard Bernstein included the Serenade to Music in his programme for the New York Philharmonic's concert for the opening of Avery Fisher Hall in New York on 23 September 1962. The soloists were Adele Addison, Lucine Amara, Eileen Farrell, Lili Chookasian, Jennie Tourel, Shirley Verrett-Carter, Charles Bressler, Richard Tucker, Jon Vickers, George London, Ezio Flagello and Donald Bell. The performance was recorded live and has been issued on CD by Sony Classical.

== Text ==
In arranging Shakespeare's text, Vaughan Williams followed the word order, but cut words, phrases, and whole lines, and repeated at the end eleven words from the third and fourth lines, producing the following text. The initials mark the singers' solo passages; ensemble passages are shown in italics:

How sweet the moonlight sleeps upon this bank!
Here will we sit and let the sounds of music
Creep in our ears: soft stillness and the night
Become the touches ^{IB} of sweet harmony.
^{HN} Look how the floor of heaven
Is thick inlaid with patines of bright gold:
^{FT} There's not the smallest orb that thou behold'st
But in his motion like an angel sings,
^{WW} Still quiring to the young-eyed cherubins;
Such harmony is in immortal souls;
^{PJ} But whilst this muddy vesture of decay
Doth grossly close it in, we cannot hear it.
^{SA} Come, ho! and wake Diana with a hymn!
With sweetest touches pierce your mistress' ear,
And draw her home with music.
^{ES} I am never merry when I hear sweet music.
^{RE} The reason is, your spirits are attentive –
^{HW} The man that hath no music in himself,
^{RH} Nor is not mov'd with concord of sweet sounds,
^{RE} Is fit for treasons, stratagems and spoils;
^{NA} The motions of his spirit are dull as night
And his affections dark as Erebus:
Let no such man be trusted. ^{MBr} Music! hark!
It is your music of the house.
^{AD} Methinks it sounds much sweeter than by day.
^{MJ} Silence bestows that virtue on it
^{ET} How many things by season season'd are
To their right praise and true perfection!
^{MBa} Peace, ho! the moon sleeps with Endymion
And would not be awak'd. Soft stillness and the night
Become the touches ^{IB} of sweet harmony.

== Recordings ==
The recordings of the original version, for sixteen singers and orchestra, are conducted by Sir Henry Wood (1938), the composer (1951), Sir Adrian Boult (1969), Matthew Best (1990) and Sir Roger Norrington (1996). In the table below, each row shows the original singer, followed by those performing the same part in the later recordings.

Wood	Composer	Boult	Best	Norrington
Isobel Baillie	Isobel Baillie	Norma Burrowes	Amanda Roocroft	Felicity Lott
Lilian Stiles-Allen	Lilian Stiles-Allen	Sheila Armstrong	Anne Dawson	Lisa Milne
Elsie Suddaby	Elsie Suddaby	Susan Longfield	Linda Kitchen	Rosa Mannion
Eva Turner	Ena Mitchell	Marie Hayward	Elizabeth Connell	Yvonne Kenny
Muriel Brunskill	Muriel Brunskill	Gloria Jennings	Sarah Walker	Catherine Wyn-Rogers
Astra Desmond	Astra Desmond	Shirley Minty	Jean Rigby	Ann Murray
Mary Jarred	Mary Jarred	Meriel Dickinson	Diana Montague	Diana Montague
Margaret Balfour	Gladys Ripley	Alfreda Hodgson	Catherine Wyn-Rogers	Della Jones
Heddle Nash	Heddle Nash	Bernard Dickerson	John Mark Ainsley	Toby Spence
Frank Titterton	William Herbert	Wynford Evans	Martyn Hill	John Mark Ainsley
Walter Widdop	Richard Lewis	Kenneth Bowen	Arthur Davies	Anthony Rolfe Johnson
Parry Jones	Stephen Manton	Ian Partridge	Maldwyn Davies	Timothy Robinson
Harold Williams	Harold Williams	Christopher Keyte	Gwynne Howell	Stephen Roberts
Roy Henderson	Roy Henderson	John Noble	Thomas Allen	Christopher Maltman
Robert Easton	Robert Easton	John Carol Case	Alan Opie	Michael George
Norman Allin	Norman Allin	Richard Angas	John Connell	Robert Lloyd
BBC Symphony	Liverpool Philharmonic	London Philharmonic	English Chamber Orchestra	London Philharmonic

The wholly orchestral version has been recorded by the London Philharmonic under Vernon Handley and the Northern Sinfonia of England under Richard Hickox.

== In popular culture ==
The Serenade to Music figures prominently in No Distance Left to Run, a 2010 documentary film about the British rock band Blur. The film also features Vaughan Williams's The Lark Ascending.
