= Basil Neame =

Basil Desmond Neame

Basil Desmond Neame CBE (14 October 1921 – 25 February 2010) was a Kentish fruit grower and farmer.

== Life and farming ==
Basil Desmond Neame was a farmer and fruit grower in Kent, and an active figure in the agricultural industry. He was born in Kilburn, London in 1921 and died in Tankerton, Kent in 2010. He was educated at Cheltenham College and the Royal Agricultural College. He was the first son of Sir Thomas Neame and the British contralto Astra Desmond CBE. He was the nephew of Sir Philip Neame.

Neame was involved in fruit growing activities in Kent and across the South East for several decades between the late 1940s and the 1990s.

=== Early career ===
After studying at Cheltenham and the Royal Agricultural College Basil Neame served in the Royal Engineers and Madras Sappers and Miners in India, Burma and Malaysia from 1941 to 1946. He was mentioned in despatches and achieved the rank of Major at Bangalore.

=== Fruit growing activities ===
Joining the family farming business in 1947, for the next five decades he was engaged in fruit growing, arable farming and hop growing across a number of farms including Macknade and Westwood Farms near Faversham and Harefield in Selling.

Neame was extensively involved in fruit growing and farming activities beyond his farm, holding a range of key posts in research agricultural training. Former East Kent Fruit Society chairman David Simmons referred to him as godfather to the fruit industry.

Key roles included:

- Chairman of NFU (National Farmers Union) Kent branch in 1956
- Governor of Hadlow College from 1959 to 1985
- Member of Committee – Further Education for Agriculture (Advisory Council) – 1964
- First Chairman of the Agricultural Training Board in 1966
- Governor of Wye College from 1971 to 1987
- First Chairman of the Kent Farming and Wildlife Advisory Group in 1978
- Member of the APRC (Apple and Pear Research Council) Council and Breeding and Varietal Development Advisory Committee.
- Trustee of the East Malling Trust for Horticultural Research/ East Malling Research centre
- Director of East Kent Packers Ltd from 1970–1992, being Chairman from 1973 to 1980, and President from 1994.

His achievements were acknowledge in 1970 when he was appointed CBE.

=== Other local activities ===
Basil Neame was the second President of Macknade Cricket Club until his death in 2010.

He was also an avid naturalist and a vice-president of the Kent Wildlife Trust.

== Family ==
In 1948, Neame married Stella Roe. They had four children. After the death of his wife in 1991 he was remarried in 1997 to Ann Partis.

Basil Neame died at the age of eighty-eight on 25 February 2010.
