= Robert Easton (bass) =

British singer (1898–1987)

Easton in the late 1920s

Robert Miller Easton (8 June 1898 – 26 May 1987) was a British bass of the mid-twentieth century. He was known both in the concert hall, where he sang in oratorios and other choral works, and in opera, appearing in bass roles at the Royal Opera House, Covent Garden and on tour.

In concert and on record Easton performed many popular ballads, and was one of the original sixteen soloists in Ralph Vaughan Williams's Serenade to Music, premiered and recorded in 1938. In his later years he was a respected and sought-after adjudicator for singing competitions.

== Life and career ==
Easton was born in Sunderland, on 8 June 1898. He joined a church choir at the age of six, and studied at Bede Collegiate School, Sunderland. When he was seventeen he joined the army. He was severely wounded in the First World War, having a leg amputated. He was in hospital for more than three years, and while he was there a colleague singled his voice out as an instrument of great promise. That view was confirmed by a well-known singing teacher, Signor Bozzelli, and after being invalided out of the army Easton trained as a singer, studying under Dinh Gilly and Harry Plunket Greene.

According to The Times, Easton's career began at the leading British music festivals, "where his strong, vibrant bass was much in demand". By 1921 he was singing, to good notices, in major venues including the Queen's Hall, London. He became known for his singing in oratorios, such as Haydn's The Seasons. He told a reporter in 1929 that he had recently sung in Handel's Messiah on seven successive evenings all round Britain.

Easton had a parallel operatic career. He sang at Covent Garden during six successive opera seasons and toured with the British National Opera Company. In Sir Thomas Beecham's Covent Garden seasons in the 1930s Easton's roles included Fafner in Das Rheingold and Siegfried, The critic W. J. Turner wrote that Easton and Ludwig Weber (Fasolt) "were as splendid a pair of giants as I have ever heard". The reviewer in The Times said that Easton "added to Fafner's fearsome presence a tremendously resonant voice and set some of the other singers a good example in clear enunciation". In the 1937 Covent Garden season Easton sang Titurel in Parsifal, conducted by Fritz Reiner.

In addition to opera and concert work, Easton was well-known for singing popular ballads, both in recitals and on record. In the mid-1920s he began to make records for the Columbia company and made a long series of well-received discs of ballads and of more ephemeral material, as well as more serious music such as Handel arias, all, according to The Times, "showing his excellent diction and imposing voice". He was a favourite singer of Beecham's who cast him as Méphistophélès in his 1929 recording of Gounod's Faust, and as Schaunard in a 1935 recording of the final act of Puccini's La bohème with Dora Labbette (singing as "Lisa Perli") as Mimì and Heddle Nash as Rodolfo.

On 5 October 1938 Easton was one of the original sixteen singers in Ralph Vaughan Williams's Serenade to Music. The solo lines composed for him set the words, "The reason is, your spirits are attentive" and "Is fit for treasons, stratagems and spoils". Sir Henry Wood, the dedicatee, conducted the premiere and he and the soloists reassembled to record the work for Columbia at EMI's studios ten days later. The recording has been reissued in a digital transfer for CD.

After the Second World War Easton continued to sing for many years, and was in demand as an adjudicator at singing competitions. The Times described his adjudications as "wise and well-informed", and added "His jovial personality and fund of good stories made him a racy companion at these events".

Easton died in Surrey aged 88, on 26 May 1987.
