= Margaret Balfour =

English classical contralto

Margaret Balfour (1889 – January 1961) was an English classical contralto of the 1920s and 1930s. She is best remembered as the angel in Elgar's own recorded excerpts of The Dream of Gerontius (1927) and one of the 16 soloists in the original performance of Vaughan Williams's Serenade to Music (1938).

She was also recorded by His Master's Voice singing Bach's Mass in B Minor with Elisabeth Schumann and the London Symphony Orchestra conducted by Albert Coates in sessions in 1929 at Kingsway Hall, London. She sang in the St Matthew Passion in November 1929 (with Keith Falkner and Elsie Suddaby) at Westminster with the Bach Cantata Club under Charles Kennedy Scott. She sang in Beethoven's Symphony No. 9 with the BBC Choral Society and the BBC Symphony Orchestra conducted by Arturo Toscanini at the Queen's Hall, London, on 22 May 1939. She was a soloist at the Handel Festival conducted by Sir Henry Wood at Alexandra Palace in 1939.

== Sources ==
- UK Civil Registration Index
- Olson, Ruth. '[STUDLEY] Re: Roll call ', Rootsweb.com STUDLEY-L Archives, (15 December 2000) Retrieved 12 April 2005
- Barwell, Ivan. "The Finest Concert Organ in Europe" : A Brief History of The Willis Concert Organ at the Alexandra Palace (London, 1993)
- Date of death
- Music Web International
- Wellington Choral Society
