= Norman Allin =

British bass singer

Norman Allin CBE (19 November 1884 – 27 October 1973) was a British bass singer of the early and mid twentieth century, and later a teacher of voice.

== Early studies ==
Allin was born in Ashton-under-Lyne in 1884. He studied at the Royal Manchester College of Music under John Acton (singing) and Walter Carroll (theory). He married the teacher Edith Clegg in 1912 and went to London, where the conductor Sir Henry Wood heard him and planned to involve him in the 1914 Norwich Festival. The festival was interrupted by the outbreak of World War I. However, Allin did sing the Handel aria "O ruddier than the cherry", from Acis and Galatea, at a Promenade Concert for Wood during the war.

== Operatic career ==
Sir Thomas Beecham auditioned him and at once offered him the title role in Mussorgsky's Boris Godunov, but Allin felt a less challenging debut was needed. So, his first appearance for Beecham was as the Old Hebrew in Samson et Dalila on 15 October 1916. With the Beecham Opera Company he appeared, too, in Verdi's Aida. He first sang at a Royal Philharmonic concert, again under Beecham's baton, in 1918. He later appeared as Boris, as Gurnemanz in Wagner's Parsifal, Hagen in Wagner's Götterdämmerung and Baron Ochs in Richard Strauss's Der Rosenkavalier at the Royal Opera House, Covent Garden. In 1921, he became a founder-member of the British National Opera Company.

Allin created the role of Sir John Falstaff in Holst's 1925 opera At the Boar's Head. In 1934, he appeared in the initial Glyndebourne Festival production under Fritz Busch and Carl Ebert of Mozart's The Marriage of Figaro.

== Concert and oratorio ==
Allin was perhaps best known to contemporary music-goers as a concert recitalist and an oratorio singer. He appeared before the Royal Philharmonic Society in a Royal Choral Society Beethoven Missa Solemnis in 1927 under Sir Hugh Allen. In 1932, after giving his 270th performance of Handel's Messiah, at a Halle concert, he decided not to sing the part again.

He always gave the greatest satisfaction when he sang in music festivals, and Wood felt that he could trust him with anything. He was one of the soloists in the original line-up for Vaughan Williams's Serenade to Music on 5 October 1938. The words set for his solo are 'The motions of his spirit are dull as night, And his affections dark as Erebus,' the lowest-lying solo line of the work. He was also in the performance of the piece for the Royal Philharmonic Society, on behalf of the Musicians' Benevolent Fund, in February 1940.

== Teaching career ==
In 1934 he took part in a seven-month operatic tour in Australia, appearing mainly in Melbourne and Sydney. On his return he was offered a professorship of singing at the Royal Academy of Music, and took it up in autumn 1935. Later he also accepted a similar appointment at the Royal Manchester College, which he held jointly with the other, only resigning the Manchester post in 1942 owing to pressure of work in London.

== Recordings ==
Norman Allin recorded for Columbia Records. His recording career lasted from circa 1916 to circa 1940. Many of his titles were cut twice, first acoustically and then, after 1925, electrically.

Among the acoustic recordings was an early best-seller, the 10" record of Bruno Huhn's 'Invictus' (to words of W. E. Henley) coupled with Coningsby Clarke's 'The Blind Ploughman'. This was re-made electrically. Examples of his operatic and concert titles are:

- Handel: O Ruddier than the Cherry (Acis and Galatea)
- Handel: Honour and Arms (Samson)
- Handel: Aria from Partenope
- Handel: But Who may Abide?, The People that Walked in Darkness, The Trumpet Shall Sound, and Why do the Nations? (Messiah)
- Mozart: O Isis and Osiris, and Within These Hallowed Dwellings (The Magic Flute)
- Mozart: See the Way You Rogues (Il Seraglio)
- Halévy: Tho' Faithless men (Si la rigueur) (La Juive)
- Wagner: Wotan's farewell (Die Walküre)
- Wagner: Hagen's Watch, and Hagen's Call (Götterdämmerung)
- Tchaikovsky: To the Forest
- Loewe: Edward
- Gounod: items from Faust
- Gounod: Nazareth
- Gounod: Jésus de Nazareth (1932, w. BBC Chorus, cond. Stanford Robinson)
- Gounod: She Alone Charmeth my Sadness (La reine de Saba)
- Jean-Baptiste Faure: The Palms
- Richard Strauss: A Lied.
- Vaughan Williams: Serenade to Music (recorded immediately after the concert premiere in 1938).
- He recorded duets with Frank Mullings, Hubert Eisdell and Dora Labbette.

Allin died, aged 88, at Pontrilas.

== Sources ==
- BBC Radio 3 broadcast written and presented by John Steane, 1988, for the 50th anniversary of the Serenade to Music.
- D. Brook, Singers of Today (Revised Edition – Rockliff, London 1958), 11–15.
- Arthur Eaglefield Hull, A Dictionary of Modern Music and Musicians (Dent, London 1924).
- R. Elkin, Royal Philharmonic (Ryder, London 1946).
- Harewood, Kobbé's Complete Opera Book (Putnam, London 1954).
- R. Pound, Sir Henry Wood, a biography (Cassell, London 1969).
- Rosenthal, Harold and John Warrack. (1979, 2nd ed.). The Concise Oxford Dictionary of Opera. London, New York and Melbourne: Oxford University Press. p. 8. ISBN 0-19-311318-X.
- Sadie, Stanley and Christina Bashford. (1992). The New Grove Dictionary of Opera. London: Macmillan Publishers Ltd. Vol. 1, p. 94. ISBN 0-935859-92-6.
- Sadie, Stanley and John Tyrrell. (2001).The New Grove Dictionary of Music and Musicians. London: Macmillan Publishers Ltd. Vol. 1, p. 405. ISBN 0-333-60800-3.
- H.J. Wood, My Life of Music (Cheap Edition, Gollancz, London 1946).
