= Harold Williams (baritone) =

Australian baritone and music teacher (1893 – 1976)

- Born: Harold John Williams; 3 September 1893; Sydney, Australia
- Died: 5 June 1976 (aged 82); Sydney, Australia
- Occupations: operatic baritone, musical teacher
- Years active: 1921–1976

Harold John Williams MBE (3 September 1893 – 5 June 1976) was an Australian baritone and music teacher. Born in Sydney, he had a career in England and his native country, performing in opera, oratorio and concerts and giving radio broadcasts.

== Early years ==
Williams was born on 3 September 1893 at Woollahra, a suburb of Sydney, the third child of Owen Williams, a Victorian-born plumber, and his Scottish wife Isabella, née Wylie. Leaving Woollahra Superior Public School at 14, Harold worked as a messenger-boy, then as a railway stores clerk. He sang with the Waverley Methodist Church choir as a boy soprano and later an amateur baritone; but he found that 'football and cricket were the most absorbing affairs of my life'. He played for Waverley Cricket Club (1906–15) and Rugby Union as a wing-three-quarter with the Eastern Suburbs team, representing New South Wales against New Zealand in August 1914.

On 24 July 1915, during World War I, Williams enlisted in the Australian Imperial Force (AIF). Before leaving Australia, he became engaged to Miss Doris Price, another member of the Waverley Methodist Church choir. He was sent to Europe aboard the troop transport Argyllshire in May 1916, having been made a corporal with the 9th Field Ambulance section. During the voyage, his delivery of ballads became popular fare with his fellow soldiers at shipboard entertainments. After military training in England, he was promoted to sergeant and sent to France with his unit in November 1916, seeing action at Armentières. In January 1917, he was transferred at General William Birdwood's request to an entertainment unit, known as the 'Anzac Coves'. He then rejoined the 9th Field Ambulance in March, saw action at Passchendaele and Messines, and was appointed regimental quartermaster-sergeant.

On leave in England in 1918, Williams sang at a private party at Sheffield. Present in the audience were several musical luminaries who insisted that he should begin voice lessons as soon as possible. In August he transferred to the 1st Australian Auxiliary Hospital, Harefield, where he met Dorothy Mason, a staff nurse in the Australian Army Nursing Service, after which, he broke his engagement to Doris Price. The war ended in November 1918, and he began to study singing in London with Charles Phillips and strove to overcome his lack of basic musical knowledge. Attached to AIF Headquarters in London from April 1919, he married Dorothy at St Marylebone's parish church on 5 May that year. Demobilised from the army in July, he found a civilian job as secretary to the Stearn Electric Lamp Company. Reassured that he had 'a fine natural voice', Williams entered numerous competitions. Although his début recital in December at the Wigmore Hall, London, was kindly received by the critics, he remained with the Stearn company until 1920.

== Career ==
After working to tone down his Australian accent, Williams received a great deal of musicale, concert and oratorio work throughout England and began a long association with the Columbia Graphophone Company, making records under assumed names such as 'Geoffrey Spencer' as well as his own.

Williams made his operatic debut in 1921 as Wolfram in Richard Wagner's Tannhäuser. In 1929 he toured Australia with the pianist William Murdoch. Five years earlier, he had sung in the stage première of Samuel Coleridge-Taylor's The Song of Hiawatha in London under the baton of Eugene Goossens. With the exception of the 1929 season, he would appear in all later performances of the work until 1939. He was also a famous Elijah in Mendelssohn's oratorio of the same name.

Williams appeared with most of the greatest conductors of his time, including Arturo Toscanini, Bruno Walter, Otto Klemperer, Sir John Barbirolli, Sir Adrian Boult and Sir Thomas Beecham. When in England he sang in every season of Sir Henry Wood's Promenade Concerts in 1921–51. An acclaimed performer in Elgar's oratorio The Dream of Gerontius, Williams often worked with the composer. He sang at Elgar's memorial service in 1934 as well as at the coronation of King George VI and Queen Elizabeth in 1937.

In 1938, he was one of 16 singers invited to take part in the first performance of the Serenade to Music, written by Vaughan Williams to mark Sir Henry Wood's Silver Jubilee as a conductor. Although the concert hall was his natural milieu, he also performed such roles as Iago (Otello), Wolfram (Tannhäuser) and Tonio (Pagliacci) with the British National Opera Company until its demise in 1929. For 16 seasons, he also sang such parts as Mephistopheles (Faust) and Boris (Boris Godunov) at Covent Garden, in London.

His 1933 English-language recording, with his countryman and bass Malcolm McEachern, of "The Gendarmes' Duet" from Offenbach's opera Geneviève de Brabant is an example of the gramophone.

Having toured Australia in 1929 for J. & N. Tait, Williams was urged by the Australian Broadcasting Commission to return to his homeland for the Thomas Beecham tour of 1940. He proceeded to become a touring soloist throughout the duration of World War II and also taught at the New South Wales State Conservatorium of Music in Sydney. In September 1946, he took part in the concert marking the inauguration of the BBC Third Programme, singing in the Serenade to Music, with Isobel Baillie, Astra Desmond, Bradbridge White and the BBC Symphony Orchestra and chorus conducted by Sir Adrian Boult.

== Later years ==
To children listening to ABC radio in the 1940s, '50s and '60s, he was "Orpheus" of the Argonauts Club. He performed the program's opening and closing theme, and delivered weekly humorous pieces. This link continued long after he had left the concert stage — a commitment totalling more than 20 years. He did, however, leave the ABC program temporarily in 1946 to return to Britain for the inaugural Edinburgh Festival, held in 1947.

In 1952, Williams rejoined the Conservatorium staff in Sydney at the request of an old acquaintance, the conductor/composer Eugene Goossens, who was now the Conservatorium's director. He once said that he had 'never overcome the onslaught of nervousness' when on stage during his career. Although he had some notable pupils, he was not a strikingly successful teacher of voice production; further, he knew almost nothing of the lieder repertoire and had little strength in non-English languages.

Williams continued to sing in opera and concerts until his voice failed him during a Melbourne performance of Elijah in December 1953. He also appeared in the film The Story of Gilbert and Sullivan in 1952. He belonged to the Savage Club and took a house at Selsey, Sussex, played village and club cricket, and reputedly never missed a Test match; his friends included the Australian cricketers Alan Kippax, Stan McCabe and Bill O'Reilly.

He was appointed a Member of the Order of the British Empire (MBE) in 1966 and retired from musical endeavours in 1972.

Survived by twin daughters, Williams died in 1976 at the age of 82 in the Sydney suburb of Gordon, and was cremated.
