= Elsie Suddaby =

British lyric soprano

Elsie Suddaby (1893–1980) was a British lyric soprano during the years between World War I and World War II. She was born in Leeds, a first cousin once removed to the organist and composer, Francis Jackson.

A pupil of Sir Edward Bairstow, she was known as "The Lass With The Delicate Air" (taken from the title of one of the most popular songs in her repertoire).

She was principal soprano in the bicentennial St Matthew Passion with Keith Falkner and Margaret Balfour for the Bach Cantata Club under Charles Kennedy Scott in November 1929. On 5 October 1938 she was one of the original 16 singers – lightest of the four soprano voices – in Vaughan Williams’s Serenade to Music. (The solo line set for her was ‘I am never merry when I hear sweet music.’)

She created the soprano part in Vaughan Williams's Thanksgiving for Victory in 1945, and the following year she took part in the opening programmes for the BBC Third Programme in a broadcast of Milton's masque Comus with Peggy Ashcroft, John Laurie, Heddle Nash and Dylan Thomas. On 22 May 1951 she appeared in scenes from Purcell's King Arthur in the Festival of Britain Purcell recitals at the Victoria and Albert Museum under Anthony Lewis.

When Sir Thomas Beecham made his second recording of Handel's Messiah (HMV ALP 1077-80), Suddaby was the soprano soloist.

Leeds Town Hall has a room named after Suddaby, who died in England at the age of 87.
