= J. B. Steane =

English musicologist

Steane c. 2005

John Barry Steane (12 April 1928 – 17 March 2011) was an English music critic, musicologist, literary scholar and teacher, with a particular interest in singing and the human voice. His 36-year career as a schoolmaster overlapped with his career as a music critic and author of books on Elizabethan drama, and opera and concert singers.

Among Steane's works are critical studies of Christopher Marlowe and Alfred Tennyson, and a series of books on music, concentrating on singing and singers. He contributed to a range of musical journals, including Gramophone and The Musical Times, and wrote articles for the Grove Dictionary of Music and Musicians and the Oxford Dictionary of National Biography

== Life and career ==
=== Early years ===
Steane was born in Coventry, the son of William John Steane and his wife, Winifred. He was educated at King Henry VIII School, Coventry. While there, he became a member of the Coventry Cathedral choir. When the cathedral was destroyed by bombing in 1940, Steane moved to the neighbouring Holy Trinity Church. After leaving school and before going up to the University of Cambridge, he undertook his national service, where among those he met was Sergeant Edward Greenfield, who became a lifelong friend and later a colleague of Steane in music criticism.

From 1948 to 1952 Steane attended Jesus College, Cambridge, where he studied English under A. P. Rossiter. Among the other influences on him at Cambridge was the controversial scholar F. R. Leavis. After graduating he joined the staff of Merchant Taylors' school Northwood, Middlesex, where he became a housemaster and head of English. An obituarist wrote in 2011 that Steane influenced many aspects of the school's life, including not only English, but also sport, music and drama, and "the breadth of his intellect and the warmth of his personality made him an inspirational guide for generations of students".

=== English literature ===
In 1964, the Cambridge University Press published Steane's first book, Marlowe: A Critical Study, giving a short (23 page) biographical study of the Elizabethan playwright, Christopher Marlowe, together with a comprehensive (350-page) study of his works. Reviewing the book, The Times said of Steane, "He possesses the authority which derives from intimate knowledge … creative criticism of the highest quality." The Times Literary Supplement (TLS) wrote, "He has turned an acute and sensitive mind upon Christopher Marlowe and both the author and ourselves should be thankful to him." For the same publisher, Steane edited and introduced Thomas Dekker's The Shoemaker's Holiday in an edition published in 1965, and Ben Jonson's The Alchemist, in 1967.

Steane's literary interests were not confined to the Elizabethans; in 1966 he wrote a volume on Tennyson for a new series, "Literature in Perspective", to which his fellow contributors included Margaret Drabble, Norman Sherry and Fred Inglis; the TLS thought Steane's book "brilliant, informative and admirably written", and much the best of the four. In 1969 he edited, and wrote the introduction to, the Penguin edition of Marlowe's plays. In 1972 he published his last contribution to English literary scholarship, an edition of Thomas Nashe's, The Unfortunate Traveller and other works.

=== Music criticism ===
Music was a lifelong passion with Steane. During his years at Merchant Taylor's he regularly played the organ for chapel services. An obituary in The Times, noting that choral music, and particularly the music of the Anglican liturgy, remained one of his greatest loves, observes, "his beautifully observed and straightforwardly expressed views about the art of singing brought him to the attention of the EMI record producer Walter Legge, who suggested to the editors of Gramophone magazine that he would be a useful adornment to its panel of contributors."

Steane began writing for Gramophone in 1972. In 1974 he took over from Desmond Shawe-Taylor the long-running quarterly feature, "The Gramophone and the Voice", giving a second opinion on vocal issues reviewed in recent issues of the magazine. An editor of the magazine commented that Steane's views were "beautifully judged, invariably generous and always elegantly crafted". In 1999, the magazine published in book form a collection of these articles from the previous 25 years.

In 1974, Steane published his book The Grand Tradition: Seventy Years of Singing on Record, 1900–1970 which covered the history of recorded singing. It was enthusiastically received by the critics. The TLS wrote that singers had found in Steane "their Keats or Baudelaire, the poet of the sensations they create." The reviewer praised his ability to characterise a singer with phrases of "poetic refinement", though not eschewing humour, quoting his description of Nellie Melba changing in the course of one song "from Juliet at the ball to a knees-up-mother-Brown pearly-queen". In The Musical Times, Harold Rosenthal vigorously dissented from some of Steane's opinions, but he too praised his gift for the "apt choice of a word or phrase to sum up a singer's art or voice". Music & Letters called it "a book for the connoisseur". American Record Guide called Steane's erudition "formidable" and the book "essential".

In the 1980s Steane began writing articles and reviews in The Musical Times. Many of his contributions were about famous singers of the past, or reviews of books about them. These included Claudia Muzio, Beniamino Gigli, Lauritz Melchior, Enrico Caruso, and Margaret Burke Sheridan. His literary expertise was employed in a piece about the poets whose music Britten chose to set. Other articles drew on his long and wide experience of opera and song, from Puccini to Hugo Wolf. He also contributed many reviews and articles to Opera (from 1981), Opera Now (from 1989), and Classic Record Collector.

Steane contributed numerous entries in the Grove Dictionary of Music and Musicians and the New Grove Dictionary of Opera. The online combined edition of Grove at May 2011 listed 359 articles by him, mostly about singers, but with some about other subjects such as the conductor Tullio Serafin and the pianist Graham Johnson. He wrote the articles in the Oxford Dictionary of National Biography on Roy Henderson and Nellie Melba. Steane's Voices, Singers and Critics was published in 1992, Elisabeth Schwarzkopf: A Career on Record (with Alan Sanders) in 1995, and his three-volume Singers of the Century appeared between 1996 and 2000.

Steane retired from Merchant Taylor's in 1988. In 2008 he was honoured by the Worshipful Company of Musicians, on the occasion of his 80th birthday. He died at the age of 82. His final contribution to Gramophone, an appreciation of a vintage recording of The Barber of Seville with Maria Callas and Tito Gobbi, was published posthumously in May 2011.

== Bibliography ==
=== Author ===
- Marlowe: A Critical Study, Cambridge University Press (Cambridge, England), 1964, second edition, 1970.
- Tennyson, Evans Brothers (London), 1966, Arco (New York, NY), 1969.
- The Grand Tradition: Seventy Years of Singing on Record, Scribner (New York, NY), 1974, reprinted, Amadeus Press (Portland, OR), 1993.
- Voices, Singers and Critics, Amadeus Press, 1992.
- Elisabeth Schwarzkopf: A Career on Record (with Alan Sanders and Elisabeth Schwarzkopf), Amadeus Press, 1995.
- Singers of the Century, Amadeus Press, Volume 1, 1996, Volume 2, 1999, Volume 3, 2000.
- The Gramophone and the Voice: 25 Years of Quarterly Writings from the Pages of Gramophone, Gramophone, 1999.

=== Editor ===
- Thomas Dekker, The Shoemaker's Holiday, Cambridge University Press, 1965.
- Ben Jonson, The Alchemist, Cambridge University Press, 1967.
- Christopher Marlowe, The Complete Plays, Penguin (Harmondsworth), 1969.
- Thomas Nashe, The Unfortunate Traveller and Other Works, Penguin, 1972.

== Sources ==
- Webber, Christopher (2015). John Barry Steane in Dictionary of National Biography
- Sadie, Stanley, ed. (1992). The New Grove Dictionary of Opera, vol. 4, p. 529. Oxford: Oxford University Press. ISBN 978-0-19-522186-2.
- Steane bibliography at WorldCat
