= Isobel Baillie =

Scottish opera singer (1895–1983)

Isobel Bailie
- Baillie in the 1920s
- Born: Isabella Douglas Baillie; 9 March 1895; Hawick, Roxburghshire, Scotland
- Died: 24 September 1983 (aged 88); Manchester, England
- Occupations: Opera singer, teacher
- Years active: 1923–1983
- Spouse: Henry Leonard Wrigley (m. 1917; died 1957)
- Children: 1

Dame Isobel Baillie DBE (née Isabella Douglas Baillie; 9 March 1895 – 24 September 1983) was a Scottish soprano. She made a local success in Manchester, where she was brought up, and in 1923 made a successful London debut. Her career, encouraged by the conductor Sir Hamilton Harty, quickly developed, with breaks in the first years for vocal study in Milan. Baillie's career was almost wholly as a concert singer: she only once acted in an opera production on stage. She was associated above all with oratorio, becoming well known for her many performances in Handel's Messiah, Haydn's The Creation, Mendelssohn's Elijah and the choral works of Elgar.

During a long career, Baillie sang in complete recordings of Messiah, Elijah, Beethoven's Missa solemnis and Ninth Symphony. In the 1940s she formed a friendship with the contralto Kathleen Ferrier, with whom she appeared frequently in concert and made several recordings of duets. She took part in 19 annual Three Choirs Festivals from 1929. She made her American debut in 1933 and between then and her retirement from the concert platform in the mid-1950s she sang in the US, New Zealand, the Far East and Africa as well as in Europe.

In her later years, Baillie was a teacher in the Royal College of Music, Royal Manchester School of Music and Cornell University.

== Life and career ==
=== Early years ===
Isabella Douglas Baillie was born in Hawick, Roxburghshire, on 9 March 1895, the youngest child and third daughter of Martin Pott Baillie (1860–1904), a baker, and his wife, Isabella Hetherington née Douglas (1865–1936). She was christened Isabella Douglas but was known to family and friends as Bella. While she was a young girl the family moved to Newcastle upon Tyne and then to Manchester. She attended a board school, where her singing was encouraged, and then won a scholarship to Manchester High School, where music was not a high priority.

At fifteen, Baillie left school, working first in a music shop and then in Manchester Town Hall. She took singing lessons from Jean Sadler-Fogg, a former pupil of Blanche Marchesi. In her spare time she sang at local concerts, at one of which in about 1913 she met Henry (Harry) Leonard Wrigley (1891–1957), a cotton trader. They married on 31 December 1917 while he was on sick leave from the armed forces in France. Their only child, a daughter, Nancy, was born in December 1918. By this time, she was earning more from concert fees than from her work at the town hall and she became a full-time professional. In 1921, Hamilton Harty, conductor of the Hallé Orchestra, engaged her for several concerts, including performances of Haydn's The Creation and Handel's Messiah.

=== Leading soloist, 1923–1940 ===
Baillie made her London debut in 1923 as Isobel Baillie. Sir Henry Wood engaged her for six concerts at the Queen's Hall. Her career quickly developed, but on Harty's advice she took a break from concert-giving in mid-1925 and another the following year to study in Milan with the vocal coach at La Scala, Gugliemo Somma. Harty further helped her in her career by suggesting a change of professional name from "Bella Baillie" ("he felt that it led one to expect a music hall or musical comedy artist") On 6 May 1929 she placed a notice in The Times stating that from that date Miss Bella Baillie would sing under the name of Isobel Baillie. As The Times obituarist put it, for thirty years after her London debut "she was in constant demand on the concert platform, making a speciality of Messiah, The Creation, Elijah, and the choral work of Elgar".

She made her American debut in 1933 at the Hollywood Bowl with Harty conducting; among the numbers she sang were "With verdure clad" from The Creation, an aria from Carmen and "Dove sono" from The Marriage of Figaro. The Los Angeles Times said of the last, "For style and sheer loveliness of sound [it] was the finest thing that has been heard in the Bowl for a long, long time".

In Britain, Baillie sang for the leading conductors of the 1930s, including Sir Thomas Beecham, Sir Adrian Boult and Malcolm Sargent, and visitors from overseas, including Arturo Toscanini, Bruno Walter and Victor de Sabata.

Among the concert highlights of Baillie's career in the 1930s was the premiere of Vaughan Williams's Serenade to Music for 16 vocal soloists and orchestra, composed in 1938 to mark the fiftieth anniversary of Wood's first concert. The soloists were eminent singers from Britain and the Commonwealth; the opening and closing lines were sung by Baillie. Ten days after the concert Wood and his 16 singers recorded the work for Columbia, "thereby", in the words of Michael Kennedy, "preserving her marvellous ascent to top A on the words 'sweet harmony'". The recording has been reissued in digital form.

Baillie had been a pioneer broadcaster, singing on a local Manchester radio station in 1920, before the foundation of the BBC, and in 1938 she took part in an early television broadcast in a BBC adaptation of Tristan und Isolde. She frequently sang excerpts from Wagner and other operas in concert and studio performance, but rarely appeared in the opera house. She did so at Covent Garden in 1937 for Orphée et Eurydice, but even then she was not seen, but provided the offstage voice of "L'ombre heureuse". Her only onstage appearances in opera were in 1940 on a tour of New Zealand as Marguerite in Faust with Heddle Nash in the title role.

Baillie's career was essentially that of a concert artist. She sang at nineteen Three Choirs Festivals, beginning in 1929 at Worcester Cathedral, in Messiah, conducted by Sir Ivor Atkins. She sang in Elgar's The Apostles and The Kingdom under the baton of the composer. Other British composers with whose music she was associated included Herbert Howells, George Dyson and Gerald Finzi. Although she was known for her performances of British music, Kennedy comments that her repertory was "wider than was often supposed", including many works by Bach, Berlioz, Brahms, Dvořák, Kodály, Mendelssohn, Rachmaninoff "(The Bells as well as songs)", Schubert, Schumann, Richard Strauss, Szymanowski, Tchaikovsky and Hugo Wolf. "In addition she sang a vast number of popular ballads."

=== Later years, 1940–1983 ===
During the Second World War Baillie toured widely for ENSA, singing to troops and factory workers. In December 1941 she performed with Kathleen Ferrier for the first time; they became good friends as well as colleagues. After the war, Baillie made a second trip to New Zealand in 1948, returning home via the Far East, stopping in Singapore, Kuala Lumpur, and Penang, giving recitals in all of them. She sang in Honolulu in 1948, and Washington National Cathedral the following year; in 1953 she made a tour of southern Africa, giving recitals in cities including Nairobi, Salisbury, Johannesburg, Cape Town and Durban.

By the mid-1950s, having mostly retired from concert performance, Baillie toured internationally, giving lecture-recitals and masterclasses. She embarked on a new career as a teacher at the Royal College of Music in London, from 1952 to 1957 and again from 1961 to 1964, in between which she was visiting professor of singing at Cornell University. In addition she taught for many years at the Royal Manchester School of Music.

In 1982, she published her autobiography, Never Sing Louder than Lovely, described by Kennedy as "valuable for its details about the singing of Messiah and for vivid pen-portraits of her colleagues".

Baillie's husband, Henry Leonard "Harry" Wrigley, died in 1957. She then moved from their house in Hampshire to St John's Wood, London. Her last home was back in Manchester, where she died on 24 September 1983 at the age of 88. She was survived by her daughter, Nancy Roberts (d. 2012).

== Recordings ==
Baillie's recording career stretched across fifty years. Her first recording was a test disc made in February 1924; her first commercial release came the following year; her last major recording was in 1953 in A Sea Symphony, in Decca's Vaughan Williams symphony cycle under Boult; and in 1974 she recorded a song by Harty, released to mark her eightieth birthday.

Baillie was soprano soloist in complete recordings of Beethoven's Missa solemnis (under Beecham, 1937) and Messiah and Elijah (under Sargent, 1946 and 1947) In 2004, there was released for the first time a live recording, made in the Queen's Hall in 1937, of Beethoven's Ninth Symphony conducted by Toscanini with Baillie as soprano soloist. With Ferrier she recorded duets by Purcell and Mendelssohn, Her solo recordings featured numerous pieces by Bach, Handel and Mendelssohn, but also arias or songs by composers including Arne, Brahms, Delius, Grieg, Harty, Haydn, Mozart, Offenbach, Rachmaninoff, Schubert and Schumann.

== Honours ==
Baillie was appointed Commander of the Order of the British Empire (CBE) in 1951 and promoted to Dame Commander (DBE) in 1978. She was the recipient of honorary degrees from the Royal College of Music, the Royal Academy of Music and the University of Manchester. There is a blue plaque commemorating her on a former residence in Manchester.

== Sources ==
- Baillie, Isobel (1982). Never Sing Louder than Lovely. London: Hutchinson. ISBN 978-0-09-150460-1.
