= Lilian Stiles-Allen =

British soprano singer (1890–1982)

Lilian Stiles-Allen (28 July 1890 – 15 July 1982) was a British soprano of the mid-20th century.

== Early life ==
She was born Lilian Elizabeth Allen in Devonshire Street, Marylebone, in 1890, and later added her mother's maiden name.

Her musical education was at the Guildhall School of Music and Drama, where she won the Sheriff's Prize for contraltos in 1909, and in Vienna undertaking an extensive study of Lieder.

== Career ==
Her career was primarily on the concert stage, her physique being unsuited to operatic performance, but an early theatrical appearance was in the comedy Eastward Ho! in 1919.

By the 1920s, she was established as a leading concert soprano. Her appearances included the Handel Festival at the Crystal Palace; a revival of Sullivan's The Golden Legend; Messiah with Sir Thomas Beecham and Malcolm Sargent; Verdi's Requiem (Sargent); Beethoven's Choral Symphony (Sir Henry J. Wood); Handel's Solomon (Beecham); Samuel Coleridge-Taylor's The Song of Hiawatha (Sargent); and Mendelssohn's Elijah (Sir Adrian Boult).

In addition to the standard repertoire, Stiles-Allen sang in Schoenberg's Gurre-Lieder under the composer; Delius's A Mass of Life (Beecham); and Mahler's Eighth Symphony (Wood).

On 5 October 1938, she was one of the original 16 singers in Vaughan Williams's Serenade to Music. (Her solo lines were "Come, ho! and wake Diana with a hymn! With sweetest touches pierce your mistress' ear, And draw her home with music.") The Serenade to Music has been reissued on CD by Dutton.

Though not physically suited to the operatic stage, Stiles-Allen took leading operatic roles in studio broadcasts for the BBC, including Handel's Rodelinda and Gluck's Armide.

She recorded for the Edison Bell Company a number of operatic arias (a few in Italian), oratorio arias and songs. Most of these are quite rare, and have not yet been transcribed to CD.

As a teacher, she included among her pupils the young Julie Andrews.

Stiles-Allen died in Tunbridge Wells.
