= Royal Choral Society =

- Logo of the Royal Choral Society

Background information
- Also known as: RCS
- Origin: London, England, United Kingdom
- Genres: Classical
- Years active: 1871-present
- Website: www.royalchoralsociety.co.uk

The Royal Choral Society (RCS) is an amateur choir, based in London.

== History ==
Formed soon after the opening of the Royal Albert Hall in 1871, the choir gave its first performance as the Royal Albert Hall Choral Society on 8 May 1872 – the choir's first conductor Charles Gounod included the Hallelujah Chorus from Messiah in the inaugural concert. On 9 July 1891, the Royal Choral Society performed in a 'Grand Concert for the Visit of Their Imperial Majesties, The German Emperor and Empress', also attended by the Prince of Wales and the Duke and Duchess of Edinburgh. From the beginning, performing premieres of new choral works has been a feature of the choir's repertoire. Both Giuseppe Verdi and Antonín Dvořák conducted the choir in premières of their own works, as have Edward Roxborough, Ariel Ramírez, Raymond Premru and Geoffrey Burgon in more recent years. The choir continued to be conducted by the most eminent musicians of the day, most notably Sir Malcolm Sargent, whose association with the choir spanned forty years. Towards the end of his life Sargent appointed Charles Proctor as chorusmaster, and Proctor often deputised for him when he was too ill. The present Music Director, Richard Cooke, took over the baton in 1995.

Today, the choir enjoys maintaining a balance between its heritage and the opportunities on offer performing for today's music lovers. In addition to its traditional repertoire, singers have had a chance to take part in new and unusual events, from open-air concerts in Hampton Court and Glastonbury, to singing at the launch of the Queen Mary 2, participating in the 25th anniversary ceremony for the Falklands, to performing at performances for the reopening of the Royal Festival Hall.

In 2009, the RCS celebrated the 131st anniversary performance of its Messiah on Good Friday concerts at the Royal Albert Hall; the annual Summer Concert in that year was a performance of Sergei Rachmaninoff's All Night Vigil (Vespers) at St Bartholomew's Church in Brighton on 4 July. The RCS continued its annual residency at Southwark Cathedral, performing Pergolesi and Mozart's Requiem on Remembrance Day, Wednesday 11 November 2009. The RCS was also invited twice to perform at Slovakia's equivalent to Glastonbury – Pohoda, (which means Wellbeing) where the choir closed the opening day of the festival with a candlelit midnight concert of Rachmaninoff's Vespers, followed by a performance in Bratislava.
