= Gwynn Parry Jones =

Welsh opera singer (1891–1963)

Parry Jones (14 February 1891 – 26 December 1963), known early in his career as Gwynn Jones, was a Welsh tenor of the mid-twentieth century.

== Life and career ==
Gwynn Parry Jones was born in Blaina, Monmouthshire. He studied at the Royal Academy of Music, and in Weimar and Milan. Among his teachers were John Coates and Albert Visetti. Jones made his debut in 1914 and shortly thereafter went on an opera and concert tour to the United States. He was returning to England aboard the RMS Lusitania in May 1915 when it was torpedoed and sunk by a German U-boat. Over 1000 passengers and crew died, but Jones was one of 761 survivors.

He joined the D'Oyly Carte Opera Company in July 1917 playing principal tenor roles in Gilbert and Sullivan's H.M.S. Pinafore, Iolanthe, Princess Ida, and The Yeomen of the Guard. He then joined the Beecham Opera Company and later was a founder member of the British National Opera Company. At this time he changed his professional name from Gwynn Jones to Parry Jones.

In the concert hall, his repertoire included the tenor parts in Handel's Judas Maccabaeus and Messiah and Haydn's The Creation. He sang with Toscanini in Beethoven's Ninth Symphony.

In the opera house, his roles included such different tenor roles as Tannhäuser and the Duke in Rigoletto. In the post-war Covent Garden company he appeared in Peter Brook's production of Boris Godunov; the staging of The Magic Flute designed by Oliver Messel; the première of Arthur Bliss and J. B. Priestley's The Olympians; and Der Rosenkavalier, conducted by Erich Kleiber.

His recordings include the first complete recording of Mendelssohn's Elijah, made at Central Hall, Westminster in 1930, and Stravinsky's Les Noces made at EMI's Abbey Road Studio No. 1 in July 1934, conducted by the composer, and John Ireland's These Things Shall Be, recorded in 1948 with the Hallé Orchestra and Sir John Barbirolli. He also recorded operetta songs and ballads, under the pseudonym 'Roland Oliver', which were issued on the Regal label.

In 1938, he was one of the four tenors featured in the line-up of 16 eminent singers who performed in the première of Vaughan Williams's Serenade to Music, celebrating Sir Henry Wood's silver jubilee as a conductor. In their individual lines, the four tenors were given music specially written for their voices, Jones's plaintive timbre following the two lyric tenors and one Heldentenor with the only downbeat line in the piece ('But whilst this muddy vesture of decay/Doth grossly close it in…').

Jones appeared at English music festivals and that of the International Society of Contemporary Music (1938). In addition to opera and oratorio, his repertoire included German Lieder, French and English songs, and contemporary music: he sang in the first performances in England of Wozzeck, Gurrelieder, Doctor Faustus and Lady Macbeth of Mtsensk. He was the subject of This Is Your Life in 1957 when he was surprised by Eamonn Andrews at the King's Theatre, Hammersmith, London. He was later honoured in his home town Blaina along with Mostyn Thomas and others, by having a street named after him in the Forgeside council estate in 1985. He taught at the Guildhall School of Music and Drama in London, where he died.

== Sources ==
- Who Was Who in the D'Oyly Carte Opera - company website:
- University of Kent, Templeman Library, Theatre Programme Collection
- BBC Radio 3 broadcast, 1988, written and presented by J. B. Steane
- Donald Brook, Singers of Today Revised ed. (Rockliff, London 1958), pp. 125-129
