= Heddle Nash =

British singer

Heddle Nash

William Heddle Nash (14 June 1894 – 14 August 1961) was an English lyric tenor who appeared in opera and oratorio. He made numerous recordings that are still available on CD reissues.

Nash's voice was of the light tenor class known as "tenore di grazia". The critic J. B. Steane referred to him as "the English lyric tenor par excellence, without equal then or now." He appeared in tenor roles in operas by Mozart, Verdi, Wagner and Puccini among others, at the Royal Opera House, and the Glyndebourne Festival. His operatic career lasted from 1924 to 1958.

As a concert singer, Nash was known for his performances in oratorio, and in particular in the title role of Elgar's The Dream of Gerontius, making the first gramophone recording of the work, in 1945.

== Biography ==
=== Early years ===
Nash was born in the South London district of Deptford on 14 June 1894, the son of William Nash, master builder, and his wife, Harriet Emma née Carr. The family was musical, and listening at home to a gramophone record by Enrico Caruso prompted Nash to apply for a scholarship at the Blackheath Conservatoire of Music. He was accepted, but a week later World War I broke out. Nash joined the army, serving in France, Salonika, Egypt and Palestine.

The Blackheath scholarship was held open until after the war; Nash took it up on his return. He had some experience of concert and oratorio work, and then he accepted an offer to sing with Podrecca and Feodora's Italian Marionettes. Unseen, standing in the orchestra pit of the Scala and Coliseum theatres, he sang the tenor roles in many Italian operas while on the stages the puppets mimed the action. After the London season, the marionette company secured a contract to appear in New York; Nash went with them. On his return to London a friend advanced the money for him to study in Milan with Giuseppe Borgatti. On 7 April 1923 Nash married Florence Emily Violet Pearce, daughter of a sign manufacturer. They had two sons, John Dennis Heddle Nash (1926-1994), who became an operatic baritone, and David Leonard Heddle Nash (1930-2024).

While studying with Borgatti, Nash made his operatic debut in 1924 at the Teatro Carcano in Milan, when he replaced an indisposed tenor in the role of Almaviva in Rossini's Il barbiere di Siviglia. It was a notable success. After singing at Turin, Bologna and Genoa, Nash returned to England with his wife in 1925. He had developed an Italianate style of singing that remained with him: it was said of him that he sang everything as though it were by Verdi.

=== Opera in England ===
On his return to London Nash was engaged by the Old Vic Company under Lilian Baylis to sing tenor roles in English. His first part for the company was the Duke in Rigoletto. His success was instantaneous. The Musical Times said that it was a pleasure to welcome a very beautiful tenor voice, praised his clarity of diction, and predicted that Nash would be one of the eminent lyric tenors of the future. At the Old Vic he appeared as Tonio in The Daughter of the Regiment, in the title role in Faust, as Pinkerton in Madama Butterfly and as Tamino in The Magic Flute. At the end of the Old Vic season he joined the British National Opera Company, going on tour with the company after a short London season. His roles included Almaviva, Fenton in Falstaff, Turiddu in Cavalleria rusticana, Roméo in Roméo et Juliette, Des Grieux in Manon and David in Die Meistersinger von Nürnberg.

In 1929, Nash made his debut at the Royal Opera House, Covent Garden as Don Ottavio in Don Giovanni in the company's International Season. He sang leading tenor roles in Italian and French operas at Covent Garden until World War II, including Almaviva, Pinkerton, Faust, Roméo, Rodolfo in La bohème, Eisenstein in Die Fledermaus, Rinuccio in Gianni Schicchi, and Pedrillo in Die Entführung aus dem Serail. The critic Alan Blyth called Nash the leading British lyric tenor of the 20th century, and considered him "ideal casting for the heroes of French 19th-century Romantic opera." Nash had a repertoire of twenty-four operas, and sang fluently in English, French, German and Italian. He was proud of being the first Englishman to sing David in Die Meistersinger in the International Season at Covent Garden.

In the first Glyndebourne season, in 1934, Nash played Basilio in Le nozze di Figaro at the inaugural performance, Pedrillo, and Ferrando in Così fan tutte. He sang these three roles every year until 1938, adding Ottavio in Don Giovanni in 1937. The critic Richard Capell wrote, "Hardly another tenor of his time has sung Mozart with such elegance and at the same time such a minstrel-like effect of spontaneity." Nash also sang in lighter musical stage works, appearing in Carl Millöcker's The Dubarry in 1932, and Edward German's Merrie England in 1945.

During the war Nash toured with the Carl Rosa Opera Company, often singing opposite the Australian soprano Joan Hammond. His roles included Faust, Pinkerton and Rodolfo. After the Royal Opera House reopened following its wartime closure, Nash sang Des Grieux and David. His last appearance at Covent Garden was in Die Meistersinger in April 1948. He continued to appear on stage until July 1958, when he reprised a character role that he had created a year earlier, Dr Manette in Arthur Benjamin's A Tale of Two Cities at Sadler's Wells. The Musical Times called it "a most moving performance".

=== Oratorio and later career ===
Nash's career was not restricted to opera; he gave many song recitals, made radio broadcasts and performed in concerts and oratorio productions all over Britain. In 1931, he was chosen by Sir Edward Elgar to sing the title role in The Dream of Gerontius, in a performance conducted by Elgar himself. Henceforth, Nash was closely associated with the part, singing it at every Three Choirs Festival from 1934 to 1950. The critic Sir Neville Cardus considered him the greatest of all exponents of the part. Nash's 1945 recording of Gerontius with Malcolm Sargent is still regarded by many critics as unsurpassed.

Nash sang regularly in Messiah, and other oratorios. In 1938, he was one of the 16 singers chosen by Ralph Vaughan Williams to perform his Serenade to Music, composed as a tribute to Sir Henry Wood. The work was recorded soon afterwards, with the same 16 singers. This historic performance can be heard on CD re-issues.

In his later years, Nash was appointed professor of singing at the Royal College of Music. He sang in his last Messiah a few months before his death from lung cancer on 14 August 1961. On his tombstone in Chislehurst Cemetery are carved the opening words of part two of The Dream of Gerontius: "I went to sleep and now I am refreshed."

== Recordings ==
Many of Nash's recordings have been reissued on compact disc. He made his first recordings for Columbia Records during the late 1920s and early 1930s. These were mostly of operatic titles, including arias from The Magic Flute, Don Giovanni, Il barbiere di Siviglia, Lehár's Friederike, Jeptha, L'elisir d'amore and Rigoletto, plus a number of English songs and ballads. His 1932 Columbia recording of the serenade from Bizet's La jolie fille de Perth, sung in English, became a best-seller, making a little-known item of music extremely popular in his homeland. In 1927, he participated in the recording of complete English-language versions of Leoncavallo's Pagliacci and Mascagni's Cavalleria rusticana with the forces of the British National Opera. In 1935, he recorded a complete Act IV of Puccini's La bohème conducted by Beecham. Nash was the tenor in Beecham's first LP recording of Messiah, issued in 1953. The Gramophone wrote, "Those who are apt to remember him as an essentially lyrical tenor should turn up his "Sound an Alarm" from Judas Maccabaeus, which is nothing if not robust."
