= Missa solemnis (Beethoven) =

1824 mass by Beethoven

- by Ludwig van Beethoven
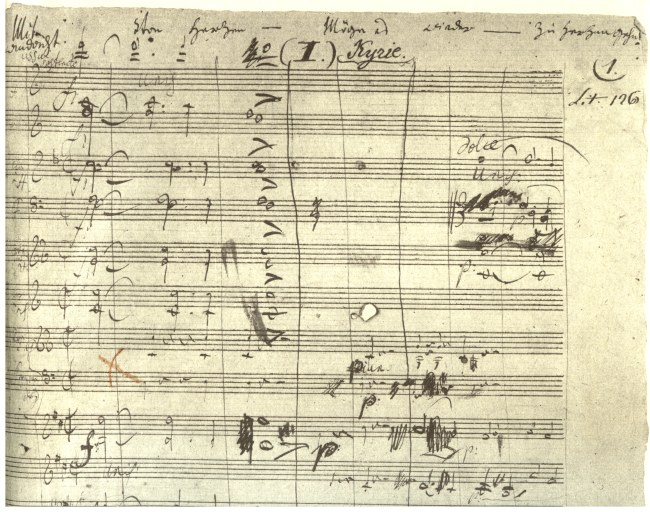
- Autograph, beginning of the Kyrie, with the famous dedication "Von Herzen..." and the performance advice "Mit Andacht" ("with devotion")
- Key: D major
- Opus: 123
- Text: Mass ordinary
- Language: Latin
- Dedication: Rudolf of Austria
- Performed: 7 April 1824: Saint Petersburg
- Scoring: soloists; choir; orchestra

The Missa solemnis in D major, Op. 123, is a Solemn Mass composed by Ludwig van Beethoven from 1819 to 1823. It was first performed on 7 April 1824 in Saint Petersburg, Russia, under the auspices of Beethoven's patron Prince Nikolai Golitsyn; an incomplete performance was given in Vienna on 7 May 1824, when the Kyrie, Credo, and Agnus Dei were conducted by the composer. It is generally considered one of the composer's supreme achievements and, along with Bach's Mass in B minor, one of the most significant Mass settings of the common practice period.

Written around the same time as his Ninth Symphony, it is Beethoven's second setting of the Mass, after his Mass in C major, Op. 86. The work was dedicated to Archduke Rudolf of Austria, Archbishop of Olomouc, Beethoven's foremost patron as well as pupil and friend. The copy presented to Rudolf was inscribed "Von Herzen—Möge es wieder—Zu Herzen gehn!" ("From the heart – may it return to the heart!")

== History ==
=== Composition history ===
The Missa Solemnis is Beethoven's third choral composition on a sacred subject, after the oratorio Christus am Ölberge (1802), and his earlier mass setting, the Mass in C major (1807). The new composition was written to celebrate the investiture of Rudolph of Habsburg-Lorraine as Archbishop of Olomouc, which took place on 9 March 1820.

The sketchbooks and the correspondence reveal that the composer worked on the Missa solemnis for a period of four years, starting on the spring of 1819; it is also of the same year the text of the Ordinary that Beethoven chose for the composition: it contains the Latin text, with the signs of the words' accentuation and the simultaneous translation in German. The autograph score was completed on the spring of 1823.

As a preparation for the Mass, Beethoven extensively studied monophonic plainchant, as well as the Renaissance and Baroque sacred music of composers such as Palestrina, J. S. Bach and Handel, and the rich tradition of Austrian Masses.

It is known that in 1820, while working on the mass, Beethoven studied church modes by referring to Glareanus' Dodekachordon and Gioseffo Zarlino's Istitutioni Harmoniche; these are two of the most influential music treatises from the Renaissance, of which the Lobkowitz library possessed copies.

In a letter dated June 5, 1822, Beethoven called the Missa solemnis "his greatest work".

=== Performance history ===
The first performance took place in a secular setting, at the Philharmonic Society in Saint Petersburg, on the initiative of the Russian nobleman and patron Nikolai Golitsyn, on 7 April 1824 (March 26 Old Style). The premiere was originally planned for Christmas 1823; it was delayed by rehearsing the demanding choral parts, which proved to be unexpectedly time-consuming, and also by incorrectly copied parts. The conductor of the premiere on 7 April 1824 is unknown.

Parts of the mass (Kyrie, Credo, Agnus Dei) were performed on 7 May 1824, under the direction of Kapellmeister Michael Umlauf at the Kärntnertor Theater in Vienna, together with the overture The Consecration of the House and the premiere of Symphony No. 9. The three performed movements of the mass were designated as "hymns", because the Viennese censorship authorities objected to the performance of mass settings in a secular venue.

Another performance of the full mass took place in a liturgical setting in 1830, in the Church of St. Peter and Paul in the Bohemian town of Varnsdorf.

== Scoring and instrumentation ==
The mass is scored for a quartet of vocal soloists, a substantial chorus, and the full orchestra. Each element is used at times in virtuosic, textural, or melodic capacities. The full roster consists of 2 flutes; 2 oboes; 2 clarinets (in A, C, and B♭); 2 bassoons; contrabassoon; 4 horns (in D, E♭, B♭ basso, E, and G); 2 trumpets (D, B♭, and C); alto, tenor, and bass trombone; timpani; organ; strings (violins I and II, violas, cellos, and basses); soprano, alto, tenor, and bass soloists; and mixed choir.

== Structure ==
The Missa solemnis consists of five movements, corresponding to the first five sections of the Ordinary.

Note: In the "Scoring" column below, performers are indicated by the following abbreviations: "S" vocal soloists, "C" chorus, "O" orchestra. Additionally, "T" stands for the tenor soloist in 'Et homo factus est', and "V" the violinist in the Benedictus. In the "Note" column, the remarks in italics were written into the score by the composer.

No.	Movement	Bars	Incipit	Tempo	Bars	Scoring	Key	Meter	Note
1	Kyrie	224	Kyrie eleison	Assai sostenuto	86	SCO	D major	cut time	"Mit Andacht"
1	Kyrie	224	Christe eleison	Andante assai ben marcato	42	SCO	B minor	3/2	
1	Kyrie	224	Kyrie eleison	Tempo I	96	SCO	D major	cut time	
2	Gloria	569	Gloria in excelsis Deo	Allegro vivace	130	CO	D major	3/4	Gloria theme
2	Gloria	569	Gratias agimus tibi	Meno Allegro	43	SCO	B♭ major	3/4	
2	Gloria	569	Domine Deus	Tempo I	56	SCO	B♭ major, F major	3/4	Gloria theme
2	Gloria	569	Qui tollis peccata mundi	Larghetto	80	SCO	D minor, D major, B♭ major, D major	2/4	
2	Gloria	569	Quoniam tu solus Sanctus	Allegro maestoso	50	CO	D major	3/4	
2	Gloria	569	In gloria Dei Patris. Amen	Allegro, ma non troppo e ben marcato	99	SCO	D major	common time	Fugue
2	Gloria	569	In gloria Dei Patris. Amen	Poco piu Allegro	66	SCO	D major	cut time	Fugue
2	Gloria	569	In gloria Dei Patris. Amen	Presto	45	CO	D major	3/4	Reprise of 'Gloria in excelsis Deo'
3	Credo	473	Credo in unum Deum	Allegro ma non troppo	124	CO	B♭ major	common time	Credo theme
3	Credo	473	Et incarnatus est	Adagio	20	SCO	D Dorian	common time	
3	Credo	473	Et homo factus est	Andante	12	TCO	D major	3/4	Tenor solo
3	Credo	473	Crucifixus etiam pro nobis	Adagio espressivo	32	SCO	D minor	3/4	
3	Credo	473	Et resurrexit tertia die	Allegro	6	C	G Mixolydian	common time	A cappella chorus
3	Credo	473	Et ascendit in coelum	Allegro molto	70	CO	F major	cut time	
3	Credo	473	Credo in Spiritum Sanctum	Allegro ma non troppo	42	CO	F major	common time	Credo theme
3	Credo	473	Et vitam venturi... Amen	Allegretto ma non troppo	67	CO	B♭ major	3/2	Double fugue
3	Credo	473	Et vitam venturi... Amen	Allegro con moto	60	CO	B♭ major	3/2	Double fugue
3	Credo	473	Et vitam venturi... Amen	Grave	40	SCO	B♭ major	3/2	
4	Sanctus	235	Sanctus, Sanctus, Sanctus	Adagio	33	SO	D major	2/4	"Mit Andacht"
4	Sanctus	235	Pleni sunt coeli	Allegro pesante	19	SO	D major	common time	Fugue
4	Sanctus	235	Osanna in excelsis	Presto	27	SO	D major	3/4	
4	Sanctus	235	-	Sostenuto ma non troppo	32	O	G major	3/4	"Praeludium"
4	Sanctus	235	Benedictus qui venit	Andante molto cantabile e non troppo mosso	124	SCVO	G major, C major, G major	12/8	Violin solo
5	Agnus Dei	434	Agnus Dei	Adagio	95	SCO	B minor	common time	
5	Agnus Dei	434	Dona nobis pacem	Allegretto vivace	68	SCO	D major	6/8	"Bitte um innern und äussern Frieden"
5	Agnus Dei	434	Dona nobis pacem	Allegro assai	26	SCO	B♭ major	common time	Martial episode 1
5	Agnus Dei	434	Dona nobis pacem	Tempo I	76	SCO	F major, D major	6/8	Handel's Messiah citation: "And he shall reign"
5	Agnus Dei	434	Dona nobis pacem	Presto	88	SCO	D major, B♭ major	cut time	Martial episode 2
5	Agnus Dei	434	Dona nobis pacem	Tempo I	81	SCO	B♭ major, D major	6/8	

Duration: a performance of the complete work runs between 70 and 80 minutes.

== Analysis ==
The writing displays Beethoven's characteristic disregard for the performer; this writing is in several places both technically and physically exacting, with sudden changes of dynamic, metre and tempo. This approach is consistent throughout, starting with the opening Kyrie, where the syllables Ky-ri are delivered either forte or with sforzando, but the final e is piano. As noted below, the reprise of the Et vitam venturi fugue is particularly taxing, being both subtly different from previous statements of the theme and counter-theme, and delivered at approximately twice the speed. The orchestral parts also include many demanding sections, including the violin solo in the Sanctus and some of the most demanding work in the repertoire for bassoon and contrabassoon. The difficulty of the piece—together with the requirements for a full orchestra, large chorus, and highly trained soloists (both vocal and instrumental)—causes it to be rarely performed by amateur or semi-professional ensembles.

=== Kyrie ===
Perhaps the most traditional movement, the Kyrie has a traditional ABA′ structure. The grand opening, with a motif of three D-major chords, contrasts sharply with the fourth pianissimo response: (GOD/man) followed by quiet, stately, choral writing in the first section and more contrapuntal vocal textures in the Christe section. The four (SATB) vocal soloists and chorus share the thematic material throughout dialoguing in antiphony, the soloists particularly in the Christe Eleison section. The Kyrie is closed by a plagal-tending coda.

=== Gloria ===
Quickly shifting textures and themes highlight each portion of the Gloria text, as a beginning for the movement that is almost encyclopedic in its exploration of 3/4 time. The movement ends with the first of the work's two major fugues, on the text "In gloria Dei patris. Amen": at first rigid in tonality and metre, the fugue, which is progressively enriched by a choral cantus firmus bass and plagal cadences, disintegrates into three frustrated attempts at contrapuntal order that lead to two codas; this finally leads into a recapitulation of the initial Gloria text and music.

=== Credo ===
The form of the Credo may be divided into four parts:

1. 'Credo in unum Deum' through 'descendit de coelis' in B♭
2. 'Et incarnatus est' through 'Resurrexit' in D
3. 'Et ascendit' through the Credo recapitulation in F
4. Fugue and coda 'Et vitam venturi saeculi. Amen' in B♭.

The movement opens with a chord sequence that will be used later in the movement to effect modulation. The word "Credo" is sung repeatedly in a two-note motif; the work thereby joins a tradition of so-called "Credo Masses", including Wolfgang Amadeus Mozart's Missa brevis in F major, K. 192 and Mass in C major, K. 257 "Credo". The Credo, like the Gloria, is an often disorienting, hectic rush through the text. The "Et incarnatus" is a hymn-aria embedded in archaic and austere Dorian polyphony, which is filled with paradisal trills. The poignant modal harmonies of the "Et incarnatus" yield to increasingly expressive heights through the Crucifixus, and then into a remarkable a cappella setting of the "Et resurrexit". Most notable about the movement is the closing double fugue on "Et vitam venturi saeculi", which includes one of the most difficult passages in the choral repertoire, when the subject returns at doubled tempo for a stirring conclusion.

=== Sanctus ===
Until the Benedictus of the Sanctus, the Missa solemnis has fairly typical classical proportions. But after an orchestral preludio, a solo violin enters in its highest range—representing the Holy Spirit descending to earth in a remarkably long extension of the text. This music is markedly slow, close-textured and chromatic, recalling the improvised pieces for organ created specifically for the Elevation of the Host rite by composers such as Girolamo Frescobaldi or the French organ school members.

=== Agnus Dei ===
The movement begins with a setting of the plea "miserere nobis" ("have mercy on us") in B minor for male voices only; this section eventually yields to a bright D-major prayer, "dona nobis pacem" ("grant us peace"), in pastoral mode. After fugal development, the movement is dramatically interrupted by martial sounds; such interruption was a convention in the 18th century, e.g., in Haydn's Missa in tempore belli. However, after repeated pleas of "miserere", the movement eventually recovers equilibrium and draws to a conclusion.

== Critical reception ==
Some critics have been troubled, as Theodor W. Adorno wrote, that "there is something peculiar about the Missa solemnis." In many ways it is an atypical work: it lacks the sustained thematic development that is one of Beethoven's hallmarks. The fugues at the end of the Gloria and Credo align the mass with work from his late period—but his simultaneous interest in the theme and variations form is absent. Instead, the Missa presents a continuous musical narrative, almost without repetition, particularly in the Gloria and Credo (the two longest movements). The style, Adorno noted, resembles the treatment of themes in imitation that one finds in Franco-Flemish masters such as Josquin des Prez and Johannes Ockeghem; but it is unclear whether Beethoven was consciously imitating their techniques to meet the demands of the Mass text.

Donald Tovey has connected Beethoven to the earlier tradition in a different way:

Not even Bach or Handel can show a greater sense of space and of sonority. There is no earlier choral writing that comes so near to recovering some of the lost secrets of the style of Palestrina. There is no choral and no orchestral writing, earlier or later, that shows a more thrilling sense of the individual colour of every chord, every position, and every doubled third or discord.

Michael Spitzer presents an alternative view of the historical context of Beethoven's mass composition:

Gregorian melodies, of course, continued to be used in the Mass throughout the eighteenth century; but by Beethoven's time they were relatively rare, especially in orchestral Masses. The one composer who still used them extensively is Michael Haydn, in his a cappella Masses for Advent and Lent. It is significant that in some of these he limits the borrowed melody to the Incarnatus and expressly labels it "Corale." In the Missa dolorum B. M. V. (1762) it is set in the style of a harmonized chorale, in the Missa tempore Quadragesimae of 1794 note against note, with the Gregorian melody (Credo IV of the Liber Usualis) appearing in the soprano. I have little doubt that Beethoven knew such works of Michael Haydn, at that time the most popular composer of sacred music in Austria.

Maynard Solomon has written about Beethoven's influences and compositional method:

Beethoven's musical archaisms and reminiscences—Dorian and Mixolydian modes, Gregorian "fossils", quotations from Handel's Messiah in the Gloria and Agnus Dei—and his employment of procedures and musical imagery derived from older liturgical styles are, in context, modernistic devices that also serve to stretch the expressiveness of his music beyond the boundaries set for liturgical music by his contemporaries.

== Recordings ==
=== Audio ===
Year	Conductor	Orchestra and choir	Soloists	Label
1927	Lluís Millet	Orfeo Catala	Fornells, Callao, Brunig, Forgas	Victor Album M-29
1928	Bruno Kittel	Berliner Philharmoniker, Bruno-Kittel-Chor	Lotte Leonard/Emmy Land, Elenor Schlosshauer-Reynolds, Anton Maria Topitz/Eugen Transky, Wilhelm Guttmann/Hermann Schey	Polydor
1935	Arturo Toscanini	New York Philharmonic, New York Schola Cantorum	Elisabeth Rethberg, Marion Telva, Giovanni Martinelli, Ezio Pinza	Archipel
1937	Thomas Beecham	London Philharmonic Orchestra, Leeds Festival Chorus	Isobel Baillie, Mary Jarred, Heddle Nash, Keith Falkner	EMI
1938	Sergey Koussevitzky	Boston Symphony, Radcliffe Choral Society, Harvard Glee Club	Jeanette Vreeland, Anna Kaskas, John Priebe, Norman Cordon	RCA
1939	Arturo Toscanini	BBC Symphony Orchestra; BBC Choral Society	Zinka Milanov, Kerstin Thorborg, Koloman von Pataky, Nicola Moscona	Archipel
1940	Clemens Krauss	Chor und Orchester der Wiener Staatsoper	Trude Eipperle, Luise Willer, Julius Patzak, Georg Hann	Archipel
1940	Arturo Toscanini	NBC Symphony Orchestra, Westminster Choir	Zinka Milanov, Bruna Castagna, Jussi Björling, Alexander Kipnis	Music & Arts
1946	Erich Kleiber	Teatro Colón Orchestra and Chorus	Nilda Hoffmann, Mafalda Rinaldi, Lydia Kindermann, Kolomon von Pataky	Archipel
1948	Bruno Walter	New York Philharmonic Orchestra, Westminster Choir	Eleanor Steber, Nan Merriman, Walter Hain, Lorenzo Alvary	Music & Arts
1948	Erich Kleiber	Stockholm Philharmonic Orchestra and Chorus	Birgit Nilsson, Lisa Tunnel, Gosta Backlein, Sigurd Björling	Music & Arts
1950	Otto Klemperer	Wiener Symphoniker, Akademiechor Wien	Ilona Steingruber, Elsa Schürhoff, Ernst Maykut, Otto Wiener	Vox
1953	Arturo Toscanini	NBC Symphony Orchestra, Robert Shaw Chorale	Lois Marshall, Nan Merriman, Eugene Conley, Jerome Hines	RCA
1955	Otto Klemperer	Kölner Rundfunk-Sinfonie-Orchester, Kölner Rundfunkchor, Chor des Norddeutschen Rundfunks	Annelies Kupper, Sieglinde Wagner, Rudolf Schock, Josef Greindl	Archiphon
1955	Karl Böhm	Berliner Philharmoniker, Chor der St. Hedwigs-Kathedrale	Maria Stader, Marianna Radev, Anton Dermota, Josef Greindl	Deutsche Grammophon
1955	Volkmar Andrae	Wiener Symphoniker, Wiener Singverein	Teresa Stich-Randall, Hilde Rössel-Majdan, Julius Patzak, Gottlob Frick	Archipel
1957	Carl Schuricht	Nordwestdeutsche Philharmonie, Chor der St. Hedwigs-Kathedrale	Maria Stader, Elsa Cavelti, Ernst Haefliger, Heinz Rehfuss	Archiphon
1957	Otto Klemperer	Concertgebouworkest, Toonkunstkoor Amsterdam, Collegium Musicum Amstelodamense	Elisabeth Schwarzkopf, Nan Merriman, József Simándy, Heinz Rehfuss	Archipel
1958	Jascha Horenstein	Philharmonia Orchestra, Leeds Festival Chorus	Teresa Stich-Randall, Norma Procter, Peter Pears, Kim Borg	Pristine Audio
1959	Herbert von Karajan	Wiener Philharmoniker, Wiener Singverein	Leontyne Price, Christa Ludwig, Nicolai Gedda, Nicola Zaccaria	EMI
1960	Leonard Bernstein	New York Philharmonic Orchestra, Westminster Choir	Eileen Farrell, Carol Smith, Richard Lewis, Kim Borg	Columbia
1960	Herbert von Karajan	Philharmonia Orchestra; Wiener Singverein	Elisabeth Schwarzkopf, Christa Ludwig, Nicolai Gedda, Nicola Zaccaria	Testament
1961	Jascha Horenstein	BBC Symphony Orchestra, BBC Chorus	Teresa Stich-Randall, Norma Procter, Richard Lewis, Kim Borg	BBC Legends
1963	Günter Wand	Gürzenich-Orchester Köln, Gürzenich-Chor	Leonore Kirchstein, Jeanne Deroubaix, Peter Schreier, Günther Morbach	Nonesuch, Testament
1965	Otto Klemperer	New Philharmonia Orchestra & Chorus	Elisabeth Söderström, Marga Höffgen, Waldemar Kmentt, Martti Talvela	EMI
1966	Herbert von Karajan	Berliner Philharmoniker, Wiener Singverein	Gundula Janowitz, Christa Ludwig, Fritz Wunderlich, Walter Berry	Deutsche Grammophon
1967	Eugene Ormandy	Philadelphia Orchestra, Singing City Choirs	Martina Arroyo, Maureen Forrester, Richard Lewis, Cesare Siepi	Columbia
1967	George Szell	Cleveland Orchestra & Chorus	Saramae Endich, Florence Kopleff, Ernst Haefliger, Ezio Flagello	Urania
1970	Eugen Jochum	Concertgebouw Orchestra, Netherlands Radio Chorus	Agnes Giebel, Marga Höffgen, Ernst Haefliger, Karl Ridderbusch	Philips
1973	William Steinberg	Kölner Rundfunk-Sinfonie-Orchester, Kölner Rundfunkchor	Heather Harper, Julia Hamari, Sven Olof Eliasson, Peter Meven	ICA Classics
1974	Karl Böhm	Wiener Philharmoniker, Konzertvereinigung Wiener Staatsopernchor	Margaret Price, Christa Ludwig, Wiesław Ochman, Martti Talvela	Deutsche Grammophon
1975	Herbert von Karajan	Berliner Philharmoniker, Wiener Singverein	Gundula Janowitz, Agnes Baltsa, Peter Schreier, José van Dam	EMI
1975	Carlo Maria Giulini	London Philharmonic Orchestra; New Philharmonia Chorus	Heather Harper, Janet Baker, Robert Tear, Hans Sotin	EMI
1977	Rafael Kubelík	Chor und Symphonieorchester des Bayrischen Rundfunks	Helen Donath, Brigitte Fassbaender, Peter Schreier, John Shirley-Quirk	Orfeo
1977	Colin Davis	London Symphony Orchestra & Chorus	Anna Tomova-Sintow, Patricia Payne, Robert Tear, Robert Lloyd	Philips
1978	Georg Solti	Chicago Symphony Orchestra & Chorus	Lucia Popp, Yvonne Minton, Mallory Walker, Gwynne Howell	Decca
1978	Leonard Bernstein	Concertgebouw Orchestra, Radio Chorus of the NOS, Hilversum	Edda Moser, Anna Schwarz, René Kollo, Kurt Moll	Deutsche Grammophon
1982	Georg Solti	London Philharmonic Orchestra, Edinburgh Festival Chorus	Helen Donath, Doris Soffel, Siegfried Jerusalem, Hans Sotin	LPO
1985	Herbert von Karajan	Berliner Philharmoniker, Wiener Singverein	Lella Cuberli, Trudeliese Schmidt, Vinson Cole, José van Dam	Deutsche Grammophon
1985	Michael Gielen	ORF Radio-Symphonieorchester Wien, Wiener Singverein	Alison Hargan, Marjana Lipovšek, Thomas Moser, Matthias Hölle	Orfeo
1987	Michael Gielen	SWF-Sinfonieorchester Baden-Baden, Prague Philharmonic Choir	Phyllis Bryn-Julson, Marjana Lipovšek, Josef Protschka, Kurt Rydl	Intercord/Aurophon
1987	Terje Kvam	The Hanover Band, Oslo Cathedral Choir	Marianne Hirsti, Carolyn Watkinson, Andrew Murgatroyd, Michael George	Nimbus
1988	Antal Doráti	European Symphony Orchestra, University of Maryland Chorus	Tina Kiberg, Rosemarie Lang, William Cochran, Mikhail Krutikov	BIS
1988	Antal Doráti	European Symphony Orchestra, University of Maryland Chorus	Barbara Martig-Tüller, Rosemarie Lang, William Cochran, Thomas Brandis	Melodiya
1988	Robert Shaw	Atlanta Symphony Orchestra & Chorus	Sylvia McNair, Janice Taylor; John Aler, Tom Krause	Telarc
1989	John Eliot Gardiner	Orchestre Révolutionnaire et Romantique; Monteverdi Choir	Charlotte Margiono, Catherine Robbin, William Kendall, Alastair Miles	Archiv Produktion
1989	Helmuth Rilling	Bach-Collegium Stuttgart, Gächinger Kantorei Stuttgart	Pamela Coburn, Florence Quivar, Aldo Baldin, Andreas Schmidt	Hänssler
1990	Jeffrey Tate	English Chamber Orchestra, Tallis Chamber Choir	Carol Vaness, Waltraud Meier, Hans Peter Blochwitz, Hans Tschammer	EMI
1991	Daniel Barenboim	Chicago Symphony Orchestra & Chorus	Tina Kiberg, Waltraud Meier; John Aler, Robert Holl	Erato
1991	James Levine	Wiener Philharmoniker, Leipziger Rundfunkchor, Swedish Radio Choir, Eric Ericson Chamber Choir	Cheryl Studer, Jessye Norman, Plácido Domingo, Kurt Moll	Deutsche Grammophon
1992	Nikolaus Harnoncourt	Chamber Orchestra of Europe, Arnold Schoenberg Chor	Eva Mei, Marjana Lipovšek, Anthony Rolfe Johnson, Robert Holl	Teldec
1993	Rudolf Barshai	Russian National Orchestra, Sveshnikov Male Choir, Moscow Radio Children's Choir	Ursula Fiedler, Barbara Hölzl, Werner Hollweg, Jakob Stämpfli	Capriole
1994	Georg Solti	Berliner Philharmoniker; Rundfunkchor Berlin	Júlia Várady, Iris Vermillion, Vinson Cole, René Pape	Decca
1996	Kurt Masur	Gewandhausorchester Leipzig, Rundfunkchor Leipzig	Anna Tomowa-Sintow, Annalies Burmeister, Peter Schreier, Hermann Christian Polster	Berlin Classics
2001	David Zinman	Tonhalle Orchester Zürich, Schweizer Kammerchor	L'uba Orgonášová, Anna Larsson, Rainer Trost, Franz-Josef Selig	Arte Nova
2001	Roger Norrington	Radio-Sinfonieorchester Stuttgart des SWR, NDR-Chor, SWR Vokalensemble	Amanda Halgrimson, Cornelia Kallisch, John Aler, Alastair Miles	Hänssler
2002	Philippe Herreweghe	Orchestre des Champs-Élysées, Collegium Vocale Gent; La Chapelle Royale	Rosa Mannion, Birgit Remmert, James Taylor, Cornelius Hauptmann	Harmonia Mundi
2002	Marc Soustrot	Beethoven Orchester Bonn, Czech Philharmonic Choir Brno	Hillevi Martinpelto, Elena Zaremba, Herbert Lippert, Ronnie Johansen	MDG
2003	Kenneth Schermerhorn	Nashville Symphony Orchestra and Chorus	Lori Phillips, Robynne Redmon, James Taylor, Jay Baylon	Naxos
2006	Colin Davis	Symphonieorchester und Chor des Bayrischen Rundfunks	L'uba Orgonášová, Jadwiga Rappé, Uwe Hellmann, Jan-Hendrik Rootering	RCA
2007	Gustav Kuhn	Bolzano-Trento Haydn Orchestra, Chorus Academy of the Tyrolean Festival	Ingrid Kaiserfeld, Hermine Haselböck, Wolfram Wittekind, Liang Li	Col Legno
2008	Valentin Radu	Ama Deus Ensemble	Sarah Davis, Jody Kidwell, Timothy Bentch, Ed Bara	Lyrichord
2010	Alan Gilbert	New York Philharmonic Orchestra, New York Choral Artists	Christine Brewer, Jane Henschel, Anthony Dean Griffey, Eric Owens	NY Philharmonic
2010	Enoch zu Guttenberg	Orchester und Kammerchor der KlangVerwaltung	Susanne Bernhard, Anke Vondung, Pavol Breslik, Yorck Felix Speer	Farao Classics
2011	Charles Mackerras	Sydney Symphony Orchestra, Sydney Philharmonia Choir	Rosamund Illing, Elizabeth Campbell, Christopher Doig, Rodney Macann	ABC Classics
2012	Herbert Blomstedt	Gewandhausorchester, MDR Rundfunkchor	Simone Schneider, Gerhild Romberger, Richard Croft, Jochen Kupfer	Querstand
2012	Christoph Eschenbach	London Philharmonic Orchestra and Choir	Anne Schwanewilms, Annette Jahns, Nikolai Schukoff, Dietrich Henschel	LPO
2012	Philippe Herreweghe	Orchestre des Champs-Élysées, Collegium Vocale Gent	Marlis Petersen, Gerhild Romberger, Benjamin Hulett, David Wilson-Johnson	PHI
2012	John Eliot Gardiner	Orchestre Révolutionnaire et Romantique, Monteverdi Choir	Lucy Crowe, Jennifer Johnston, James Gilchrist, Matthew Rose	SDG
2014	Bernard Haitink	Symphonieorchester und Chor des Bayerischen Rundfunks	Genia Kühlmeier, Elisabeth Kulman, Mark Padmore, Hanno Müller-Brachmann	BR Klassik
2015	Nikolaus Harnoncourt	Concentus Musicus Wien, Arnold Schoenberg Chor	Laura Aikin, Bernarda Fink, Johannes Chum, Ruben Drole	Sony
2016	Daniel Reuss	Orchestra of the Eighteenth Century, Cappella Amsterdam	Carolyn Sampson, Marianne Beate Kielland, Thomas Walker, David Wilson-Johnson	Glossa
2017	Marek Janowski	Rundfunk-Sinfonieorchester Berlin, MDR Rundfunkchor Leipzig	Regine Hangler, Elisabeth Kulman, Christian Elsner, Franz-Josef Selig	Pentatone
2018	Masaaki Suzuki	Bach Collegium Japan	Ann-Helen Moen, Roxana Constantinescu, James Gilchrist, Benjamin Bevan	BIS
2019	Frieder Bernius	Hofkapelle Stuttgart, Kammerchor Stuttgart	Johanna Winkel, Sophie Harmsen, Sebastian Kohlhepp, Arttu Kataja	Carus
2021	René Jacobs	Freiburger Barockorchester, RIAS Kammerchor	Polina Pasztircsák, Sophie Harmsen, Steve Davislim, Johannes Weisser	Harmonia Mundi
2023	Jordi Savall	Le Concert des Nations, La Capella Nacional de Catalunya	Lina Johnson, Olivia Vermeulen, Martin Platz, Manuel Walser	AliaVox

=== Video ===
Year	Conductor	Orchestra and choir	Soloists	Label
1977	Rafael Kubelík	Chor und Symphonieorchester des Bayrischen Rundfunks	Helen Donath, Brigitte Fassbänder, Peter Schreier, John Shirley-Quirk	
1978	Leonard Bernstein	Concertgebouw Orchestra, Radio Chorus of the NOS Hilversum	Edda Moser, Anna Schwarz, René Kollo, Kurt Moll	
1979	Herbert von Karajan	Berliner Philharmoniker, Wiener Singverein	Anna Tomowa-Sintow, Ruža Baldani, Éric Tappy, José van Dam	Deutsche Grammophon
1994	John Eliot Gardiner	Sinfonieorchester und Chor des Norddeutschen Rundfunks, Monteverdi Choir	L'uba Orgonášová, Catherine Robbin, Anthony Rolfe Johnson, Alastair Miles	ZDF
2005	Fabio Luisi	Staatskapelle Dresden, Sächsischer Staatsopernchor Dresden	Camilla Nylund, Birgit Remmert, Christian Elsner, René Pape	EuroArts
2005	Gilbert Levine	Royal Philharmonic Orchestra, London Philharmonic Choir	Bozena Harasimowicz, Monica Groop, Jerry Hadley, Franz-Josef Selig	Arthaus Musik
2009	Jiří Bělohlávek	Prague Philharmonia, Brno Philharmonic Choir	Katarina Štúrová, Eva Garajova, Tomáš Černý, Gustav Belacek	
2009	Colin Davis	London Symphony Orchestra and Chorus, London Philharmonic Choir	Helena Juntunen, Sarah Connolly, Paul Groves, Matthew Rose	BBC
2014	John Eliot Gardiner	Orchestre Révolutionnaire et Romantique; Monteverdi Choir	Lucy Crowe, Jennifer Johnston, Michael Spyres, Mathew Rose	BBC
2014	Bernard Haitink	Symphonieorchester und Chor des Bayerischen Rundfunks	Genia Kühmeier, Elisabeth Kulman, Mark Padmore, Hanno Müller-Brachmann	BR Klassik
2016	Nikolaus Harnoncourt	Concertgebouw Orchestra, Netherlands Radio Choir	Marlis Petersen, Elisabeth Kulman, Werner Güra, Gerald Finley	C Major
2016	Andrés Orozco-Estrada	Sinfonie-Orchester des Hessischen Rundfunks, Wiener Singverein	Regine Hangler, Katrin Wundsam, Steve Davislim, Hanno Müller-Brachmann	
2016	Daniel Reuss	Orchestra of the Eighteenth Century, Cappella Amsterdam	Carolyn Sampson, Marianne Beate Kielland, Thomas Walker, David Wilson-Johnson	Avrotros/NPO
2019	Frieder Bernius	Hofkapelle Stuttgart, Kammerchor Stuttgart	Johanna Winkel, Sophie Harmsen, Sebastian Kohlhepp, Arttu Kataja	Naxos
2020	Christian Thielemann	Staatskapelle Dresden, Sächsischer Staatsopernchor Dresden	Krassimira Stoyanova, Elīna Garanča, Michael Schade, Franz-Josef Selig	C Major
2021	John Eliot Gardiner	Symphonieorchester und Chor des Bayerischen Rundfunks	Lucy Crowe, Gerhild Romberger, Julian Prégardien, Tareq Nazmi	
2021	Riccardo Muti	Wiener Philharmoniker, Konzertvereinigung Wiener Staatsopernchor	Rosa Feola, Alisa Kolosova, Dmitry Korchak, Ildar Abdrazakov	Unitel
2021	René Jacobs	Freiburger Barockorchester, RIAS Kammerchor	Polina Pasztircsák, Sophie Harmsen, Steve Davislim, Johannes Weisser	Mezzo
2022	Philippe Herreweghe	Orchestre des Champs-Élysées, Collegium Vocale Gent	Eleanor Lyons, Eva Zaïcik, Ilker Arcayürek, Hanno Müller-Brachmann	
