= Hélène (opera) =

Opera in one act by Camille Saint-Saëns

- Poème lyrique by Camille Saint-Saëns
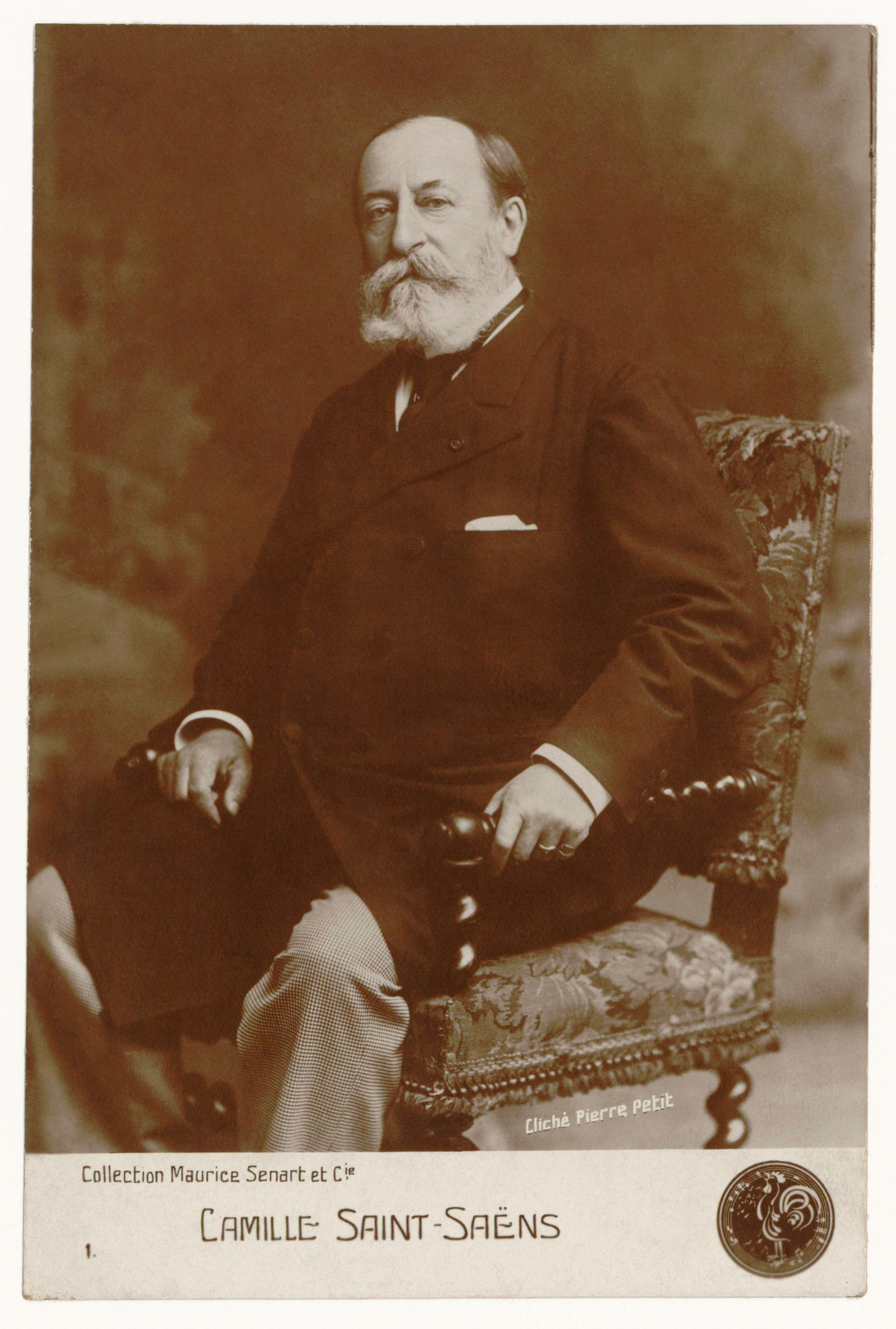
- The composer in 1900, photographed by Pierre Petit
- Librettist: Saint-Saëns
- Language: French
- Based on: Helen of Troy
- Premiere: 18 February 1904; Théâtre de Monte-Carlo

Hélène is a poème lyrique or opera in one act by composer Camille Saint-Saëns. It is the first opera for which Saint-Saëns wrote his own French libretto, which is based on the classic story of Helen of Troy and Paris from Greek mythology. The opera premiered at the Opéra de Monte-Carlo in Monaco on 18 February 1904. Moderately successful, the opera enjoyed a handful of revivals up through 1919, after which it fell out of the performance repertoire. The work was resurrected in 2008 for its world premiere recording by the Australian music label Melba.

== Performance history ==
Hélène is the first opera that Saint-Saëns composed for the opera house in Monte Carlo, which was led by enterprising director Raoul Gunsbourg at that time. At its premiere, the opera was presented in conjunction with Jules Massenet's veristic La Navarraise. The role of Hélène was sung by acclaimed soprano Nellie Melba, who had commissioned Saint-Saëns to write the opera specifically for her. The reviews of the premiere performance, though not rapturous, were generally positive. The opera was subsequently revived at the Opéra-Comique on 18 January 1905, with Mary Garden in the title role and in Monte Carlo again in 1909 and 1916. The Palais Garnier staged the work for the first time on 20 June 1919, with Marcelle Demougeot in the title role.

The opera then fell into obscurity until it was recorded for the first time in 2008 by the Belle Époque Chorus and Orchestra Victoria under conductor Guillaume Tourniaire.

== Textual and musical analysis ==
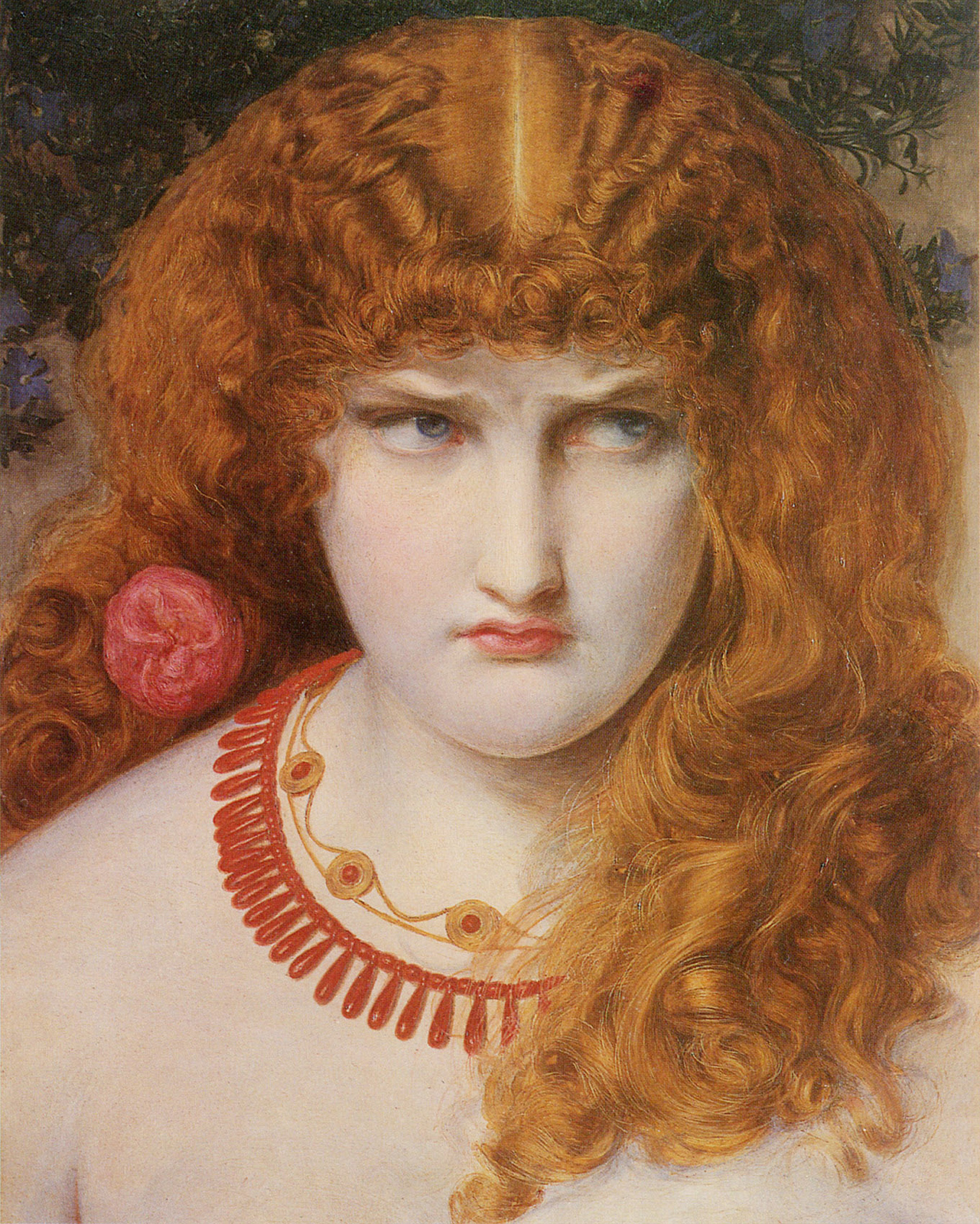
Helen of Troy (1867) by Frederick Sandys.

Prior to composing Hélène, Saint-Saëns had seen Offenbach's 1864 operetta on the same story, La belle Hélène, which he criticized for its trivial portrayal of ancient Greece and its "lax moral tone". Saint-Saëns wrote his own text in highly poetic rhyming verse, and divided the plot into seven scenes. Some of the opera's more colourful episodes include the second scene, where Helen, at the precipice of a large cliff, first implores Zeus to relieve her of her dilemma by striking her with thunderbolts and then contemplates suicide by throwing herself off the cliff into the sea; and Pallas's prophecy, which is full of gruesome bloody images of the coming Trojan War. Critics such as Hugo Shirley have accused the work of being too sentimental, proposing that Saint-Saëns's deliberate desire to distance himself from the vogue of verismo opera and the dramatic sensibilities of Richard Wagner may have prevented him from any kind operatic psychoanalysis. The result, according to Shirley, is that while Saint-Saëns had intended to create a serious portrait of Helen of Troy, the music made it "sound at times like a parody of nineteenth-century sentimentality".

== Roles ==
Role	Voice type	Premiere Cast, 18 February 1904
Hélène	soprano	Nellie Melba
Pâris	tenor	Albert Alvarez
Vénus	soprano	Henriette Blot
Pallas	contralto	Meyriane Héglon

== Synopsis ==
Paris, a Trojan prince, comes to Sparta to marry Helen, whom he had been promised by Venus after he had chosen her as the most beautiful of the goddesses, earning the wrath of Athena and Hera. Vénus tries to persuade Helen to abandon Menelaus for love. Meanwhile, Pallas warns Helen of the dreadful events that will ensue if she abandons Sparta for Troy. Helen heeds the words of Venus, not Pallas, and sets sail with Pâris in an ecstatic embrace.

== Recording ==
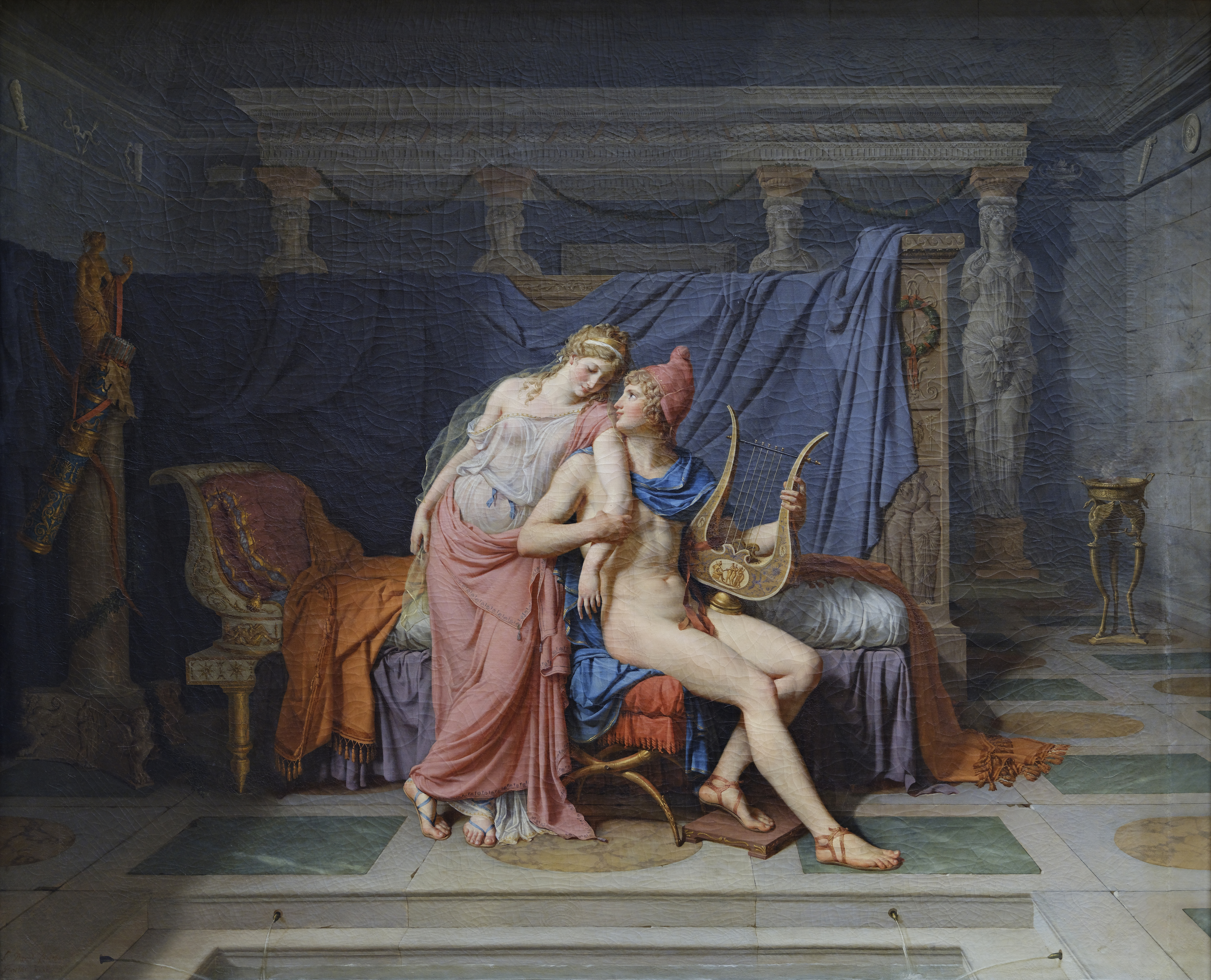
Paris and Helena (1788) by J.L. David.

Year	Cast (Hélène, Pâris, Vénus, Pallas)	Conductor, Chorus and Orchestra	Label
2008	Rosamund Illing; Steve Davislim; Leanne Kenneally; Zan McKendree-Wright	Guillaume Tourniaire; Belle Époque Chorus and the Orchestra Victoria	CD: Melba label Cat: MR301114-2
