= Jeanne Deroubaix =

Belgian mezzo-soprano and voice teacher (born 1927)

- Born: 15 February 1927 (age 99); Brussels, Belgium
- Occupations: Mezzo-soprano; Voice teacher

Jeanne Deroubaix (born 15 February 1927) is a Belgian mezzo-soprano, focused on concert performances of early music and contemporary music. She premiered music by Igor Stravinsky and collaborated with Pierre Boulez, first performing and recording his Le marteau sans maître.

== Career ==
Born in Brussels, Deroubaix studied voice in her hometown. She performed from 1947 to 1953 in the vocal ensemble for early music Pro Musica Antiqua, founded by Safford Cape, which toured to Germany, Italy and Spain. She was mostly active as a recitalist and oratorio singer. Her rare stage performances included Messagera and Ninfa (Nymph) in Monteverdi's L'Orfeo at the Théâtre de la Monnaie in Brussels. She was appointed professor of voice at the Musikhochschule Detmold in 1957.

On 23 September 1958, she was a soloist in the premiere of Stravinsky's cantata Threni in the hall of the Scuola Grande di San Rocco in Venice, with Ursula Zollenkopf, Hugues Cuénod, Richard Robinson, Charles Scharbach, Robert Oliver, the NDR Chor and NDR Sinfonieorchester, conducted by the composer. She appeared in concert at the BBC Proms in the Royal Albert Hall on 3 September 1968, singing Le marteau sans maître by Pierre Boulez, conducted by the composer.

Her recordings have included Brahms's Lieder and Monteverdi's L'Orfeo. She participated in the first recording of Le Marteau sans maître by Boulez, with flutist Severino Gazzelloni, percussionists Jean Batigne and Georges van Gucht, and vibraphonist Claude Ricou, conducted by the composer. She was a soloist in a recording of Debussy's Le Martyre de saint Sébastien, with Eva Maria Rogner, Marijana Radev, choir and orchestra of the Bavarian Radio, conducted by Boulez. The recording became part of Deutsche Grammophon's complete recordings of the composer's music, and a reviewer noted its "pioneering fervour".

Deroubaix recorded Beethoven's Missa solemnis with Günter Wand conducting chorus and orchestra of the Gürzenich in Cologne, alongside Leonore Kirschstein, Peter Schreier and Günther Morbach. She recorded Stravinsky's cantata A Sermon, a Narrative and a Prayer, again with tenor Cuénod, and choir and orchestra of the Bavarian Radio, conducted by Paul Sacher.
