= Orchestra Victoria =

- Orchestra
- Founded: 1969
- Website: https://www.orchestravictoria.com.au/about-us/history

Orchestra Victoria is a full-time salaried orchestra based in Melbourne, Australia, and wholly owned subsidiary of the Australian Ballet. Founded in 1969, the orchestra is now a principal performance partner for the Australian Ballet, Opera Australia, and larger productions of Victorian Opera.

== History ==
The orchestra was established in 1969 as the Elizabethan Trust Melbourne Orchestra, initially with just 32 players. Over the next decade, the orchestra expanded both its numbers and repertoire as it accompanied some of the world's leading performers, including Rudolf Nureyev and Dame Joan Sutherland, and worked with renowned conductors such as Richard Bonynge, Stuart Challender, Carlo Felice Cillario and John Lanchbery.

In 1986, the Victorian Arts Centre took over the Orchestra and changed its name to the State Orchestra of Victoria. Its initial management and artistic team: concertmaster: Anthony Conolan, administrator: Peter Narroway, orchestra manager: Kevin Morgan.

In 2001, the orchestra became an independent organisation named Orchestra Victoria. It then moved to what was known to be the Army Band Barracks in Albert Park.

On 1 July 2014, Orchestra Victoria became a wholly owned subsidiary of the Australian Ballet. Since then it has expanded activities, continued to perform with leading artists from around the world, revitalised its philanthropic program, appears in broadcasts, recordings and open-air events and toured interstate for the first time in many years.

At the end of 2016, the orchestra was forced to move out of its home in Albert Park to make way for a new primary school. In January 2023, it further relocated from Joan Hammond Hall in Southbank, Melbourne, to a site in North Melbourne to allow for the Melbourne Arts Precincts Transformation project to proceed.

== Activities ==
Performances:

- State Theatre, Arts Centre Melbourne for opera and ballet.
- The Melbourne Recital Centre in Melbourne, Australia.
- In concert venues across regional Victoria.
- Playing alongside students as part of its mOVe! education program.
- On recordings for ABC Classics and Melba Recordings

== Leading staff ==
- Executive director: Jacinta Ewers
- Concertmaster: Sulki Yu

== Discography ==
Title	Details
Ludwig Minkus, Don Quixote	John Lanchbery (conductor), The Elizabethan Trust Melbourne Orchestra. • Released: 1973 • Label: EMI • Cat #: CSD 3749
Ludwig Minkus/Arr. John Lanchbery. (LP, Vinyl)	John Lanchbery (conductor), The Elizabethan Trust Melbourne Orchestra. • Released: Sep, 1977 • Label: World Record Club • Cat #: R-03711
Giacomo Puccini, Madama Butterfly (CD)	State Orchestra of Victoria – John Lanchbery (conductor) • Released: 1996 • Label: ABC Classics • Cat #: 454 499-2
Albert Arlen, The Sentimental Bloke (CD)	John Lanchbery (conductor), Orchestra Victoria • Released: Jun, 1998 • Label: ABC Classics • Cat #: ABC4768366
Michael Easton, Concerto on Australian Themes, An Australian in Paris (CD)	State Orchestra of Victoria, Brett Kelly (conductor), Bernadette Conlon, Len Vorster, Margaret Haggart • Released: Jun, 1998 • Label: Naxos • Cat #: 8.554368
Franz Lehár, The Merry Widow (CD)	State Orchestra of Victoria, John Lanchbery (conductor) • Released: 1999 • Label: ABC Classics • Cat #: 465 426-2
Don Quixote (CD)	State Orchestra of Victoria • Released: 1999 • Label: Unknown • Cat #: 59567129 (Libraries Australia)
Graeme Koehne, 1914: ballet music. (CD)	Mark Sommerbell (conductor), State Orchestra of Victoria • Released: 1999 • Label: ABC Classics • Cat #: 4652092
Sean O'Boyle, Villean Sunrise, (CD)	Robert John (violin), State Orchestra of Victoria • Released: 2000 • Label: ABC Classics • Cat #: 465682-2
Constant Lambert The Bird Actors: Pomona; Romeo and Juliet. (CD)	John Lanchberry (conductor), State Orchestra of Victoria. • Released: 2000 (Colchester, Essex, England) • Label: Chandos • Cat #: CHAN9865
Various composers, Australia Unite! The road to federation: Songs and dances of colonial Australia. (CD)	Richard Divall (conductor), Merlyn Quaife (singer), John Bolton Wood (singer), State Orchestra of Victoria. • Released: 2001 • Label: ABC Classics • Cat #: 00028948141203
Ferdinand Hérold, La Somnambule (CD)	Richard Bonynge (conductor) • Released: 2008 • Label: Melba Records • Cat#: MR301087
Various composers, Villains: sinister songs and arias. (CD)	John Wegner (singer), Richard Divall (conductor), State Orchestra of Victoria. • Released: 2001 • Label: ABC Classics • Cat #: 00028948141272
Various composers, Dance of the Hours: Beautiful Music for Every House of the Day (CD)	Richard Divall (conductor) • Released: Oct, 2005 • Label: ABC Classics • Cat #: ABC4768366
Georges Bizet, Divergence (DVD)	State Orchestra of Victoria, The Australian Ballet, Stanton Welch (choreographer, Stephen Burstow (director/producer). • Released: 2007 • Label: West Long Branch, NJ: Kultur • Cat #: D4252
Camille Saint-Saëns, Hélène/Nuit Persane (CD)	Rosamund Illing, Steve Davislim, Leanne Kenneally, Zan Mckendree-Wright, Belle Époque Chorus Guillaume Tourniaire (conductor) • Released: 2008 • Label: Melba Records • Cat #: MR 301114-2
Richard Strauss, Seduction (CD)	State Orchestra of Victoria, Simone Young (conductor), Steve Davislim (tenor) • Released: 2008 • Label: Melba Records • Cat #: MR301108
Rhapsodie: Fantasie: Poème (CD)	Ben Jacks (horn), Orchestra Victoria, Queensland Symphony Orchestra, Barry Tuckwell (conductor) • Released: 2008 • Label: Melba Records • Cat #: MR301117
Franz Lehár/John Lanchbery, The Merry Widow: ballet music based on the Lehár opera (Lustige Witwe) arr. John Lanchbery. (CD)	Alan Abbott (conductor), State Orchestra of Victoria. • Released: 2009 • Label: Naxos Digital Services/ABC Classics • Cat #: ABC465426-2
Camille Saint-Saëns, ELAN (CD)	Orchestra Victoria, Guillaume Tourniaire (conductor) • Released: 2010 • Label: Melba Records • Cat #: MR301130
Giacomo Puccini, Puccini = Passion (CD)	Orchestra Victoria, Cheryl Barker (soprano), Richard Bonynge (conductor) • Released: Jan, 2011 • Label: Melba Records • Cat #: MR301110
The Australian Cities Suite (CD)	Orchestra Victoria with Judith Durham (singer) • Released: 2012 • Label: Decca • Cat #: 279 7918
Various composers, The Australian Ballet – The Music of Dance: Celebrating 50 Years. (CD)	State Orchestra of Victoria, Melbourne Symphony Orchestra, Tasmanian Symphony Orchestra, Sydney Symphony Orchestra, West Australian Symphony Orchestra, Adelaide Symphony Orchestra, Richard Mills, John Lanchbery, Werner Andreas Albert, Vladimir Verbitsky, Nicolette Fraillon, David Stanhope, John Hopkins, David Porcelijn (conductors) • Released: Jan 2012 • Label: ABC Classics • Cat #: 480 6403
Pyotr Ilyich Tchaikovsky, The Sleeping Beauty (CD)	Orchestra Victoria, Nicolette Fraillon (conductor), David Wenham • Released: 2015 • Label: ABC Classics • Cat #: 481 2234
Pyotr Ilyich Tchaikovsky, The Nutcracker (CD)	Orchestra Victoria, Nicolette Fraillon (conductor), Geoffrey Rush (narrator) • Released: Nov, 2016 • Label: ABC Classics • Cat #: 4814668
Léo Delibes, Coppélia (CD)	Orchestra Victoria, Barry Wordsworth (conductor) • Release: 2018 • Label: ABC Classics • Cat #: 481 7212

== Awards and nominations ==
=== AIR Awards ===
The Australian Independent Record Awards (commonly known informally as AIR Awards) is an annual awards night to recognise, promote and celebrate the success of Australia's Independent Music sector.

Year	Nominee / work	Award	Result	Ref.
2022	Live at Hamer Hall (with The Teskey Brothers)	Best Independent Blues and Roots Album or EP	Nominated	

=== ARIA Music Awards ===
The ARIA Music Awards is an annual awards ceremony that recognises excellence, innovation, and achievement across all genres of Australian music. They commenced in 1987.

Year	Nominee / work	Award	Result	Ref.
1999	Rudolf Nureyev's Don Quixote	Best Original Cast or Show Album	Nominated	
2000	The Merry Widow (with John Lanchbery)	Best Original Cast or Show Album	Nominated	
2022	Live at Hamer Hall (with The Teskey Brothers)	Best Blues and Roots Album	Nominated	
