= Zehdenick =

- Town
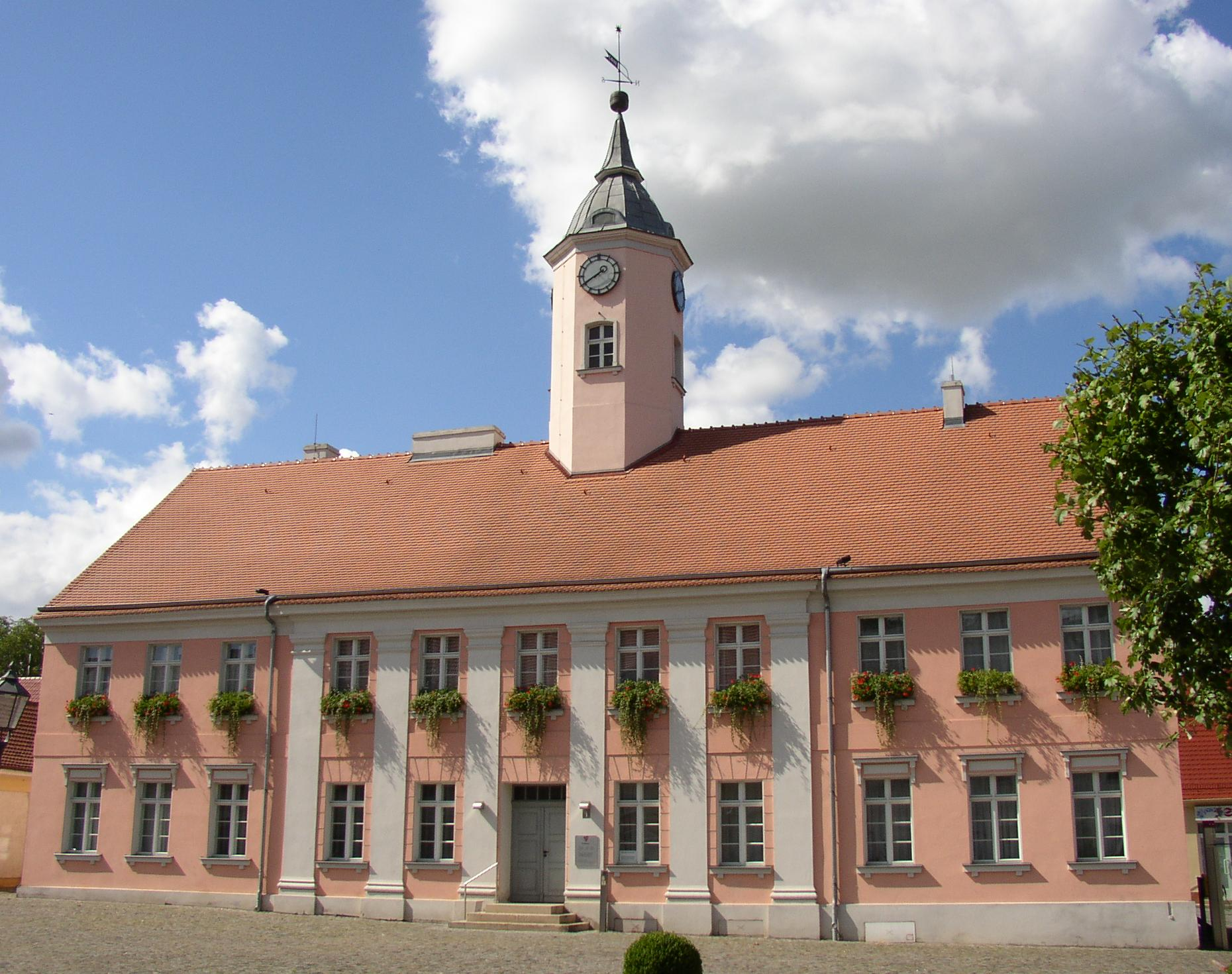
- Town hall

- Coat of arms

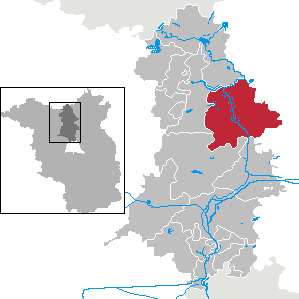
- Location of Zehdenick within Oberhavel district
- Interactive map of Zehdenick
- Location within Germany Location within Brandenburg
- Coordinates: 52°59′N 13°20′E
- Country: Germany
- State: Brandenburg
- District: Oberhavel

Government
  - Mayor (2022–30): Lucas Halle (SPD)

Area
  - Total: 223.06 km^{2} (86.12 sq mi)
- Elevation: 50 m (160 ft)

Population (2025-12-31)
  - Total: 12,875
  - Density: 57.720/km^{2} (149.49/sq mi)
- Time zone: UTC+01:00 (CET)
  - Summer (DST): UTC+02:00 (CEST)
- Postal codes: 16792
- Dialling codes: 03307
- Vehicle registration: OHV
- Website: www.zehdenick.de

Zehdenick (German pronunciation: [ˈtseːdənɪk]) is a town in the Oberhavel district, in Brandenburg, Germany. It is situated on the river Havel, 26 kilometres (16 miles) southeast of Fürstenberg/Havel, and 51 kilometres (32 miles) north of Berlin (centre). Since 31 July 2013, the city has the additional appellation "Havelstadt".

== Geography ==
Zehdenick is located about 60 km north of Berlin on the Havel. It forms the northern starting point of the natural region of the Zehdenick-Spandauer Havelniederung. East extends the Schorfheide-Chorin Biosphere Reserve. The urban area belongs mainly to the historical landscape Uckermark. The subdivisions Marienthal and Ribbeck pertain to the Ruppiner Land, Mildenberg and Zabelsdorf to the Land Löwenberg. Zehdenick has a share in the Naturschutzgebiet Kleine Schorfheide.

== Subdivision ==
The urban area of Zehdenick next to the core city Zehdenick includes 13 villages:

District	Inhabitants	In the municipality since
Badingen (with Neuhof and Osterne)	632	26 October 2003
Bergsdorf	427	31 December 2001
Burgwall	238	26 October 2003
Kappe	136	26 October 2003
Klein-Mutz	438	26 October 2003
Krewelin	281	26 October 2003
Kurtschlag	268	26 October 2003
Marienthal	428	26 October 2003
Mildenberg	707	26 October 2003
Ribbeck	135	31 December 2001
Vogelsang	79	31 December 2001
Wesendorf	249	26 October 2003
Zabelsdorf	242	26 October 2003

Besides these Ortsteile (districts), there are several smaller inhabited places: Amt Mildenberg, Ausbau (District Ribbeck), Ausbau (Core city Zehdenick), Bergluch, Boddin, Burgwaller Försterei, Deutschboden, Eichholz, Försterei Blockhaus, Großenhof, Hammelstall, Hellberge, Karlshof, Lüthkeshof, Mahnhorst, Mutzer Plan, Neuhof, Osterne, Revierförsterei Wolfsgarten, Rieckesthal, Siedlung II, Wolfsgarten, Ziegelei, Ziegelei Abbau and Ziegelei Ausbau.

== Demography ==
Development of Population since 1875 within the Current Boundaries (Blue Line: Population; Dotted Line: Comparison to Population Development of Brandenburg state; Dotted line: Comparison to population development of Brandenburg state
Grey background: Time of Nazi rule—Red background: Time of communist rule)

Recent Population Development and Projections (Population Development before Census 2011 (blue line); Recent Population Development according to the Census in Germany in 2011 (blue bordered line); Official projections for 2005-2030 (yellow line); for 2020-2030 (green line); for 2017-2030 (scarlet line)

Zehdenick: Population development
within the current boundaries (2013)

Year	Pop.	±% p.a.
1875	10,598	—
1890	12,293	+0.99%
1910	17,117	+1.67%
1925	17,337	+0.09%
1933	18,363	+0.72%
1939	20,247	+1.64%
1946	22,257	+1.36%
1950	22,723	+0.52%
1964	19,215	−1.19%
1971	19,248	+0.02%
1981	17,469	−0.97%
1985	17,413	−0.08%
1989	17,249	−0.24%
1990	16,980	−1.56%
1991	16,749	−1.36%

Year	Pop.	±% p.a.
1992	16,545	−1.22%
1993	16,321	−1.35%
1994	16,243	−0.48%
1995	16,077	−1.02%
1996	15,981	−0.60%
1997	15,752	−1.43%
1998	15,733	−0.12%
1999	15,594	−0.88%
2000	15,443	−0.97%
2001	15,206	−1.53%
2002	14,993	−1.40%
2003	14,903	−0.60%
2004	14,708	−1.31%
2005	14,607	−0.69%
2006	14,478	−0.88%

Year	Pop.	±% p.a.
2007	14,292	−1.28%
2008	14,090	−1.41%
2009	14,033	−0.40%
2010	13,830	−1.45%
2011	13,511	−2.31%
2012	13,471	−0.30%
2013	13,345	−0.94%
2014	13,325	−0.15%
2015	13,409	+0.63%
2016	13,463	+0.40%
2017	13,456	−0.05%
2018	13,437	−0.14%
2019	13,387	−0.37%
2020	13,307	−0.60%

== History ==
Zehdenick was first mentioned in documentary on 28 December 1216. Zehdenick was at that time a fishing town. Ascanians built a castle here to protect against Pomeranians and Danes.

As a city, Zehdenick was first denoted in 1281.

== Abbey ==
Zehdenick is the site of the former Cistercian nunnery, Zehdenick Abbey.

== Twin cities ==
Zehdenick is twinned with:

- Castrop-Rauxel, Germany
- Siemiatycze, Poland (since 10 March 2007)

== Notable residents ==
- Paul Georg von Möllendorff (1847–1901), German linguist and diplomat in East Asia
- Marianne Grunthal (1896–1945), teacher, victim of the SS
- Karl Frenzel (1911–1996), SS-Oberscharführer, participant in the Action T4 and section commander in Sobibor extermination camp
- Sebastian Mielitz (born 1989), soccer player
- Sten Nadolny (born 1942), writer
- Günther Morbach (1927–2009), classical bass
- Josefine Preuß (born 1986), actress

== Photogallery ==
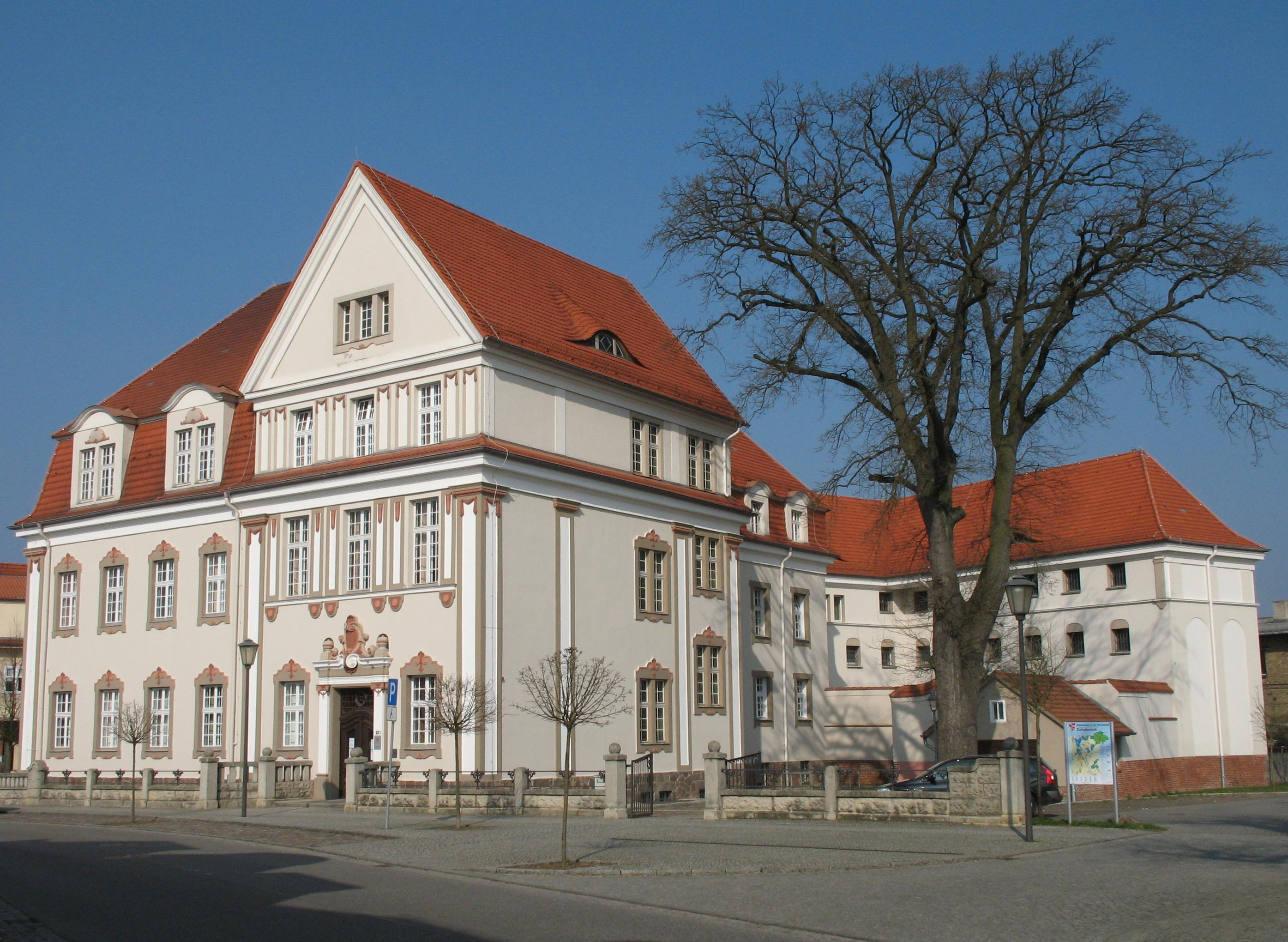
Amtsgericht

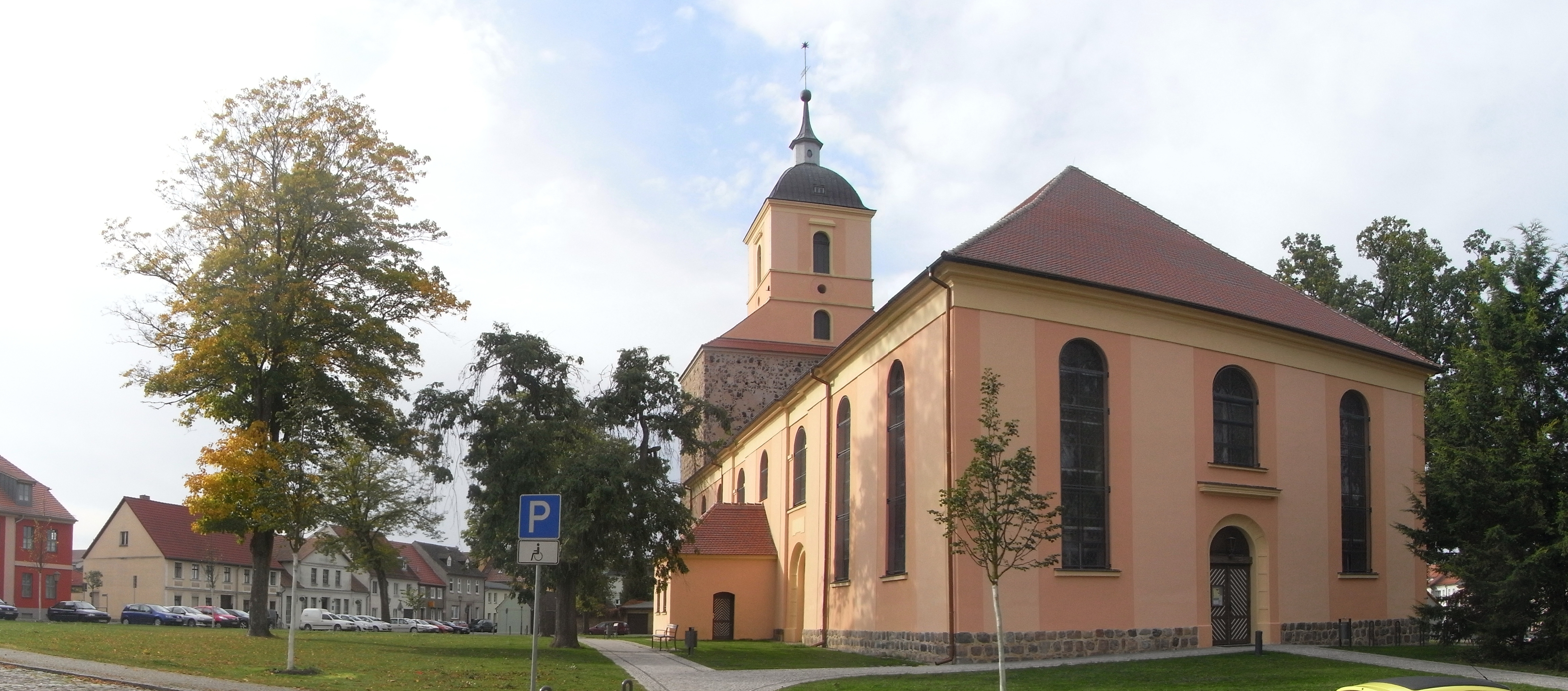
City church

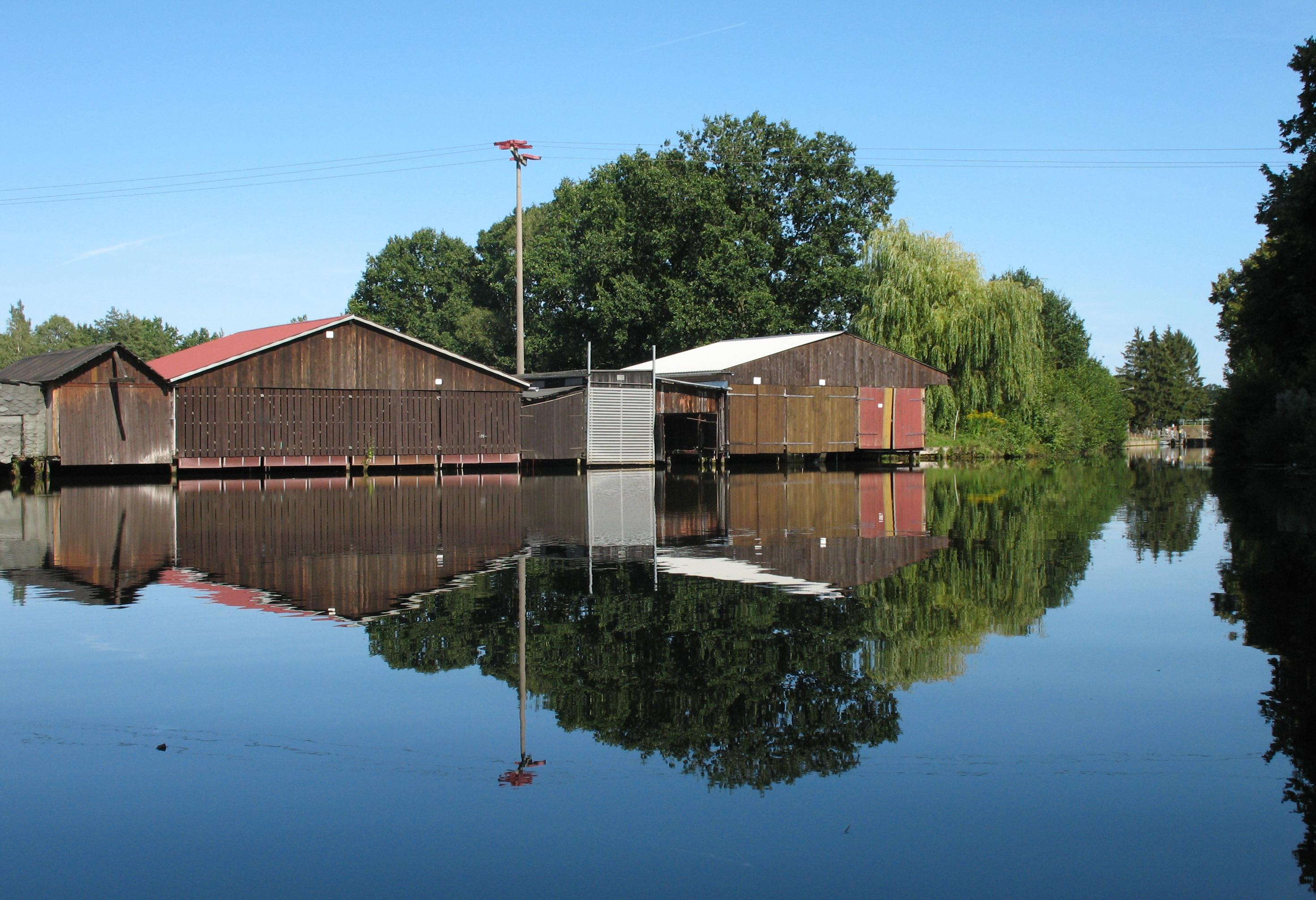
Wentow channel in Marienthal

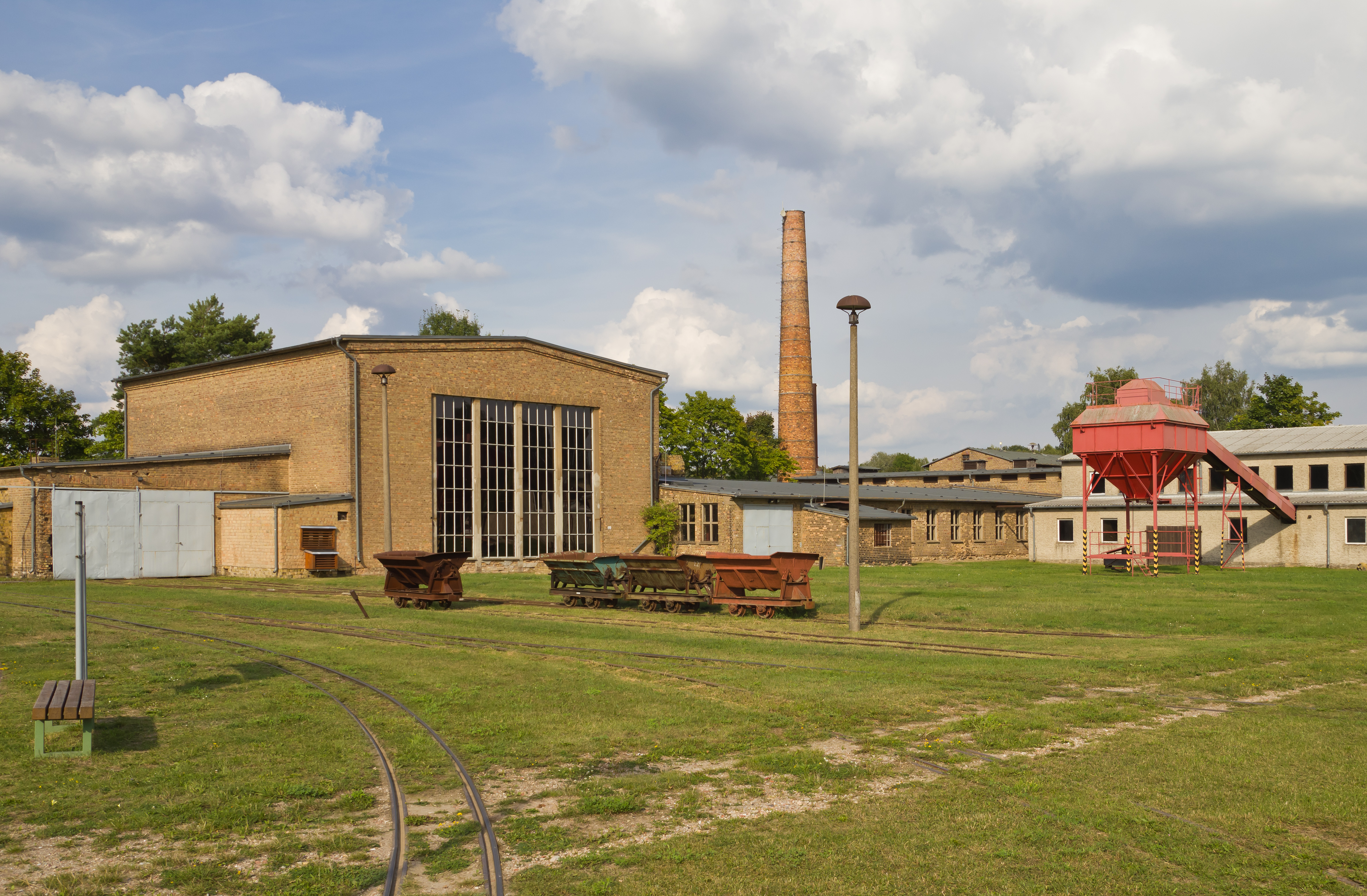
Former brickyard in Mildenberg
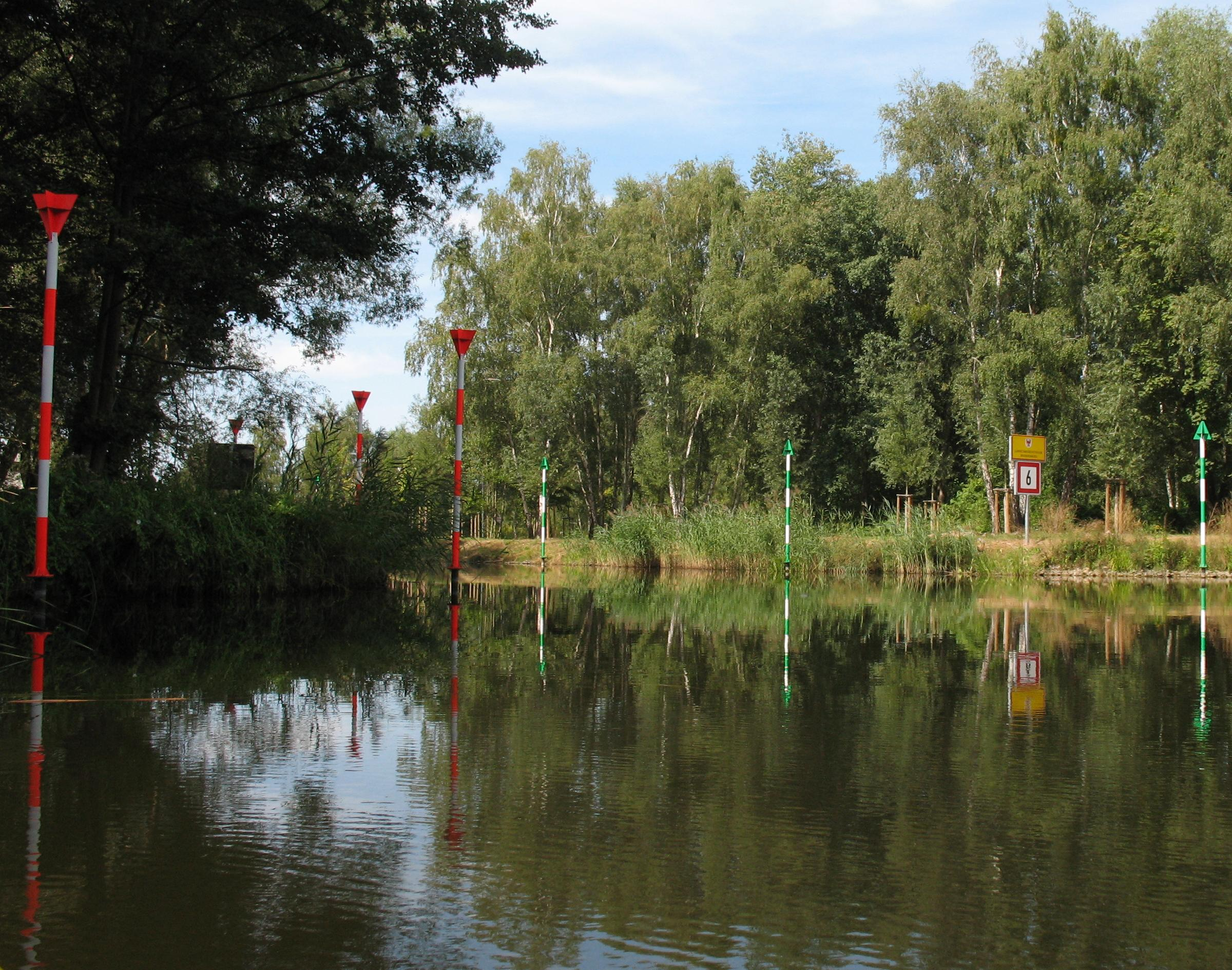
River Havel in Mildenberg

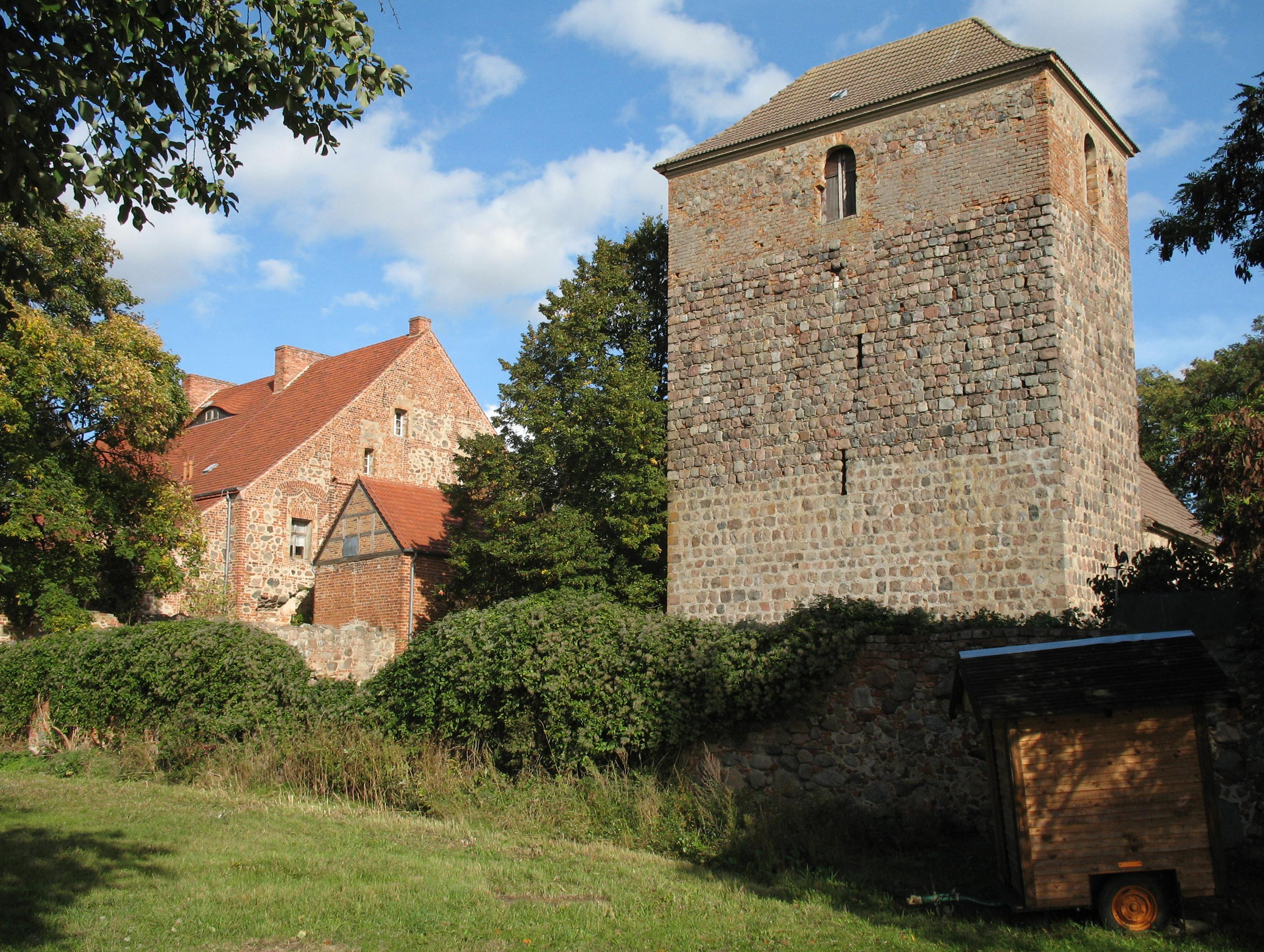
Fortified house and church in Badingen

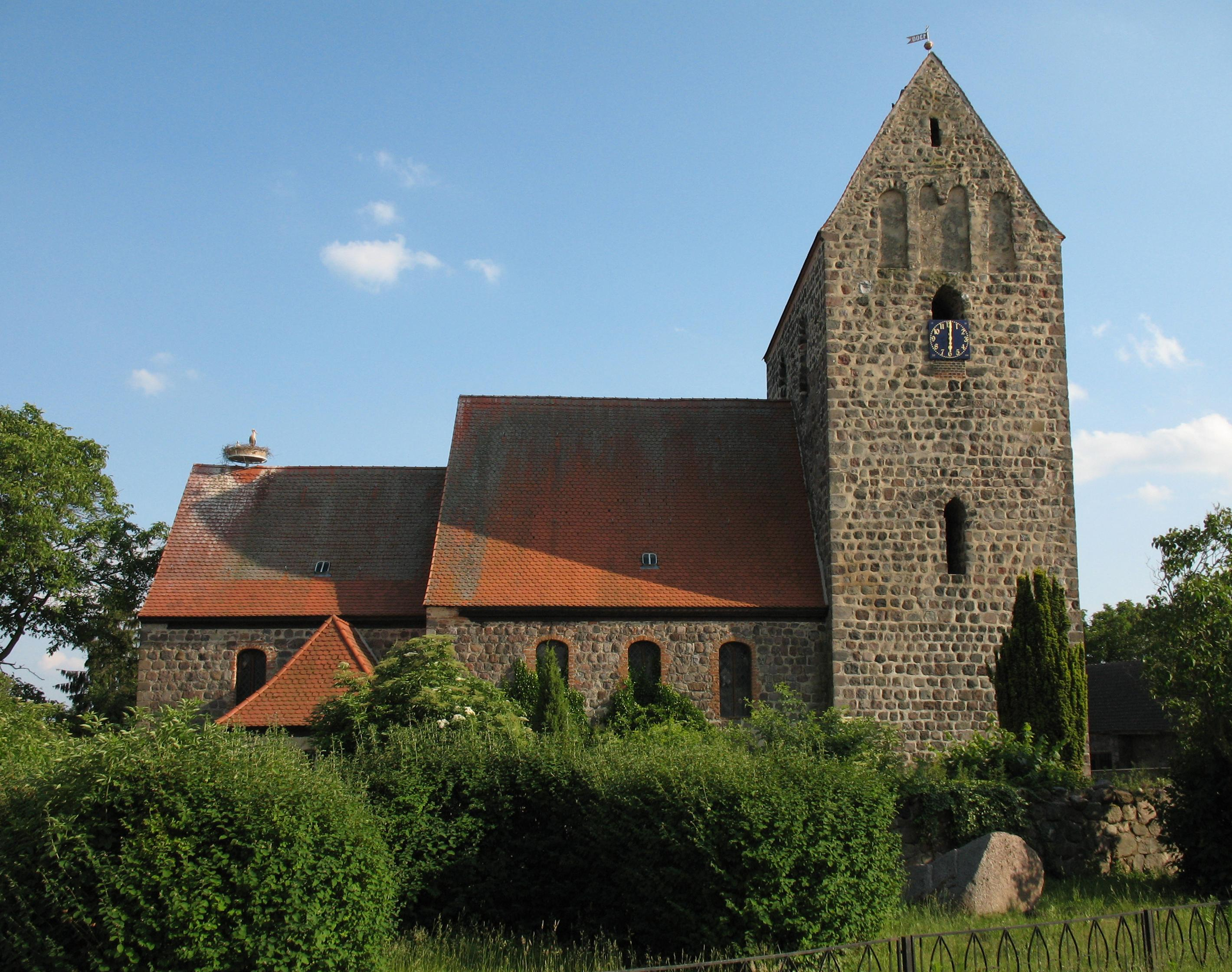
Church in Bergsdorf

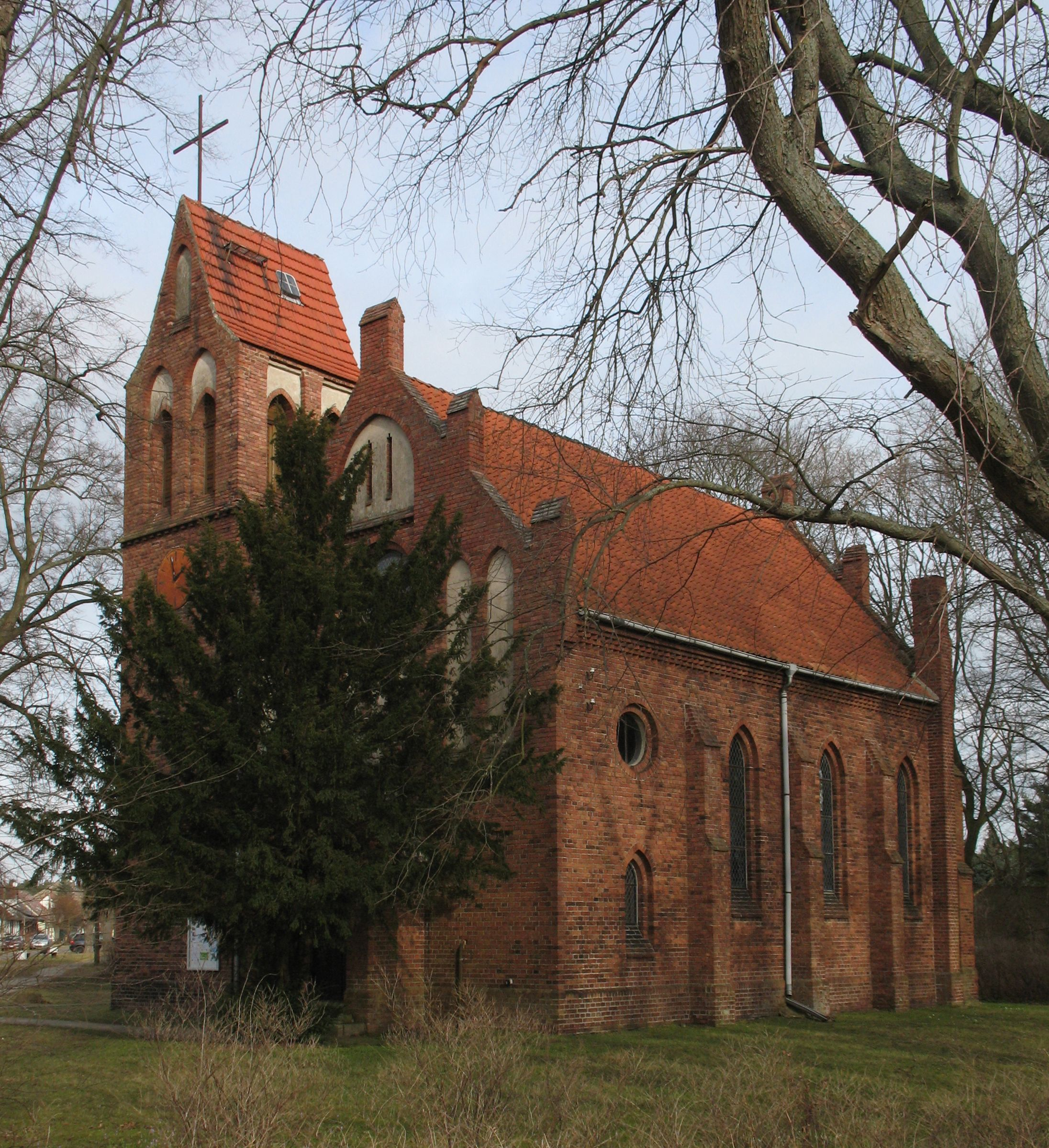
Church in Kappe
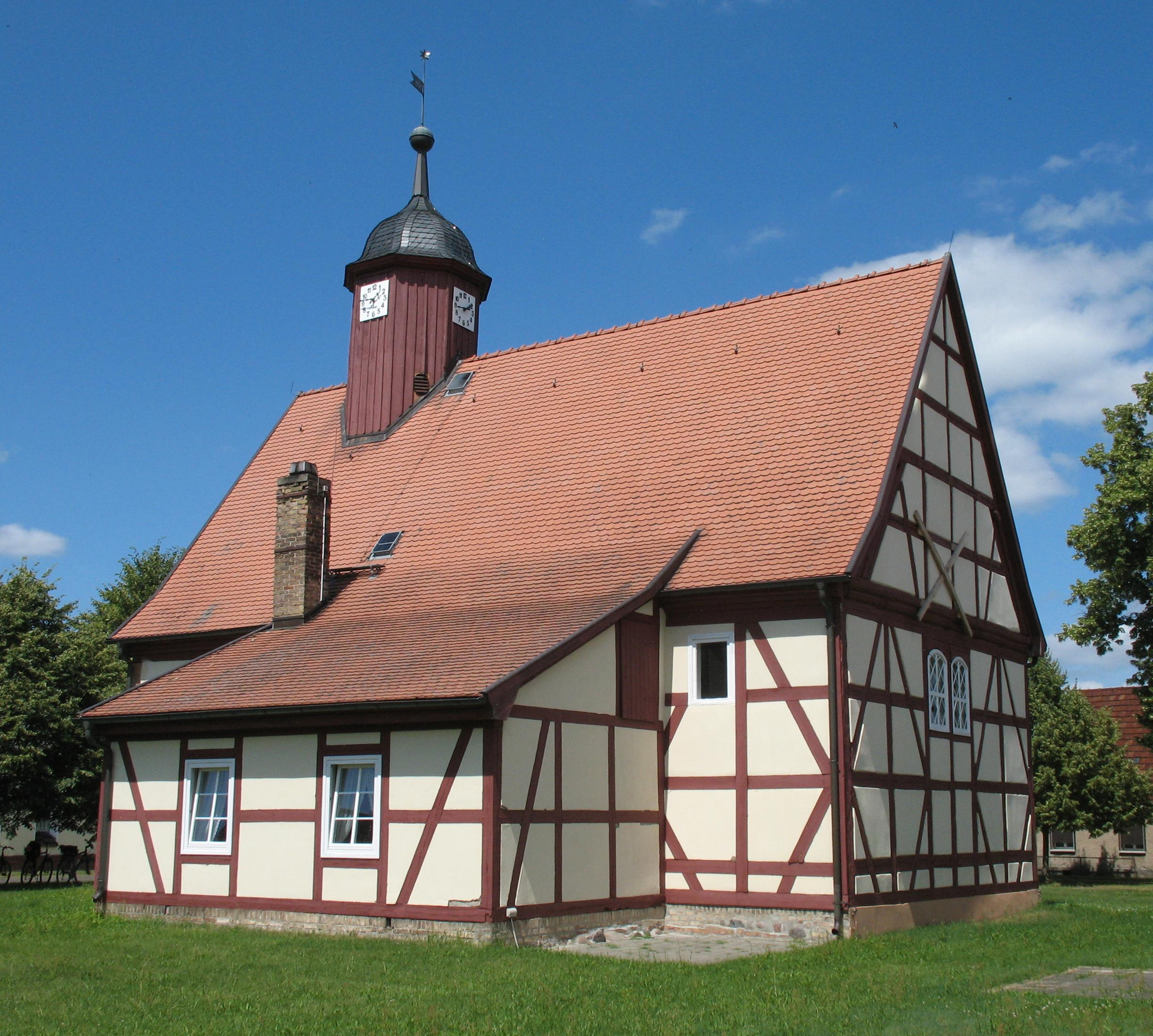
Church in Krewelin

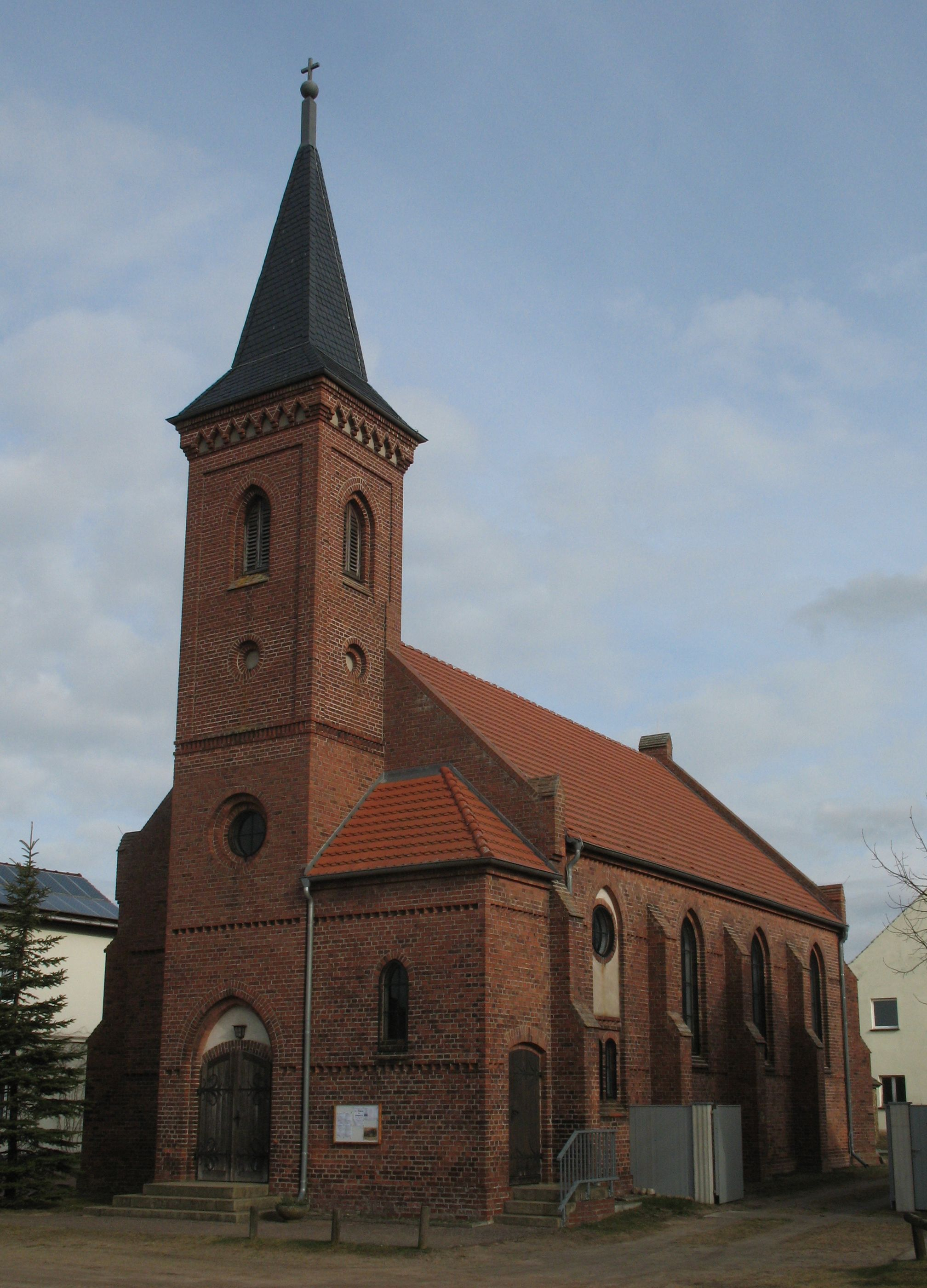
Church in Kurtschlag

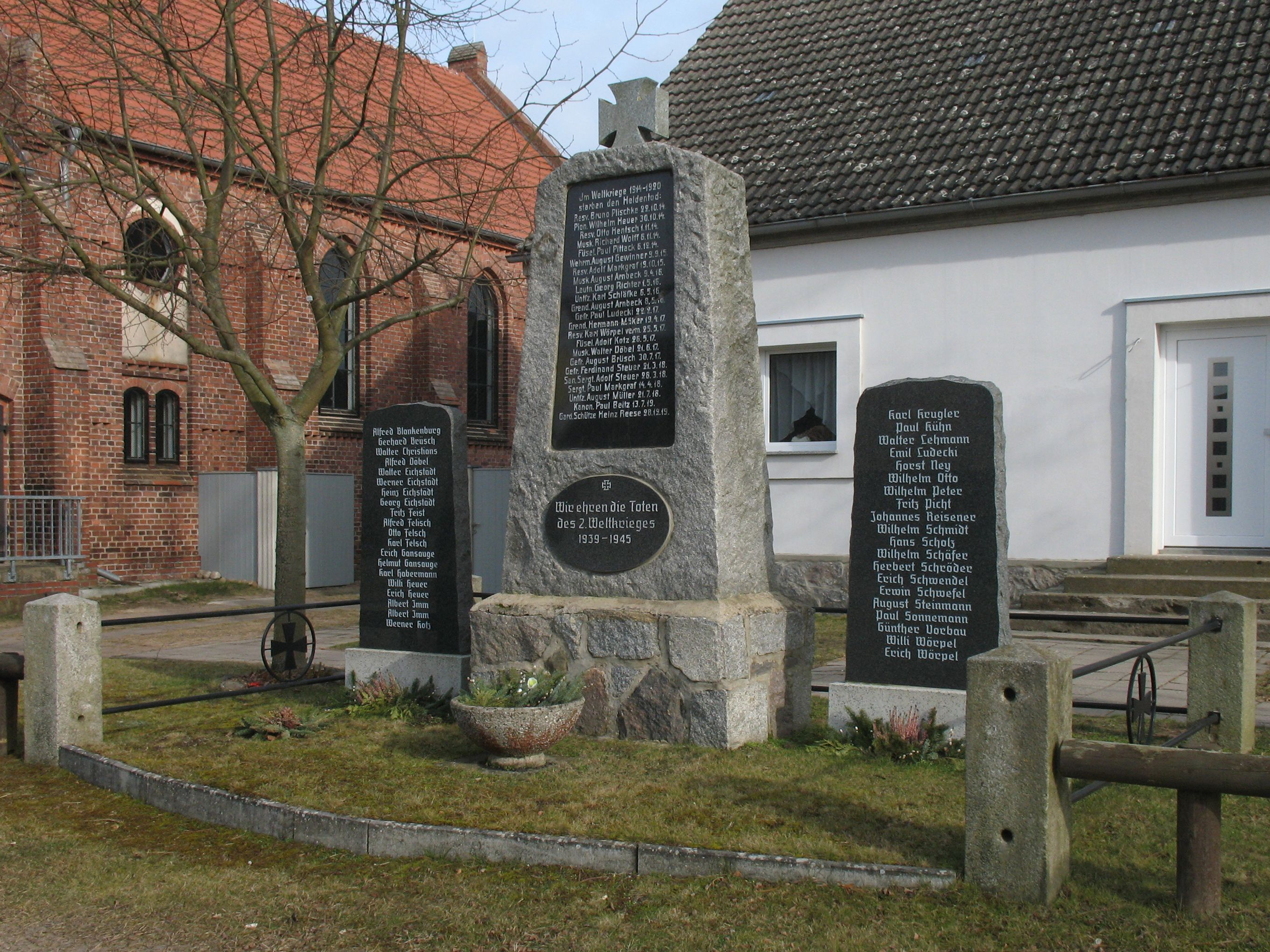
War memorial in Kurtschlag

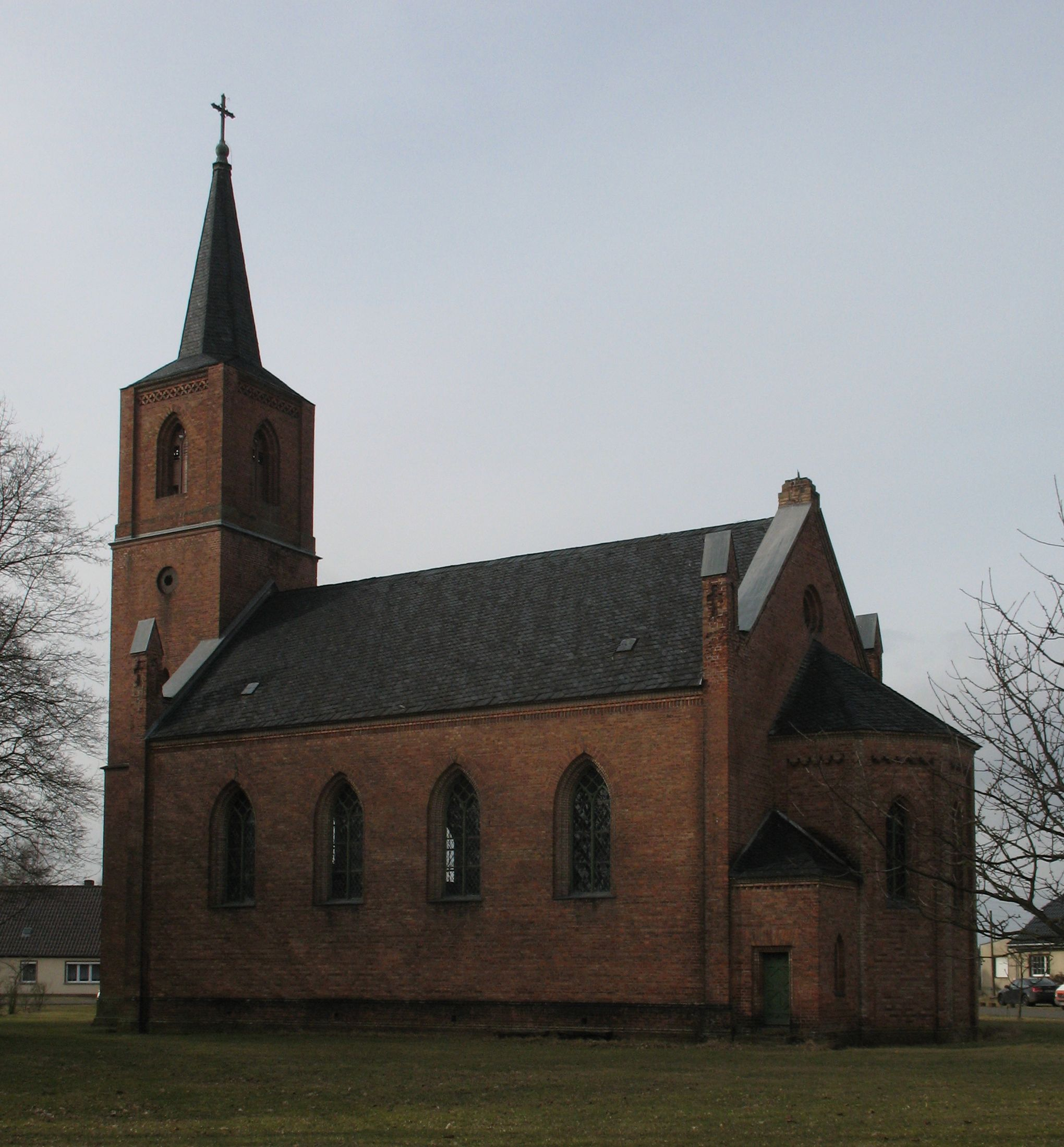
Church in Wesendorf
