= Günther Morbach =

German opera singer (1927–2009)

- Born: 26 November 1927; Zehdenick, Germany
- Died: 4 August 2009 (aged 81); Braunschweig, Germany
- Education: Musikhochschule Hamburg
- Occupation: Operatic bass
- Organizations: Oper Frankfurt; Opernhaus Dortmund; Staatstheater Braunschweig

Günther Morbach (26 November 1927 – 4 August 2009) was a German classical bass in opera and concert. He performed major roles at German opera houses and on international tours.

== Career ==
Born in Zehdenick, Morbach studied voice at the Musikhochschule Hamburg from the end of the 1940s with Prof. Korberg. He made his stage debut at the Stadttheater Flensburg in 1955, as the Polizeikommissar in Der Rosenkavalier by Richard Strauss. He was from 1956 a member of Stadttheater Augsburg, from 1959 of the Opernhaus Essen, from 1960 of the Oper Frankfurt, and from 1965 of the Opernhaus Dortmund. In 1966, when the new opera house was opened, he appeared as Sarastro in Mozart's Die Zauberflöte, conducted by Wilhelm Schüchter.

Morbach was a member of the Staatstheater Braunschweig from 1969, where he stayed until he retired from the stage in 1993. He performed more than 180 roles, of comic as well as serious characters. In the German repertoire, he was known for Don Alfonso in Così fan tutte, Rocco in Beethoven's Fidelio, van Bett in Lortzing's Zar und Zimmermann, Baculus in Der Wildschütz, Daland in Wagner's Der fliegende Holländer, König Heinrich in Lohengrin, Hunding in Die Walküre, Pogner in Die Meistersinger von Nürnberg. Main roles in the Italian repertoire were Bartolo in Rossini's Der Barbier von Sevilla, Dulcamara in Donizetti's L'elisir d'amore, Malatesta in Don Pasquale, Fiesco in Verdi's Simon Boccanegra, and the Inquisitor in Don Carlos. He appeared as Pimen in Mussorgsky's Boris Godunov, Pommersfelden in Hindemith's Mathis der Maler, Schigolch in Alban Berg's Lulu, and Oberlin in Wolfgang Rihm's Jakob Lenz. In the premiere of the chamber opera Gestörte Frequenzen by Harald Weiss in Braunschweig, he appeared as one of the Four Voices. He toured, mainly with the Oper Frankfurt, to London, Paris, Copenhagen, Athens, Barcelona and Rio de Janeiro.

Morbach was also active in concerts and oratorios. He sang the bass solo in Bach's Christmas Oratorio in a concert which Karl Richter conducted at the Salzburg Großes Festspielhaus on 10 December 1966, with Ursula Buckel, Hertha Töpper and Ernst Haefliger. He recorded the bass part in Beethoven's Missa solemnis, with Günter Wand conducting the chorus and orchestra of the Gürzenich in Cologne, alongside Leonore Kirschstein, Jeanne Deroubaix and Peter Schreier. He is remembered as an actor with stage presence, who charmed even in small roles.

Morbach died on 4 August 2009. In 2010, the Braunschweig theatre showed a photo exhibition in his memory.
