= Zehdenick Abbey =

Cistercian nunnery

Coordinates: 52°58′39″N 13°20′16″E

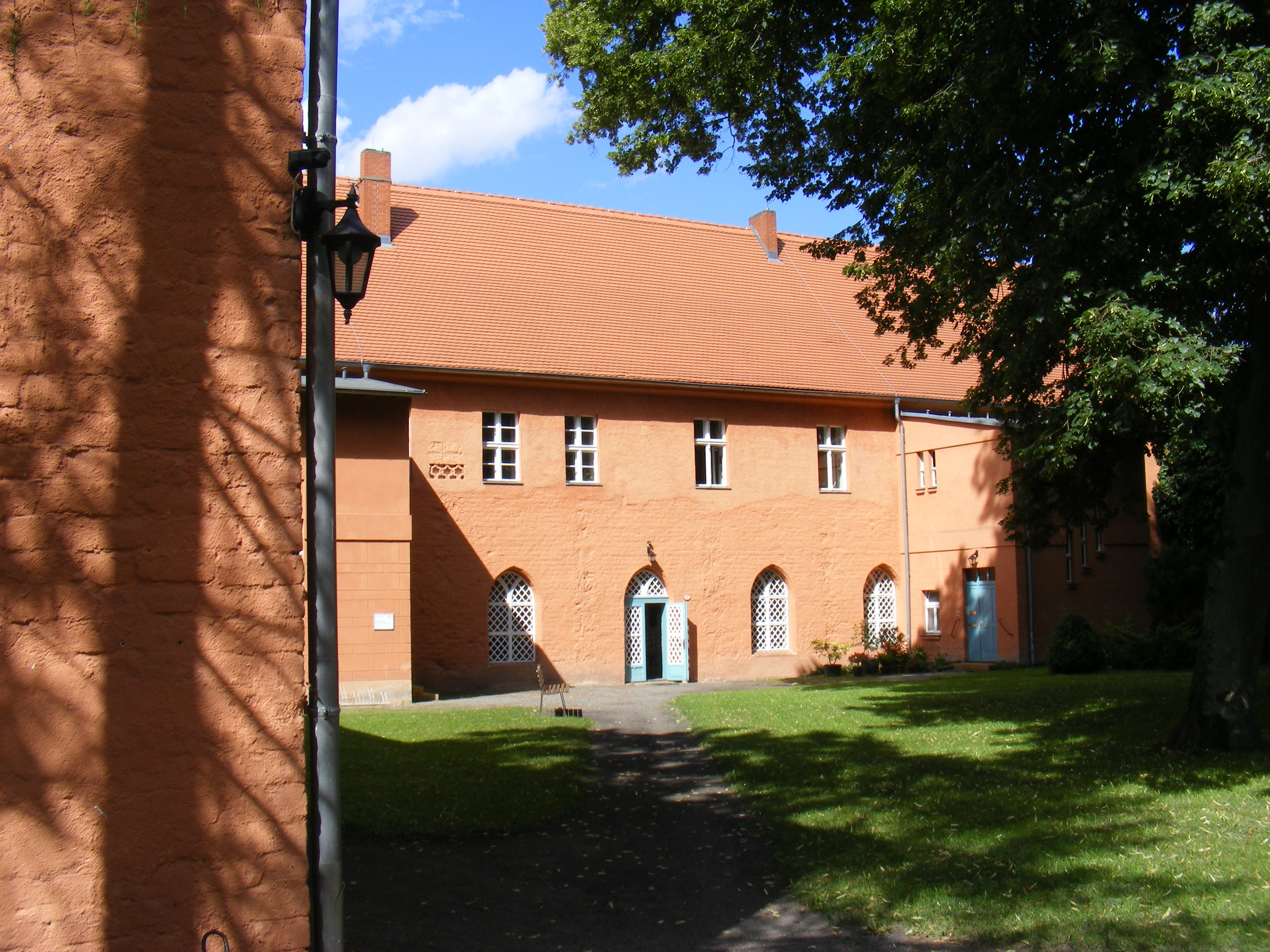
Zehdenick Abbey: north wing

Zehdenick Abbey (German: Kloster Zehdenick) was a Cistercian nunnery founded in 1250 or shortly after in Zehdenick in Mark Brandenburg, Germany It was dissolved in 1541 during the Reformation. The buildings were mostly destroyed during the Thirty Years' War. Those that remain are used for various religious and community purposes.

== Foundation legend ==
The circumstances leading to the foundation of the abbey are described in a legend transmitted by the märkische chronicler Andreas Angelus, according to which Zehdenick became a place of pilgrimage after a "miracle of the host" took place there in 1249: a woman innkeeper is said to have buried a consecrated host beneath her beer barrel in the cellar in order to obtain God's help in increasing the beer consumption of her guests. When she confessed this blasphemous act to her priest, he ordered the host to be dug up again. When this was done, blood flowed from the ground in several places, which was caught in a vessel and put on the altar of the church. A chapel was built over the site, still commemorated today in Kapellenstraße ("Chapel Street") in Zehdenick. The reports of this "blood miracle of Zehdenick" (Blutwunder von Zehdenick) drew many pilgrims to the town.

The Margraves of Brandenburg Otto III and Johann I and their sister Matilda of Brandenburg, Duchess of Brunswick-Lüneburg, founded the abbey partly, to be sure, on account of the increasing number of pilgrims, but doubtless largely also from strategic considerations regarding the establishment of the power of the Ascanians in their recently acquired territory of the Uckermark.

The nunnery was initially dedicated to the Blessed Virgin Mary and Saint George, but in 1409 the later dedication to the Holy Cross is documented for the first time, in a letter of the Antipope Alexander V.

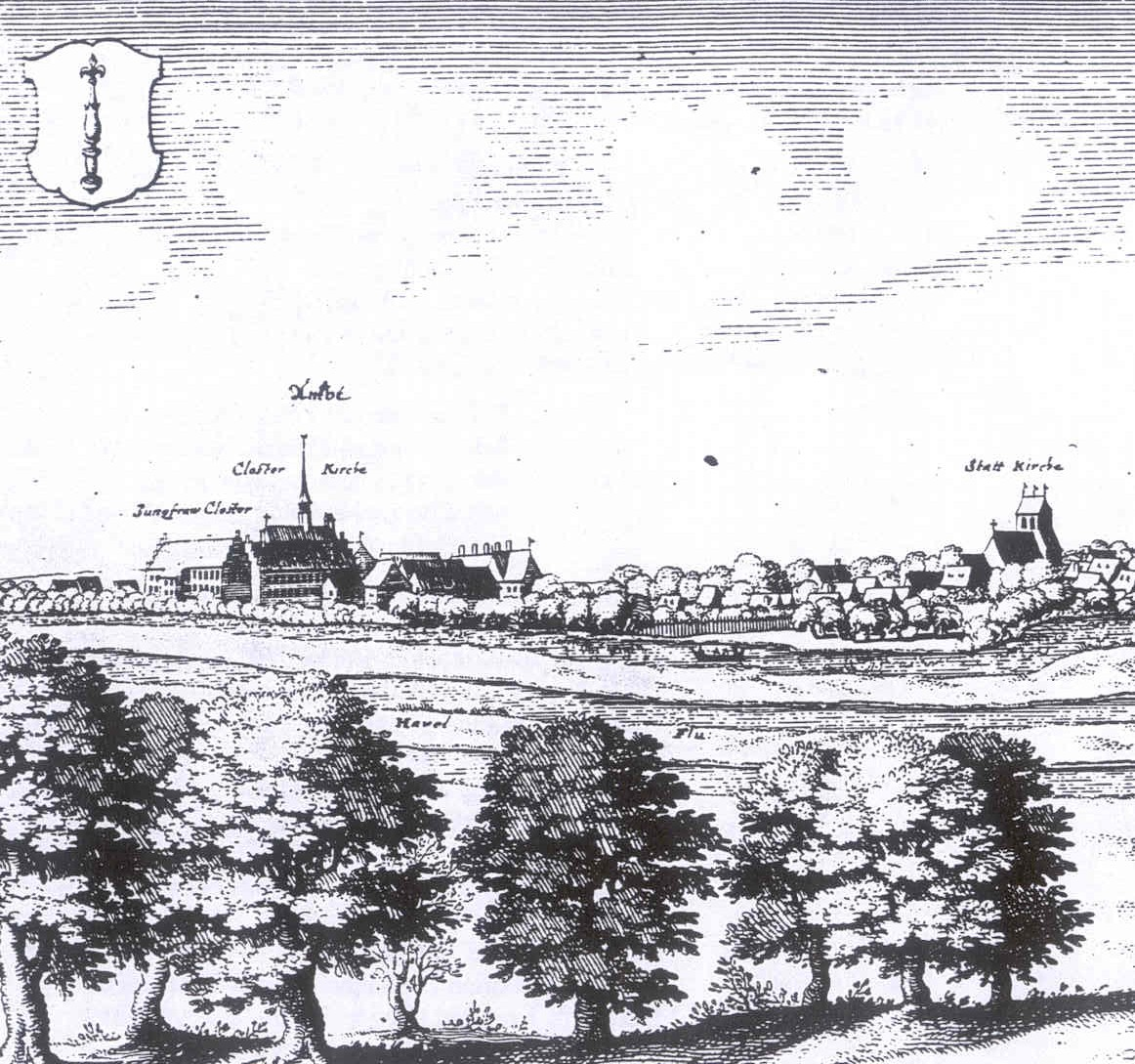
Copper engraving by Merian, c. 1660; an idealised representation of the abbey is to the left

== History ==
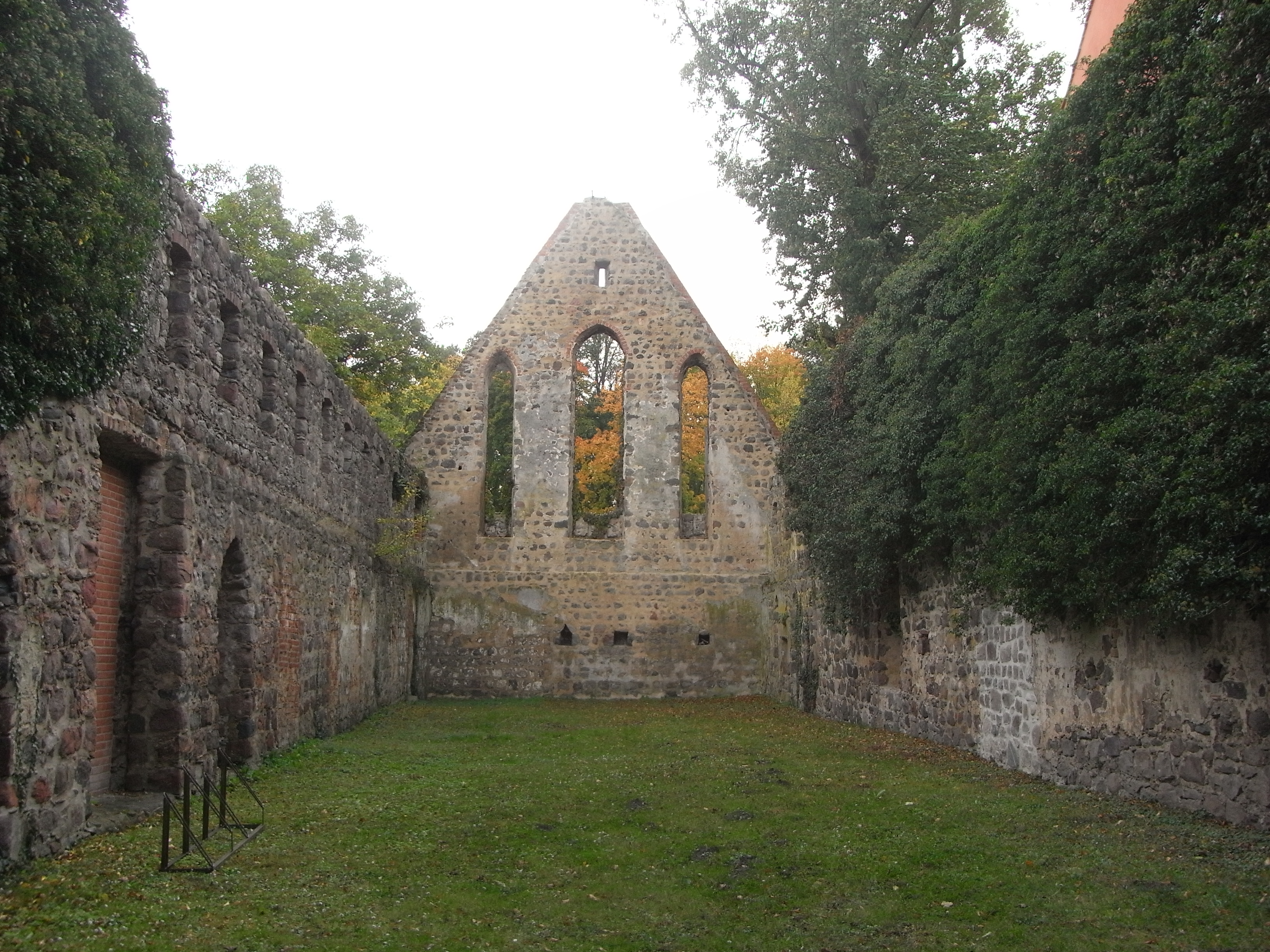
Ruins

At its beginning the community consisted of twelve nuns, who were able in 1252 to move into the newly completed dormitory. In 1254 Pope Alexander IV confirmed the foundation. Further building works were financially supported by Bishop Otto of Brandenburg in 1255 and by the Archbishop of Magdeburg, Erich of Brandenburg, in 1287. Like many other Cistercian houses Zehdenick became wealthy and by the time of the Reformation possessed 16 villages, with interests in another two, forests, and fishery rights in 13 lakes and a river, presumably the Havel.

In 1541, when the Reformation reached Mark Brandenburg, the abbey became a secular college for noblewomen (Adlige Frauenstift), which ladies entered without making any religious profession. The abbey's estates passed into the possession of the rulers of Brandenburg. A government agency decided who was allowed to enter the community and undertook its care and maintenance.

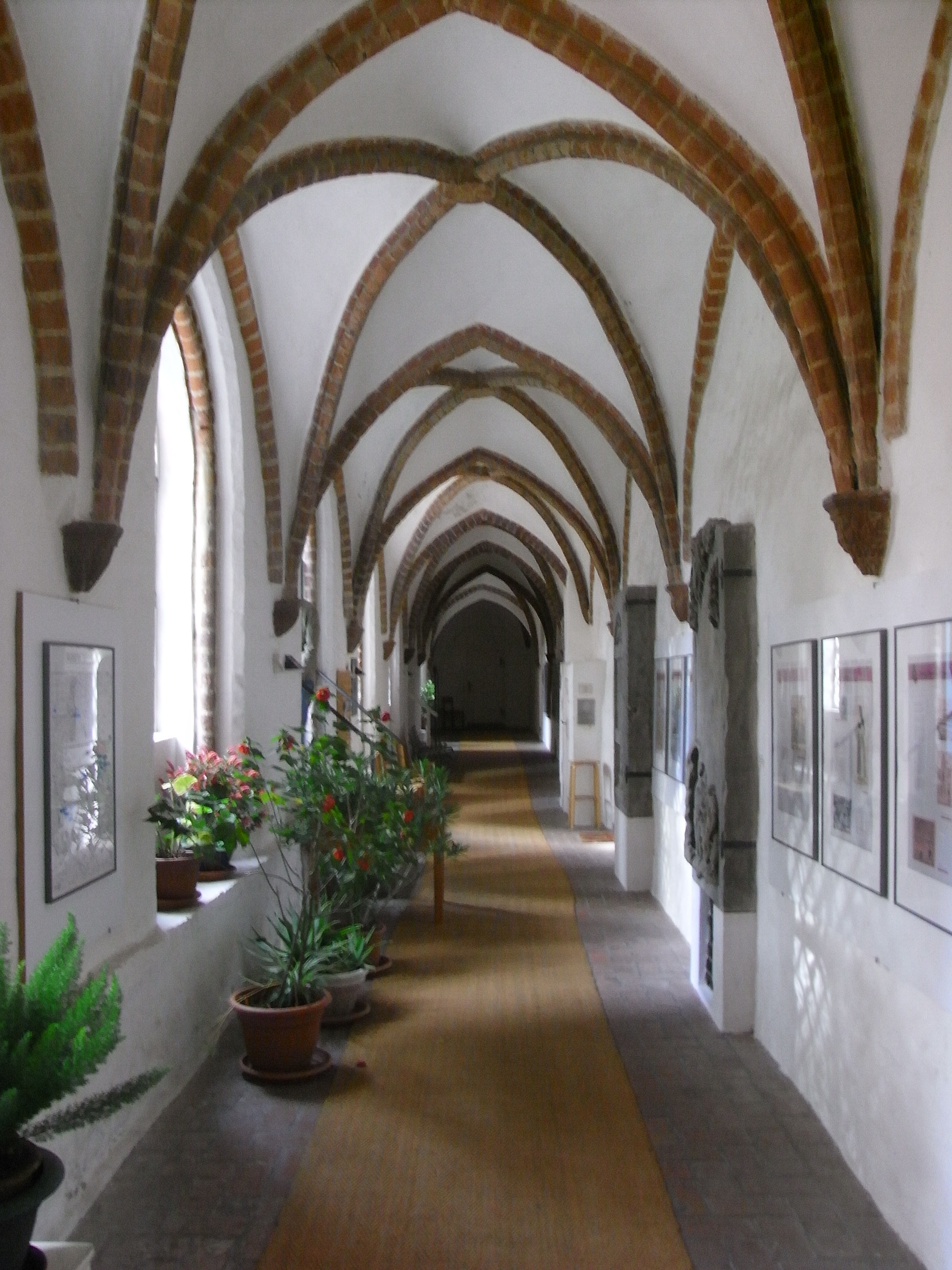
Cloister

During the Thirty Years' War the buildings were largely destroyed. All that now remain are the external walls of the dormitory, the north and west wings, parts of the cloister and of the so-called "abbey barn", which was originally the infirmary, the school and the pilgrims' lodging. The church was rebuilt in 1768, but burnt down in 1801 after being struck by lightning and subsequently reduced to the remains of the outside walls. Some seven ladies remained in residence nevertheless, for whom the north wing was converted. The Stift continued in existence until 1945.

After the end of World War II, in 1946, the establishment was put under the Evangelical Church of Berlin-Brandenburg. Today it is administered by the Evangelical Church of Berlin-Brandenburg-Schlesische Oberlausitz and provides accommodation for people associated with the church.

== Present day ==
The former abbey premises include the following:

- in the north wing, two vaulted rooms containing a copy of the Zehdenicker Altarstuch ("Zehdenick altar cloth"), the original of which is in the Märkisches Museum, Berlin;
- a family and marriage counselling service;
- the Zehdenick branch of the Evangelische Posaunendienst in Deutschland;
- a gallery in the abbey barn, run by the Kulturlandschaft Brandenburg-Nord Society

== Sources ==
- Demke, A.: Zisterzienserinnen-Kloster Zehdenick (pamphlet). Stiftskapitel Kloster Zehdenick: May 2008
