= David McSkimming =

Australian pianist

David McSkimming OAM (6 March 1950 – 17 March 2016) was an Australian pianist best known as an accompanist and, over many years, a regular performer in concert and on radio for the ABC. After graduating with a master's degree in Piano Performance, he played harpsichord and organ continuo and piano with the Melbourne and Adelaide Symphony Orchestras, Orchestra Victoria and the Adelaide Chamber Orchestra. He also played horn in the Adelaide Symphony Orchestra. From 2006, McSkimming was Head of Music at Victorian Opera.

He gave recitals with many Australian musicians, including Yvonne Kenny, Marilyn Richardson, Emma Matthews and Jonathan Summers. He gave recitals with, amongst others, violinists Jane Peters and Miwako Abe and hornplayer Richard Runnels. In October 1998 as part of the Melbourne Festival, Mr McSkimming was the associate artist in recitals with the renowned Korean soprano Sumi Jo and American tenor Gary Lakes.

McSkimming was a member of the State Opera Of South Australia from 1976–1989, after which he worked with the Victoria State Opera as Principal Repetiteur until joining Opera Australia for the year 1997. He also worked with Opera Factory Zurich. His repertoire extended to more than 130 operas. David was an Associate Artist at the Australian National Academy of Music where he worked with artists including English mezzo-soprano Sarah Walker and Australian baritone Gregory Yurisich. He was based in Melbourne but for 9 years freelanced and as such travelled all over Australia as an accompanist and repetiteur. During 2003 David spent seven months as principal repetiteur for the State opera of South Australia's Ring Cycle.

McSkimming's recording with Rosamund Illing, Songs of Duparc and Poulenc, received widespread acclaim both in Australia and internationally and was voted "Australian Classical Vocal CD of the Year" in 1997. He also recorded a CD of Chinese songs with tenor Yu Jixing; and with violinist, Miwako Abe, a CD of French violin music. 2005 saw the release of a CD of English songs and duets sung by Anthony Warlow and David Hobson; and in 2006, Hobson and McSkimming recorded and released an album of French Songs.

McSkimming was awarded the Medal of the Order of Australia (OAM) for services to the Performing Arts on Australia Day, 2012.

He died of motor neurone disease on 17 March 2016.
