= Leonore Kirschstein =

German opera singer

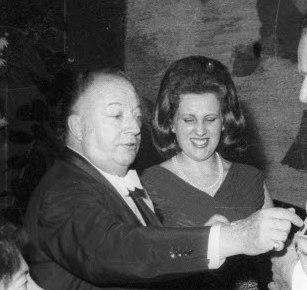
- Peter Kreuder and Kirschstein, 1970
- Born: 29 March 1933; Stettin
- Died: 26 February 2017 (aged 83)
- Education: Robert Schumann Conservatory
- Occupations: Operatic soprano; Voice teacher

Leonore Kirschstein (29 March 1933 – 26 February 2017) was a German soprano in opera and concert.

Born in Stettin (today Szczecin), Kirschstein received her training at the Robert Schumann Conservatory in Düsseldorf, where her instructor was Franziska Martienssen-Lohmann. Kirschstein began her career at the Städtische Oper Berlin in 1958, and from 1960 to 1963 she was on the roster of the Stadttheater Kiel; from 1965 to 1968 she was a member of the company at the Theater Augsburg. Beginning in 1968 Kirschstein was a regular member of the company at the Bavarian State Opera in Munich, where she had previously appeared as a guest artist; her roles there included Alice Ford in Verdi's Falstaff in 1966, conducted by Joseph Keilberth and alongside Dietrich Fischer-Dieskau as Falstaff. and a role in the world premiere of Isang Yun's Sin Tjong in 1972.

During her career she appeared at numerous international festivals. She sang at the Salzburg Festival the soprano part in Mozart's Requiem in 1961, and appeared there in 1970 as the First Lady in Die Zauberflöte. She performed at the Edinburgh Festival in 1965 and 1971. Kirschstein was also active as a recitalist and oratorio singer.

After her retirement from the stage she worked in Augsburg as a voice teacher. Her recordings include Die Zauberflöte and Wagner's Lohengrin. She sang the soprano part in Helmuth Rilling's 1966 recording of Bach's drama per musica Schleicht, spielende Wellen, BWV 206, alongside Margarethe Bence, Kurt Equiluz and Erich Wenk. She appeared as Anna in a 1966 live recording of Marschner's Hans Heiling, with Hermann Prey in the title role and Liane Synek as Heiling's mother, with Joseph Keilberth conducting choir and orchestra of the WDR. She recorded Beethoven's Missa solemnis with Günter Wand conducting the chorus and orchestra of the Gürzenich in Cologne, alongside Jeanne Deroubaix, Peter Schreier and Günther Morbach. In 1968, she portrayed Cardillac's daughter in a recording of Hindemith's Cardillac, conducted by Keilberth with Dietrich Fischer-Dieskau in the title role.
