= Steve Davislim =

Malaysian-born Australian operatic tenor (1967–2024)

Steve Davislim (14 May 1967 – 10 August 2024) was a Malaysian-born Australian operatic tenor. He was of Chinese and Irish ancestry and was based in Vienna, Austria.

== Biography ==
Davislim was born Steven Lim in George Town, Penang, Malaysia, in 1967. His father David Lim is of Chinese ancestry, his parents having settled in Penang from China before World War II. David Lim met his Irish wife Joyce Davis, a nurse, while studying at the Royal College of Surgeons in Dublin in the 1950s and 60s. They returned to Penang after marrying. Soon after Steve's birth, the family moved to Australia, firstly to Tasmania, then to Melbourne. It was there that the young Steve Lim joined both his parents' names to create the name Davislim.

Davislim worked as a horn player in brass groups and orchestras for eight years while studying for his Bachelor of Music at the Victorian College of the Arts. While there, he commenced vocal studies under Dame Joan Hammond, and graduated with honours. He sang with the Victoria State Opera for three years. At the 1988 Melbourne Spoleto Fringe Festival, he made his debut with the Treason of Images theatre company as Jove and Sylvia in La Calisto by Francesco Cavalli.

After gaining an overseas study grant from the Australia Council, he undertook studies in Italy, Greece (with John Modenos), Germany and Switzerland, where he spent two years studying Lieder interpretation with the accompanist Irwin Gage at the International Opera Studio of the Zurich University of the Arts. His other studies included masterclasses with Gösta Winbergh, Neil Shicoff, Ileana Cotrubaș and Luigi Alva.

Davislim became a member of the Zurich Opera in 1994. His roles there included Count Almaviva in Rossini's The Barber of Seville, Achilles in Offenbach's La belle Hélène, Tamino in Mozart's The Magic Flute, Ferrando in Così fan tutte, Don Ottavio in Don Giovanni, Camille in Lehár's The Merry Widow, and Gonsalvo in Ravel's L'heure espagnole.

He also appeared at the Salzburg Festival, the Hamburg Opera, the Berlin Staatsoper, and the Mozart Festival Schönbrunn, Vienna. He made his debut at the Chicago Lyric Opera in 2005. He attracted much positive attention in December 2005 with his performance in the title role of Mozart's Idomeneo at the season opening of La Scala in Milan.

In 2007 he sang the lead role in the world premiere of Teneke, an opera set in 20th-century Turkey, written by the Italian composer Fabio Vacchi.

He participated in the recording of Beethoven's Ninth Symphony with the Tonhalle Orchester Zürich, part of that group's prize-winning complete Beethoven symphony recording on the Ars Nova label. His other discography includes Mozart's Requiem with Christian Thielemann, Bach cantatas with Sir John Eliot Gardiner, Richard Strauss orchestral lieder under Simone Young, Martinů's Julietta under Sir Charles Mackerras, and Michael Tippett's A Child of Our Time with Sir Colin Davis and the London Symphony Orchestra.

In 2007 he participated, along with an all-Australian cast, in the world premiere recordings of two works by Camille Saint-Saëns: the opera Hélène (written for Davislim's Australian operatic forebear Nellie Melba), and the cantata Nuit persane, both with Orchestra Victoria conducted by Guillaume Tourniaire.

He was a frequent concert singer, appearing with the Chicago Symphony, the BBC Symphony, the San Francisco Symphony, the Royal Danish Orchestra, and the Cleveland Orchestra. His appearances at the BBC Proms include Schumann's Scenes from Goethe's Faust (1999), Mendelssohn's Symphony No. 2 'Lobgesang' (2009), and Beethoven's Symphony No. 9 'Choral' (2014; under Alan Gilbert (deputising for an indisposed Riccardo Chailly). He also made numerous live and broadcast appearances with the Australian Broadcasting Corporation.

Davislim died on 10 August 2024, at the age of 57.

== Selected recordings ==
- Karol Szymanowski: Concerto for violin N° 1, Symphony N° 3 "Chant de la nuit", Christian Tetzlaff, violin, Vienna Philharmonic Orchestra, Singverein Chorus, Steve Davislim, ténor, conducted by Pierre Boulez. CD Deutsche Grammophon 2009 & 2010. Diapason d'or of the year 2011
