= Marianna Radev =

Croatian opera singer

- Marianna Radev in Carmen (photo with 1950 dedication)
- Born: Marijana Radev
- Occupation: contralto opera singer

Marianna Radev, also Marijana Radev, (21 November 1913 – 17 September 1973) was a Croatian contralto. Radev was considered one of the great alto singers in the period after the Second World War. Above all in Italy and in Berlin, she gained a great reputation "because of her rich, expressive and seemingly never-ending alto voice".

Radev was born on 21 September 1913 in Constanța, Romania, to a Bulgarian father and Croatian mother. She studied piano and vocals at the music academy of Zagreb. Afterwards she had her voice further trained in Milan and Trieste with Riccardo Stracciari among others. In 1937 she debuted as Marina in Modest Mussorgsky's Boris Godunov at the Teatro Verdi in Trieste. Since 1938 she sang at the Teatro Reale in Rome, and from 1940 at the opera in Zagreb. After the Second World War she gave guest performances at the Teatro la Scala, in Rome and Vienna. From 1959 to 1961 she was a member of the Bavarian State Opera. During guest performances in the great music centres of the world (Vienna, Munich, Berlin, Paris, London, Buenos Aires, Moscow) she was celebrated as an esteemed alto.

She participated in recordings of Verdi's Requiem, Beethoven's Missa solemnis and Rossini's Stabat mater for the Deutsche Grammophon label. Her recordings under Ferenc Fricsay (especially the Verdi Requiem and the Carl Orff ones) and under Karl Böhm are highly popular among record collectors and music connoisseurs. "Her repertoire was wide and eclectic, and especially her song recordings show the emotional and interpretative maturity of the artist".

In her last years the artist lived in her Croatian homeland, where she still occasionally gave concerts. She died on 30 September 1973 at age 59 during a rehearsal for a baroque concert.

== Literature ==
- Friedrich Herzfeld (1973). "Radev, Marianna". Ullstein Lexikon der Musik (6 ed.). Frankfurt: Ullstein GmbH. p. 433.
- Wilibald Gurlitt, Carl Dahlhaus (publisher) (1959). "Radev, Marianna". Riemann Musik-Lexikon. In drei Bänden und zwei Ergänzungsbänden. Vol. 2. Personenteil L–Z (12. völlig neubearbeitete Auflage ed.). Mainz: B. Schotts-Söhne.
- Wilibald Gurlitt, Carl Dahlhaus (publisher) (1972). Riemann Musik-Lexikon. In drei Bänden und zwei Ergänzungsbänden. Vol. 5. Ergänzungsband, Personenteil L–Z (12. völlig neubearbeitete Auflage ed.). Mainz: B. Schotts-Söhne.
- Karl-Josef Kutsch, Leo Riemens (2004). Großes Sängerlexikon. ISBN 3-89853-433-2.
