= Rosamund Illing =

Rosamund Illing is an English Australian soprano. Together with Richard Bonynge and the Australian Opera and Ballet Orchestra Illing was nominated for the 2000 ARIA Award for Best Classical Album for the album Amoureuse: Sacred and Profane Arias.

== Discography ==
=== Albums ===
List of albums, with selected details
Title	Details
Duparc / Poulenc: Songs (with David McSkimming)	Released: 1996; Format: CD; Label: Chandos (CHAN 9427)
Amoureuse: Sacred & Profane Arias (with Richard Bonynge and Australian Opera and Ballet Orchestra)	Released: March 2000; Format: CD; Label: Melba Recordings (301080)
Camille Saint-Saëns Hélène	Released: 2008; Format: 2× CD; Label: Melba Recordings (MR 301114-2)

== Awards and nominations ==
=== ARIA Music Awards ===
The ARIA Music Awards is an annual awards ceremony that recognises excellence, innovation, and achievement across all genres of Australian music. They commenced in 1987.

Year	Nominee / work	Award	Result	Ref.
2000	Amoureuse: Sacred and Profane Arias (with Richard Bonynge and Australian Opera and Ballet Orchestra)	Best Classical Album	Nominated	
