= Berthold Held =

German actor and director (1868–1931)

Berthold Held (20 November 1868 – 27 February 1931) was a German actor, director, and acting teacher of Jewish descent. In 1914, he became head of the acting school of the Deutsches Theaters in Berlin, greatly impacting its direction and the next generation of German actors.

== Life and work ==
Berthold Held was born to Philip Held and Lina Brauchbar in Kroměříž, Moravia. In 1901, he married Clara Minna Martha Heuer in Berlin-Charlottenburg. This was the same year that he founded the theater Schall und Rauch (English: Sound and Smoke) with his childhood friend from Salzburg, Max Reinhardt, and Friedrich Kayssler. He worked as an actor and director at the Kleines Theater, Neues Theater, and Deutsches Theater Berlin. Beginning in 1905, Held directed the chorus and crowd scenes in Reinhardt's productions.

In 1914, he took over management of the acting school of the Deutsches Theaters while Reinhardt turned his full attention toward the theater business. As director of the school, Held was committed to comprehensive acting training, which included technique, voice training, role study and physical training in subjects such as gymnastics, fencing and dance. One of his students was Arnold Neuweiler who dedicated his book on Massenregie (1919) to Berthold Held.

In the 1920s, he campaigned for a state subsidy for the school. In 1924–25, he succeeded in gaining municipal funding; however, this was soon withdrawn. He founded a board of trustees in 1926, consisting of such personalities as Max Reinhardt and Harry Graf Kessler, to strengthen the educational and financial stability of the school.

=== Pedagogical Vision ===
Held was of the opinion that actors should receive a well-rounded education, not only being trained technically, but being educated as complete people. This included the mastery of physical, emotional and intellectual skills. His approach was characterized by Max Reinhardt's maxim of training actors to "shape human characters" and aimed at "training in freedom." As the head of the school for many years, he influenced generations of German-speaking theater artists.

== Publication (selection) ==
- 1905: Die Drehbühne, in: Bühne und Welt

== Directing (selection) ==
- 1911: Die schöne Helena (Münchner Künstlertheater), based on a production by Max Reinhardt, Music: Jacques Offenbach, Stage design: Ernst Stern
- 1916: Die Mottenburger (Deutsches Theater Berlin), Text: David Kalisch and August Weirauch
