= Katja Paryla =

German actress (1940–2013)

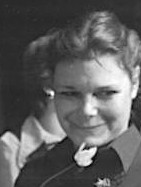
- Paryla in 1980
- Born: 25 January 1940; Zürich, Switzerland
- Died: 25 August 2013 (aged 73); Wölsickendorf, Brandenburg, Germany
- Education: Staatliche Schauspielschule
- Occupations: Actress; Stage director; Theatre director
- Organizations: Deutsches Theater; Schillertheater; Nationaltheater Weimar; Theater Chemnitz; Düsseldorfer Schauspielhaus
- Spouse(s): Kaspar Eichel (div.); Iván Gallardo
- Awards: Kunstpreis der DDR

Katharina "Katja" Paryla (25 January 1940 – 25 August 2013) was a German actress, stage director and theatre director. She was known especially for her work on stage, including at the Deutsches Theater Berlin where she often played leading roles with her partner Alexander Lang directing, including the title roles of Goethe's Iphigenie auf Tauris and Medea by Euripides, and Alice in Strindberg's Totentanz.

== Life and career ==
Paryla was born in Zürich on 25 January 1940, the daughter of the actor and stage director Emil Paryla and his wife Selly, an actress. Her father adopted his mother's surname Stöhr to be not confused with his famous brother Karl Paryla. Her parents had emigrated from Germany under the Nazi regime to Switzerland in 1938. The family moved to Vienna in 1946. When the Neues Theater in der Scala where her father was engaged closed in 1956 due to the Brecht boycott in Vienna, and he found no other jobs in Austria, they moved to East Berlin.

Paryla first studied fashion design at the Weißensee Academy of Art Berlin, graduating with an excellent diploma. She then studied acting at the Staatliche Schauspielschule Berlin (later: Ernst Busch Academy of Dramatic Arts, in Berlin-Schöneweide from 1961 to 1963. She made her stage debut, alongside her father, at Deutsches Theater Berlin as Milena Andertschowa in Oldřich Daněk's Die Hochzeit des Heiratsschwindlers. Wolfgang Heinz won her in 1963 to the Volksbühne in Berlin, and Kurt Veth in 1967 to the Maxim-Gorki-Theater.

From the late 1960s, Paryla also played in film and television. She was particularly successful in films for children, such as the 1978 Spuk unterm Riesenrad and Spuk im Hochhaus in 1981/82..

Paryla belonged to the ensemble of Deutsches Theater from 1978 to 1990, directed by Alexander Lang, who became her partner. She was described as "a beautiful, powerful and sensual presence with a great sense of comedy", not fixed to one type, but always searching for transformation with attention to detail; in collaboration with Lang, she portrayed especially tragic figures such as Goethe's Iphigenie and Medea by Euripides with psychological clarity.

She moved to the Schauspiel Zürich in 1990. After German reunification she then worked at the Schillertheater in Berlin until 1993, when the theatre was closed. She became stage director at the Nationaltheater Weimar from 1994 to 2001, and headed simultaneously the drama department of the University of Music and Theatre Leipzig. Paryla was a freelance actress until 2004 when she became director of the drama section of the Theater Chemnitz. She worked from 2008 at the Düsseldorfer Schauspielhaus.

Paryla was a member of the Akademie der Künste. She was awarded the Kunstpreis der DDR in 1983.

=== Personal life ===
Paryla lived in Wölsickendorf near Bad Freienwalde (Oder). She was first married to the actor Kaspar Eichel. She and her partner Alexander Lang had a son, Alexej Paryla, born in 1969, who became a graphic designer and stage designer. She finally lived with the actor Iván Gallardo.

Paryla died on 25 August 2013 in Wölsickendorf, at the age of 73.

== Theatre ==
=== Roles ===
Paryla's roles included:

==== Volksbühne Berlin ====
- 1965: Peter Hacks: Moritz Tassow (Mittelbauerntochter Jette) – dir. Benno Besson
- 1966: Max Frisch: Andorra (Barblin) – dir. Fritz Bornemann
- 1967: Peter Weiss: Die Verfolgung und Ermordung Jean Paul Marats (Rossignol) – dir. Bornemann

==== Maxim-Gorki-Theater ====
- 1966: Ivan Kotscherga: Der Uhrmacher und das Huhn (Lida)
- 1967: Rainer Kerndl: Die seltsame Reise des Alois Fingerlein (Tomatenkarla)
- 1968: Luigi Pirandello: Liola (Tuzza) – dir. Hans-Georg Simmgen
- 1971: Carlo Goldoni: La donna di garbo oder Liebe macht erfinderisch (Rosaura)
- 1972: William Congreve: Liebe für Liebe (Angelica) – dir. Karl Gassauer
- 1972: Afanassi Salynski: Maria (Maria Odinzewa)
- 1975: Maxim Gorky: Die Letzten (Ljubov) – dir: Wolfgang Heinz

==== Deutsches Theater Berlin ====
- 1978: Gotthold Ephraim Lessing: Miss Sara Sampson (Marwood) – dir. Alexander Lang
- 1980: Shakespeare: Ein Sommernachtstraum (Titania) – dir. Lang
- 1980: Sophokles: Elektra (Klytaimnestra) – dir. Friedo Solter (DT in Plenarsaal of the Akademie der Künste)
- 1980: Czekhov: Die Möwe (Frau Schamrajew) – dir: Wolfgang Heinz
- 1980: Tadeusz Różewicz: Weiße Ehe (Aunt) – dir. Rolf Winkelgrund (DT in Maxim Gorki Theater)
- 1982: Heinrich Mann: Die traurige Geschichte von Friedrich dem Großen (Sophie Dorothee) – dir. Lang, with Kurt Böwe
- 1983: Bertolt Brecht: Die Rundköpfe und die Spitzköpfe (Nanna) – dir. Lang
- 1984: Christian Dietrich Grabbe: Herzog Theodor von Gothland (Dirne) – dir. Lang
- 1984: Goethe: Iphigenie auf Tauris (Iphigenie) – dir. Lang
- 1986: Euripides: Medea (Medea) ― dir. Lang
- 1986: Strindberg: Totentanz (Alice) – dir. Lang
- 1987: Lessing: Nathan der Weise (Silah) – dir. Solter
- 1988: Volker Braun: Transit Europa (Wirtin)

=== Direction ===
Paryla directed plays including:

- 1990: Ionesco: Die kahle Sängerin, Die Begrüßung, Scène à quatre, Deutsches Theater
- 1991: Shakespeare: Henry VI, Deutsches Theater
- 1992: Nick Whitby: Dirty Dishes, Schiller-Theater
- 1994: Schiller: Maria Stuart, Nationaltheater Weimar
- 1996: Ionesco: Die Nashörner, Nationaltheater Weimar
- 1997: Ken Campbell: Mr. Pilks Irrenhaus, Nationaltheater Weimar
- 2000: Shakespeare: Liebes Leid und Lust, Nationaltheater Weimar
- 2002: Aischylos: Die Orestie, Deutsches Nationaltheater Weimar
- 2003: Shakespeare: Was ihr wollt, Schauspiel Chemnitz
- 2004: Einar Schleef (after Goldoni): Wilder Sommer, Schauspiel Chemnitz
- 2005: Schiller: Die Verschwörung des Fiesco zu Genua, Schauspiel Chemnitz
- 2005: Nestroy: Der böse Geist Lumpazivagabundus, Schauspiel Chemnitz
- 2006: Peter Shaffer, Amadeus, Opernhaus Chemnitz
- 2006: Shakespeare: Ein Sommernachtstraum, Schauspiel Chemnitz
- 2007: Schiller: Kabale und Liebe, Friedrich Schiller, Schauspiel Chemnitz
- 2008: Czekhov: Die Möwe, Anton Tschechow, Schauspiel Chemnitz
- 2011: Gorky: Nachtasyl, Theatre of West Pomerania, Greifswald

== Films ==
Paryla's film and television roles included:

- 1963: Die Spur führt in den 7. Himmel (TV film in five parts)
- 1965: Schlafwagen Paris-München (TV film)
- 1965: Tiefe Furchen
- 1967: Die Räuber (TV film)
- 1969: Geheime Spuren (TV series, two episodes)
- 1970: Netzwerk
- 1971: Kennen Sie Urban?
- 1971: Karriere
- 1975: Zwischen Nacht und Tag
- 1976: Beethoven – Tage aus einem Leben
- 1978: Spuk unterm Riesenrad
- 1979: Karlchen, durchhalten!
- 1980: Polizeiruf 110: Der Einzelgänger (TV series)
- 1980: Levins Mühle
- 1982: Spuk im Hochhaus
- 1983: Die traurige Geschichte von Friedrich dem Großen (recorded on stage live)
- 1985: Die Rundköpfe und die Spitzköpfe (recorded on stage live)
- 1987: Die erste Reihe (TV film)
- 1991: Stein
- 1992: Die Verfehlung
