= Bernhard Dilling =

German painter and stage designer

Bernhard "Hadti" Dilling (May 4, 1932, in Pfarrkirchen, Lower Bavaria, Germany – March 22, 1994) was a German painter, graphic artist, sculptor and stage designer.

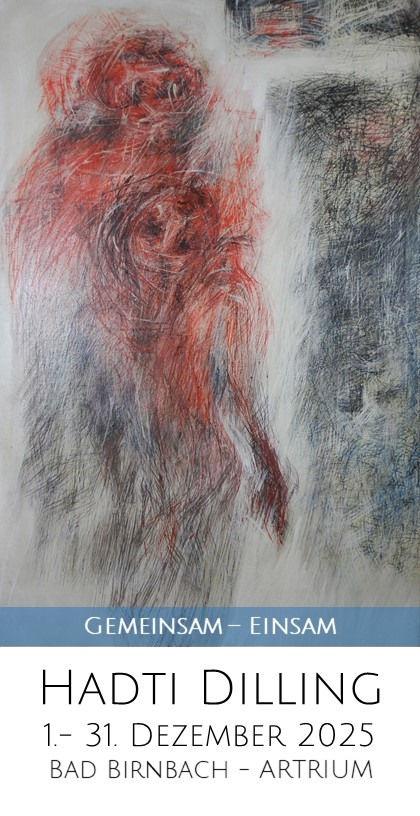
exhibition flyer, 2025

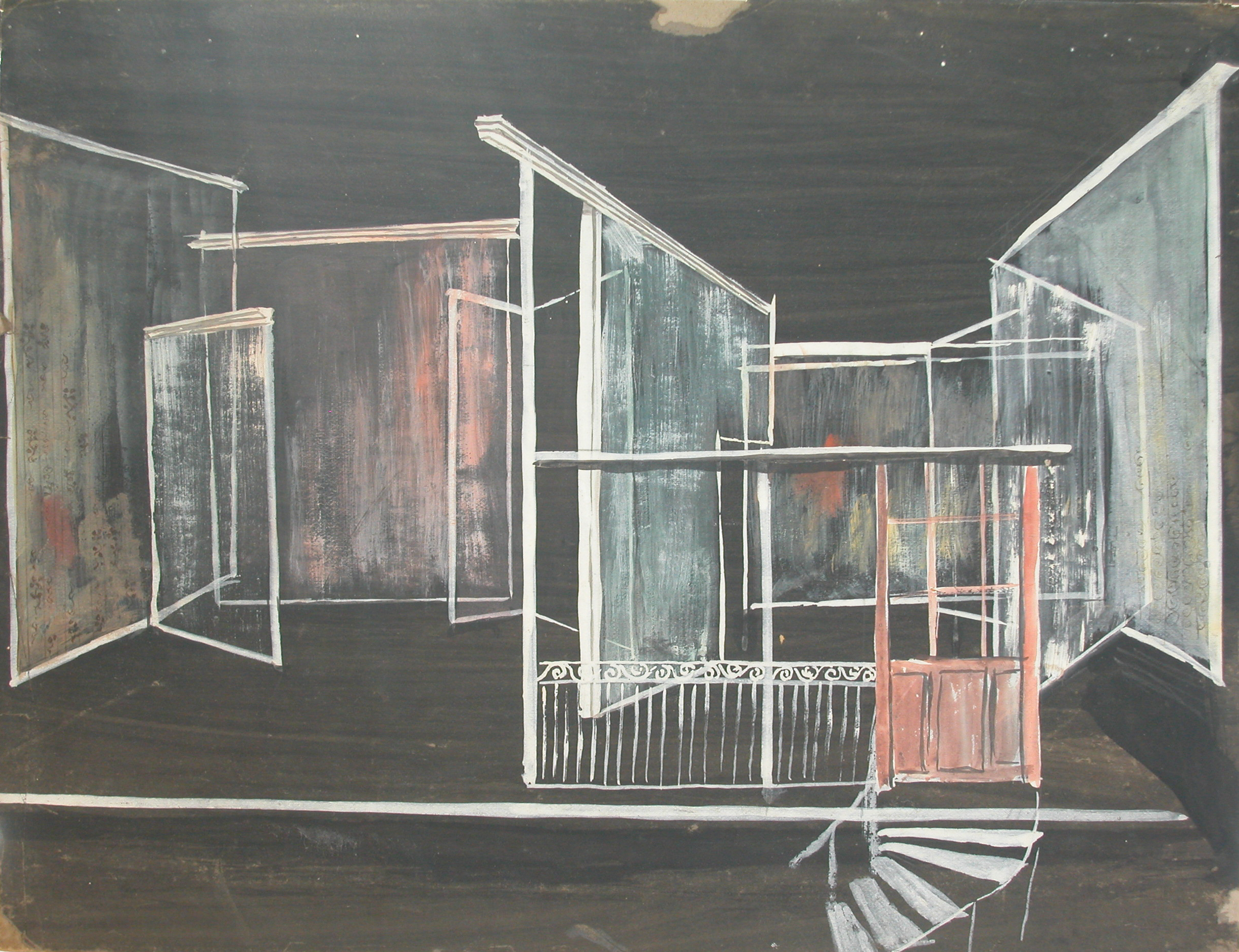
Bühnenbild, um 1965

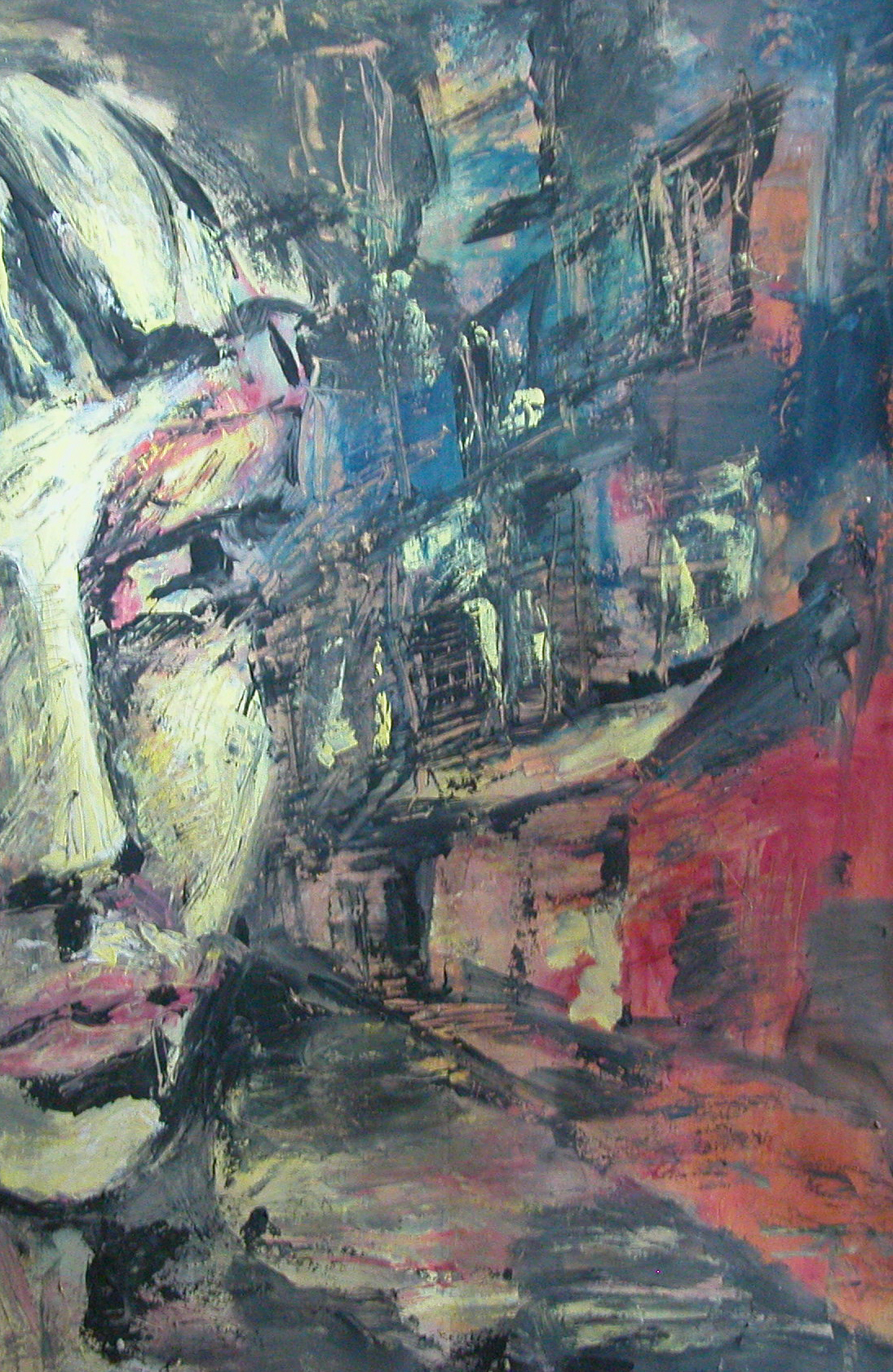
Die Schwägerin, um 1956

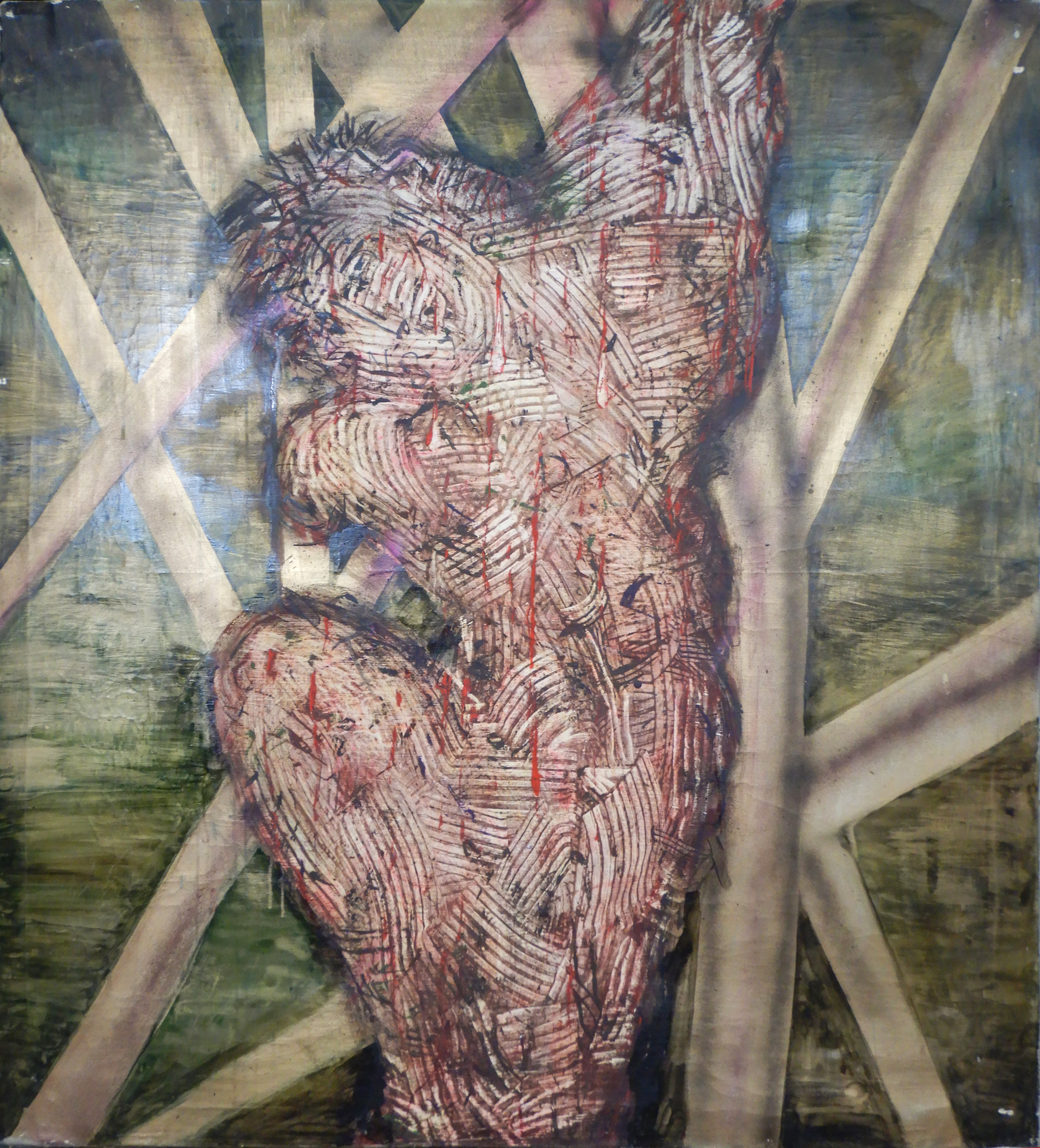
Kreuzigung, 1975

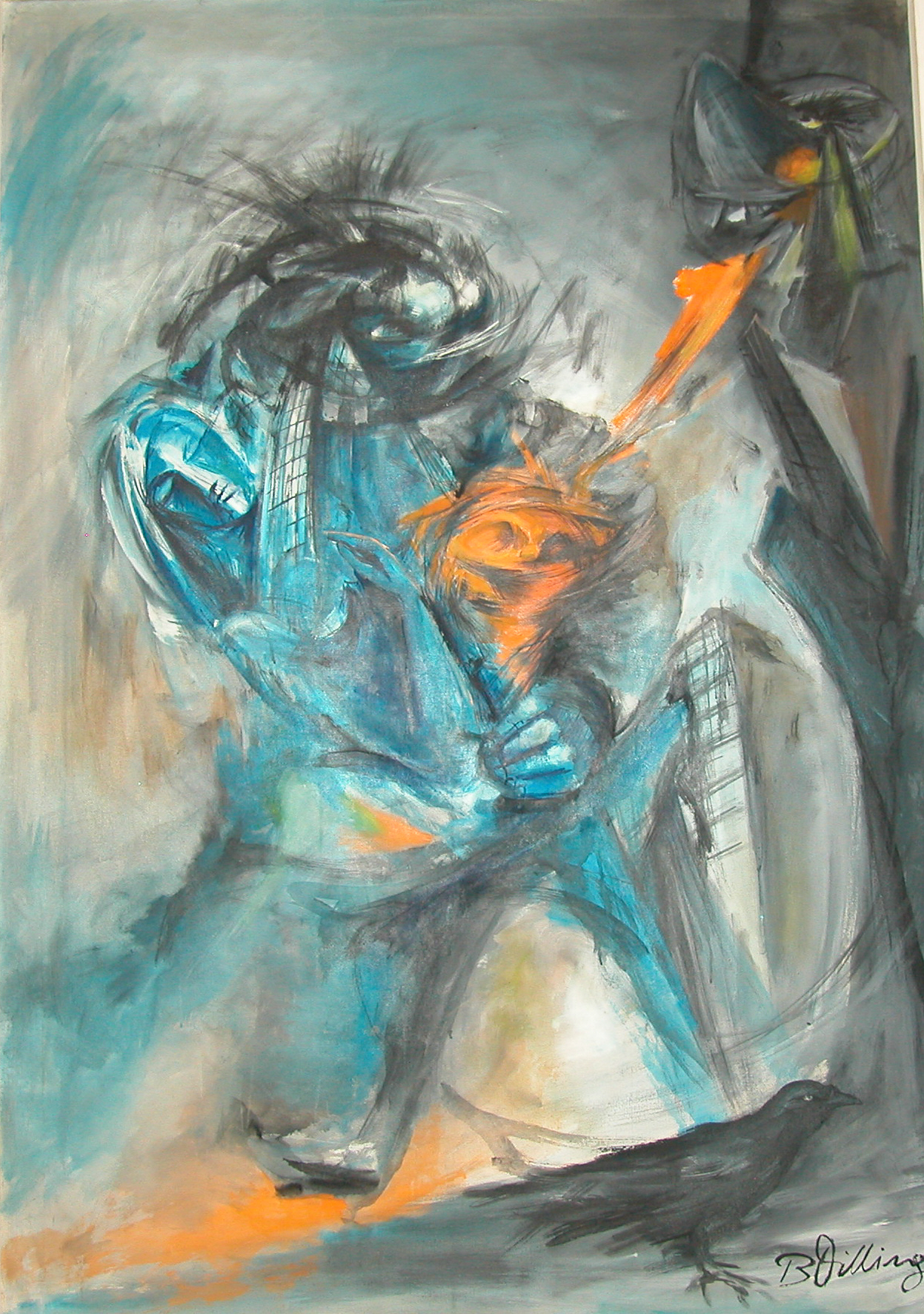
Die blaue Liebe, 1964

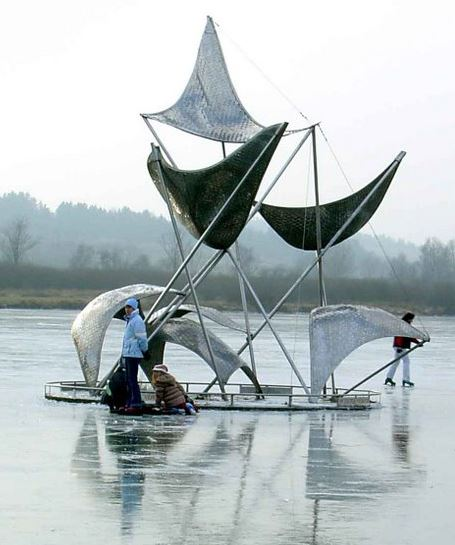
floating sculptur Wind und Wellen, 1980, near Postmünster

== Life ==
Bernhard "Hadti" Dilling attended art school in Augsburg from 1951 to 1952 in post war West Germany. From 1952 to 1957 he went on to study at the art academy in Munich visiting classes and works with Emil Pretorius and Helmut Jürgens in graphics, sculpture and stage design, both becoming very influential in his future works. While still a student, in October 1956, Dilling won third prize in an international poster competition organized by the Süddeutsche Zeitung. And in November 1956 he won first prize in a German poster competition.

After a apprenticeship at the Munich Kammerspiele, he was subsequently enployed as a stage designer, working at several theatres. Between 1957 and 1962 he worked at the Stadttheater Basel in Switzerland. Amongst a variety of productions, he here worked closely with the opera singer Grace Bumbry on the production of the opera Samson and Delilah and also with the Ukraine ballet master Waclaw Orlikowsky on the production of the opera Swan Lake. From 1962 to 1963 he worked at the Hessisches Staatstheater Wiesbaden and from 1963 to 1966 at the Theater Münster. In Münster he was responsible for designing the stages for numerous opera, operetta and drama productions.

In 1967 he started his career as a freelance artist in Schapdetten near Münster. From 1969 Dilling lived and worked in his birthplace of Pfarrkirchen, from about 1971 in the neighboring municipality of Postmünster. In his artistic work he uses various techniques, such as oil on canvas, screen printing, reverse glas painting, graphics and lithography. He is although known for his sculptures.

Bernhard Dilling died in the spring of 1994 at the age of 61 in Pfarrkirchen.

== Exhibitions ==
- 1968: Academy Franz-Hitze-Haus, Münster
- 1994: ‘’From the Celts to Technology’’ – City Hall, Landshut
- 1999: ‘’Cruel Century – Technology’’, Blessing or Destruction - City Hall, Landshut
- 2001: ‘’TRI ART’’ – Hadti Dilling, Petra Widermann and Alois Demlehner – Heimathaus, Pfarrkirchen
- 2008: Artrium, Bad Birnbach
- 2012: Former City Hall, Pfarrkirchen
- 2024: Archivgalerie, Friedberg
- 2025: ARTRIUM, Bad Birnbach

== Works (selection) ==
in public space

- 1978 Fountain at the school in Falkenberg, Rottal-Inn
- 1980 Wind and waves - sculpture on the Rottauensee, Postmünster, Rottal-Inn

as a stage designer

- Thierry Maulnier: The Empty Shell, spoken theatre, Hessisches Staatstheater Theater Wiesbaden, 1962/1963.
- René de Obaldia: Genousien, drama, German premiere, Hessisches Staatstheater Wiesbaden, January 1963.
- Paul Hindemith: Cardillac, opera, world premiere of the revised version, Theater Münster, 1964.
- Franz Lehár: The Land of Smiles, operetta, Theater Münster, 1965
- Giuseppe Verdi: Il trovatore, opera, Theater Münster, 1965
- Richard Strauss: Arabella, opera, Theater Münster, 1965.
- Daniel Auber: Fra Diavolo, opera, Theater Münster, 1965.
- Franz Lehár: The Count of Luxembourg, operetta, Municipal Theater Münster, 1966.
- Giacomo Puccini: Tosca, opera, Hessisches Staatstheater Wiesbaden, October 23, 1966.

== Literature ==
- Dr. Hans Buchner. "In seinen Bildern lebt er weiter: Hadti Dilling". Heimatkundlicher Informationsdienst. 15, 1996. OCLC 643925083.
- Dr. Hans Buchner (2023-06-01). "Ein Maler, der etwas zu sagen hat. Zu entdecken: Bernhard „Hadti" Dilling". Literatur in Bayern. 152. Munich: Allitera: 41–44.
- Dr. Manfred Riegger (2025-01-01). "Höre mit dem Ohr des Herzens! Entdeckungen mit Bildern des Künstlers Hadti Dilling" (PDF). Praedica Verbum. 130. Augsburg: Bistum Augsburg: 3–27.
- Dr. Martin Ortmeier (2025-06-26). "Mensch vor Landschaft – Skepsis bei Hadti Dilling". Passauer Kunst Blätter. 2/2025. Passau: Kunstverein Passau: 8-9.
