= Annette Reber =

German stage director and dramaturge (1964-2008)

- Born: 1964; East Berlin
- Died: 13 January 2008 (aged 43); Berlin, Germany
- Education: Humboldt University
- Occupations: Author; Stage director; Dramaturge
- Organizations: Deutsches Theater; Maxim Gorki Theater

Annette Reber (1964 – 13 January 2008) was a German author, stage director and dramaturge, especially active at the Deutsches Theater Berlin ant the Maxim Gorki Theater there.

== Life and career ==
Reber was born in East Berlin in 1964, the daughter of Heinz-Florian Oertel, a sports journalist. She studied theatre studies at the Humboldt University. She left the German Democratic Republic (GDR) in 1987 and moved to Vienna, where she further studied theatre but also arts and Slavic languages. After German reunification she returned to Berlin. She worked at Deutsches Theater Berlin until 2000, and then at the Maxim Gorki Theater as chief dramaturge. She worked as a guest stage director at the Volkstheater Rostock.

She edited the memoirs and texts by Eberhard Esche in 2007, with whom she had a son. Her third husband was the actor and stage director Alexander Lang.

== Death ==
She died on 13 January 2008 at age 43 after a severe illness. She was buried, named Annette Lang, in the Friedhof Pankow III cemetery.

== Publications ==
- Ein Stolz, der groß ist: letzte Worte / Eberhard Esche. [ed. von Annette Reber]. Berlin: Eulenspiegel-Verlag, 2007. ISBN 978-3-359-01671-7.
