= Johannes Bobrowski =

German lyric poet, narrative writer, adaptor and essayist

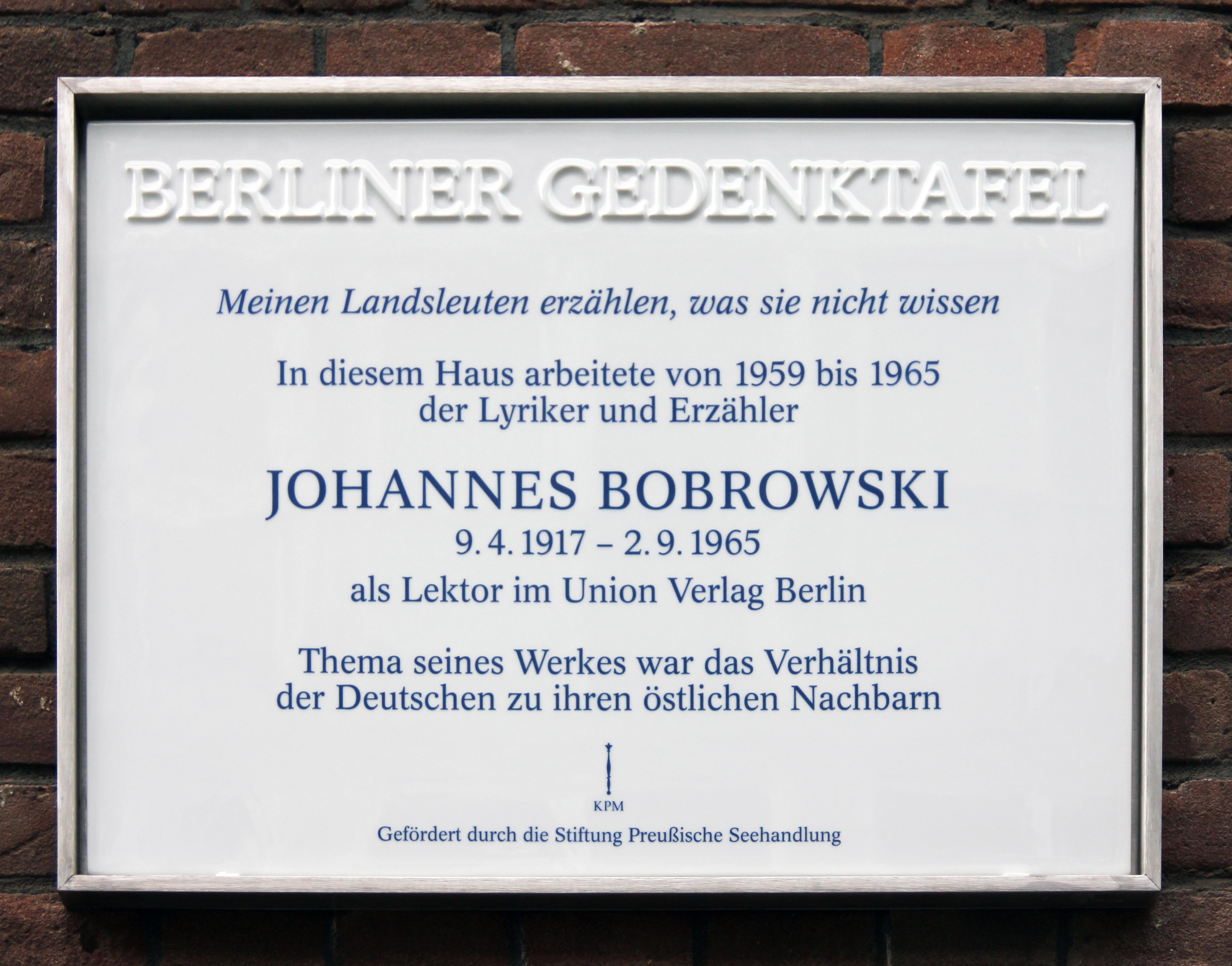
Berlin memorial plaque, Johannes Bobrowski, Zimmerstraße 80, Berlin-Mitte, Germany

Johannes Bobrowski (originally Johannes Konrad Bernhard Bobrowski; 9 April 1917 – 2 September 1965) was a German lyric poet, narrative writer, adaptor and essayist.

== Life ==
Bobrowski was born on 9 April 1917 in Tilsit in East Prussia. In 1925, he moved first to Rastenburg, then in 1928 on to Königsberg, where he attended the Gymnasium. One of his teachers was Ernst Wiechert. In 1937, he started a degree in art history at the Humboldt University in Berlin. As a member of the Confessing Church, Bobrowski had contact with the German resistance against National Socialism. He was a lance corporal for the entire Second World War in Poland, France and the Soviet Union. In 1943 he married Johanna Buddrus.

From 1945 to 1949 Bobrowski was imprisoned by the Soviet Union, where he spent time working in a coal mine. On his release, he returned home to his family in the suburban Berlin district of Friedrichshagen, in the Soviet occupation sector of Berlin. He worked as an editor, first for the Altberliner Verlag, a children's publisher run by Lucie Grosner, and then, from 1959 on, for the Union Verlag publishing house.

Bobrowski's work was influenced by his knowledge of Eastern European landscapes and of the German, Baltic, and Slavic cultures and languages, combined with ancient myths. His first poems were published during the war, in 1944, in the Munich-based journal Das innere Reich.

In 1960 he read his poems at a meeting in Aschaffenburg, Bavaria, of the influential West German literary association Group 47 (Gruppe 47). The following year his first book of collected poems, Sarmatische Zeit (Sarmatian Times), was published in both West and East Germany. After having missed the fall 1961 meeting of the Group 47, since it took place just after the building of the Berlin Wall, he was able to attend the subsequent meeting, held in October 1962 at the Wannsee, in West Berlin. On that occasion he read seven poems from those that would later appear in his collection Wetterzeichen (Weather signs), and was awarded the group's prestigious literary prize.

In 1964, Bobrowski became a member of the PEN Club.

Bobrowski died as a result of a perforated appendix in East Berlin on 2 September 1965, and was buried in the Friedrichshagen cemetery. Since 1992, the Foundation for Prussian Maritime Trade (Stiftung Preußische Seehandlung) has donated funds towards the Johannes Brobrowski Medal.

== Literary works ==
- Sarmatische Zeit (The Land of Sarmatia), poems, 1961
- Schattenland Ströme (Shadowland), poems, 1962
- Levins Mühle, 34 Sätze über meinen Großvater (Levin's Mill,34 Stories About My Grandfather ) novel, 1964
- Boehlendorff und Mäusefest, Short stories, 1965
- Litauische Claviere (Lithuanian Pianos), novel, 1966
- Wetterzeichen (Weathersigns), poems, 1967
- Der Mahner" (The Admonisher), short stories, 1967 translated by Marc Linder into English with "Boehlendorff und Mausefest" as "I Taste Bitterness" in 1970
- Im Windgesträuch (In the windy wilderness), poems chosen by Bobrowski's literary executor, 1970

=== Translations into English ===
- Shadow Land, Selected poems, translated by Ruth Mead & Matthew Mead, Donald Carroll, 1966
- Levin's Mill, Novel, translated by Janet Cropper, Calder & Boyars, 1970
- Johannes Bobrowski & Horst Bienek, Selected poems, translated by Ruth Mead & Matthew Mead, Penguin, 1971
- From the Rivers, A second selection of poems, translated by Ruth & Matthew Mead, Anvil, 1975
- Shadow Lands, re-edited version of Shadow Land and From the Rivers with an introduction by Michael Hamburger, Anvil, 1984
- Darkness and a Little Light, Stories, translated Leila Vennewitz, New Directions, 1994

== Films ==
- Levins Mühle (Levin's Mill), filmed in 1980 by Horst Seemann for DEFA film studios, with Erwin Geschonnek, Christian Grashof and Katja Paryla.
- Grüsse aus Sarmatien für den Dichter Johannes Bobrowski (Greetings from Sarmatia for the Poet Johannes Bobrowski),1973 – Short film by Volker Koepp

== Opera ==
- Levins Mühle (Levin's Mill) by Udo Zimmermann, premiere in 1973, produced by Harry Kupfer

== Prizes ==
- Alma Johanna Koenig Prize, 1962
- "Group 47" prize, 1962
- Heinrich Mann Prize, 1965, for Levins Mühle (Levin's Mill)
- International Charles Veillon Prize, 1965
- F. C. Weiskopf Prize, 1967

== About Bobrowski and his work ==
- Dietmar Albrecht, Andreas Degen et al. (eds): Unverschmerzt. Johannes Bobrowski – Leben und Werk. Munich 2004.
- Andreas Degen: Bildgedächtnis. Zur poetischen Funktion der Sinneswahrnehmung im Prosawerk Johannes Bobrowskis. Berlin 2004.
- Sabine Egger: Dialog mit dem Fremden. Erinnerung an den "europäischen Osten" in der Lyrik Johannes Bobrowskis. Würzburg 2009. ISBN 978-3-8260-3952-2
- Eberhard Haufe: Bobrowski-Chronik. Daten zu Leben und Werk. Würzburg 1994.
- Christoph Meckel: Erinnerung an Johannes Bobrowski. Munich, Vienna 1989.
- Bernd Leistner: Johannes Bobrowski – Studien und Interpretationen. Berlin 1981
- Gerhard Rostin (ed.): Ahornallee 26 oder Epitaph für Johannes Bobrowski. Stuttgart 1978. ISBN 3-421-01831-6
- Gerhard Rostin (ed.) Johannes Bobrowski – Selbstzeugnisse und neue Beiträge über sein Werk. Berlin 1975
- Gerhard Wolf: Beschreibung eines Zimmers – 15 Kapitel über Johannes Bobrowski. Berlin 1975, Stuttgart 1972
- Gerhard Wolf: Johannes Bobrowski – Leben und Werk. Berlin 1967
- A more extensive bibliography can be found on (in German) Die Johannes Bobrowski Gesellschaft e.V.
