= Wolfgang Trampe =

German writer, actor, and journalist (1939–2025)

- Born: 1 January 1939; Berlin, Germany
- Died: 5 June 2025 (aged 86); Berlin, Germany
- Education: Ernst Busch Academy of Dramatic Arts; University of Rostock
- Occupation(s): Writer; Actor; Journalist

Wolfgang Trampe (1 January 1939 – 5 June 2025) was a German writer, actor, and journalist.

== Biography ==
Born in Berlin on 1 January 1939, Trampe studied at the Ernst Busch Academy of Dramatic Arts and the University of Rostock. He began working for the publisher Aufbau Verlag before becoming an independent author in 1977.

Wolfgang Trampe died on 5 June 2025, at the age of 86.

== Filmography ==
- Rosenthaler Straße 51 (1977, actor)
- Your Unknown Brother (1982, screenwriter)
