= Annemarie Jürgens =

Argentinian-German actress and singer (1910–1988)

Annemarie Jürgens (5 July 1910 – 11 April 1988) was an Argentinian-German stage actress and soprano.

== Life and career ==
Annemarie was born in Buenos Aires, Argentina. She practiced theater arts under the direction of Max Reinhardt at the Acting School of the German Theater in Berlin (German: Schauspielschule des Deutschen Theaters zu Berlin, now the Hochschule für Schauspielkunst Ernst Busch), which she graduated from in 1928.

She landed her first big role in Bochum, Germany, and in 1931 she married Hans Graf von Schwerin, another actor, in Düsseldorf. From 1932 to 1946, she worked with the Düsseldorf Playhouse (German: Düsseldorfer Schauspielhaus), receiving critical enthusiasm especially for her roles as Solveig in "Peer Gynt", as Klärchen in "Egmont", and as Gretchen in "Faust". Playing the role of Ophelia, she was a guest in a stage production of Hamlet (1937) with Gustaf Gründgens.

In 1946, she joined the Komische Oper Berlin, where she worked as a soprano opera singer until her return to Düsseldorf in 1955. She continued her work on stage until 1968, when she had to leave due to her development of Parkinson's disease. She worked as a reciter and theater teacher in Düsseldorf until her death in 1988.

While involved in the Komische Oper, Annemarie was known for her comedic talent alongside her voice. One of her roles was Eurydice in the satirical operetta Orpheus in the Underworld (German: Orpheus in der Unterwelt) by Jacques Offenbach. She also played the role of Sari in a radio production of "The Gypsy Virtuoso" (German: “Der Zigeunerprimas") by Emmerich Kálmán.

== Theater ==
- 1931: Mysis in Die Matrone von Ephesus (Konzerthaus Berlin), Text: Gotthold Ephraim Lessing
- 1934: Solveig in Peer Gynt (Düsseldorf Playhouse), Dir: Hannes Küpper, Stage Design: Helmut Jürgens
- 1937: Gretchen in Faust (Düsseldorf Playhouse), Dir: Peter Esser, Stage Design: Walter von Wecus
- 1942: Oretta in Florentiner Brokat (Düsseldorf Playhouse), Text: Giovacchino Foranzo, Stage Design: Toni Steinberger, Costume: Gretl Altvater
- 1948: Eurydice in Orpheus in the Underworld (Komische Oper Berlin), Music: Jacques Offenbach, Music Dir: Leo Spies
- 1954: Annina in Eine Nacht in Venedig (Komische Oper Berlin), Music: Johann Strauss, New Edition: Walter Felsenstein

== Film and radio ==
- 1949: Sari in Der Zigeunerprimas (Nordwestdeutscher Rundfunk), Music: Emmerich Kálmán
- 1952: Kurfürstin in Die schöne Tölzerin, Dir: Richard Häussler, Screenplay: Peter Ostermayr and Karl Weinberger
