= Harish Shankar (conductor) =

Malaysian-German conductor (born 1984)

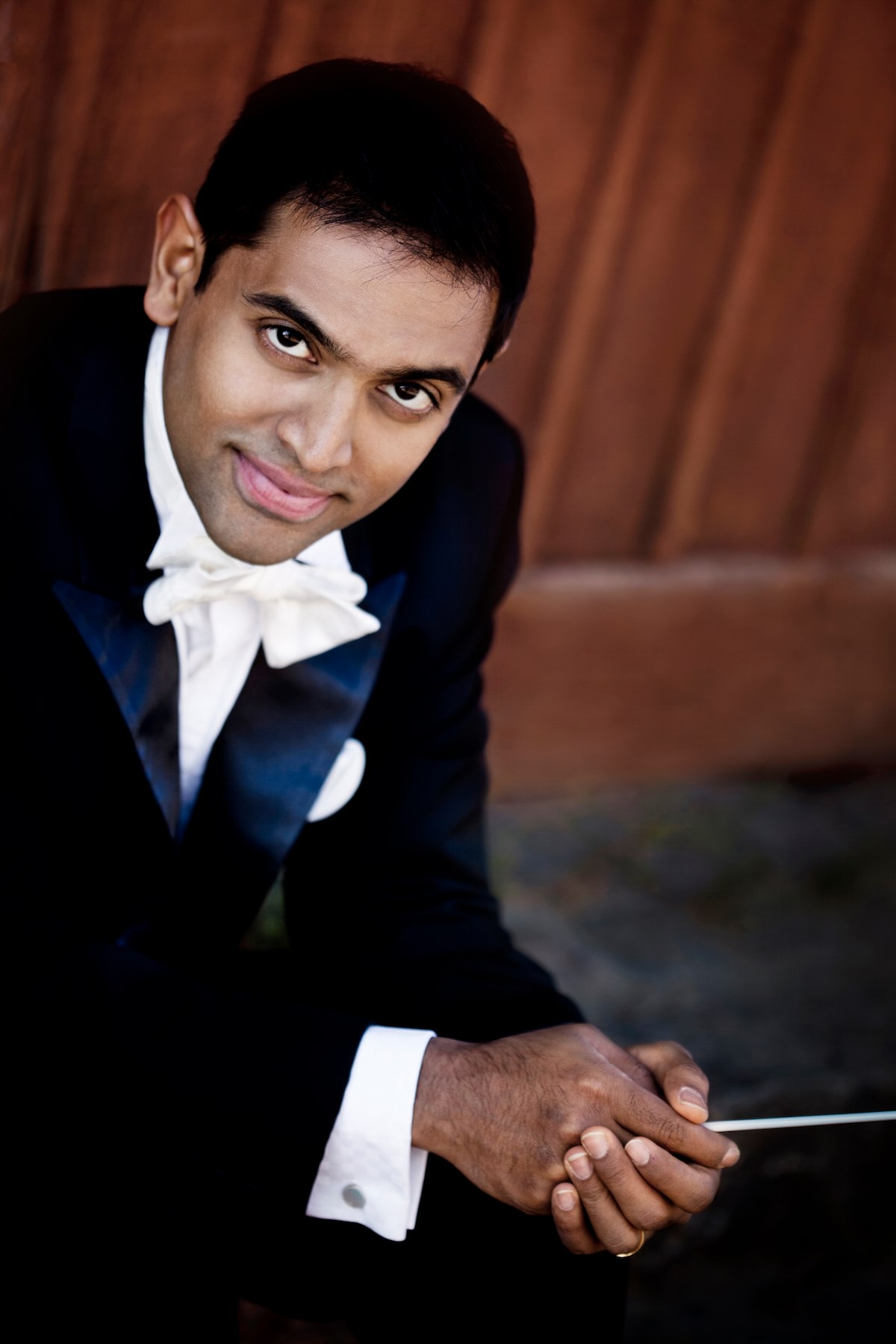
Harish Shankar

Harish Shankar (born 1984 in Malaysia) is a Malaysian-German conductor.

== Life ==
Shankar was born in Penang, Malaysia. He first studied piano in Lübeck with Konstanze Eickhorst and later conducting with Eiji Oue in Hanover and with Gunter Kahlert in Weimar. Prior to joining the master's programme in Weimar, he led the "Orquesta de Barro" in Trujillo, Perú in 2011.

Shankar led the Harvestehude Symphony Orchestra in Hamburg from 2013 to 2016 and held the position of "Junior Fellow in Conducting" at the Royal Northern College of Music in Manchester in 2014/2015. In 2016/2017, he was Resident Conductor of the Malaysian Philharmonic Orchestra and subsequently First Kapellmeister at the Theater Vorpommern in 2017/2018.

In 2015 he was awarded the third prize at the Jorma Panula conducting competition in Vaasa, Finland.

In 2019 Shankar was appointed First Kapellmeister at the Meiningen State Theatre. At the start of 2024/2025 Shankar was appointed general music director of the Landestheater Schleswig-Holstein with a home base in Flensburg.
