= Alexander Lang =

German actor and stage director (1941–2024)

- Alexander Lang, c. 1970
- Born: 24 September 1941; Erfurt, Gau Thuringia, Germany
- Died: 31 May 2024 (aged 82); Berlin, Germany
- Education: National Theatre School
- Occupations: Actor; Theatre director
- Organizations: Deutsches Theater; Thalia Theater; Schillertheater
- Spouse: Annette Reber
- Children: 3

Alexander Lang (24 September 1941 – 31 May 2024) was a German actor and stage director. He began his career, first as an actor, in East Berlin, at the Maxim Gorki Theater, the Berliner Ensemble from 1967, and the Deutsches Theater from 1969 where he played leading roles and then moved to stage direction.

Lang was director at the Thalia Theater in Hamburg from 1988. He worked as a guest at theatres and festivals in Germany, Austria and the Netherlands; he was invited three times to direct at the Comédie-Française in Paris.

Lang was regarded as an influential director, especially known for productions of works from the German classical period by Goethe, Schiller, Lessing and Kleist among others, with "a new, authentic approach". His most famous film role was the philosopher Ralph in Konrad Wolf's 1980 Solo Sunny.

== Life and career ==
Lang was born in Erfurt, Germany, on 24 September 1941; His father was an architect. He attended the Humboldt-Schule there. In 1961 he embarked on an apprenticeship as a sign and poster designer in 1961. From 1962 Lang worked as a stage technician at the Theater Erfurt. He then studied from 1963 to 1966 the State Theatre School in East Berlin, together with Jenny Gröllmann and Renate Krößner.

=== Acting ===
During his final year of study, Lang was the narrator in the play Der Schuhu und die fliegende Prinzessin by Peter Hacks. He went to work for Wolfram Krempel at the Maxim Gorki Theater in Berlin in 1966, moved soon to the Berliner Ensemble in 1967, and to the Deutsches Theater in 1969, where he built his reputation as an actor.

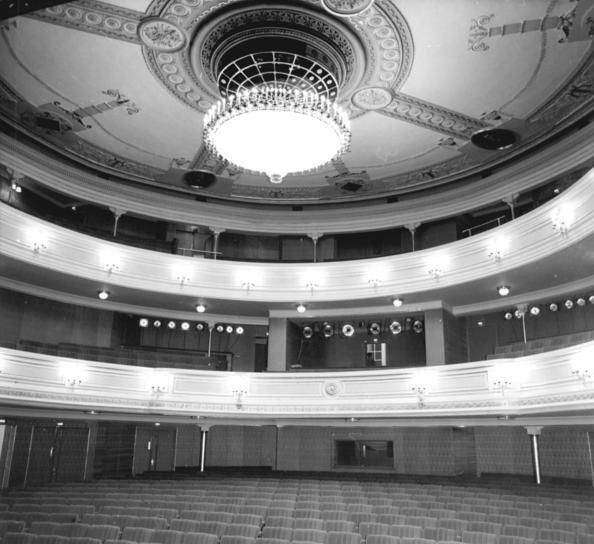
Hall of Deutsches Theater

His first major role there was Ferdinand in Schiller's Kabale und Liebe in 1972, and his pure unconditional passion divided the critics; some were enthusiastic while others thought that after Brecht, emotions on stage were embarrassingly private. He then played Paul Bauch in Volker Braun's Die Kipper in 1973, Caliban in Shakespeare's The Tempest in 1974. He played the title role in Kleist's Der Prinz von Homburg in 1975, which was regarded as an extroardiny portrayal of a Prussion officer who misses happiness for duty, directed by Andreas Dresen. Lang appeared in the title role in Heiner Müller's Philoktet in 1977. He appeared in the title role in the monumental production of Goethe's Faust II, staged in 1983 by Friedo Solter, alongside Dieter Mann as Mephisto.

Lang's film and television appearances were relatively infrequent, including a prominent role, the philosopher Ralph in Konrad Wolf's 1980 film Solo Sunny, alongside Krößner, and the title role in Peter Vogel's television adaptation of Stephan Hermlin's short story Der Leutnant Yorck von Wartenburg in 1981.

=== Directing ===
Lang began directing drama productions at Deutsches Theater in the late 1970s; when the directors of Philoktet opposed his ideas for the title role and resigned in 1977, Lang and his colleagues Christian Grashof and Roman Kaminski took over and presented the play as a teamwork.

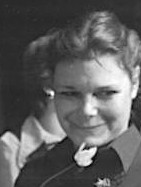
Actress Katja Paryla, also Lang's partner

Actors in Lang's ensemble included also Margit Bendokat, Michael Gwisdek, Dieter Montag and Katja Paryla. He directed Horribilicribrifax by Andreas Gryphius in 1978 and Ernst Toller's Der entfesselte Wotan in 1979. He staged Shakespeare's Ein Sommernachtstraum in 1980, with Bendokat, Paryla, Kaminski and Mann. In Büchner's Dantons Tod in 1981, he let Grashof play both Danton and Robespierre, showing for the first time on a GDR stage that the revolution ate its children. Lang directed Heinrich Mann's Traurige Geschichte von Friedrich dem Großen in 1982, Brecht's Die Rundköpfe und die Spitzköpfe in 1983 and Christoph Hein's Wahre Geschichte des Ah Q, both in 1983. After Dieter Mann became director of the theatre in 1984, Lang directed Goethe's Iphigenie auf Tauris, with Paryla in the title role, and Grabbe's Herzog Theodor von Gothland, with Grashof in the title role, that year, Johannes R. Becher's Winterschlacht with Mann in 1985, and a Trilogy of Passion consisting of Medea by Euripides, Goethe's Stella and Strindberg's Totentanz in 1986.

Lang said about his approach:

I am neither able nor willing to make a text the way it has supposedly been played for centuries, because that would be a kind of neutral historicism ... without obligation and doesn't hurt anyone. That would be an anti-realistic theater, because realism consists of telling fables and plays from today, from my world of experience, my knowledge, from the world situation. Otherwise I would turn the theater into a restorative-static institution, but theater is always a dynamic process – contemporary history always influences the history of interpretation... The focal point is the decoding for today.

The city of Berlin awarded its Goethe Prize to Lang in 1981. In 1985 he received the National Prize of East Germany, and in 1986 he became a member of the Academy of Arts.

In 1985 Lang directed for the first time in West Germany, Schiller's Don Karlos at the Münchner Kammerspiele. In May 1986 he announced that he was taking a three-year break from Deutsches Theater and worked as a guest director at the Kammerspiele, where he staged a double programme of Racine's Phèdre and Kleist's Penthesilea in 1987.Münchner Kammerspiele. His next planned production was a presentation of Wagner's Der Ring des Nibelungen at the Berlin State Opera, but this production was indefinitely postponed. In 1988 Lang returned to Munich and staged Bernard-Marie Koltès' In der Einsamkeit der Baumwollfelder.

In February 1988, Lang was recruited by Jürgen Flimm to the Thalia Theater in Hamburg, where he became the resident theatre director in succession to Jürgen Gosch. His first production there was Goethe's Clavigo in 1988. His next Hamburg productions were Rückkehr in die Wüste by Koltès in 1988 and Der Hofmeister by Jakob Michael Reinhold Lenz in 1989. In addition, in 1989, he worked at the Nederlands Toneel as a guest producer of Chekhov's Three Sisters.

Eight months before the fall of the Berlin Wall in November 1989, Lang had been able to cross the border to West Berlin where he took a job as senior director at the Schillertheater. He was simultaneously, with Alfred Kirchner, Volkmar Clauß and Vera Sturm, a co-director of the National Drama Theatre in East Berlin. He staged at the Schillertheater in 1989 Bernhard Minetti's Märchen in Deutschland based on fairy-tales of the Brothers Grimm as well as Schiller's Die Räuber. The following year, when Berlin was unified again, he presented a new production of Goethe's Iphigenie auf Tauris and another of Molière's Der eingebildete Kranke. He returned to Deutsches Theater in 1992 to stage Klaus Pohl's Karate-Billi kehrt zurück.

In 1993 the Schillertheater company closed down for financial reasons; shortly before. Lang directed at Deutsches Theater Oedipus Rex by Sophocles. and Goethe's Torquato Tasso, both in 1996, and Voltaire Rousseau by Jean-François Prévands in 2000..

=== As a guest director ===
Lang worked as a guest director with the Comédie-Française in Paris, staging Kleist's Der Prinz von Homburg in 1994, Lessing's Nathan der Weise in 1999, and Goethe's Faust I in 1999; he was the only German director to be invited three times. He also directed at the Kammerspiele, Herbert Achternbusch's Der letzte Gast in 1996, and at the Bregenzer Festspiele. At the Residenztheater he directed the world premiere of Tankred Dorst's comedy, Wegen Reichtum geschlossen in 1998, at the Schauspiel Leipzig Hebbel's Die Nibelungen in 2000, and at Nationaltheater Weimar Shakespeare's Hamlet in 2001. He directed several more productions at the Maxim Gorki Theater when Volker Hesse was general manager, Gorki's Nachtasyl in 2003, Ewers' Das Wundermärchen von Berlin in 2005 and Kleist's Der zerbrochene Krug in 2006.

Lang received the Konrad Wolf Prize from the Academy of Arts in 2020; The jury acknowledged his work, beginning as a spectacular young protagonist and then directing classical plays in "a new, authentic approach" with his "close-knit ensemble", inspiring with "comedic wit and enlightening fantasy". They noted his "defining influence from East to West".

=== Personal life and death ===
Lang lived with the actress Katja Paryla; they had a son. Lang was later married to Annette Reber, dramaturge of the Maxim Gorki Theater; she died in 2008 aged 43. He had a severe illness in the 2000s; he had no legs, lived in a wheelchair and withdrew from the public. He lived alone in Berlin-Pankow, with assistance.

Lang died at home on 31 May 2024, aged 82.
