= Maria Jeritza =

Czech dramatic soprano

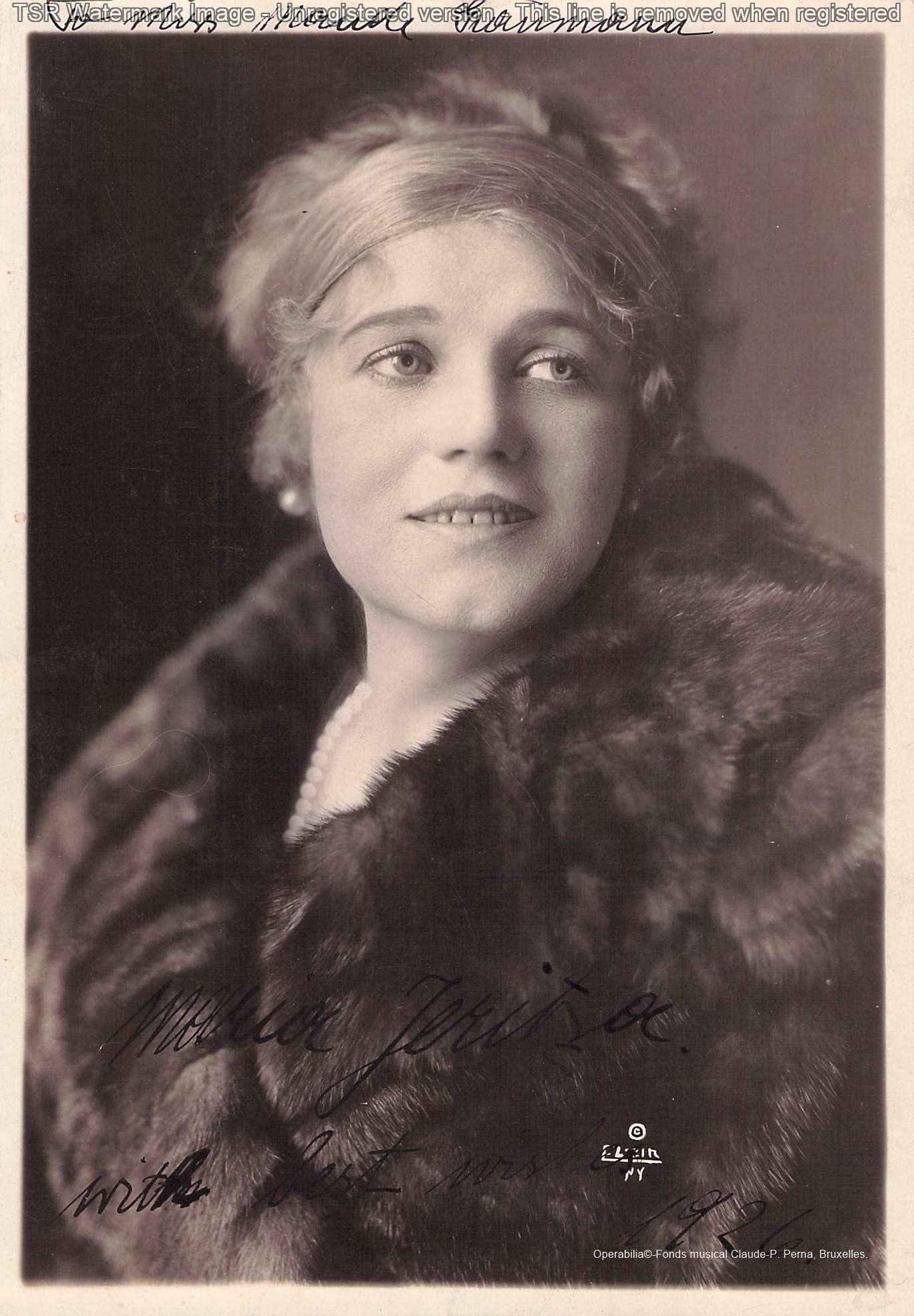
- Maria Jeritza
- Born: Marie Jedličková; 6 October 1887; Brno, Moravia, Austria-Hungary
- Died: 10 July 1982 (aged 94); Orange, New Jersey, U.S.
- Occupation: Operatic soprano

Maria Jeritza (6 October 1887 – 10 July 1982) was an Austrian-born American soprano. She was described by John Rockwell in The New York Times as a spinto soprano who was "the golden girl of opera's golden age". She enjoyed "mass adulation" from the public from the 1910s into the 1930s in what today could only be compared to that of a major rock or pop star. While she appeared at many theaters globally as a guest artist, her career was chiefly based in Vienna and New York City. She had a long association with the Vienna State Opera (1912–1935 and 1950–1953) and the Metropolitan Opera ("Met", 1921–1932 and 1951). She performed more than 60 roles during her career; 20 of which were sung at the Met. She is remembered today for originating roles in several notable operas; among them Ariadne auf Naxos and Die Frau ohne Schatten by Richard Strauss and Die tote Stadt by Erich Wolfgang Korngold. She was also the first singer to perform the title roles of Giacomo Puccini's Turandot and Leoš Janáček's Jenůfa in the United States.

Born with the name Marie Jedličková in what is today Moravia, she changed her name to Maria Jeritza in her early twenties. She began her career as a chorus girl at the Brno City Theatre in 1904, and performed her first leading role at the opera house in Olmütz in 1906. She subsequently performed at Theater Dortmund, the Munich Art Theatre, and the Vienna Volksoper before landing at the opera house of Bad Ischl where her performance captivated Franz Joseph I of Austria. At the emperor's insistence she was given a contract with the Vienna State Opera (VS0) in 1912 where her rapid rise to fame earned her the moniker "The Moravian Thunderbolt". She first came to New York's Met in 1921 where she was paid with a salary on par with Enrico Caruso and enjoyed a mass celebrity in the United States. Her love life and personal affairs were routinely followed in the press, as were reported feuds with rival singers and co-stars like tenors Alfred Piccaver and Beniamino Gigli, soprano Lotte Lehmann and mezzo Maria Olszewska. She married four times; including twice to Americans. Her third husband was the Fox Film Corporation mogul Winfield Sheehan. She became a naturalized American citizen and in her later life she lived in New Jersey where she died at the age of 94.

== Early life and education ==
Marie Marcellina Jedličková was born in Brno, Moravia, Austria-Hungary in what is now the Czech Republic on 6 October 1887. Her father worked as a hotel concierge, and the family was not well off financially. She began her musical training at the Brno Conservatory (German: Brünn Musikschule) where she first enrolled at the age of eleven. She also studied singing privately in Prague from 1900 to 1910; with Auspitz being one of her teachers in that city.

She continued to train with voice teachers throughout her career; including studying at the Vienna Academy of Music. She later was a pupil of first Marcella Sembrich and then Estelle Liebling in New York City. Sometime in her early 20s, she changed her name to Maria Jeritza.

== Early career in Europe ==
Multiple sources state that Jeritza made her debut as Elsa in Wagner's Lohengrin at the opera house in Olomouc in 1910. However, this is contradicted in the Großes Sängerlexikon which gives a history of performances over the six years prior to this. According to Karl-Josef Kutsch and Leo Riemens, Jeritza first performed professionally as a member of the chorus at the Brno City Theatre beginning in 1904. There she quickly progressed into singing minor parts in operettas. Her first leading role was as Elsa, but not in 1910 in Olomouc but in 1906 at the Mährisches Theater Olmütz.

In 1906–1907, Jeritza was a resident soprano at Theater Dortmund, and in 1909 she was committed to the Munich Art Theatre. While performing at the latter theatre she was scouted by Rainer Simons, director of the Vienna Volksoper (VV), who poached her for his theater. She have her performance at the VV as Elisabeth in Wagner's Tannhäuser, and performed as a member of that company for two years. She notably portrayed Blanchefleur in the premiere of Wilhelm Kienzl's Der Kuhreigen at the VV in 1911.

== Later career ==
=== Vienna and Strauss ===
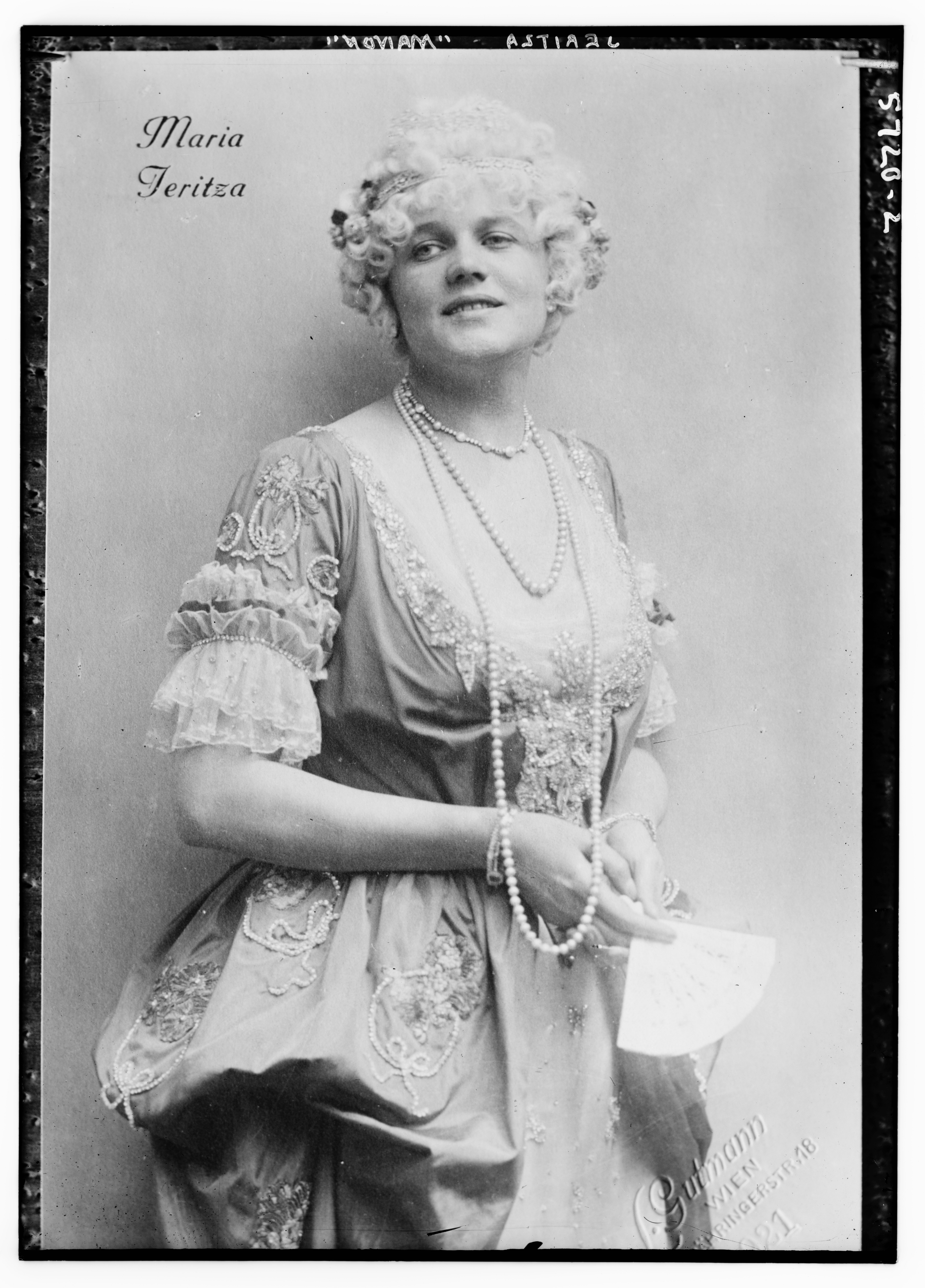
Jeritza as Manon.

Jeritza drew the attention of Franz Joseph I of Austria while starring as Rosalinda in a production of Die Fledermaus at the opera house of Bad Ischl. Her performance there entranced the emperor, and at his insistence she was given a contract with the Vienna State Opera (VSO, then known as the Vienna Hofoper until the end of the Austrian empire in 1918). She made her debut with that company in the title role of the world premiere of Max von Oberleithner's Aphrodite which was given on 16 March 1912. This was soon followed that same year by a performance of Minnie in the first staging in Vienna of Giacomo Puccini's La fanciulla del West. She rapidly became a house favorite, and her sudden rise to super stardom in Vienna gained her the moniker "The Moravian Thunderbolt". She a regular performer at the VSO through 1935.

Not long after her debut at the VSO, Jeritza began an association of long standing with composer Richard Strauss. On 25 October 1912 she created the role of Ariadne in the world premiere of Strauss's Ariadne auf Naxos at the Staatsoper Stuttgart; a role she later repeated for the premier of its revised version at the VSO in 1916. She later performed the role of the Empress in the premiere of Strauss's Die Frau ohne Schatten at the VSO in 1919. At the VSO she was highly lauded for her portrayal of the title role in Strauss's Salome. Strauss composed the song "Malven" (1945) for her.

Jeritza performed more than 60 different opera parts at the VSO during her career. Some of the other parts she sang in Vienna included Brünnhilde in Die Walküre, Carlotta Nardi in Die Gezeichneten, Senta in The Flying Dutchman and the title roles in Manon and Fedora. While she mainly retired from the stage in 1935, Jeritza later performed in charity concerts for the VSO in the 1950s in order to raise funds to assist the theatre which had been badly damaged during World War II.

=== Die tote Stadt and New York ===
In 1920 Jeritza portrayed the secondary role of Juliette in the world premiere of Korngold's Die tote Stadt at the Hamburg State Opera. She subsequently assumed the leading role of Marietta/Marie in this same opera for its first staging at the VSO in January 1921, and for her debut at the Metropolitan Opera (the "Met") on 19 November 1921. From this point on she divided her time equally between appearing on the VSO and Met stages. In 1924 she performed the title role in the United States premiere of Leoš Janáček's Jenůfa; a work she had previously sung for its Vienna premiere in 1918.

Jeritza performed the title characters in several United States premieres given at the Met; including Puccini's Turandot (16 November 1926), Korngold's Violanta (5 November 1927) and Strauss's Die Ägyptische Helena (6 November 1928). Her most frequently performed roles at the Met were Elisabeth in Tannhäuser, Elsa von Brabant in Lohengrin, Minnie in La fanciulla del West, Octavian in Der Rosenkavalier, Santuzza in Cavalleria rusticana, Sieglinde in Die Walküre, Turandot, and the title role in Tosca. In 1931 she had a triumph at the Met in the title part of Suppé's Boccaccio. She also sang the title parts in the Met's first stagings of Wolf-Ferrari's I gioielli della Madonna (1925), and Suppé's Donna Juanita (1932).

Other roles Jeritza sang at the Met included Brünnhilde in Die Walküre, and the title roles in Bizet's Carmen and Massenet's Thaïs. These latter two roles and the part of Tosca were considered some of her best roles on the Met stage. Brünnhilde was the heaviest role she sang during her career, and she never tackled the larger dramatic repertoire. Her farewell appearance at the Met was as Wagner's Elisabeth on 12 February 1932; although she returned for a single performance years later in February 1951 as Rosalinda in Die Fledermaus that was given to raise funds for the Met.

=== Other work ===
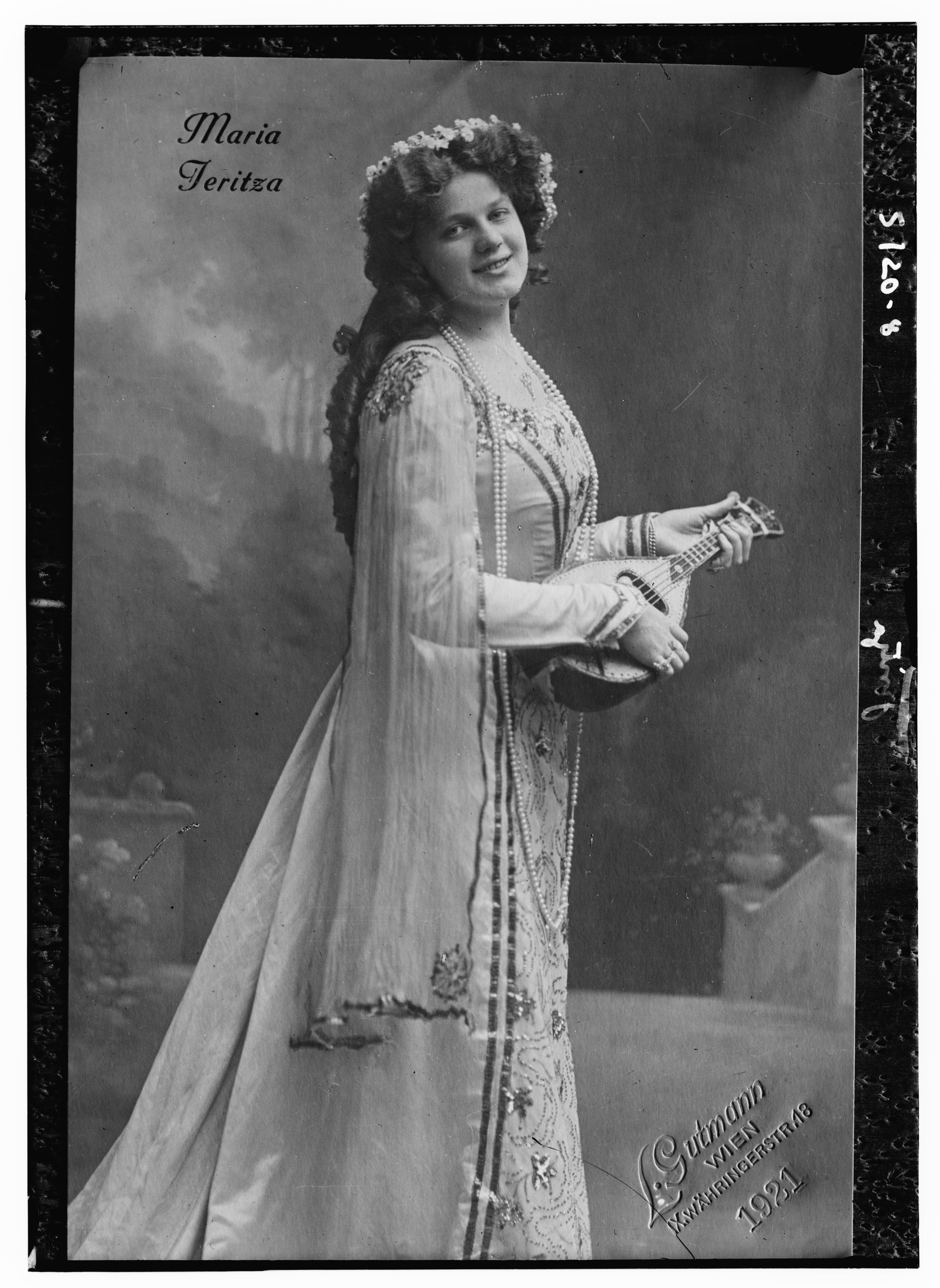
Jeritza as Marguerite in Faust.

Jeritza periodically appeared as a guest artist at opera houses in Denmark, England, France, Hungary, and Russia during her career. Some of the theaters she appeared as a guest artist at included the Berlin State Opera, Hungarian State Opera House, the Odesa Opera and Ballet Theatre, Prague State Opera, the Royal Swedish Opera, and Theater Bremen. She performed at the Royal Opera House in Covent Garden in a total of seven roles in the years 1925–1926. In 1928 she performed the role of Tosca at the Paris Opera. She also gave multiple European and North American concert tours during her career.

She starred in an early sound film Grossfürstin Alexandra (1933) for which Franz Lehár wrote the song "Du und ich sind für einander bestimmt".

Jeritza made a number of 78-rpm recordings which testify to the high quality of her voice. Many of these recordings have been released on CD.

== Critical reception ==
Music historian Marcel Prawy described Jeritza as "the prima donna of the [twentieth] century". Karl-Josef Kutsch and Leo Riemens stated that "Jeritza was one of the greatest singers of her time. Besides the brilliance of her voice, people admired the passionate drama of her delivery and her unparalleled stage presence."

Music critic John Rockwell stated that Jeritza was "an artist in the Callas mold [who] was never afraid to sacrifice bel canto beauty of tone for dramatic effect." Desmond Shawe-Taylor wrote that "Though endowed with an ample and lustrous voice, Jeritza belonged to the category of artist known as a 'singing actress', freely yielding both dramatically and vocally to impulses that were sometimes more flamboyant than refined. In her numerous recordings, faults of taste and technique co-exist with genuine vocal achievements."

== Personal life and death ==
Jeritza married her first husband, the factory owner Friedrich Wiener, in 1907. Their marriage ended in divorce eight years later in 1915. She married her second husband, the Austrian businessman Baron Leopold von Popper de Podhurgen (1886–1986), in 1919. He was the son of the singer Blanche Marchesi. This marriage also ended in divorce in 1934.

Jeritza became a naturalized American citizen, and in 1924 she published her memoirs Sunlight and Song. On 12 August 1935 she married her third husband, Hollywood mogul Winfield Sheehan of the Fox Film Corporation. They remained married until his death in 1945. In 1948 she married New Jersey businessman Irving B. Seery, and remained married to him until his death in 1966. She and Irving lived in a mansion in the Forest Hill neighborhood of Newark, New Jersey, where she lived until her death at the age of 94.

Jeritza died at St. Mary's Hospital in Orange, New Jersey on 10 July 1982. A Roman Catholic, she was buried at Holy Cross Cemetery in North Arlington, New Jersey.
