= Leopold Popper-Podhragy =

Austrian banker

Leopold Popper-Podhragy (born 17 September 1886 in Vienna; died 17 January 1986 there) was an Austrian private banker and art collector who was looted by the Nazis.

== Life ==
Leopold was born as the first son of the Jewish timber industrialist Alexander Freiherr Popper von Podhragy and his French wife and opera singer Blanche Marchesi in Vienna and was probably named Leopold in memory of his grandfather Leopold Freiherr Popper von Podhragy.

In 1919 he married the opera diva Maria Jeritza.

In 1924 he and his wife Maria Jeritza bought the run-down Hatzlhof in Unternberg in St. Corona am Wechsel and had a Maierhof built and the Unternberg Castle built from 1924 to 1926. They had a significant art collection. It included works by Waldmüller, such as Gebirgslandschaft mit Haus

=== Nazi Persecution ===
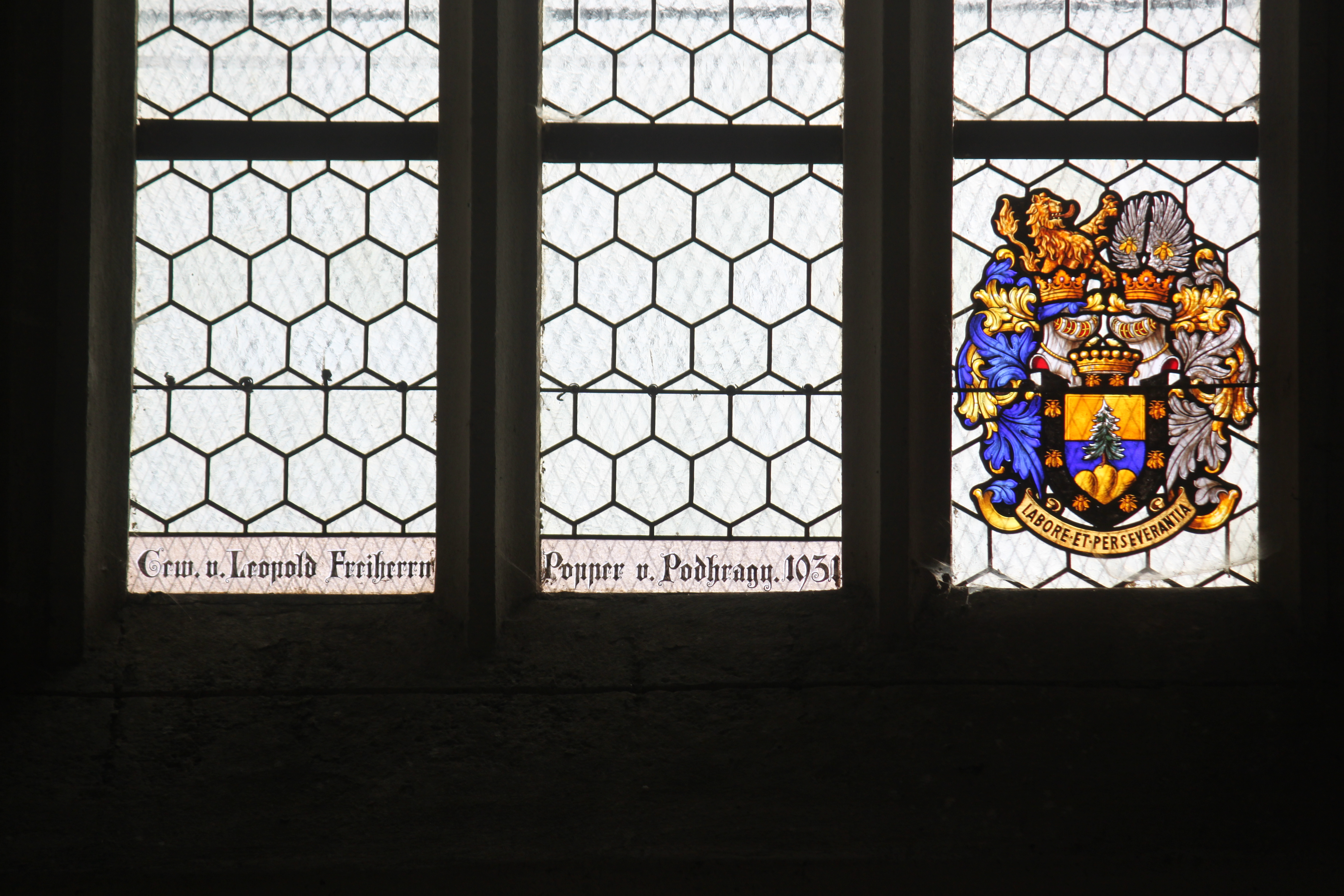
Stained glass window in the Wolfgang Church (Kirchberg am Wechsel) with the name Leopold Freiherr Popper von Podhragy. 1931, with coat of arms

When Austria was annexed to Hitler's Germany, Leopold Popper-Podhragy was classified as a so-called "half-Jew" and arrested several times by the Gestapo. According to the study by Sophie Lillie "Was einmal war - Handbuch der entteigneten Kunstsammlungens Wien ", the assets of Leopold Popper-Podhragy were confiscated as enemy property within the framework of a Nazi guardianship procedure.

On 15 July 1939 he managed to escape to London via Paris. He was sentenced to death in absentia and most of his property was Aryanized, that is transferred to non-Jews.

Leopold Popper had two brothers, Ernst (12 March 1891 - January 1978) and Fritz. Ernst was deported to the Dachau concentration camp, and after his release he fled to the USA. Fritz survived, but his apartment was taken. Together the three brothers owned almost half of Schafberg. During the Nazi era, the plots of land were placed under "absent guardianship" or administered by "disposition agents" and the city acquired the properties on extremely favorable terms.

=== Postwar ===
In 1951, Leopold Popper-Podhragy returned to Austria from exile in England. Only a small part of his former fortune was returned to him. He married Maria Bachner from Neunkirchen a second time.

In 1983, the 96-year-old baron sold Unterberg Castle and all of his property in St. Corona am Wechsel and only lived in Vienna.

== Awards ==
- 1928 Ehrenbürger von St. Corona am Wechsel
