= Der Zigeunerprimas =

Operetta composed by Emmerich Kálmán

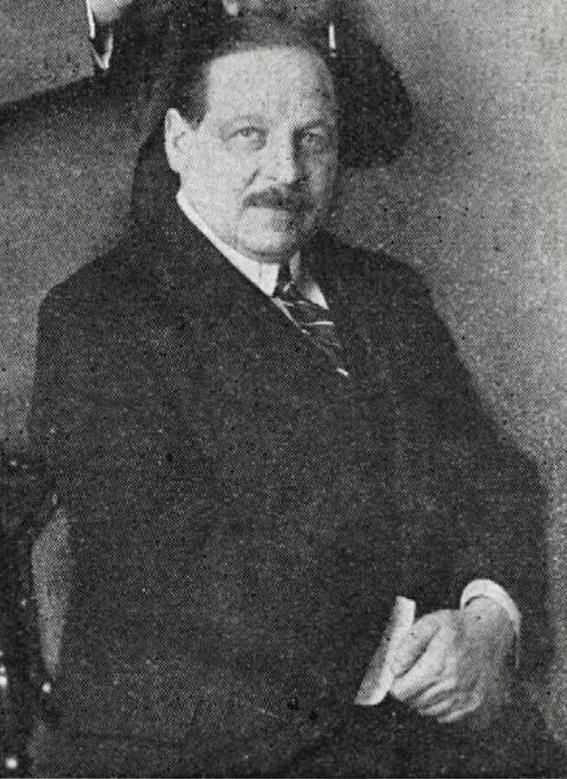
Emmerich Kálmán

Der Zigeunerprimas (The Gypsy Band Leader, known as Sari and The Gypsy Virtuoso in English speaking countries) is a three-act operetta, which was composed by Emmerich Kálmán. The libretto was written by Julius Wilhelm and Fritz Grünbaum. It premiered at the Johann Strauß Theatre in Vienna on 11 October 1912.

In 1929 it was adapted into a German silent film The Gypsy Chief directed by Carl Wilhelm.

== Roles ==
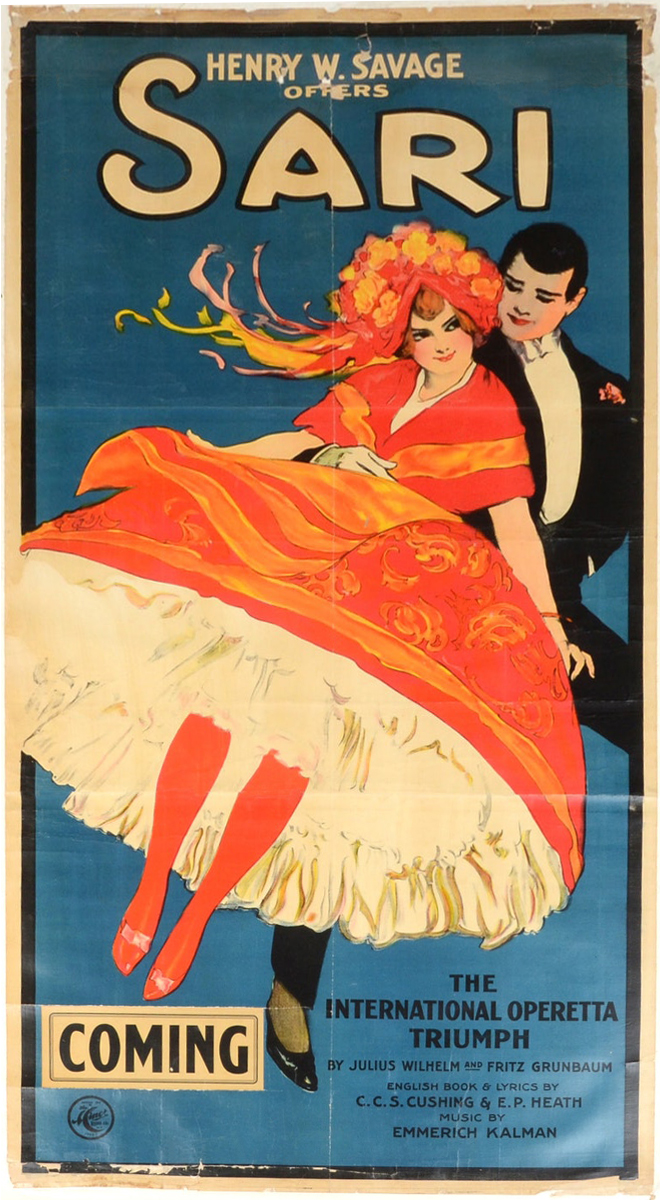
Poster for Sari, the 1914 Broadway adaptation of Der Zigeunerprimas, presented by Henry W. Savage

Roles, voice types, premiere cast
Role	Voice type	Premiere cast, 11 October 1912
Pali Rácz, a Gypsy violinist and orchestra leader	tenor	Alexander Girardi
Laczi, Pali's son	tenor	Willy Strehl
Sári, Pali's daughter	soprano	Grete Holm
Juliska Racz, Pali's niece	soprano	
Gaston, Count Irini	baritone	Max Brod
King Heribert VII, disguised as Count Estragon	baritone	Josef Victora

== Synopsis ==
Pali Rácz, a thrice-widowed gypsy violinist, is adored by women and hailed widely as a virtuoso. His daughter Sari cares for their large family. His young son Laczi is also a violinist, but has chosen to forsake his father's playing style and study classical violin at the Academy of Music. Pali wants to marry his niece, Juliska, as a companion in his old age, but she prefers his son, Laczi, and Laczi, in turn, loves her. Pali criticizes Laczi's musical talent so much, and Laczi yearns so for Juliska, that he leaves home. Reunited in Paris, father and son reconcile after Countess Irini, an old admirer, convinces Pali not to interfere with the course of Laczi and Juliska's relationship. Irini's grandson marries Sari.

== Recordings ==
- Josef Metternich, Julius Katona, Annemarie Jürgens, Liselotte Losch, Daue, Willy Hofmann – Westdeutscher Rundfunk – Franz Marszalek – 1949
- Thompson, Meacham, Lengfelder – Ohio Light Opera – McMahon – 2001 (0098).
- Gabriele Rossmanith, Edith Lienbacher, Roberto Saccà, Wolfgang Bankl; Claus Peter Flor – Classic Produktion Osnabrück 058-2-2003

== Radio adaptation ==
Sari was presented on The Railroad Hour on 17 March 1952. Baritone Gordon MacRae and soprano Margaret Truman starred in the episode, which also featured Carmen Dragon's orchestra and Norman Luboff's chorus.

== Sources ==
- Myers, Eric (October 1, 2002). "Kalman: Der Zigeunerprimas". Opera News. Archived from the original on November 5, 2012 – via HighBeam Research.
