= Julien Dinou =

Swiss painter, actor and director

Arnold Neuweiler (16 August 1895 – 24 January 1983), known professionally as Julien Dinou, was a Swiss painter, actor, director, stage-manager, writer, and entrepreneur.

== Life ==
Julien Dinou was born in 1895 in Cairo, Egypt to Swiss parents. He studied chemistry at the University of Bern from 1910 to 1915, but before completing his scientific education, he reoriented himself towards the arts. From 1915 to 1917, he attended the acting school of the Deutsches Theaters (German: Schauspielschule des Deutschen Theaters zu Berlin). In 1917, he began working as a dramaturge at the Stadttheater Bremen. During this time, he wrote books on theater theory and practice. One such book was Massenregie (1919), dedicated to his teacher at the acting school, Berthold Held, in which he developed a theory of choirs and mass scenes in theater divided into the following aesthetic dimensions: expression, language, humanity, and interaction.

Dinou went back to Switzerland in 1933, taking over and expanding his father’s business, Neuweiler AG, which lay in the field of European railway construction. In the coming years, he took up an interest in painting and art history, possibly to balance his interests in art, science, and business. He started collecting paintings from Geneva, then published a book on Genevan art history in 1945. He began painting his own works around this time, and first started using the name Julien Dinou as a painter. His first exhibition was in Bern in 1951.

In order to pursue his artistic practice, he sold his rail company to Von Roll AG and moved to Paris in 1958. Dinou was an abstract impressionist, and he became good friends with fellow painters Otto Nebel and Paul Klee. Nebel invited him to be a member of the Otto Nebel Foundation, and Dinou was considered a disciple of Klee.

Dinou died in Bern in 1983 and is now listed in the Benezit Dictionary of Artists.

== Artworks (selection) ==
- La Maison du Pêcheur (Fisherman's house), oil on canvas, 1945
- Le voyage de noce (Honeymoon), oil on canvas, 1948
- Vitesse (Speed), oil on canvas, 1949
- Frauenkloster in Frankreich, undated (~1950), Swiss private collection
- Elle nous quitte (She left us), oil on canvas, 1950
- Jean parle dans les Désert (Jean speaks in the desert), oil on canvas, 1951, Swiss private collection
- Les Adieux (Goodbyes), oil on canvas. 1955
- Clairière en Seine et Oise, oil on board, 1958
- Au Dessus de L’Italie (Above Italy), oil on canvas, 1960
- Chantier à Londres (Construction in London), oil on canvas, 1960
- Kirchenfenster (Church window), England, oil on canvas, undated (~1961), Swiss private collection
- Matin en Seine & Oise, Paris, oil on canvas, 1962, Swiss private collection
- Walter †, oil on canvas, 1972
- Les Deux Villages (the two villages), oil on canvas, 1976, Swiss private collection

== Books (selection) ==
- Massenregie: Eine Studie über die Schauspielchöre, ihre Wirkung und ihre Behandlung (1919)
- Die Regie des Einzeldarstellers: Eine Studie über praktische Inszenierungsprobleme (1921)
- Almanac of the Bergische Bühnen-Blätter (1922)
- Painting in Geneva 1700–1900 (1945)
