= Gerhard Ebert =

German theatrologist (born 1930)

- Born: September 20, 1930 (age 95); Glauchau, Germany
- Occupations: Journalist; theatre scholar; theatre critic; dramaturge

Gerhard Ebert (born 20 September 1930 in Glauchau) is a German journalist, theatre scholar, theatre critic, and dramaturge.

== Life ==
After getting his Abitur (school qualification) and completing an apprenticeship as a typesetter, Ebert began theatre studies at the German Theatre Institute in Weimar in 1951. From 1955 to 1961, he was theatre editor at the weekly Sonntag. Afterwards, he worked as a senior assistant at the Hochschule für Musik "Hanns Eisler" (Hanns Eisler College of Music) until 1963. Following this, he was deputy director at the Staatliche Schauspielschule Berlin (Berlin State Drama School) until 1981. With its transformation into the Ernst Busch Academy of Dramatic Arts in 1981, Ebert became associate professor there and was also first prorector there from 1981 to 1988. He taught theory and history of theatre until 1992.

In 1977, Ebert was awarded a doctorate in physics from the Humboldt University of Berlin. His dissertation was titled Improvisation as an element of the basic methodological training of actors.

== Publications ==
- Improvisation und Schauspielkunst. Über die Kreativität des Schauspielers. Henschelverlag, Berlin 1979, ISBN 3-89487-172-5.
- Schauspielen – Handbuch der Schauspieler-Ausbildung. Henschelverlag, Berlin 1981 (edited with Rudolf Penka), ISBN 3-89487-294-2.
- Schauspieler werden in Berlin. Von Max Reinhardts Schauspielschule zur Hochschule für Schauspielkunst Ernst Busch. Berlin-Information, Berlin 1987, ISBN 3-7442-0012-4.
- Der Schauspieler. Geschichte eines Berufes. Ein Abriss. Henschel-Verlag, Berlin 1991, ISBN 3-362-00531-4.
- ABC des Schauspielens. Talent erkennen und entwickeln. Henschel-Verlag, Berlin 2004, ISBN 3-89487-474-0.
- Das utopische Theater, E-Book, 2014, ISBN 978-3-7380-0622-3

== Theatre reviews ==
- Sonntag 1955–1964
- Theater der Zeit 1975–1979
- Junge Welt 1979–1984
- Neues Deutschland 1984–2002

== Theatre plays ==
- Der wilde Mann (World premiere 1977 Parchim)
- Lust mit Liebe (World premiere 2002 Würzburg)
- Blutgeld (World premiere 2012 Cologne)
- Der Weltknoten
- Nämlich verheiratet
- Flaggenwechsel
- Die Serapionsbrüder
- Axel im Hexenkessel
- Die Frösch
