= Postmünster =

- Municipality
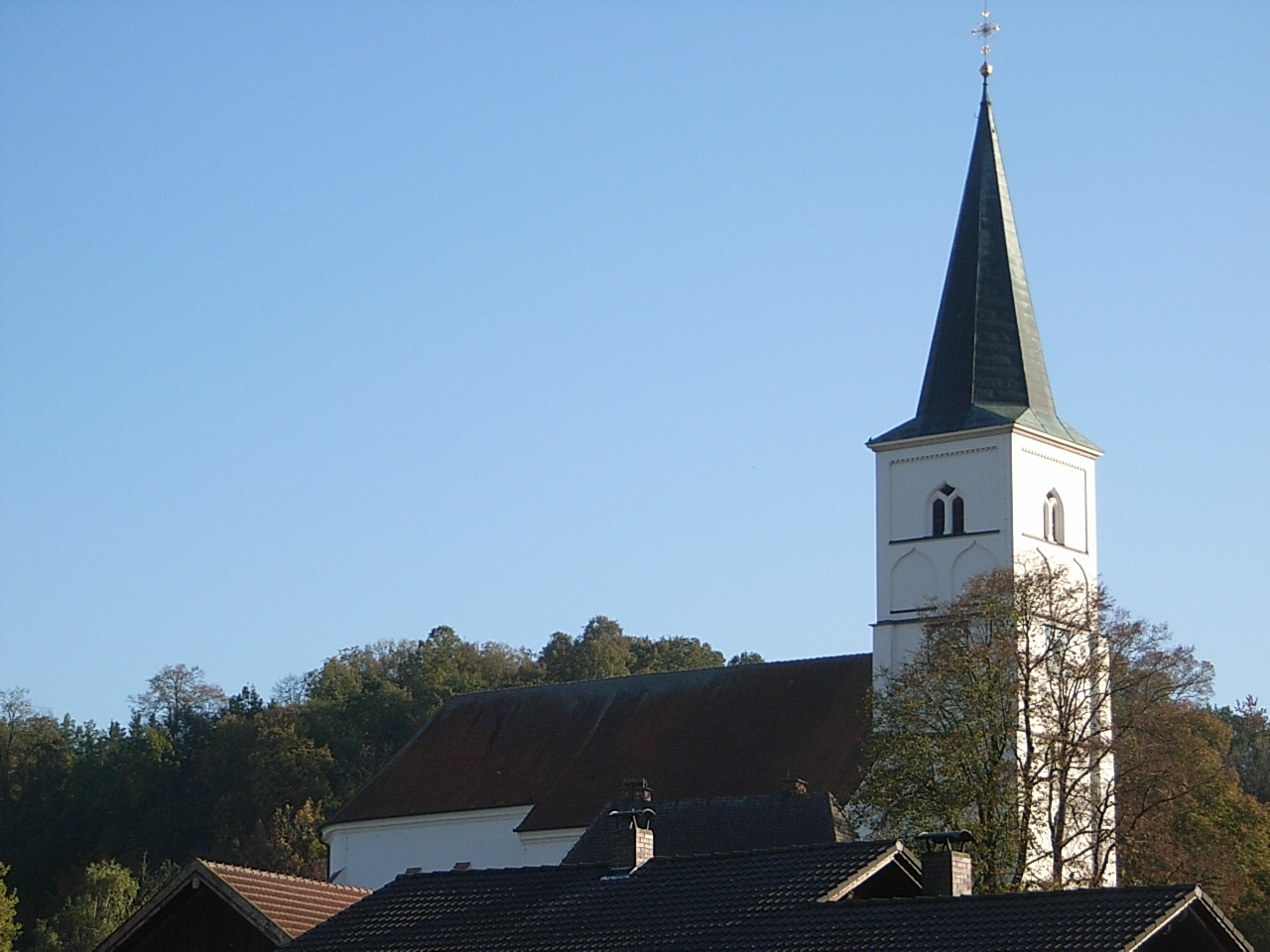
- Saint Benedict parish church

- Coat of arms

- Location of Postmünster within Rottal-Inn district
- Interactive map of Postmünster
- Location within Germany Location within Bavaria
- Coordinates: 48°25′N 12°54′E
- Country: Germany
- State: Bavaria
- Admin. region: Niederbayern
- District: Rottal-Inn

Government
  - Mayor (2020–26): Stefan Weindl (CSU)

Area
  - Total: 43.5 km^{2} (16.8 sq mi)
- Elevation: 378–472 m (1,240–1,549 ft)

Population (2025-12-31)
  - Total: 2,450
  - Density: 56.3/km^{2} (146/sq mi)
- Time zone: UTC+01:00 (CET)
  - Summer (DST): UTC+02:00 (CEST)
- Postal codes: 84389
- Dialling codes: 08561
- Vehicle registration: PAN
- Website: www.postmuenster.de

Postmünster (German pronunciation: [ˈpɔstˌmʏnstɐ]) is a municipality in the district of Rottal-Inn in Bavaria, Germany.
