= Gabriele Rossmanith =

German operatic soprano (born 1956)

Gabriele Rossmanith (born in 1956 in Stuttgart) is a German operatic soprano. She is particularly associated with the Hamburg State Opera where she first sang in 1988. Appearances there include the title role in Debussy's Pelléas et Mélisande.
