= Blanche Marchesi =

French opera singer

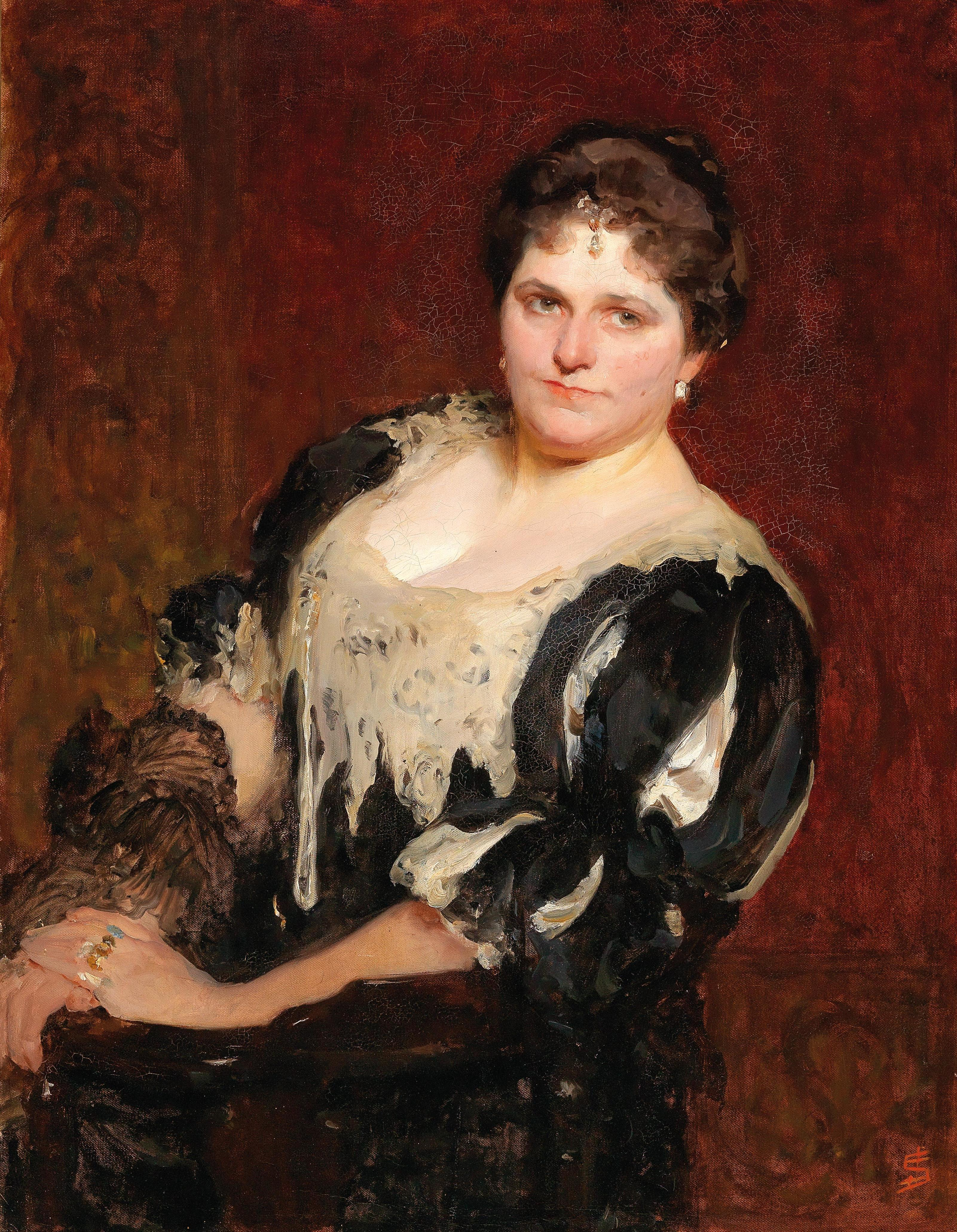
Portrait of Blanche Marchesi by Solomon Joseph Solomon

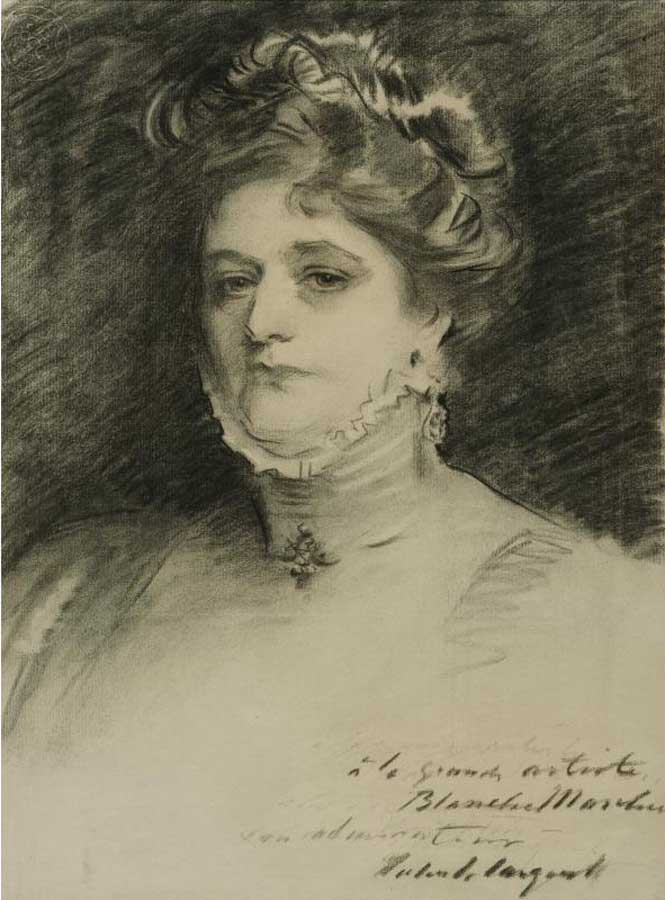
sketch of Marchesi by John Singer Sargent (c. 1910)

Blanche Marchesi (4 April 1863 – 15 December 1940) was a French mezzo-soprano or dramatic soprano and voice teacher best known for her interpretations of the works of Richard Wagner. She was the daughter of Mathilde Graumann Marchesi, a German voice instructor who taught a variety of well-known opera singers, including Emma Eames, Nellie Melba, and Emma Calvé.

== Early life and career ==
Marchesi was born in Paris in April 1863. She received her education at boarding schools in Frankfurt, German Empire and later in Paris. Initially trained as a violinist, she decided to pursue a singing career in 1881. Her debut concert took place at Queen's Hall in 1896. While opera critics at the time praised her interpretive ability, they criticized her technical skill. As a voice teacher, Marchesi instructed notable singers, including British contraltos Muriel Brunskill and Astra Desmond. In the 1890s, she premiered a work by Cécile Chaminade in England . Martin Shaw dedicated his song "Heffle Cuckoo Fair" to her. She held a farewell concert in 1938, two years before her death.

== Personal life ==
Marchesi had two sisters, Thérèse and Stella. Her parents were Mathilde Graumann Marchesi of Frankfurt and Salvatore de Castrone (Marchese di Palermo), an opera singer and a voice instructor, from whom she derived her stage name Marchesi. Her father was a key figure in the Italian Revolution of 1848 initiating the uprising at the Palazzo Raimondi in Milan. Marchesi was first married to Baron Alexander Popper von Podhragy, Vienna, with whom she had three sons: Leopold, Fritz and Ernst. After the annexation of Austria by the Nazi regime, Leopold was classified as so-called "half-Jew" and his property confiscated. In 1939, he managed to escape to London via Paris. His brother Ernst was deported to Dachau and later to Buchenwald, freed and fled to the United States of America. In her second marriage, Blanche Marchesi was married to Baron Andrea Auzon Caccamisi.

== Sources ==
- Singer's pilgrimage By Blanche Marchesi
- Bach Cantatas
