= Ernst Busch Academy of Dramatic Arts =

Arts university in Berlin, Germany

Coordinates: 52.532502°N 13.383292°E

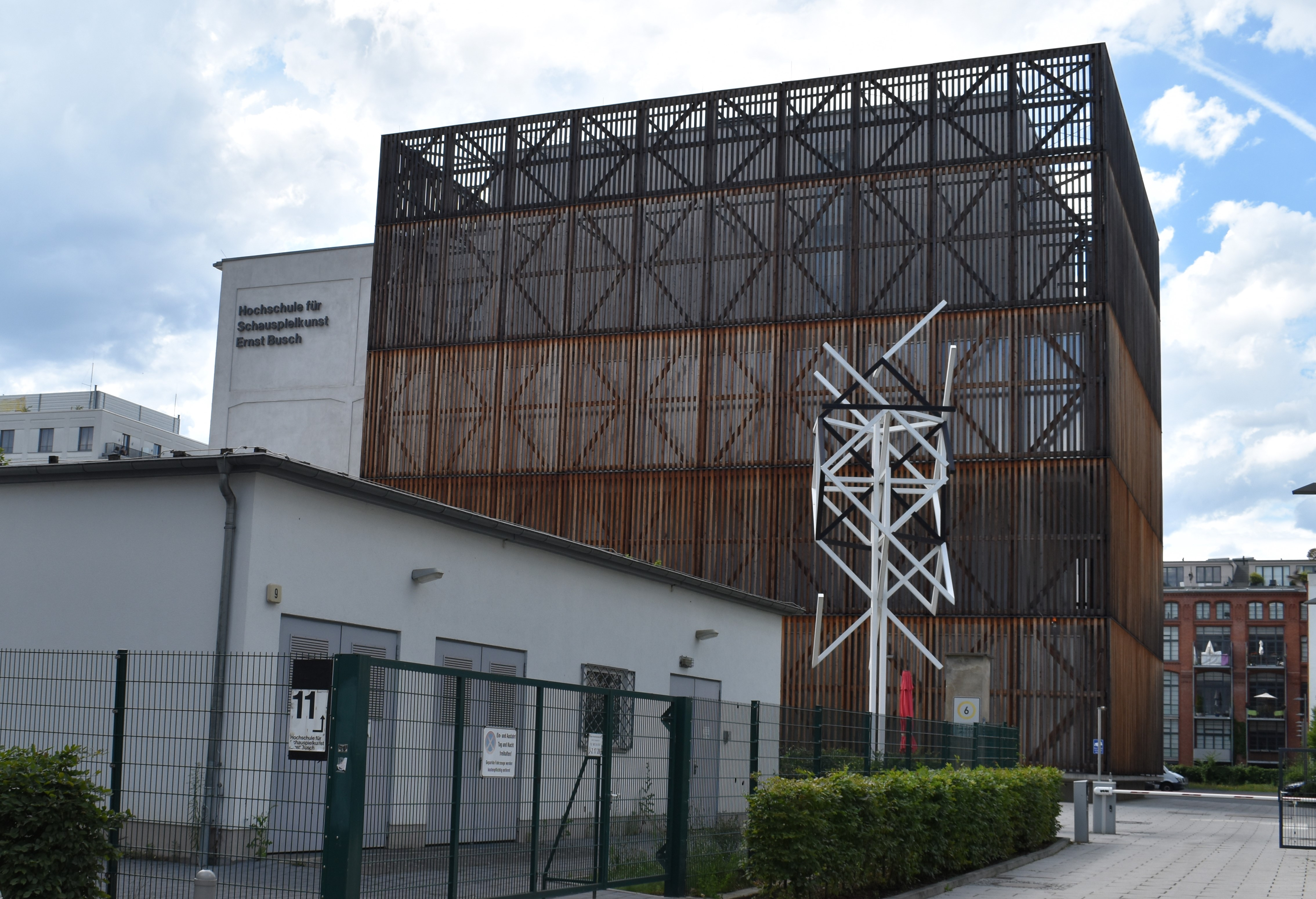
- Berlin; Germany

Information
- Former name: Staatliche Schauspielschule Berlin
- Type: Dramatic arts
- Established: 1951

The Ernst Busch Academy of Dramatic Arts (German: Hochschule für Schauspielkunst Ernst Busch, HFS), located in the Mitte district of Berlin, Germany, was founded in 1951 as the National Theatre School in Berlin with the status of college. In 1981, it was granted higher education status, and a year later, it was renamed after the East German singer and actor Ernst Busch.

== History ==
=== Origins: 1905–1945 ===
The origins of the university go back to the Max Reinhardt drama school established in 1905 at the Deutsches Theater Berlin. The first training facility was the ground floor of the Palais Wesendonkschen, where Reinhardt lived, near the Reichstag. In 1914, Reinhardt's childhood friend and fellow theatre artist Berthold Held became the school's first director.

Reinhardt emigrated in 1933, and the Nazis took over the theatre, along with the acting school. The director of the Deutsches Theater, Heinz Hilpert, secured subsidies for the first time in the school's history but struggled to keep the institution open. After 1945, Gustav von Wangenheim, back from exile in Russia, became director of the Deutsches Theater, shortly followed by Wolfgang Langhoff, who held the position for many years.

=== State drama school: 1951–1980s ===
The state drama school of Berlin was conceptually and legally established as a public institution in September 1951. In a conscious departure from previous practice, the somewhat remote training center known as the Old Boat House in Niederschöneweide, East Berlin, was selected. Work on a new building started in 1979 and was completed in 1981. During this time, the institution was in a school building in Marzahn.

=== 21st century: 2004–present ===
In 2004, the university won the Berlin Art Prize and became known for the documentary Addicted to Acting by Andres Veiel (1997–2004). The institute was awarded the 2010 Film Culture Award in Mannheim-Heidelberg, which the International Filmfestival Mannheim-Heidelberg grants to companies, institutions, and individuals who have rendered outstanding service continuously over many years to film culture in Germany.

In 2018, the academy relocated to the Mitte district of Berlin.

== Courses ==
The school teaches courses in drama, puppetry, directing, dramaturgy, choreography, and other subjects.

== Notable alumni ==
Reinhardt's students from 1905 to 1933 included:

- Ilse Baerwald
- Gerhard Bienert
- Alfred Braun
- Gisela von Collande
- Paul Dahlke
- Marlene Dietrich
- Friedrich Domin
- Berta Drews
- Carl Ebert
- Paul Graetz
- Alexander Granach
- O. E. Hasse
- Werner Hinz
- Marianne Hoppe
- Annemarie Jürgens
- Gerda Müller
- Renate Müller
- Lothar Müthel
- Arnold Neuweiler
- Friedrich Wilhelm Murnau
- Alice Treff
- Otto Wallburg
- Adolf Wohlbrück

Graduates from 1933 to 1950 included:

- Wilhelm Koch-Hooge
- Herbert Köfer
- Hans-Joachim Kulenkampff

Notable alumni since 1951 include:

- Doris Abeßer
- Sólveig Arnarsdóttir
- Ludwig Blochberger
- Renate Blume
- Marita Böhme
- Angela Brunner
- August Diehl
- Lars Eidinger
- Alexander Fehling
- Alexandra Finder
- Catherine Flemming
- Jenny Gröllmann
- Sylvester Groth
- Marie Gruber
- Michael Gwisdek
- Fritzi Haberlandt
- Helga Hahnemann
- Corinna Harfouch
- Janina Hartwig
- Leander Haußmann
- Jürgen Hentsch
- Karoline Herfurth
- Alwara Höfels
- Jens Hoffmann
- Nina Hoss
- Henry Hübchen
- Charly Hübner
- Sandra Hüller
- Rebecca Immanuel
- Julia Jentsch
- Felix Kammerer
- Manfred Karge
- Ursula Karusseit
- Gerit Kling
- Uwe Kockisch
- Niklas Kohrt
- Horst Krause
- Renate Krößner
- Ulrike Krumbiegel
- Steffi Kühnert
- Bernd Michael Lade
- Alexander Lang
- Lena Lauzemis
- Jan Josef Liefers
- Dieter Mann
- Dagmar Manzel
- Sven Martinek
- Claudia Michelsen
- Friedrich Mücke
- Thomas Neumann
- Thomas Ostermeier
- Franziska Petri
- Hans-Peter Reinecke
- Pierre Sanoussi-Bliss
- Jenny Schily
- Christine Schorn
- Uta Schorn
- Maria Simon
- René Steinke
- Devid Striesow
- Thomas Thieme
- Simone Thomalla
- Jördis Triebel
- Maria Wagner
- Mark Waschke
- Ursula Werner
- Ronald Zehrfeld

Jens Hoffmann enrolled but did not complete full training.

== See also ==
- Gerhard Ebert
