= Theatre of West Pomerania =

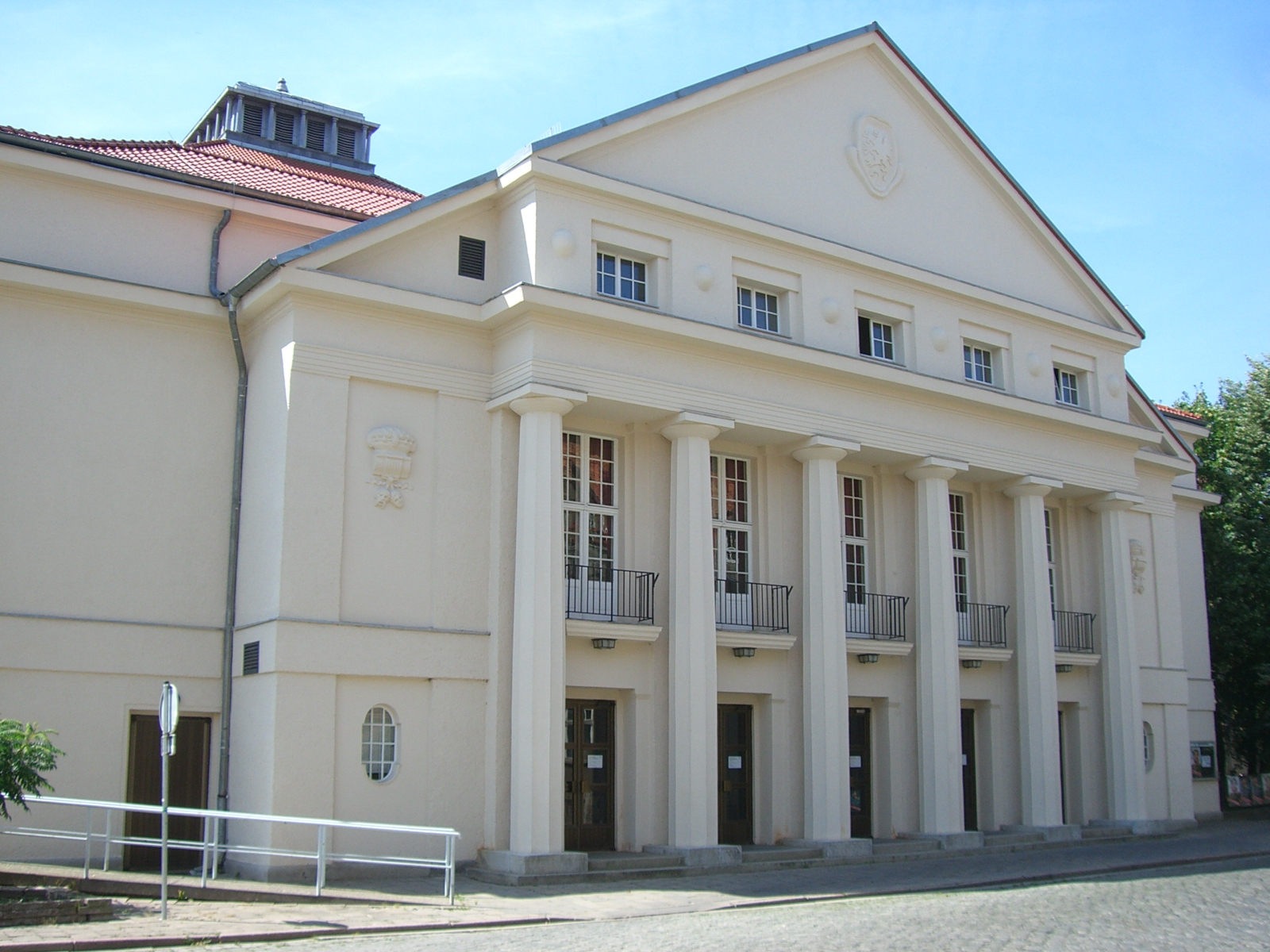
Theatre in Greifswald 54.09382°N 13.38904°E

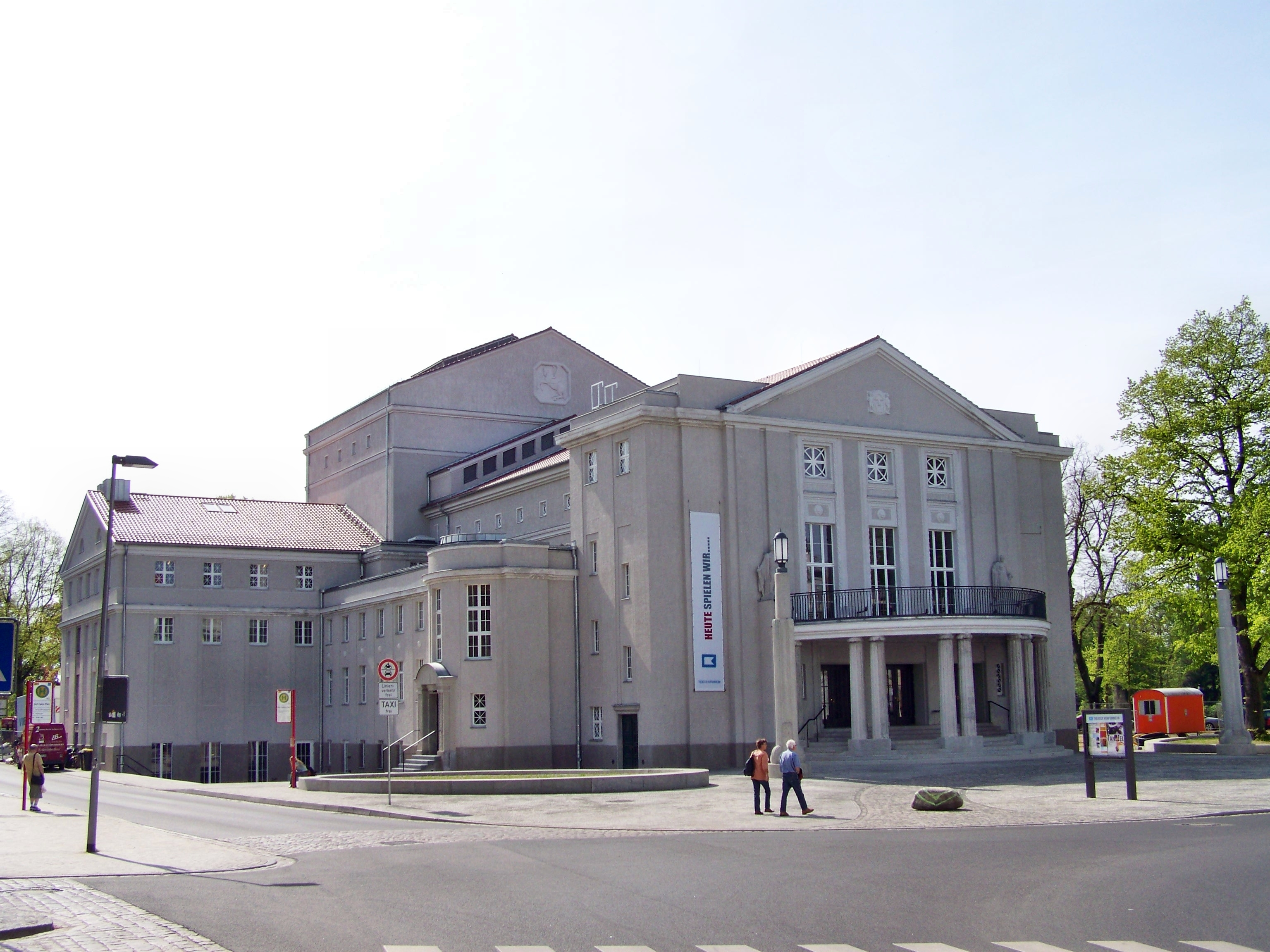
Theatre in Stralsund (2008) 54.317512°N 13.088719°E

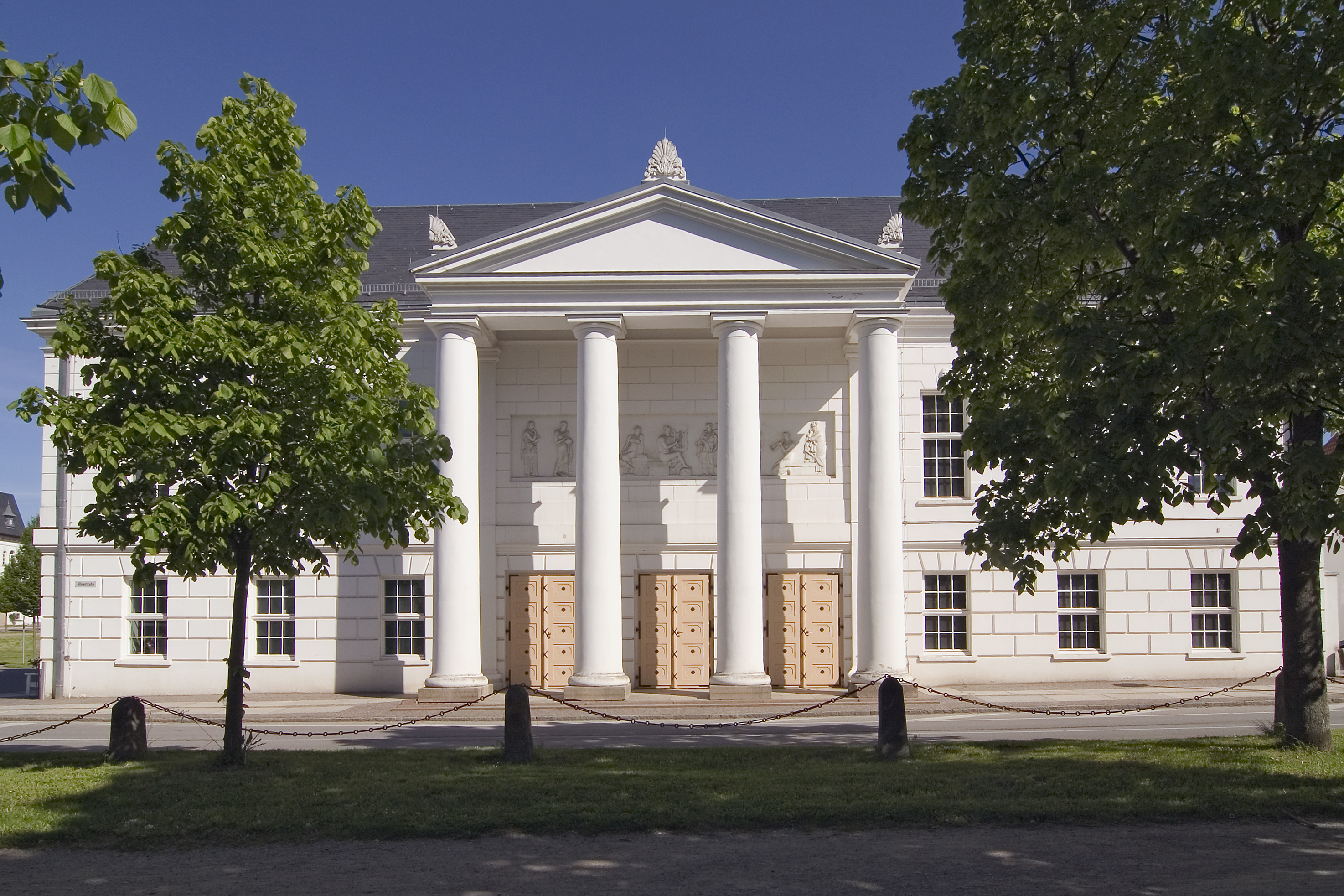
Theatre in Putbus 54.352779°N 13.469718°E

The Theatre of West Pomerania (German: Theater Vorpommern) is a theatre in the German state of Mecklenburg-Vorpommern that is operated legally as a GmbH, a form of public limited company. Its shareholders are the Hanseatic towns of Stralsund and Greifswald and the town of Putbus. The Theatre of West Pomerania puts on plays, ballets, concerts, operas, operettas and musicals.

Every year, in addition to the performances at their main sites, there are open air performances, the Baltic Sea Festivals (Ostseefestspiele) both in Stralsund (here on the old freighter, Ursula B. in Stralsund Harbour) as well as in Greifswald (on the Museum Harbour Stage, Bühne am Museumshafen, in the ruined Eldena Abbey and on the market place) and in other towns in Western Pomerania (Vorpommern).
