= Munich Art Theatre =

Former theater in Munich, Germany

- Münchner Künstlertheater
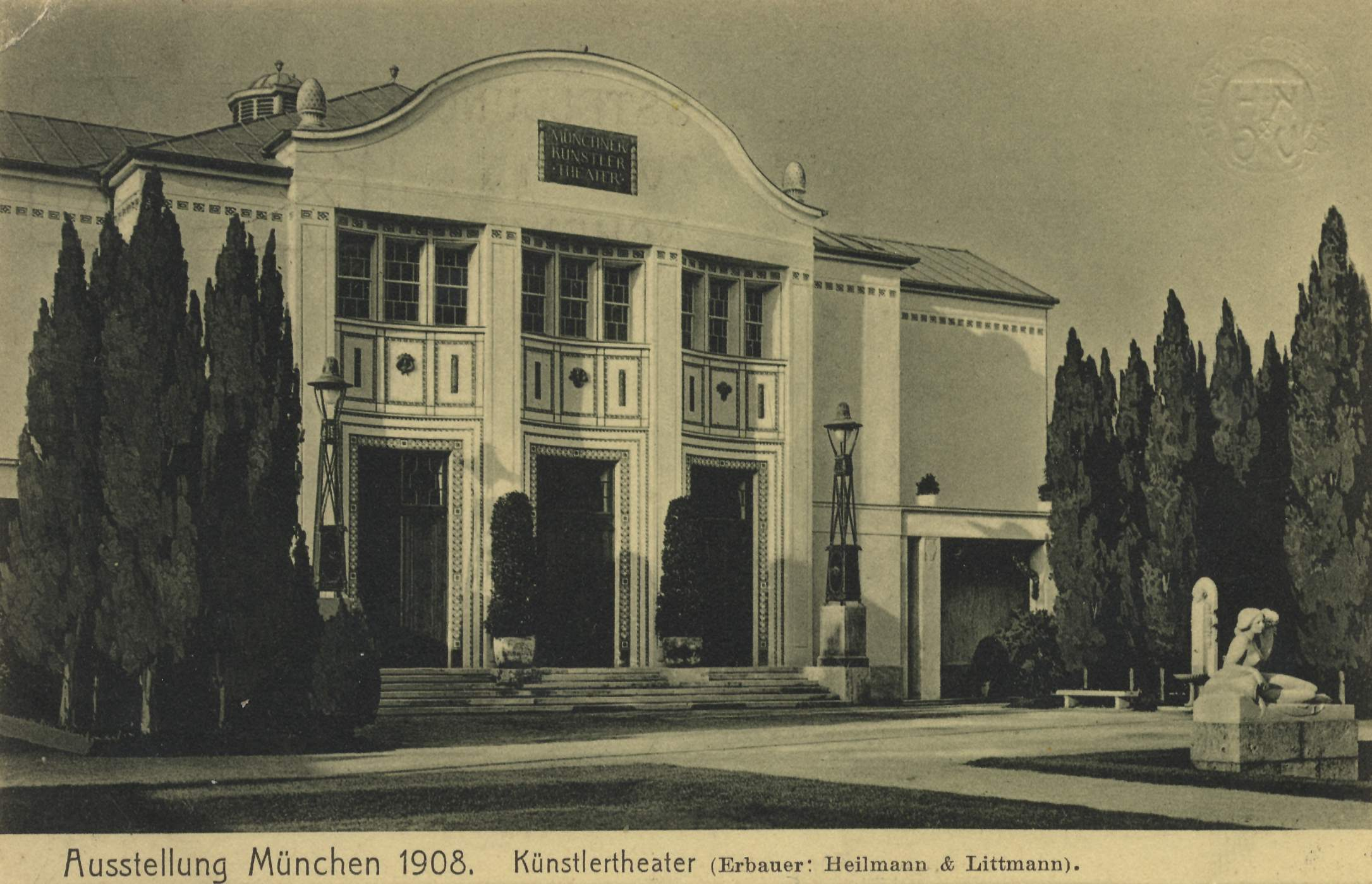
- View of the façade of Munich Art Theatre
- Address: Munich; Germany
- Capacity: 619
- Type: contemporary theatre building

Construction
- Groundbreaking: 1907
- Opened: 1908
- Closed: 1914
- Demolished: 1944 by Second World War bombing
- Architect: Max Littmann

Tenant
- Verein Münchner Künstlertheater / Max Reinhardt

The Munich Art Theatre (Münchner Künstlertheater) was the first German theater constructed in the Art Nouveau style. It was designed by Max Littmann and opened in 1908.

The main initiator was the journalist and dramatist Georg Fuchs, who in 1907 founded a society in Munich, the Verein Münchner Künstlertheater, with the expressed aim of building a theatre according to ‘artistic principles’.

The theatre was built with a shallow stage, apron, and no orchestra pit.

Seats were arranged in an amphitheatre form.

The most innovative feature was the ‘relief stage’ where the performers acted before a stylized backdrop.

Although the first productions coordinated by Fuchs were not particularly successful, the building and the relief stage attracted a good deal of attention.

It was leased to Max Reinhardt in 1909 and closed in 1914.

The building was destroyed during World War II bombing.
