= Helmut Jürgens =

German scenic designer and costume designer

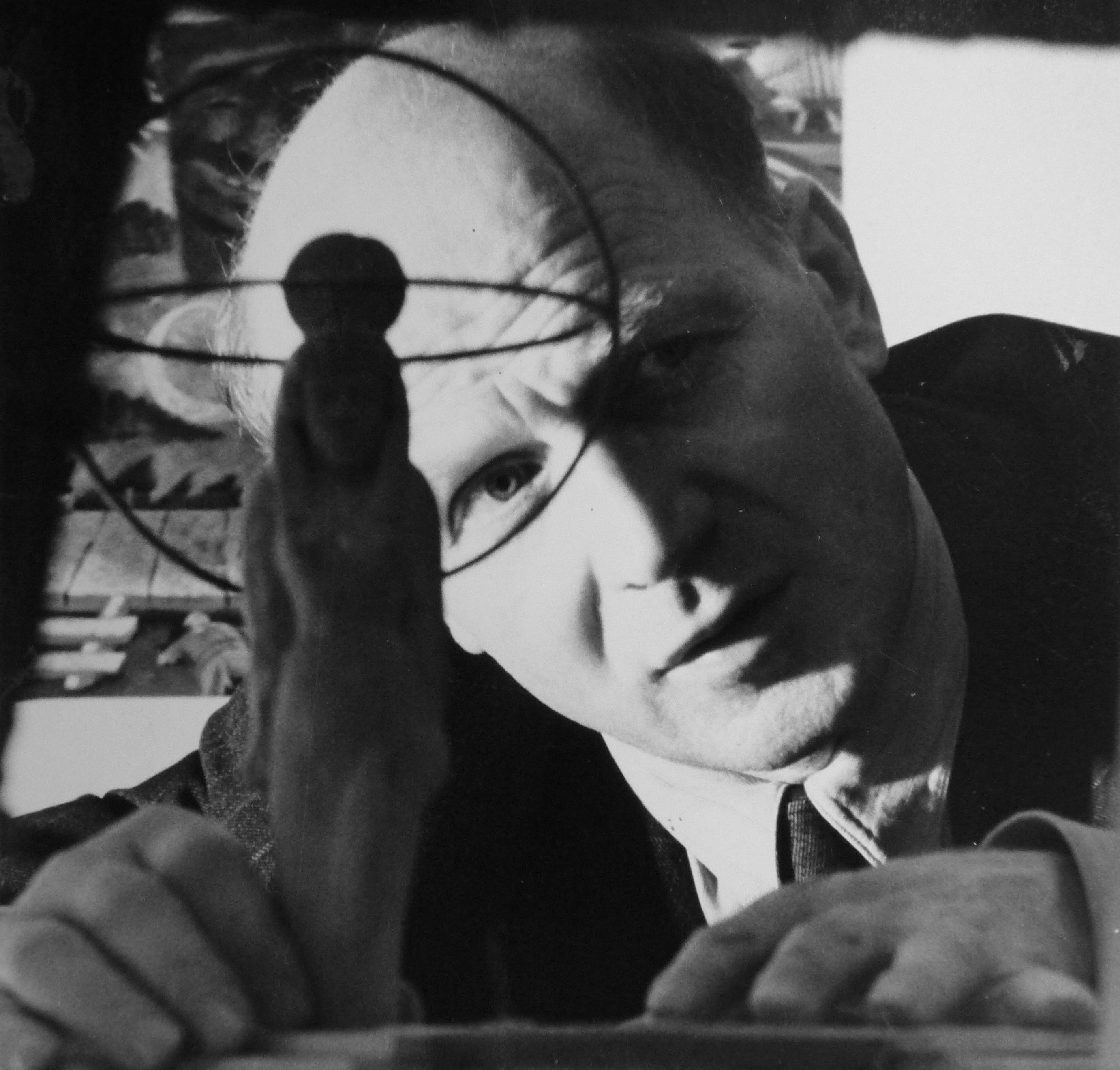
Helmut Jürgens, 1948

Helmut Jürgens (19 June 1902 – 29 August 1963) was a German scenic designer and costume designer.

== Life and work ==
Born in Höxter, Westphalia, Jürgens attended high school there and in Warburg, He undertook an apprenticeship as a church and decorating painter from 1920 to 1923, followed by studying at the Kunstgewerbeschule (School of applied arts) in Kassel from 1923 to 1924 and the Kunstakademie Düsseldorf from 1924 to 1926. His first independent pieces were staged from 1926 to 1930 in Krefeld, Mönchen-Gladbach and Aachen.

From 1930 to 1938, Helmut Jürgens became director of sets of the municipal theaters of Düsseldorf. From 1938 until the end of World War II, he was director of sets of the municipal theaters in Frankfurt am Main, with guest engagements in Barcelona, Budapest, Mülheim an der Ruhr and Prague.

Jürgens died in Munich.
