= Deutsches Theater (Berlin) =

Theater in Germany

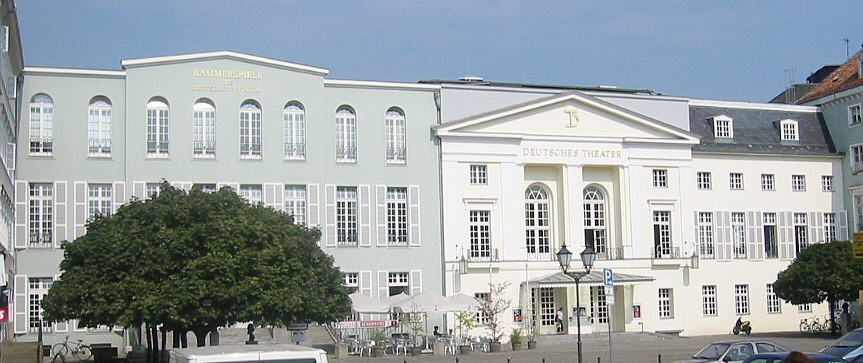
- Theaters in Schumannstraße: Kammerspiele (left) and Deutsches Theater (right)
- Interactive map of Deutsches Theater
- Former names: Friedrich-Wilhelm-Städtisches Theater
- Address: Schumannstraße 13A; Berlin; Germany
- Coordinates: 52°31′28″N 13°22′56″E
- Type: Theater

Construction
- Built: 1850
- Opened: 1883

Website
- deutschestheater.de

The Deutsches Theater is a theater in Berlin, Germany. It was built in 1850 as Friedrich-Wilhelm-Städtisches Theater, after Frederick William IV of Prussia. Located on Schumann Street (Schumannstraße), the Deutsches Theater consists of two adjoining stages that share a common, classical facade. The main stage was built in 1850, originally for operettas.

Adolf L'Arronge founded the Deutsches Theater in 1883 with the ambition of providing Berliners with a high-quality ensemble-based repertory company on the model of the German court theater, the Meiningen Ensemble, which had been developed by Georg II, Duke of Saxe-Meiningen and his colleagues to become "the most widely admired and imitated company in Europe", thanks to its historically accurate sets and costumes, vividly-realized crowd scenes, and meticulous directorial control.

Otto Brahm, the leading exponent of theatrical Naturalism in Germany, took over the direction of the theater in 1894, and applied that approach to a combination of classical productions and stagings of the work of the new realistic playwrights.

One of Brahm's ensemble, the legendary theater director Max Reinhardt, took over the directorship in 1904. Under his leadership, it acquired a reputation as one of the most significant theaters in the world. In 1905, he founded a theater school and built a chamber theater. Reinhardt remained the artistic director of the theater until he fled Nazi Germany in 1933.

The Deutsches Theater remains one of the most prominent companies in Berlin.
