= Louise Kirkby Lunn =

English coloratura contralto (1873 - 1930)

1914 cigarette card

Louise Kirkby Lunn (Note: The second k in Kirkby is silent.) (8 November 1873 – 17 February 1930) was an English contralto (sometimes classified as a dramatic mezzo-soprano). Born into a working-class family in Manchester, She appeared in many French and Italian operas, but was best known as a Wagnerian. In addition to many appearances at the Royal Opera House, Covent Garden, London, she was seen frequently at the Metropolitan Opera, New York in the early years of the 20th century. She died in London, aged 56.

== Life and career ==
=== Early years ===
Kirkby Lunn was born Louisa Baker in Manchester on 8 November 1872, the daughter of William Henry Baker (1839–1893) an iron moulder, and his wife, Mary Elizabeth, née Kirkby (1839–1922), a confectioner. She was trained as a dressmaker, but took singing lessons with the choirmaster of her local church, and in 1890 she obtained a place at the Royal College of Music (RCM) in London and studied for three years with Albert Visetti. She adopted her stage name at that time.The following year, also under the baton of Stanford and the direction of Richard Temple, she played the Marquise de Montcontour in Delibes' Le roi l'a dit at the Prince of Wales's Theatre. During her time at the RCM she also studied for some time with Jacques Bouhy in Paris.

As Ortrud in Lohengrin

As Fricka in Die Walküre

In 1895 Kirkby Lunn appeared in the first season of promenade concerts for Henry Wood, singing songs by J. L. Hatton and Arthur Sullivan. In March 1896 she made her professional operatic début as Nora in Stanford's Shamus O'Brien at the Opera Comique, London, again under Wood, a production that ran for 100 nights.

Augustus Harris, who ran the Royal Opera House, Covent Garden, gave her a five-year contract in 1896, and she made her début there in June as one of the Valkyries in Wagner's Die Walküre (sung in French). The contract lapsed with Harris's sudden death soon after her début, and she joined the Carl Rosa Opera Company, as principal mezzo-soprano in London and on tour. With that company over the next four years her leading roles included Carmen, Siebel in Faust, Azucena in Il trovatore, Ortrud in Lohengrin, Brangäne in Tristan und Isolde, Magdalena in Die Meistersinger and Fricka in Die Walküre(sung in French). She remained with the Carl Rosa company until 1899. In July of that year she married William John Kirkby Pearson (1871–1946), a second cousin, whom she had known since their childhood. Their son, Louis Kirkby Lunn Pearson, was born in 1900.

Kirkby Lunn continued to be active in concerts as well as opera. In the 1900–1901 Queen's Hall season she sang for Wood in concerts ranging from Beethoven's Ninth Symphony to Gilbert and Sullivan excerpts. The following year she sang in a series of Wagner concerts and a performance of Sullivan's cantata The Golden Legend to mark the first anniversary of the composer's death.

=== Opera ===
In the first decade of the 20th century Kirkby Lunn established herself as a leading operatic singer, both in London and in New York. In May 1902, as a last-minute substitute for Olive Fremstad, she played Ortrud in a performance of Lohengrin before a distinguished audience headed by the King and Queen. Within a week she was appearing with another new Covent Garden star, described by The Times as "M. Caruso, a distinguished tenor from Monte Carlo", in Rigoletto and Aida. In the German repertory she played Brangäne to the Isolde of Lillian Nordica. In The Oxford Dictionary of National Biography, Tully Potter writes:

For the next dozen seasons she would sing on equal terms with Caruso, Antonio Scotti, Nellie Melba, Emma Calvé, Emmy Destinn, Maurice Renaud, Pol Plançon, and the like. Kirkby Lunn's first Covent Garden Carmen was in 1906, with Giovanni Zenatello as José and Suzanne Adams as Micaëla. She appeared in Ring cycles conducted by Hans Richter (1906 and 1908) and Arthur Nikisch (1907).

The Times considered her greatest achievement at Covent Garden was in Aida:

Those who were frequenters of Covent Garden throughout that rich period which ended in 1914 remember Kirkby Lunn's Amneris as they remember Melba's Mimi, Caruso's Canio, and Scotti's Scarpia, as something by which the excellence of other presentations of the part may be judged.

At Covent Garden her other roles included Pallas in Saint-Saëns's Hélène, Hérodiade in Massenet's Hérodiade (staged in this production under the title Salome), La Haine in Gluck's Armide, Olga in Tchaikovsky's Eugene Onegin, and Orfeo in Gluck's Orfeo ed Euridice.

From 1902 Kirkby Lunn appeared frequently in the US. She made her début at the Metropolitan Opera in New York as Ortrud in December of that year, and appeared with the company there more than fifty times over the next six years. Kirkby Lunn's only operatic appearances in continental Europe were guest performances in 1906 at the Hungarian Royal Opera House, Budapest, playing Orfeo, Dalila and Carmen. Her last appearances in an international opera season were eight performances in Aida with Destinn at Covent Garden in 1919. In 1919–22 she appeared there with the British National Opera Company; her final performances were as Kundry.

=== Concerts ===
Alongside her operatic appearances Kirkby Lunn maintained a concert and recital career. In March 1904 she was a principal soloist in the Elgar Festival concerts given at Covent Garden, appearing on the first night with John Coates and David Ffrangcon-Davies in The Dream of Gerontius, and on the second with them and with Agnes Nicholls, Kennerley Rumford and Andrew Black in The Apostles. (Note: The part of the Angel in Gerontius became particularly associated with Kirkby Lunn. Two years after the Elgar Festival she performed it with the same colleagues (but for Henry Wood) in Leeds. She sang it under Hans Richter at Birmingham in 1909 with John Coates and Frederic Austin; The Athenaeum remarked, "each, in turn, brought to it an accession of glory". Wood greatly admired her, and engaged her frequently, choosing her for a Sheffield Festival presentation of a suite from Rimsky-Korsakov's opera Christmas Eve, with Francis Hurford, in 1908.) .She made several further appearances for the society between 1913 and 1916. (Note: Kirkby Lunn made two further appearances for the society before the First World War, on the opening nights (November) of the 1913 and 1914 seasons. At the former she sang the scena from Wagner's Rienzi, 'Gerechter Gott!', for Willem Mengelberg, and on the second occasion the Ballade La Fiancée du Timbalier by Saint-Saëns, for Thomas Beecham. She performed the Brahms Alto Rhapsody at Queen's Hall under Henri Verbrugghen in the Festival of April 1915, and she also sang in the Festival of British Music there the following month. In November 1916, she reappeared with the society's orchestra to sing Mozart's "Non più di fiori" from La clemenza di Tito.)

Kirkby Lunn toured Australasia In 1912–13 and she appeared at the major British festivals and London recital venues; Potter singles out the Bechstein Hall (from 1917 the Wigmore Hall), which was under the management of her husband. She gave recitals there from 1902 to 1925. Her last major London appearance was at the Albert Hall in a Royal Choral Society performance of Handel's Messiah in April 1927, conducted by Malcolm Sargent.

=== Death ===
After a five-month illness, Kirkby Lunn died of cancer at her home in St John's Wood, London, on 17 February 1930, aged 56.

== Recordings ==
In 1912 Kirkby Lunn recorded two duets with John McCormack, from operas by Wolf-Ferrari. These duets have been remastered and reissued on CD, as have some of her other, solo, 78-rpm discs. Her main body of her recordings were made for the Gramophone Company between 1909 and 1916 but there were also Pathé records cut earlier, including duets that feature Ben Davies. Among the operatic excerpts in her recorded output is music by Wagner, Verdi, Ponchielli, Gluck and Mozart. The acoustic recording process of the day was not always kind to Kirkby-Lunn's voice although it is better caught in some pieces such as the Gounod "Entreat me not to leave thee", or the Arthur Thomas "A Summer night". '"Che faro?" from Orfeo was committed to disc in about 1915. The partnership with Destinn is preserved on record, in a 1911-recorded "Ebben qual nuovo fremito" from Aida, and a 1911 "L'amo come il fulgor", from Ponchielli's La Gioconda. In 1917 Edward German's Kipling setting "Have you news of my boy Jack?" gave Kirkby Lunn "a wartime hit on disc".

A large number of records reflect that her voice is superb quality from top to bottom, but it is often lack of real drama or engagement with the characters.

== Notes, references and sources ==
=== Sources ===
- Davidson, Gladys (1955). Opera Biographies. London: Werner Laurie. OCLC 468886467.
- Kennedy, Michael (1974). Mahler. London: Dent. OCLC 681899852.
- Klein, Herman (1903). Thirty Years of Musical Life in London, 1870–1900. New York: Century. OCLC 251451598.
- Lee-Browne, Martin (1999). Nothing so Charming as Musick!. London: Thames. OCLC 43340543.
- Scott, Michael (1977). The Record of Singing. London: Duckworth. ISBN 978-0-71-561030-5.
- Wood, Henry J. (1946). My Life of Music. London: Victor Gollancz. OCLC 656077498.
- Young, Percy M (1955). Letters of Edward Elgar. London: Geoffrey Bles. OCLC 1280981.
