= Frederic Austin =

English composer and baritone (1872–1952)

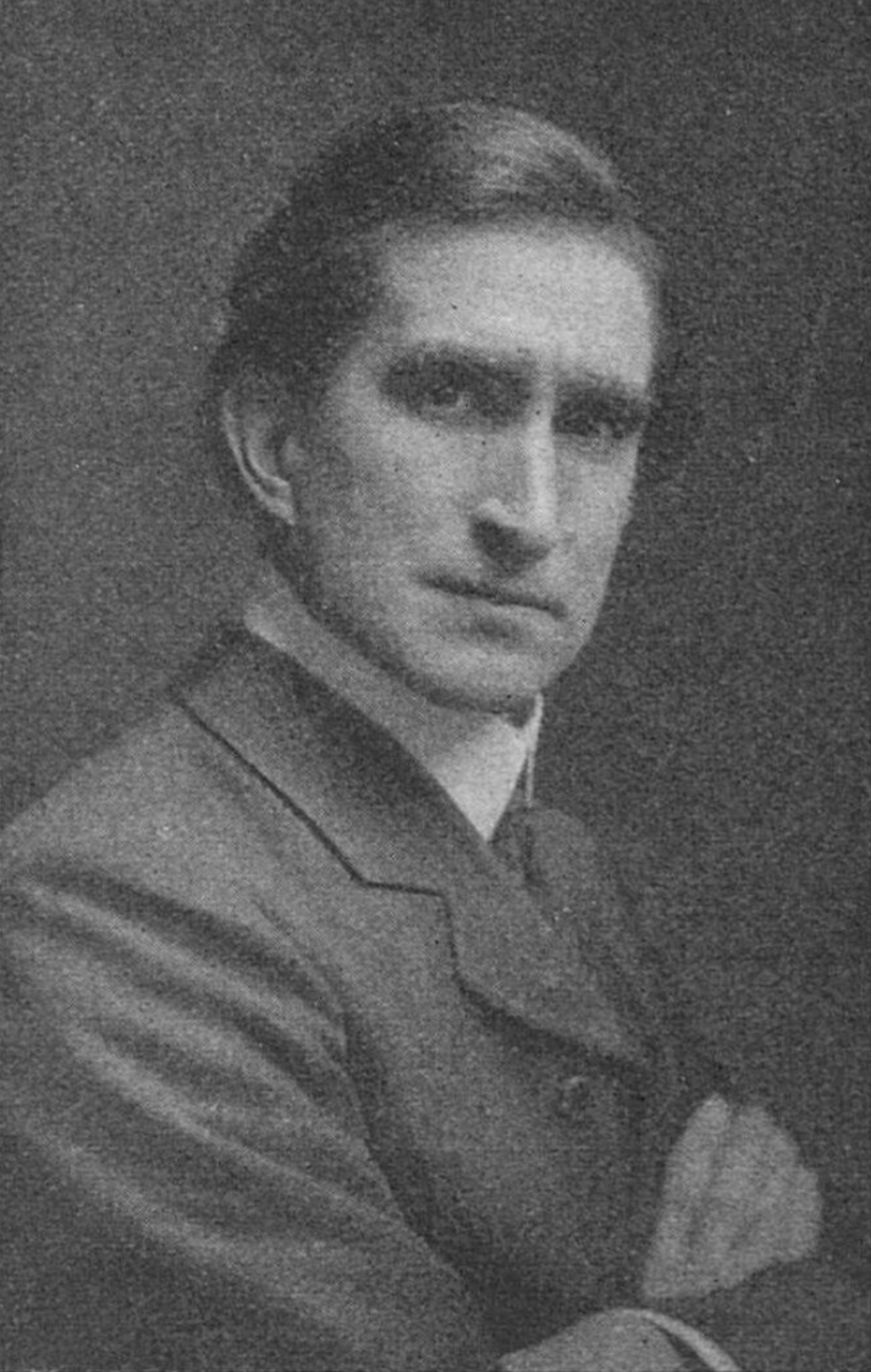
Austin in 1907

Frederic William Austin (30 March 1872 – 10 April 1952) was an English baritone singer, a musical teacher and composer in the period 1905–30. He is perhaps best remembered for his arrangement of Johann Pepusch's music for a 1920 production of The Beggar's Opera by John Gay, and its sequel Polly in 1922; and for his popularization of the melody of the carol The Twelve Days of Christmas. Austin was the older brother of the composer Ernest Austin (1874–1947).

== Training and early career ==
Frederick William Austin was born in Poplar, Middlesex on 30 March 1872, the son of William and Elizabeth Austin; his father was a shirt tailor. Austin was sent at the age of about 12 to live at Birkenhead, where he received organ and music lessons from his uncle, W. H. Hunt, and had singing training from Charles Lunn. By 1896 he had obtained a B.Mus. from Durham University and was organist in several Birkenhead churches. He became a teacher of harmony, and later of composition, at Liverpool College of Music.

At Liverpool he became close friends with the composer Cyril Scott, and through him was introduced to H. Balfour Gardiner, who became a lifelong friend. Through them he was received into the circle of young English composers known as the Frankfurt Group, and their friends. These included Scott, Gardiner, Norman O'Neill, Roger Quilter, Percy Grainger (owing to their training at the Hoch Conservatory) in Frankfurt and such friends as Ernest Bryson, Benjamin Dale, Gervase Elwes, Eugène Goossens, fils and Arnold Bax.

This group, in which Frederick Delius sometimes appeared, often performed each other's music in informal surroundings, and Austin in particular used to improvise at the piano with Arnold Bax. In August 1900 he completed his first orchestral work, the concert Overture Richard II, which received its first performance on 12 December 1901 by the Bournemouth Municipal Orchestra under Dan Godfrey. In 1902, the year of his marriage to Amy Oliver, Austin gave lessons in composition to Thomas Beecham, sang Tchaikovsky's "Pilgrim's Song" for a Henry Wood promenade concert, and was introduced to Hans Richter, for whom he later sang in Beethoven's Choral Symphony and Missa solemnis, and Bach's St Matthew Passion.

In 1904 he moved to Pinner, sang under Felix Weingartner and at Wagner nights at the Prom Concerts, and took the name role in Mendelssohn's Elijah at Gloucester in the Three Choirs Festival. In June 1905 he took part in Beecham's London debut at the Bechstein Hall, in the first London performance of Scott's Ballad of Fair Helen of Kilconnell (dedicated to him).

== Recitals in London and the provinces ==
At the 1905 Sheffield Festival Frederic Austin gave the final scena from Eugene Onegin, with Olga Wood (repeated 1911). At Hereford he appeared in Franck's Les Béatitudes, and introduced songs by Thomas Dunhill. His Queen's Hall performances included the Four Serious Songs of Brahms. His first major London recital (Aeolian Hall) with Hamilton Harty (piano) was on 3 April 1906, and he sang for the Philharmonic Society. For Weingartner he gave the Die Walküre finale with Agnes Nicholls, and at Queen's Hall the premiere of Balfour Gardiner's When the lad for longing sighs.

In 1906 at Southport he took baritone roles in The Dream of Gerontius (beside John Coates) under the baton of the composer, Sir Edward Elgar. In April 1907 he was at Reading, Berkshire, in Parry's De Profundis and Stanford's Elegiac Ode: at Hanley he gave the premiere of Havergal Brian's By the Waters of Babylon. In October, after Gerontius at Preston, he sang for Elgar in The Apostles at Birmingham. Henry Wood introduced Austin's symphonic composition Rhapsody: Spring, and engaged him to sing in two concerts, including that in which Delius's Piano Concerto in C minor was first given. Austin met Delius that year, and also made a Covent Garden debut, a small role in Tannhäuser, for Richter.

== New work in opera and oratorio ==
1908 saw much oratorio, with Handel's Messiah (Wood, Queen's Hall), Gerontius (with Coates, Manchester, under Richter), Elgar's King Olaf (Norwich Festival), Judas in The Apostles (Liverpool), Bach's Phoebus and Pan (Queen's Hall), and Coleridge-Taylor's Hiawatha's Wedding Feast. His first Covent Garden lead appearance was Gunther (Götterdämmerung) in Richter's English Ring cycle, repeated three times in February 1909. Late in 1908 he and Cyril Scott gave a recital of Scott's songs at the Bechstein Hall.

At the Sheffield Festival of 1908 he was exceptionally busy, with performances of Samson and Delilah, Schumann's Paradise and the Peri, Sir Walford Davies' Everyman, Beethoven's Choral Symphony, and Debussy's L'Enfant Prodigue, specially re-scored by the composer, and delivered under Henry Wood with Austin, Agnes Nicholls, and the tenor Felix Senius. At this Festival also on 6 October he gave the English premiere (following the Essen, 1906, first) of Delius's Sea Drift. Wood chose Austin as the only man "who could be trusted to sing it con amore". He sang it again in December, and in February 1909, for Beecham: Birmingham first heard it in 1912.

Austin premiered Granville Bantock's Omar Khayyam Part III (Birmingham 1909), and in that year sang The Apostles (Judas) and Parry's Job at Hereford. At Liverpool in September 1909 was the first Festival of The Musical League, created by English composers for performance of their music; Austin's symphonic poem Isabella appeared, and he sang in Ethel Smyth's The Dance and Anacreontic Ode, Havergal Brian's By the Waters of Babylon, and Vaughan Williams’ cantata Willow-wood.

== Operatic work and expanding repertoire ==
In 1910 Austin commenced his regular operatic career, appearing as Wotan and Wanderer, and doubling as Gunther, in the Edinburgh Denhof Opera Company Ring cycle under Michael Balling. He also appeared in two Ring cycles at Covent Garden. At Hereford he performed the traditional Festival-opening Elijah (and again in 1911), and gave the premiere of Bantock's Gethsemane, and in London repeated the Omar Khayyam. For the Philharmonic Society he gave songs by Ethel Smyth under her direction. In 1911 he was also singing concert performances of The Damnation of Faust (Berlioz) and Faust (Gounod), Dvořák choral works, Handel oratorios, Beethoven Missa solemnis, the Mozart Requiem, Brahms A German Requiem, Max Bruch's Frithjof and Lay of the Bell, Mendelssohn's St Paul and Die erste Walpurgisnacht, and many other works.

In 1912 Beecham took the Denhof Ring cycle to Glasgow, Hull, Leeds, Liverpool and Manchester, and in these years Austin also appeared with them in the first English Elektra (Richard Strauss), as Kunrad in Feuersnot, Dr Coppelius in The Tales of Hoffmann, Gratiano in Così fan tutte, Tomasso in Tiefland (Eugen d'Albert), Escamillo in Carmen and as Vanderdecken in The Flying Dutchman. In 1913 the Denhof Company was wound up and reformed as the Beecham Company, and until around 1920 Austin appeared for Beecham also as Wolfram (Tannhäuser), Iago (Otello), Ford (Falstaff), Hans Sachs (Die Meistersinger von Nürnberg), and in Madama Butterfly, La bohème, Pagliacci, Joseph Holbrooke's Dylan, and other works.

== English recital and drama ==
In the spring of 1912 was the first series of the Balfour Gardiner Queen's Hall Concerts, devoted to contemporary English music, which effectually transformed the acceptance and establishment of the English composers. In the fourth concert Austin sang Scott's Helen of Kirconnell again, and gave the premiere of Norman O'Neill's La belle dame sans merci. Austin's own symphonic Rhapsody: Spring was also repeated, and in March 1913 his Symphony in E was first performed. In 1912 Austin delivered his own Three Songs of Unrest, and gave a serious lecture on the songs of Hugo Wolf. Before the First World War he was also singing in Germany, the Netherlands and Denmark. In 1914 at The Music Club in London he performed several songs of Arnold Schoenberg in the composer's presence. Roger Quilter dedicated his song The Jocund Dance (Op. 18, No. 3) to him, written 1913–14.

From 1913 Austin developed close connections with Rutland Boughton, and assisted in the development of the English music drama at Glastonbury. In the Summer Festivals of August 1914 and 1915 he sang the role of Eochaidh the King in The Immortal Hour there, and again at Bournemouth in 1915, with Frank Mullings and Percy Heming, and in 1916 was King Arthur in The Round Table. 1916 also saw the first performance of his most lasting orchestral composition, Danish Sketches, Palsgaard, conducted by Thomas Beecham on 11 December for the Royal Philharmonic Society.

== Operatic farewell ==
Austin in 1922

Austin's last formal operatic performance was as Count Almaviva in The Marriage of Figaro for Beecham, at Covent Garden in 1920. Neville Cardus, who saw him in the role beside Agnes Nicholls and Frederick Ranalow, wrote: "Nobody else has passed across the closing scene of the opera with half of Austin's grace of bearing and suggestion of courtly cynicism".

== The Beggar's Opera ==
The restoration of the musical score for The Beggar's Opera by John Gay and Dr. Pepusch (originally produced in 1728) was undertaken by Frederic Austin and completed in 1920 in time for the production by Nigel Playfair, with artistic designs by Claud Lovat Fraser, which opened at the Lyric Theatre, Hammersmith on 6 June 1920 and ran for a record number of 1,463 performances until 23 December 1923. Austin preferred the simpler versions made by Pepusch to the edition prepared by Thomas Arne. He appeared as Peachum, with Elsie French, Frederick Ranalow (Macheath), Sylvia Nelis (Polly) and others, conducted by Eugène Goossens. The entire venture received universal acclaim, and was performed in Paris, Canada, America and Australia. In 1922 Austin revived the sequel, Polly. Recordings were made of the original cast production.

== Radio and recordings ==
Austin composed music for a made-for-radio short drama, The Blacksmith's Serenade (based on a poem by Vachel Lindsay), which was aired by the British Broadcasting Company on 15 January 1924.

He made recordings for both the Gramophone Company and the Columbia Graphophone Company.

== Compositions and directing ==
Austin was responsible for popularizing the now-standard melody for the Christmas Carol "The Twelve Days of Christmas". He later wrote that "[t]his song was, in my childhood, current in my family. I have not met with the tune of it elsewhere, nor with the particular version of the words, and have, in this setting, recorded both to the best of my recollection." Austin's arrangement for solo voice and piano, which he performed in recitals from 1905 onwards, was published by Novello & Co. in 1909.

In 1922 he became artistic director of the British National Opera Company, reformed out of Beecham's company, and in 1923 was elected a member of the Royal Philharmonic Society. In this way, and through his teaching, he continued to train and encourage English singers for many years more. He continued to compose theatre incidental music, notably for The Knight of the Burning Pestle (1923), The Insect Play (1923), Congreve's The Way of the World (1924), John Drinkwater's Robert Burns (1925), Vallombrossa (1926), and Prudence (1931). He wrote a cello sonata in 1927. In 1932 he made a last singing appearance in Alfred Reynolds’ Derby Day. He composed the music for the Ealing Studios film Undercover (1943), aka Underground Guerrillas (USA), The Insect Play (1939) (TV), The Knight of the Burning Pestle (1938) (TV), and for the movie Midshipman Easy (1935), aka Men of the Sea (USA: reissue title).

== Family life ==
Frederic Austin: Organ Sonata in one movement (c.1935–1939). MIDI rendition using 'Jeux' soundfont.

Austin had a son and a daughter, Freda, with his wife Amy. His son Richard (1903–89) was the chief conductor of the Bournemouth Municipal Orchestra (now the Bournemouth Symphony Orchestra) from 1934 until 1939, and became Head of the Opera Department of the Royal College of Music in 1953. It was probably during Richard Austin's time in Bournemouth that Frederic Austin wrote his one-movement Organ Sonata, dedicated to the composer and railway enthusiast Percy Whitlock, organist at the Pavilion Theatre from 1935.

Frederic Austin died in a hospital in the Kensington area of London on 10 April 1952 aged 80.

== Sources ==
- N. Cardus, Autobiography (London: Collins, 1947).
- G. Davidson, Opera Biographies (London: Werner Laurie, 1955).
- R. Elkin, Royal Philharmonic (Rider & Co, 1946).
- V. Langfield, Roger Quilter, His Life and Music (Boydell, 2002) ISBN 9780851158716
- M. Lee-Browne, Nothing so charming as Musick: The Life and Times of Frederic Austin (London: Thames 1999) ISBN 9780905210971
- H. Wood, My Life of Music (London: Gollancz 1938)
