= Frederick Ranalow =

Irish opera singer and actor (1873–1953)

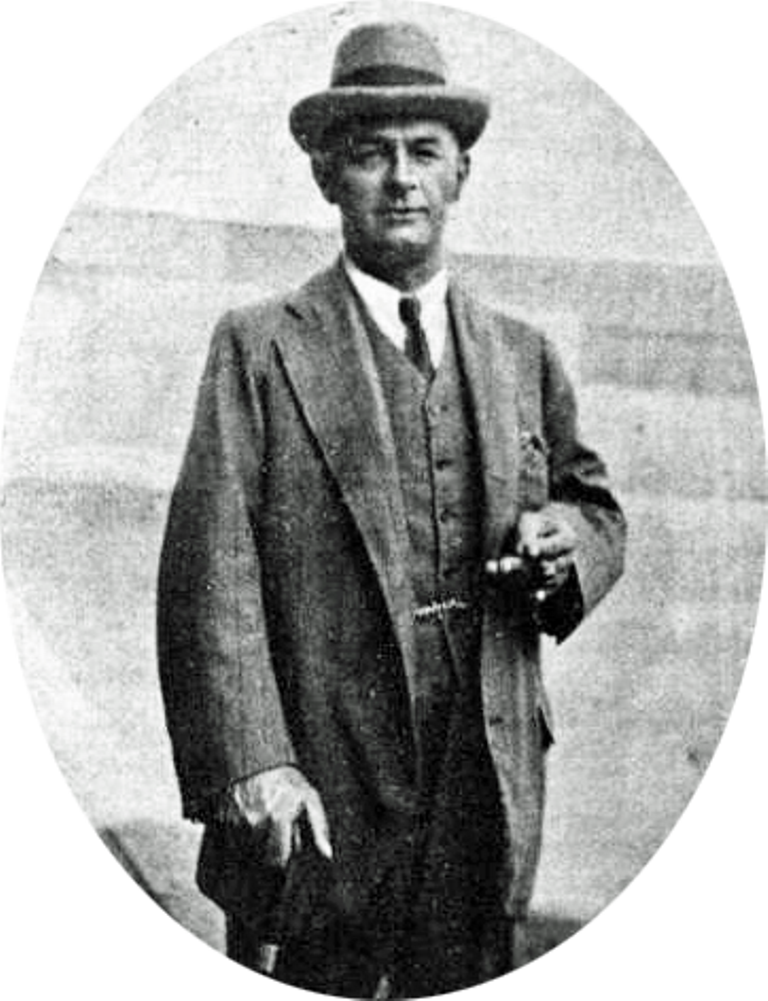
Ranalow in 1922

A magnet hung in a hardware shop
"A magnet hung in a hardware shop" from Patience, recorded 1921, with Ranalow singing the role of the Archibald Grosvenor

Frederick Baring Ranalow (7 November 1873 – 8 December 1953) was an Irish baritone who was distinguished in opera, oratorio, and musical theatre, but whose name is now principally associated with the role of Captain Macheath in the ballad opera The Beggar's Opera, which he sang close to 1,500 times. He was also a minor film actor and writer of songs.

== Early life ==
Ranalow was born in Kingstown, County Dublin. He was taken to England when quite young, and by age 10 he was a chorister at St Paul's Cathedral in London; he later went to Westminster School and studied under Arthur Oswald and Alberto Randegger at the Royal Academy of Music.

== Singing career ==
As early as 1895, he was singing in oratorios and cantatas at the Queen's Hall, the Royal Albert Hall and at the principal provincial festivals. Between 1904 and 1929, he sang at the Proms on 21 occasions, in songs and operatic excerpts. He toured Australia and New Zealand in 1909 with Dame Nellie Melba.

Ranalow sang with the Beecham Opera Company in such roles as Figaro, Papageno, Hans Sachs, Falstaff and Prince Igor, being particularly renowned for his Figaro during the First World War. (In 1919 Peter Warlock wrote to Frederick Delius of his admiration for Ranalow's Falstaff in a performance under Eugène Goossens, fils.) Ranalow also appeared in The Tales of Hoffmann, Die Fledermaus, La bohème, Tristan und Isolde, Tannhäuser, The Secret of Susanna, Louise, and Götterdämmerung.

In 1914, he sang in the Requiem by Giuseppe Verdi, with Agnes Nicholls and others. On 28 January 1916 he created the role of Ned Travers in Ethel Smyth's opera The Boatswain's Mate.

In 1920, he took on the role of Captain Macheath in The Beggar's Opera at the Lyric Theatre, Hammersmith. He went on to sing the role 1,463 times, and his name is particularly associated with this role. He also sang in the sequel, Polly.

On 5 March 1921, at the Royal Albert Hall, he was the baritone soloist with the Royal Choral Society in the first performance of Stanford's At the Abbey Gate, Op. 177, in what proved to be the composer's final public appearance as a conductor. In 1921, he sang in Elgar's The Dream of Gerontius with the Royal Choral Society at the Royal Albert Hall in a memorial tribute to the late Gervase Elwes, who had been killed in an accident in the United States. In 1922, his singing of the baritone solo in Ralph Vaughan Williams's A Sea Symphony at the Oxford Festival was hailed as the highlight of the festival.

His last appearance at the Proms was on 21 August 1929, when excerpts from The Beggar's Opera were sung for the first time at the Proms.

He later appeared on stage in theatrical roles and light operas, such as Beloved Vagabond, The Toymaker of Nuremberg, Colour Blind, Just a Kiss, Mother of Pearl, By Appointment, and the title role of Samuel Pepys in Mr Pepys (1926). In 1932, John Gielgud suggested his name to C. B. Cochran for the part of Autolycus in Shakespeare's The Winter's Tale.

== Film work ==
Frederick Ranalow appeared in some films, such as:

- The King's Highway (1927; as Macheath)
- The Lost Chord (1933)
- Autumn Crocus (1934; he had appeared in the London stage production in 1931, produced by J. C. Williamson, and also starring Jack Hawkins, Jessica Tandy and Martita Hunt)
- Who's Your Lady Friend? (1937)
- The Knight of the Burning Pestle (TV, 1938) and
- Uncle Silas (1947).

== Composition ==
Ranalow was also the composer of some songs. Roger Quilter's setting of the folk song "Barbara Allen" was originally dedicated to Ranalow, but was rededicated to Quilter's nephew Arnold Guy Vivian when the setting was included in the Arnold Book of Old Songs on its publication in 1950.

== Personal life and recognition ==
He was named a Fellow of the RAM in honour of his distinguished musical career.

Frederick Ranalow died in London in 1953, aged 80.

== Recordings ==
Ranalow made a number of recordings. They include:

- 1920 acoustic recording of The Beggar's Opera under Frederic Austin; three excerpts ("My heart was free"; "How happy I could be with either"; "If the heart of a man") are included in the His Master's Voice disc "Great British Basses and Baritones"
- Archibald Grosvenor in the 1921 recording of Patience (he replaced Robert Radford, whose performance was objected to by Rupert D'Oyly Carte.
- Sir Joseph Porter in the 1922 recording of H.M.S. Pinafore
- Sharpless in the first English-language recording of Madama Butterfly, with Rosina Buckman in the title role
- excerpts from Dame Ethel Smyth's opera The Boatswain's Mate, with Rosina Buckman and Courtice Pounds; all three singers had appeared in the premiere performance
- various songs including "The Floral Dance".

== Personal life ==
Ranalow married Lillian Mary Oates, the sister of Captain Lawrence Oates, and they had a son and a daughter. Their son Patrick Baring Oates Ranalow, born 21 August 1914, was a Flight Lieutenant in the Royal Air Force Volunteer Reserve. He died on active service on 8 April 1945 and is buried in the Becklingen War Cemetery, Germany.
