= John Coates (tenor) =

English tenor (1865–1941)

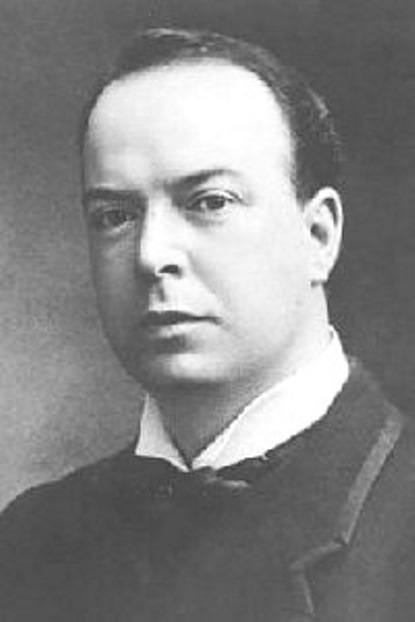
John Coates

John Coates (29 June 1865 – 16 August 1941) was a leading English tenor, who sang in opera and oratorio and on the concert platform. His repertoire ranged from Bach and Purcell to contemporary works, and embraced the major heldentenor roles in Richard Wagner's operas. For more than 40 years, with only a four-year interruption for military service during World War I, he overcame the limitations of a voice that was not naturally large by impressing listeners with his intense artistic expression, lively diction, musical versatility and memorable stage presence.

Coates spent some time on the European continent, toured Australia and South Africa in 1912–13 and performed in North America in the 1890s and again in 1925. He performed most often, however, in his native country and became a beloved figure at England's regional music festivals. Elgar's Dream of Gerontius was one of his specialties. After 1921, he limited his performances to the concert stage and recitals, still performing a wide-ranging repertoire, but championing English composers. A dispute with music publishers about royalties clouded his later years.

== Training and career as baritone ==
Coates was born in Girlington, Bradford on 29 June 1865. He came from a musical family on both sides, and for many generations. He attended Bradford Grammar School, where Frederick Delius was his (slightly younger) contemporary. His early singing experience came as a chorister in a church choir (under his father's direction), where he learnt the importance of accent in singing from the performance of the Gregorian chant. He studied voice under multiple teachers: in Yorkshire under J. G. Walton, Robert Burton and J. C. Bridge, in London under W. Shakespeare and T. A. Wallworth, and in Paris under Jacques Bouhy.

Coates began his performing career as a baritone. He first appeared as Valentin in Gounod's Faust, as an amateur, with the Carl Rosa Opera Company in Manchester and Liverpool. After further training, he was engaged by the D'Oyly Carte Opera Company for its 1894 tour, at first playing the baritone role of Mr. Goldbury in Utopia Limited in the original American production. He then created the role of Baron van den Berg in Mirette with D'Oyly Carte at the Savoy Theatre, followed by more touring, and left the company in 1895. Coates then sang in Edwardian musical comedies in London and on tour in the United States. He also introduced Arthur Sullivan's song, "The Absent-Minded Beggar" at the Alhambra Theatre in 1899.

== 1900–1916 in opera and touring ==
In the later 1890s, Coates left the stage for a medical operation on his vocal cords and further study, and reappeared as a tenor in light opera in 1899–1900 at the Globe Theatre in London. He first appeared at the Globe Theatre in The Gay Pretenders in November 1900 and then at Covent Garden Opera House to create the role of Claudio in Charles Villiers Stanford's four-act opera Much Ado About Nothing in 1901. The press did not much appreciate the production. This was followed by Gounod's Faust, this time in the title role. That year he also appeared in the "Gürzenich's Concerts and Opera" at Cologne and at Leipzig.

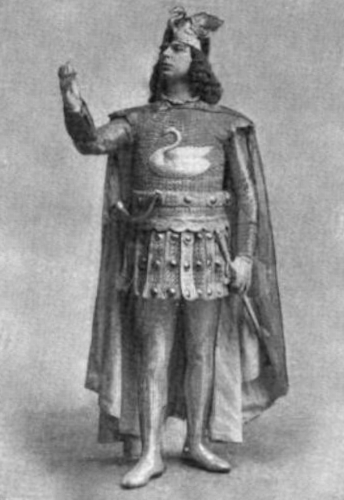
As Lohengrin in 1902

Coates became one of the most popular festival singers in England, singing at the triennial Leeds Festival in 1901 and performing Elgar's oratorio Dream of Gerontius at Worcester in 1902, followed by numerous other Elgar works. In 1902, he was heard at the Berlin and Hanover royal opera houses and, in 1906, at key venues in Dresden, Hamburg, Frankfurt, Mannheim and Paris, plus the Cincinnati May Festival. He sang for the English seasons of the Moody-Manners Company at Covent Garden in 1907 and 1908. Coates took part in the May 1908 premiere (concert) performance of Ethel Smyth's The Wreckers, with Blanche Marchesi, under the baton of Artur Nikisch at the Queen's Hall, and in the Thomas Beecham production of the same work at His Majesty's a year later. He appeared with the Carl Rosa company in 1909. Coates was a successful London Don Jose in Bizet's Carmen. He was with the Beecham Company for the spring, summer and winter seasons of 1910, in which the brilliant production of Offenbach's The Tales of Hoffmann owed its success mainly to him, and he also appeared in an exceptionally romantic interpretation of Pedro in Eugen d'Albert's Tiefland. In 1911–13, he toured with the Quinlan Opera Company in provincial England, Australia and South Africa.

Despite his lack of raw vocal power, Coates was still considered to be among the finest of English Wagnerian tenors, especially as Siegfried and Tristan, owing to the strength of his musicianship, his evident intelligence and his impressive deportment on stage. Before the First World War, he also appeared in London as Lohengrin, Tannhäuser as well as Tristan. He sang often in Wagner concerts and appeared as Parsifal in concert performances of the opera. He sang Lohengrin at Cologne, too, and in 1911, performed the Siegfrieds of both Siegfried and Götterdämmerung for the Denhof Opera Company under Sir Thomas Beecham, appearing opposite the Wotan of Frederic Austin.

== 1901–1916 in festival and oratorio ==
The year 1901 saw John Coates' first English festival engagement, at Leeds, and he was thereafter in all the chief English festivals, notably at Worcester, Brighton and Norwich, and at The Crystal Palace. In November 1900 he appeared for Henry J. Wood in the Arthur Sullivan Memorial Concert at Queen's Hall in The Golden Legend, alongside Lillian Blauvelt, Louise Kirkby Lunn and David Ffrangcon-Davies.

He was above all admired in The Dream of Gerontius, in which work he and fellow English-born tenor Gervase Elwes held foremost place in public esteem. In the 1902 Sheffield Festival he sang Gerontius under Elgar's baton with Marie Brema and Ffrangcon-Davies, and with the same soloists under Henry J. Wood at the Queen's Hall, with the London Choral Society, in February 1904. He was chosen to appear at the Festival of Elgar's music under Hans Richter at the Royal Opera House, Covent Garden, performing Gerontius on 14 March 1904 with Kirkby Lunn and Ffrangcon-Davies, and then with Agnes Nicholls, Kennerley Rumford and Andrew Black in The Apostles, on 15 March of that same year.

Elgar, writing to Frank Schuster in 1905, wanted to hear Coates perform the 'Three Holy Kings' scene from Wolfrum's Weihnachtsmysterium. Gerontius was performed with the 1904 line-up under Henry Wood's direction in his 1906 season. Then Frederic Austin was Priest and Angel of the Agony to Coates's Soul at the Festivals of Southport (1906) and Birmingham (1909) and at Manchester (1908). In 1907, in correspondence, Elgar wrote of him: "The Arch-chanter John was the greatest success and a joy to see."

Classical-singing commentator Michael Scott (who, incidentally, calls Coates 'one of the finest English singers on record') notes in The Record of Singing that his repertoire was exceptionally wide-ranging and included Handel's Messiah and Belshazzar, Mendelssohn's St Paul and Elijah, Bach's St Matthew Passion, Elgar's King Olaf and Saint-Saëns's The Promised Land. John Coates and Gervase Elwes were great friends, and Coates stood in for an indisposed Elwes on (at least) one occasion at Gloucester. On another occasion, at Worcester in 1911, Elwes (a Roman Catholic) was booked to sing Gerontius, but upon being told that the name of Mary Mother of God must be excluded from the text (to sing, 'Jesu, pray for me' instead of 'Mary' etc., and with other absurd substitutions and cuts) on the insistence of the Dean and Chapter, he refused to perform, and Coates was called in to replace him. Coates performed the Bach Mass in B minor in the April Festival of 1915 at Queen's Hall, under Henri Verbrugghen.

== War service and later career ==
Coates then saw four years' war service in France as a captain in the Yorkshire Regiment (from 1916 to 1919). In March 1919, he signaled his return to music by giving the first of a long series of English-song recitals, with Anthony Bernard at the piano, at the Queen's Hall. His programs, his enjoyment of the work, his diction and characterization were intensely admired in them.

In 1921, he appeared again in opera as Don José in Carmen and as Lohengrin for Carl Rosa at Covent Garden, but thereafter devoted most of his efforts to concert performance. In 1921 he sang Gerontius at the memorial meeting for Gervase Elwes at the Royal Albert Hall with the Royal Choral Society. (He sang wonderfully, according to the Sunday Times, a courageous thing to do since in his own words he found the sudden death of Elwes in a train accident 'too shocking, too staggering to contemplate. It has affected me to the very depths of my nature ... it brought me to my knees.') From 1920 he began to specialise in song-recitals, of which he gave several each year, favouring all-English performances and championing English composers, but drawing from the repertoire of German and French songs also. In 1922 Roger Quilter, who had written much for Elwes and worked closely with him, dedicated his 'Morning song' (Thomas Heywood) to Coates, one of his most vibrant and characteristic miniatures, though Coates did not give the first performance of it.

As the 1920s unfurled, Coates faced competition at home from an emerging generation of British tenors led by Walter Widdop and Heddle Nash. He toured overseas energetically and in 1925 he made his only extended tour of North America, including Canada as well as the United States on his itinerary. For this trip his usual partner on the piano, Berkeley Mason, was not available. Instead, he found Gerald Moore, then a young accompanist at the beginning of his career. Moore had often heard Coates' recitals at Chelsea Town Hall, but it was through the Australian baritone Peter Dawson (with whom Moore had toured) that the contact came. Once the contact was made, Moore became Coates' sole accompanist for four or five years. Moore devotes a chapter of his memoirs to Coates. He found the tenor a hard taskmaster, but one who transformed him from a mediocre accompanist to an artist with a full realisation of the duties and possibilities of the accompanist's role, aware of the necessity of being a full participant in every living nuance and accent of the music at hand. Moore considered that Coates had laid the groundwork of whatever was truly excellent in his work. Indeed, Coates had told him that the American tour would 'kill or cure' him, and considered the result a 'cure'. The Coates-Moore partnership eventually dissolved over a rehearsal-fees' disagreement, though any cracks in the friendship were repaired by 1929.

Like his renowned British tenor predecessors Sims Reeves and Edward Lloyd, Coates had a famously protective wife. Moore refers to Coates' home life as serene, with an adorable spouse, sons and daughters; but he thought, despite Coates's good humour, he was not a happy person because he was too much of a worrier. Coates developed financial headaches, too. He wasted a good deal of money in a legal case that he launched against the Performing Right Society, in which he argued that he should not have to pay a royalty to perform music in public which had been brought to him in manuscript, and which therefore, by agreeing to sing it, Coates had encouraged the publishers to publish. He lost the case, and it preyed on his mind and finances for long after, though he refused offers of financial support from other singers. In his last years he thought of going back on the stage and started to slim, but he was seized with anaemia and became permanently confined to bed, frustrated at being unable to assist his country as the Second World War took hold. In July 1940, Gerald Moore presented a half-hour broadcast in tribute to their work together, and received a last letter from him in friendship and gratitude.

Coates died in Northwood, London on 16 August 1941, aged 76.

== Reputation ==
Conductor Sir Thomas Beecham remarked of him: 'Coates was among the half-dozen most interesting artistic personalities of the time in England – scrupulous, fastidious and conscientious in all that he attempted. His appearance on the stage was noble and animated, and his voice, although of moderate power, was flexible and expressive. His diction was admirable and his singing of English an unalloyed pleasure to the ear.' In 1924 Eaglefield Hull wrote: 'He unites to a fine tenor voice, wide culture, perfection of vocal declamation and high dramatic attainments.'

Of his concert repertoire Gerald Moore wrote:

Was there ever a singer with a wider repertoire ...? He was equally at home in the lieder of Beethoven, Schubert and Schumann as he was with the early English songs of Arne, Byrd and Purcell; he championed the songs of Bax, Ireland, Howells, Warlock, and was abreast of the younger school; the chansons of Weckerlin, Bruneau, Lully, tripped as easily off his tongue as did Fauré and Duparc. In Germany they called him the ideal Siegfried and Lohengrin. He had played many roles at the Royal Opera House, Covent Garden, under Sir Thomas Beecham, and it is a moot point whether he or Gervase Elwes was the finest Gerontius of that era.

== Recordings ==
John Coates recorded first for the British Gramophone Company, beginning in 1907. Afterwards, he made discs for Columbia Records (including by the electrical recording process). His acoustic recordings of 1907-1915 included:

Gramophone Company: English and Italian Catalogues:

- 3-2910 Take a pair of sparkling eyes, from The Gondoliers (Sullivan). 1907
- 3-2911 John's wife (Roeckel). 1907
- 3-2963 Eldorado (Mallison). 1908
- 3-2968 There is a flower that bloometh, from Maritana (Vincent Wallace). 1908
- 3-2984 At the mid hour of night (Cowen). 1908
- 3-2985 Green Grow the Rashes, O. 1908
- 4-2552 Ninetta (Brewer). 1915 (E34)
- 4-2614 O may my dreams come true (Fothergill). 1915 (E34)
- 02092 Cielo e mar, from La Gioconda (Ponchielli). 1907
- 02100 Dai campi, dai prati, from Mefistofele (Boito). 1907
- 02108 Lohengrin's farewell, from Lohengrin (Wagner). 1907
- 02109 Lohengrin's narration, from Lohengrin (Wagner). 1907
- 02111 Come into the garden, Maud (Balfe). 1907
- 02144 Celeste Aida, from Aida (Verdi). 1908
- 02145 Watchman's scene, from Hymn of Praise (Mendelssohn). 1908
- 02172 Too late! (Atkins). 1909
- 02584 In the Dawn (Elgar). 1915
- 052219 Cielo e mar, from La Gioconda (Ponchielli). 1908
- 052223 Giunto sul passo estremo, from Mefistofele (Boito). 1908

== Images ==
- In Kobbe 1922: John Coates as Siegfried (p195), Tristan (p229) and as Dick Johnson (La Fanciulla del West, Puccini)(p675).
- In Scott 1979: John Coates portrait, Pl 125 (p171).
- In Lee-Browne 1999: John Coates as Hoffmann, Plate vii.

== Sources ==
- T. Beecham, A Mingled Chime (Hutchinson, 1944).
- T. Beecham, Frederick Delius (Hutchinson, 1959).
- J.R. Bennett, Voices of the Past: Catalogue of Vocal recordings from the English Catalogue of the Gramophone Company, etc. (1955).
- J.R. Bennett, Voices of the Past Vol. 2: Catalogue of Vocal recordings from the Italian Catalogues of the Gramophone Company, etc. (Oakwood Press, 1967).
- D. Bispham, A Quaker Singer's recollections (Macmillan, New York 1920).
- G. Davidson, Opera Biographies (Werner Laurie, London 1955).
- A. Eaglefield-Hull (Ed), A Dictionary of Modern Music and Musicians (Dent, London 1924).
- W. Elwes and R. Elwes, Gervase Elwes, The Story of his Life (Grayson and Grayson, London 1935).
- G. Kobbé, The Complete Opera Book, 1st English Edn (Putnam's, London 1922).
- M. Lee-Browne, Nothing so Charming as Musick! The Life and Times of Frederic Austin (Thames, London 1999).
- G. Moore, Am I too Loud? (Hamish Hamilton 1962).
- H. Rosenthal and J. Warrack, Concise Oxford Dictionary of Opera (Corrected Edition) (London 1974).
- Musical Times, 1 December 1911.
- M. Scott, The Record of Singing Vol 2: 1914-1925 (Duckworth, London 1979).
- H. Wood, My Life of Music (Gollancz, London 1938).
- P.M. Young, Letters of Edward Elgar and other writings (Geoffrey Bles, London 1956).
