= Marie Brema =

British operatic soprano (1856–1925)

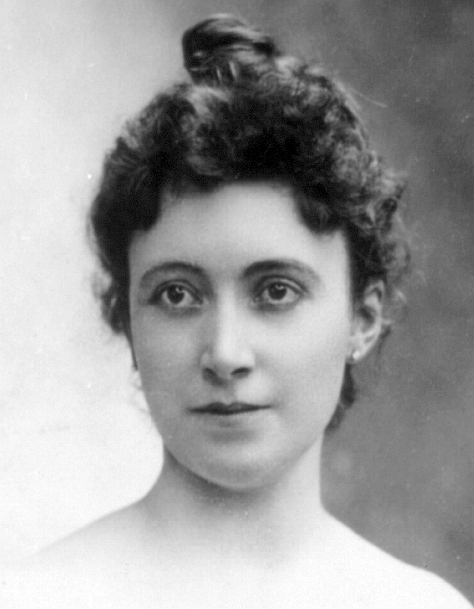
Marie Brema in 1897

Marie Brema (28 February 1856 – 22 March 1925) was a British dramatic mezzo-soprano active in concert, operatic and oratorio roles during the last decade of the 19th and the first decade of the 20th centuries. She was the first British singer to appear at the Bayreuth Festspielhaus.

== Origins and training ==
Marie Brema was born Marie Agnes Fehrmann (also known as Minnie Fehrmann) in Liverpool of a German father Diederich Fehrmann (from Bremen) and an American mother, Cora Wooster Javis. She was brought up among people who enjoyed music and drama, but took no professional interest in music until her marriage in 1874 to Arthur Frederick Braun, a cotton merchant of German origins.

She was encouraged to undergo vocal training, which she did, but it was several years more (after 3 months of study with George Henschel) that she first appeared before the public, singing Schubert's Ganymed in a popular concert. She was so admired that she continued training under other teachers and made further concert appearances. Her stage debut was in 1891 at Oxford as Adriana Lecouvreur.

== Early career ==
On 10 October 1891 (aged 35), taking her stage name from her father's birthplace, she made her opera debut in the first English production of Mascagni's Cavalleria rusticana, as Lola, at the Shaftesbury Theatre, London. (This was under Arditi, and opposite Francesco Vignas as Turiddu: the new opera was a sensation.) A performance was given before Queen Victoria at Windsor Castle in November 1891.

She achieved a success, and followed it with a greater one in Gluck's Orfeo ed Euridice later in the same year. Shaw witnessed some early appearances in London, for instance in May 1892 an encored performance of Welsing's setting of Love's Philosophy, and in July in a Miscellaneous Concert (with Ellen Terry, Joseph Hollman, etc).

She had won Shaw's admiration in a performance of Schubert's Erlkonig, but now he found her he found her insufficiently versatile, over-specialized, with a fixed vocal colour owing to over-emphasis of the dramatic lower register: and recommended that she should permit instead the simple beauty of sound in the upper part of her voice to be heard, when she should take high rank as a singer.

In February 1893, at a Royal Albert Hall performance of Gounod's Redemption (with Miss Palliser and Watkin Mills), he thought she sang 'While my watch I am keeping' 'with a gentler vocal touch and a nearer approach to purely lyric style than I had heard from her before', saying she might now become the successor of Mme Belle Cole. In April 1893, at a Philharmonic concert (also featuring Sapellnikoff in Chopin's E major concerto), "happening to be tremendously in the dramatic vein, she positively rampaged through a Schiller-Joachim scena and through Beethoven's Creation Hymn, scandalizing the Philharmonic, but carrying away the multitude."

Shaw, who did not admire Brahms, praised Marie Brema's introduction of the Harzreise im Winter in February 1894, for though he thought Goethe's words had been 'dehumanised' (by Brahms) and that she sang 'without twopenn'orth of feeling', she had 'a thousand pounds' worth of intelligence and dramatic resolution. She has of late made a remarkable conquest of the art of singing.' He had once thought her voice would not last five years, but admitted that now it might last for fifty. The signs of wear and tear had vanished, and 'the sustained note at the end was a model of vocal management. In any reasonably artistic country,' he added, 'Miss Brema would be pursuing a remarkable career on the lyric stage instead of wasting her qualities on the concert platform.'

His recommendation was not wasted, but the concert platform did not lose her. In 1894 Brema created the part of the Evil Spirit in Sir Hubert Parry's King Saul at the Birmingham Festival. During the operatic career which followed, she continued to sing frequently at concerts and oratorios at the music festivals in Great Britain.

== Bayreuth, America and Europe ==
She was then brought to the notice of Cosima Wagner by Hermann Levi, and was invited to take part in the Richard Wagner Festival at Bayreuth, where she sang the roles of Ortrud in Lohengrin and Kundry in Parsifal. She was the first English singer to appear there. Established as a Wagnerian, in 1894 she made her first tour of the United States of America with the Damrosch Company, and in addition to those two roles also appeared as Brangäne in Tristan und Isolde and Brünnhilde in Die Walküre.

Her Brünnhilde was considered especially fine, not only for her splendid vocalisation but also for her stature and handsome appearance. Returning to Europe she performed these roles at Bayreuth, and added to them the second Brünnhilde (Götterdämmerung) and Fricka in Das Rheingold.

In America Marie Brema sang Brangäne in a German Tristan in a cast with Lillian Nordica as Isolde, Jean de Reszke as Tristan and brother Edouard as King Mark, and also in The Ring, performances under the direction of Anton Seidl and Felix Mottl. During the 1898–99 season at the Met she sang Fides in Meyerbeer's Le prophète opposite both de Reszkes and Lilli Lehmann. In various parts of Europe, in Paris, Berlin and Brussels, for example, she appeared with great success as Dalila in Saint-Saëns's Samson et Dalila, a role which especially suited her, and as Amneris in Verdi's Aida. Orfeo remained a most important role throughout her career. In the London 1897 season David Bispham, (Wotan in Walküre), called her 'superb' alongside Ernest van Dyck, Susan Strong and Ernestine Schumann-Heink, and Klein ranked her with the greats in the casts of Felix Mottl's revival of The Ring at Covent Garden.

In 1897 Brema was among those invited to perform at the State Jubilee Concert at Buckingham Palace, where she sang 'Plus grand dans son Obscurité' from Gounod's La reine de Saba. Other performers included Bispham, Nevada, de Lucia and Mme Albani. Brema and Bispham sang again by royal invitation at Osborne House not long afterwards.

In 1897 Brema performed the Wesendonck Lieder of Wagner (Felix Mottl arrangement) at the Queen's Hall for Henry Wood on a Wagner birthday concert (22 May), and later in the same programme delivered Brünnhilde's Immolation scene. Wood enjoyed working with her, and called her 'a really great Wagnerian singer.' He remarked that she could dramatise the parts she portrayed without making gestures, and was 'certainly German in style.' In 1898 she introduced Saint-Saëns's La fiancee du timbalier. In November and December 1900 she appeared for Wood in three special Wagnerian concerts at the Royal Albert Hall, with orchestras of 200 members.

== Gerontius and Elgar ==
In October 1900, at the Birmingham Triennial Music Festival, Marie Brema created the role of the angel in the first performance of Sir Edward Elgar's The Dream of Gerontius, with Edward Lloyd and Harry Plunket Greene, under the baton of Hans Richter. The performance was not a great success, owing partly to the difficult and somewhat revolutionary nature of the composition, and the comparatively short time that had been available for the artists to prepare it. She performed it again, this time under Elgar's baton, at the 1902 Sheffield Festival, with John Coates and David Ffrangcon-Davies: in the same concert Ysaÿe played the Beethoven concerto. The same soloists gave the second London performance of the Dream at the Queen's Hall, with the newly formed London Choral Society, in February 1904.

In the following years the role of the Angel was more often taken by the leading English contralto Louise Kirkby Lunn, also a celebrated Wagnerian singer (Ortrud, Kundry, Brangane and Fricka), Amneris and Dalilah, and in many ways a successor to Marie Brema, though without her range for a compelling Brünnhilde. In 1903, writing to Brema of her original performance, Elgar wrote 'I have, of course, in memory your fine and intellectual creation of the part; and though I never thought the 'tessitura' suited you well, as the magnificent artist you are, you made it go very finely.'

== Later career ==
Herman Klein, describing the London musical scene circa 1900, noted the absence of leading English-born contralto singers, apart from the three notable exceptions of Clara Butt, Marie Brema and Kirkby Lunn. Of Marie Brema he wrote that she was more correctly a mezzo-soprano, distinguished by 'her admirable command of tone-colour, her faultless diction, and her infinitely varied shades of impassioned poetic expression.'

Brema appeared opposite David Bispham again in the premiere of Stanford's opera Much Ado About Nothing, as Beatrice to his Benedick, in a cast also including John Coates, Suzanne Adams and Pol Plançon. This was for the Covent Garden 1901 season. In 1902 she sang Brünnhilde (in German) in Paris for Hans Richter. In January 1908 she organised three concerts given in Brussels, in which Gervase Elwes joined her in the solo quartets of the Brahms Liebeslieder.

In 1910–11 she organised an opera season of her own at the Savoy Theatre, singing Orfeo in English. According to Henry Wood, her training of the chorus to project the diction into the auditorium was wonderful and inscrutable. This season was conducted by Frank Bridge. In 1912 she toured the provinces with the Denhof Opera Company. After this she retired from the stage.

== Teaching career ==
Following her retirement Brema became director of the opera class at the Royal Manchester College of Music. Among those to benefit from her instruction were Luella Paikin and Heddle Nash.

She was chair of the Society of Women Musicians in 1917–1918.

She died in Manchester, aged 69, from undisclosed causes.

== Personal life ==
Although Brema's marriage to Braun produced two children, (Arthur) Francis (1876-1940) and Helen (1879-1964), it proved unhappy, and the couple eventually separated. Both of the children later became performers like their mother: Francis became a classical baritone, and Helen became an actor, under the stage name of "Tita Brand", playing for George Bernard Shaw and Frank Benson. Brand was a large woman with a deep speaking voice, capable of reciting Grieg's Bergliot audibly over an unsubdued orchestra conducted by Henry Wood.

Brand later married the Belgian scholar, poet and writer Emile Cammaerts, with whom she had six children, including Pieter Cammaerts, who was killed while serving in the Royal Air Force during World War II, prominent SOE operative Francis Cammaerts and Catherine Noel "Kippe" Cammaerts, an actress. After the outbreak of war in 1914, Sir Edward Elgar composed a symphonic accompaniment "Carillon" for a patriotic poem "Chantons, Belges, Chantons" by Cammaerts which was first performed with the recitation by Brand.

In later years Brema lived at 17 Launceston Place, Kensington, and after the outbreak of the First World War at Launceston Cottage in Radlett, next door to her daughter and grandchildren. By her family's account, she was a generous, extravagant, and dominating personality. Her grandson Francis later ruefully described her as "a gifted musician but spoilt by excess of success. She no longer understood the value of money or what it meant in the world." Both Brema and her daughter were committed Christian Socialists, and founded "Brema Looms", a workshop intended to provide employment to young disabled women from London's east end.

Through her granddaughter Kippe Cammaerts, Marie Brema is the great-grandmother of the author Michael Morpurgo.

== Sources ==
- G. Davidson, Opera Biographies (Werner Laurie, London 1955)
- W. Elwes and R. Elwes, Gervase Elwes The Story of his Life (London 1935)
- H. Klein, Thirty Years of Musical Life in London (Century Co, New York 1903)
- H. Rosenthal and J Warrack, Concise Oxford Dictionary of Opera (London 1974 Edn)
- G.B. Shaw, Music in London 1890–1894, 3 vols, (London, 1932)
- H. Wood, My Life of Music (London, 1938)
- P.M. Young, Letters of Edward Elgar (Geoffrey Bles, London 1956)

== See also ==
- Contemporary article on Marie Brema
- Contemporary article on Marie Brema
- Marie Brema with her daughter Tita Brand
