= Much Ado About Nothing (opera) =

1901 opera

Much Ado About Nothing is an opera in four acts by Charles Villiers Stanford (his Op. 76a), to a libretto by Julian Sturgis based on Shakespeare's play Much Ado About Nothing. It was the composer's seventh completed opera.

== Performance history ==
It premiered at the Royal Opera House, Covent Garden on 30 May 1901, conducted by Luigi Mancinelli, when it was "well, but not rapturously received by the public", and given one further performance four days later. The Manchester Guardian commented, "Not even in the Falstaff of Arrigo Boito and Giuseppe Verdi have the characteristic charm, the ripe and pungent individuality of the original comedy been more sedulously preserved."

The opera was performed in German translation in Leipzig in 1902.

It was revived at the 1964 Wexford Opera Festival in a production directed by Peter Ebert and by Opera Viva at the Jeannetta Cochrane Theatre, London in March 1985. In 2019 Northern Opera Group performed the opera as part of the Leeds Opera Festival, with a reduced orchestration by Chris Pelly.

A 17-minute ensemble from Act 1 (pages 38 to 63 of vocal score), recorded 'live' at a concert at St John's, Smith Square, London, on 12 February 1983 was included on a 1985 double-LP Opera Viva issue conducted by Leslie Head. A Beatrice-Benedick duet from the same section (pages 46 to 54 of vocal score) was recorded 'live' at a Europe Day Concert at St John's, Smith Square, on 9 May 2013.

== Roles ==
Role	Voice type	Premiere Cast, 30 May 1901 (Conductor: Luigi Mancinelli)
Hero	soprano	Suzanne Adams
Beatrice	soprano	Marie Brema
Don Pedro, prince of Aragon	baritone	Ivor Foster
Don John, his bastard brother	bass	
Claudio	tenor	John Coates
Benedick	baritone	David Bispham
Friar	bass	Pol Plançon
Dogberry	bass	Robert Blass
Verges	speaking role	O. B. Clarence
Leonato, governor of Messina	bass or baritone	Putnam Griswold
Borrachio	tenor	Walter Hyde
Seacole	tenor	
