= Denhof Opera Company =

Ernst Denhof in about 1910

The Denhof Opera Company was an Edinburgh-based professional opera company founded in 1910 by Ernst Denhof to perform Wagner's The Ring of the Nibelung in English. It was the first major opera-performing Company to be established with a base in Scotland. After a series of financial losses it was taken over by Thomas Beecham in 1913 who used it as the basis for his Beecham Opera Company.

Cicely Gleeson-White as Brünnhilde in Denhof's 1911 Siegfried

The Denhof Opera Company was formed in 1910 by Ernst Denhof (1862-1936), an Austrian-born Swiss pianist, musical impresario and teacher based in Edinburgh in Scotland who was inspired by Wagner's The Ring of the Nibelung cycles given at the Royal Opera House at Covent Garden in 1908 to give performances of The Ring in English in Scotland. Denhof hired The Scottish Orchestra augmented with players from London while many of the singers from the Covent Garden performances in 1908 were also hired, including Agnes Nicholls as Brünnhilde, Robert Radford as Hunding and Fasolt, Francis Maclennan (1873-1935), an American tenor with the Moody-Manners Opera Company as Siegmund in The Valkyrie and as Siegfried, and his wife Florence Easton as Freia, Sieglinde, the Woodbird in the first cycle and Gutrune. Edna Thornton sang Erda in Das Rheingold, Thomas Meux was Alberich in The Ring, Sydney Russell was Mime and Frederic Austin was Wotan in Das Rheingold and later The Wanderer in Siegfried. The elaborate sets and costumes were from Germany.

Opening performance from Wagner's The Valkyrie (1911)

The Company's first series in 1910 was under the baton of conductor Michael Balling, who had just returned from Bayreuth where he had conducted from 1906 to 1909; this first series was a success and lead Denhof to take his new Company on a tour of the provinces where it gave performances at Leeds, Manchester and Glasgow in 1911, and Hull, Leeds, Liverpool, Manchester and Glasgow in 1912 using local orchestras. Later the Company gave the first performances in English of Strauss's Elektra as well as performances of Gluck’s Orfeo ed Euridice, The Flying Dutchman and The Master-Singers of Nuremberg. By 1913 the Company numbered 200 members, including an orchestra of 82, a chorus of 90 and a ballet of 24. That year it gave the first productions in English of Der Rosenkavalier, Pelléas et Mélisande and Die Zauberflöte. After two weeks performing in Birmingham and one in Manchester Denhof suffered financial losses of £4000 and the Company was taken over by Thomas Beecham, one of the conductors for the 1913 season, who financed and completed most of the Company's scheduled performances and who used it to create the core of what became the Beecham Opera Company. Somewhat chastened, Ernst Denhof returned to the relative obscurity of teaching music in Edinburgh and died in Exeter on 5 December 1936.

Performers with the Company included John Coates, Marie Brema, Thomas Beecham, Frederic Austin, Frank Mullings, Clytie Hine, Michael Balling and Caroline Hatchard.
