= Derby Day (light opera) =

1932 three-act light opera

- Light opera by Alfred Reynolds
- Librettist: A. P. Herbert
- Language: English
- Premiere: 24 February 1932; Lyric Theatre, London

Derby Day is a 1932 three-act light opera, with music composed by Alfred Reynolds to a libretto by A. P. Herbert. Herbert wrote his text between March and May 1931, whilst on a trip to Australia, during the first run of his successful Tantivy Towers.

One contemporary review described the work as "mainly a Cockney opera", and praised the work as "topical in the best sense" and said of the music:

I do not know if Mr. Reynolds is himself a Cockney, but I do know that his Cockney music, particularly in the coster scenes, is the best that has ever been written.

In particular, the song for the tipster, "'Oo wants a winner for the big race tomorrer?", has been singled out for particular praise as a musical expression of the Cockney.

== Original production ==
The first performance took place at the Lyric Theatre, Hammersmith on 24 February 1932. The director was Nigel Playfair, and the production was designed by George Sheringham. Alfred Reynolds was the conductor. The original cast list was as follows:

- Scott Russell as John Bitter (landlord of the Old Black Horse)
- Tessa Deane as Rose (a barmaid)
- Leslie French as Bert Bones (a tipster)
- Mabel Constanduros as Mrs Bones (his mother)
- Frederic Austin as Sir Horace Waters, J.P. (a race-horse owner) in his last stage appearance
- Mabel Sealby as Lady Waters (his wife)
- Dewey Gibson as Eddy (their son)
- Guelda Waller as a Gypsy Woman
- Dewey Gibson as a Bookmaker
- John Thompson as a Policeman
- Pamela Stanley in a walk-on role, making her stage début.

== Synopsis ==
The story is set in the present day (the early 1930s), and centres on a day at The Derby, the major horse-racing event of the year. In Act III, Mr Bitter proposes to Mrs Bones.

== Broadcasts ==
The BBC broadcast an abridged radio version of the work in 1932 and 1934. It was also broadcast twice in 1937, on Derby Day itself and two days later on the day the Oaks was run.

Derby Day was shown in a 40-minute broadcast on BBC television in July 1937, with a cast including George Baker as Mr. Bitter and Frederick Ranalow (who had appeared in the Playfair/Austin production of The Beggar's Opera) as Waters. It was broadcast again in June 1938 with Muriel George and Esmond Knight, and Baker and Ranalow swapping roles.
