= The Boatswain's Mate =

- Opera by Ethel Smyth
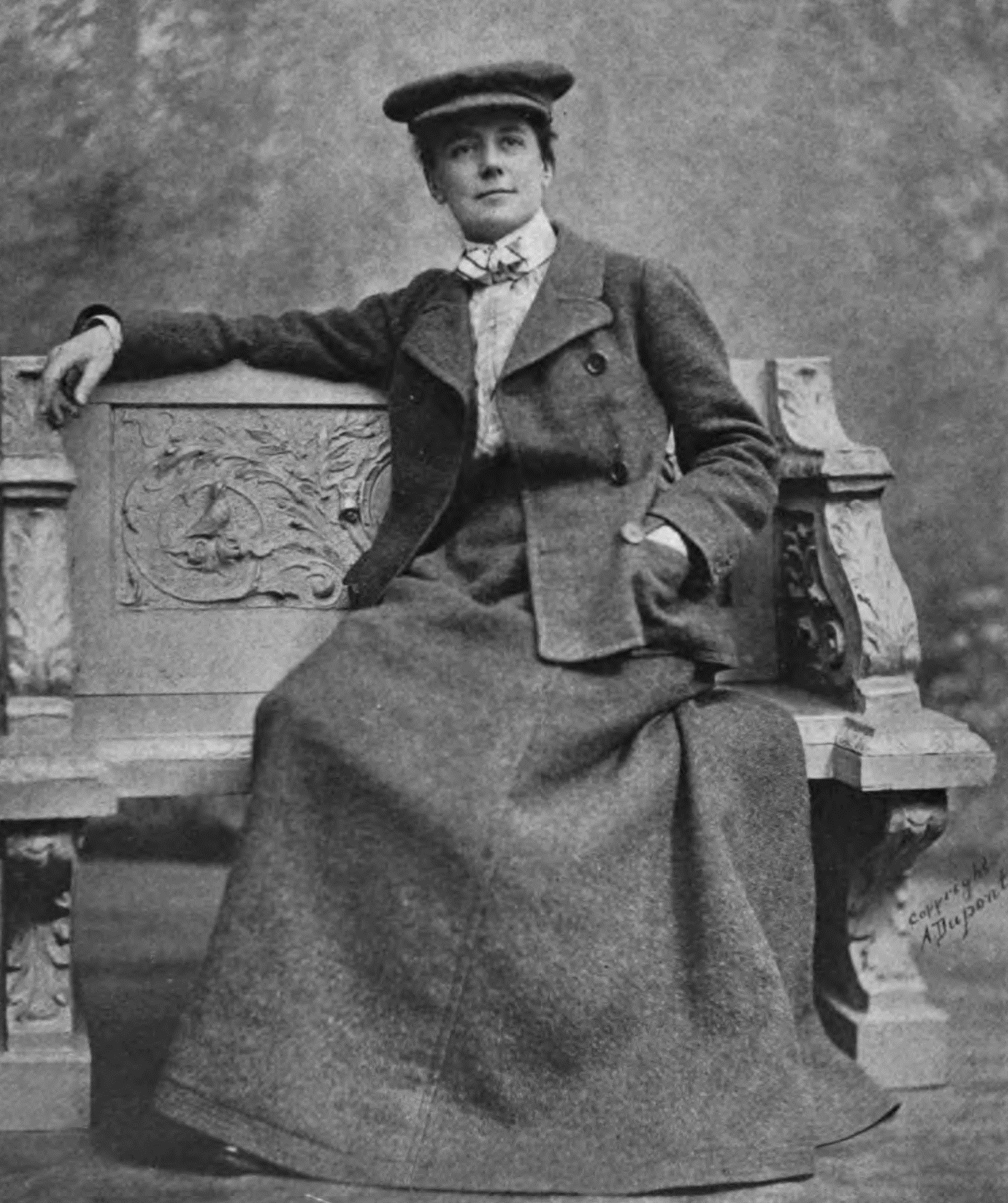
- Ethel Smyth, no later than 1903
- Librettist: Ethel Smyth
- Based on: "The Boatswain's Mate", story by W. W. Jacobs
- Premiere: 28 January 1916; Shaftesbury Theatre, London

The Boatswain's Mate is an opera in one act (but in two parts) written by British composer and suffragette Ethel Smyth in 1913–14 set to her own libretto, which was based on a story of the same name by W. W. Jacobs.

It was Smyth's fourth opera, and it is sometimes claimed as a feminist opera. The piece centers around a humorous battle of the sexes featuring a feisty and resourceful heroine who outwits her scheming suitor (but perhaps falls for his accomplice—this is left to the speculation of the reader or audience).

In summary, the opera's score has been described by Stephen Banfield as "interspersed with spoken dialogue in part 1, [it] is symphonically constructed around folksongs and Smyth's own March of the Women; its pacing and orchestration are adroitly managed."

== Performance history ==
From December 1913 to May 1914, Smyth stayed at a hotel in Helwan, Egypt, in order to compose The Boatswain's Mate free from distractions, although she kept up a continual correspondence with Emmeline Pankhurst. The hotel, formerly the palace of Tewfik Pasha, was suggested by her friend Ronald Storrs, who was an official under Lord Kitchener in Cairo. On returning to Europe, Smyth arranged for the opera's premiere to take place at Frankfurt in March 1915, as well as scheduling her earlier opera The Wreckers for February 1915 in Munich. However, these plans were overtaken by the outbreak of World War I.

The first performance of The Boatswain's Mate eventually took place at the Shaftesbury Theatre, London, on 28 January 1916 under Smyth. Thomas Beecham entrusted the premiere to Eugene Goossens but on the day "[t]he composer herself elected to conduct the première of her work—much to my annoyance, as I had taken all the preliminary orchestral rehearsals. At the last moment she took over the baton, thinking herself the Heaven-sent conductor she was not."

The opera uses a number of folk melodies, including "The Keeper" and "Lord Randall", as well as "Bushes and Briars", which provides the theme for the intermezzo. The overture was based on Smyth's earlier composition, "The March of the Women". Reviews in The Times drew a distinction between the ballad opera style of part 1, with its light-hearted dialogue and songs, and the sung-through style of part 2, which they found heavy and less appropriate to the libretto. The chorus of agricultural labourers in part 1 was also praised.

The opera was performed with full orchestra and chorus a number of times at the Royal Opera House, Covent Garden, in the 1920s. Smyth's music subsequently went out of fashion and no productions had been recorded for more than 50 years until a chamber version of the opera was arranged by the Primavera Productions theatre company at the Finborough Theatre in London in June 2007.

In 2018, The Boatswain's Mate was performed at the Grimeborn Festival, Arcola Theatre, London.

== Roles ==
Roles, voice types, premiere cast
Role	Voice type	Premiere cast, 28 January 1916 (Conductor: Ethel Smyth)
Mrs Waters	soprano	Rosina Buckman
Harry Benn	tenor	Courtice Pounds
Ned Travers	baritone	Frederick Ranalow
Policeman	bass-baritone	Arthur Wynn
Mary-Ann	(spoken)	Norah Roy
Male chorus 'Two cats'		M. Voxo

== Synopsis ==
Place: England
Time: 20th century

=== Part One ===
Mrs Waters is a widow running a lonely country inn called "The Beehive". She has no wish to remarry. Among her customers is a retired boatswain, Harry Benn. After rejecting his latest offers of marriage, she goes off on an errand, leaving him minding the pub. He decides on a plot to win her heart, and sets it in motion when Ned Travers, a broke ex-soldier, comes in. Benn persuades him to pretend to burgle the inn, so that Benn can play the heroic rescuer.

=== Part Two ===
That night, Travers breaks in. Seeing Mrs Waters come down the stairs with a gun, he hides in a cupboard, and she locks him in. When she threatens to shoot, he tells her the truth and agrees to help her get revenge. She discharges the gun and screams for help, while Travers hides upstairs. Benn rushes in, but is horrified when she tells him she has killed the burglar. She sends Benn outside to dig a grave. Overcome with remorse, he gives himself up to a passing policeman. They come inside, only to find Travers alive and well, and depart in confusion. Mrs Waters is left alone with the charming Travers, and her opposition to marriage starts to weaken.

== Recordings ==
On 2 October 1916, Smyth conducted excerpts from the opera with members of the original cast. From Part One, the overture (featuring Gilbert Barton and W. Gordon Walker, piccolos), “When rocked on the billows” (Courtice Pounds), “The Keeper” (Barton and Gordon Walker), “A friend and I were on a pier” (Frederick Ranalow), “Contrariness - What if I were young again” (Rosina Buckman). From Part Two, “Oh! dear, if I had known” (Buckman and Ranalow), “The first thing to do is get rid of the body” (Buckman, Pounds and Ranalow) and “When the sun is setting” (Buckman and Ranalow). The recordings were issued by His Master's Voice as “Overture” (parts 1 & 2, D. 445), “When rocked on the billows” (D. 446), “The Keeper” (D. 448), “A friend and I were on a pier” (D. 447), (a) “Contrariness” (b) “What if I were young again” (D. 448), “Oh! dear, if I had known” (D. 448), “The first thing to do is get rid of the body” (D. 447), “When the sun is setting” (D. 447).

The first complete, modern recording of the 75-minute opera was released by Retrospect Opera in July 2016, conducted by the Smyth interpreter and champion Odaline de la Martinez. This two-CD release also includes transfers of all of the excerpts from the opera recorded by Smyth in 1916.

The overture features on recordings by the Bournemouth Symphony Orchestra conducted by Ronald Corp (Dutton Laboratories, CDLX 7276), and by the BBC National Orchestra of Wales conducted by Rumon Gamba (Chandos, CHAN 10898).

Two arias sung by Mrs Waters ("What if I were young again" and "Suppose you mean to do a given thing") have been recorded by EMI as part of a CD of Ethel Smyth's music.
