= Tudor Davies =

Welsh tenor (1892–1958)

Tudor Davies (12 November 1892 – 2 April 1958) was a Welsh tenor.

== Biography ==
Tudor Davies was born in Cymmer, near Porth, South Wales, on 12 November 1892. He studied in Cardiff and at the Royal College of Music in London. He served as an engineer in the Royal Navy during World War I. He toured the United States, Canada and Australia (where he shared the stage with Maggie Teyte) and then returned to Britain, where he sang with the British National Opera Company, Sadler's Wells Opera and the Carl Rosa Opera Company. He sang Rodolfo to Dame Nellie Melba's Mimi in La bohème in 1922 at Covent Garden.

He sang a number of leading tenor parts from the Italian, French and German repertoire, such as Lohengrin, Tamino, Florestan, Faust, Don José and the Duke of Mantua. He also appeared in English operas such as Dame Ethel Smyth's Fête Galante, and Arthur Benjamin's The Devil Take Her. He created the title role in Ralph Vaughan Williams' opera Hugh the Drover in 1924, excerpts from which he also recorded. (In 1928, he also sang in the United States premiere of the opera, with the Washington National Opera.) He created Prince Hal in Gustav Holst's At the Boar's Head in 1925. He sang the title role in Giuseppe Verdi's Don Carlos in the opera's first performance in English in 1938, and he appeared in the first Sadler's Wells performance of Nikolai Rimsky-Korsakov's The Snow Maiden.

In his later career, Davies was mainly a concert singer, and teacher in Cardiff.

Davies made a number of recordings, including a complete performance of Giacomo Puccini's Madama Butterfly, and excerpts from Richard Wagner's Der Ring des Nibelungen (including the Love Duet from Siegfried and the Dawn Duet from Götterdämmerung, both with Florence Austral), and The Mastersingers of Nuremberg, and Vaughan Williams's Hugh the Drover. He can also be heard in excerpts from Sir Edward Elgar's The Dream of Gerontius, recorded live in a performance conducted by the composer at Hereford Cathedral in 1927.

Davies married the soprano Ruth Packer, whom he met while working for ENSA during the Second World War. He died on 2 April 1958 in Penallt, Monmouthshire, after surgery for a liver condition.

== Sources ==
- Grove's Dictionary of Music and Musicians, 5th ed. 1954, Eric Blom, ed.
