= Ruth Packer =

English operatic soprano

Ruth Packer (22 October 1910 – 12 January 2005) was an English operatic soprano.

Packer was born in London. In 1939, she made her operatic debut at the Royal Opera House, Covent Garden in Die Walküre. During World War Two, she appeared frequently with Sadler's Wells Opera and the Carl Rosa Opera Company. After the war, she performed regularly with the newly formed Welsh National Opera.

After her retirement from the stage, Packer taught voice at the Royal College of Music, and later privately.

Packer married two Welshmen, first the tenor Tudor Davies (1892–1958), and, secondly, Maj. Ynyr Probert. She was twice widowed, and had no children.

She died in São Bras de Alportel, Portugal, aged 94.
