= Horace Stevens =

Operatic bass-baritone (1876–1950)

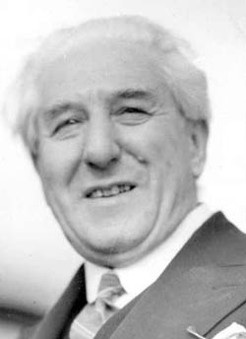
- Horace Stevens, circa 1936
- Born: Horace Ernest Stevens; 26 October 1876; Prahran, Victoria, Australia
- Died: 18 November 1950 (aged 75); South Yarra, Victoria
- Resting place: St Paul's Cathedral, Melbourne; 37.816853°S 144.967384°E
- Occupations: Operatic bass-baritone dentist army officer singing teacher sculler
- Years active: 1918–1949
- Spouse(s): Nellie Chapman (m. 26 August 1905 – d. 1931); Ella Elizabeth Hallam (m. 5 December 1934 – 18 November 1950, Stevens' death)
- Children: 3

Horace Ernest Stevens (26 October 1876 – 18 November 1950) was an Australian bass-baritone opera singer, army officer during the First World War, singing teacher, and sculler.

== Early life and career ==
Stevens was born on 26 October 1876 in Prahran, Melbourne, Australia to Horace Stevens, a dentist and Fanny Stevens (née Gittins), a homemaker. In 1884, at the age of 8, he joined the All Saints Grammar School and Anglican Church in St Kilda, where he sang in the choir. The choir was being trained in singing for the 1891 opening of St Paul's Cathedral. Climbing up the ranks, Stevens became a lay clerk in 1898 and a few years later, as a temporary choirmaster. He resigned from the choir in 1949. An apprentice to his father, the younger Stevens was also a dentist for twenty years. He worked as his father's dental clinic, which was situated in Collins Street, Melbourne. Stevens served as an army officer during the First World War, during which he attained the title of Honorary Lieutenant. He served on HMAT Medic, A7. In 1918, Stevens was invalided to England. After performing impromptu at a café in London, he was persuaded by Sir Henry Wood to give up dentistry and take up singing as a career. In 1919, Stevens made his debut as an opera singer in Elijah with the Queen's Hall Orchestra, in which he sang the title role. His performance received positive comment, with Sir Edward Elgar dubbing him as the "best Elijah" of the period. Stevens went on to perform at many major music festivals in the UK and the United States. He returned to Australia in 1934.

He also appeared with the British National Opera Company as Wotan and other Wagnerian roles.

In his later years, Stevens gave music lessons at the University of Melbourne from 1938 until his death in 1950.

== Personal life ==
An undefeated champion sculler until his retirement at 35, Stevens was also an active marksman and tennis player. A member of the London and Melbourne Savage Clubs, he was said to be a bohemian.

On 26 August 1905, Stevens married Nellie Chapman, who died in 1931. On 5 December 1934, Stevens married Australian builder and constructor Ella Elizabeth Hallam (née Davis) at Scots' Church, Melbourne. They had three sons.

== Death and legacy ==
On 18 November 1950, Stevens died of an unanticipated coronary occlusion-caused heart attack at his house in South Yarra, Melbourne. His death was said to have been "sudden". His funeral service was at St Paul's Cathedral in Melbourne, and he was cremated.

One of the houses in the ensemble Choir Victoria, Stevens, is named after him.
