= Frank Mullings =

British opera singer

Frank Mullings (10 May 1881 – 19 May 1953) was a leading English tenor with Sir Thomas Beecham's Beecham Opera Company and its successor, the British National Opera Company, during the 1910s and 1920s. Blessed with a strong stage presence and a voice that provoked varying reactions from critics, his repertoire included such taxing dramatic parts as Tristan in Tristan und Isolde, Radames in Aida, the title role in Otello, and Canio in Pagliacci. The limitations of early microphones meant that his voice was not always recorded successfully, although the British National Opera Company website notes that playing the recordings at 80 rpm produces a more reliable result.

Mullings was born in Walsall. He studied singing in Birmingham and made his operatic début in Coventry in 1907—in Faust by Gounod. He joined the Denhof Opera Company in 1913, was engaged by the Beecham Opera Company from 1916 to 1921, and was with the British National Opera Company from 1922 until its closure in 1929. He was the first to sing the part of Wagner's Parsifal in English, which he did at the Royal Opera House, Covent Garden, in 1919.

Mullings was a noted interpreter, in England at least, of Verdi's Otello, as well as Tristan by Wagner. He created the role of Hadyar in Nail by Isidore de Lara, and the role of Apollo in Alkestis by Rutland Boughton.

The English music critic Neville Cardus, who came to know Mullings well, wrote in one of his press reviews that: "Mr. Mullings acted Canio in Pagliacci far beyond the plane of conventional Italian opera of the blood and sand order. His singing is not exactly all honey, but how intensely he lived in the part! He almost persuades us that there is real tragedy about –- that if the puppet Canio were pricked, blood and not sawdust would come forth." On the other hand, the historian John Cawte Beaglehole, who as a young man in London saw Mullings perform in The Damnation of Faust by Berlioz, found him disappointing: "... supposed to be a great tenor; [he was] a red-faced cove who sang in a strangled ineffective stupid fashion; still, you never know, he may have been drunk."

At the height of his fame, Mullings joined the staff of the Birmingham School of Music, teaching voice, and working from 1927 through to 1946. He also taught at the Royal Manchester College of Music from 1944 to 1949. Mullings died at the age of 72 in Manchester.

His voice is preserved in a number of 78-rpm gramophone records which testify to the sincerity of his interpretations but highlight the limitations of his vocal technique, as hinted at politely by Cardus in the quotation cited above. Michael Scott (author of The Record of Singing, Volume 2, published by Duckworth in 1979), J.B. Steane (The Grand Tradition, Duckworth, 1971) and many other commentators have been less guarded than Cardus, noting the constricted production and distorted vowels of his recorded performances, though even Steane's 2006 Gramophone review of the reissued British National Opera Company's 1927 Columbia recording of Pagliacci noted that "the throatiness and discomfort [of Mullings’s Canio] in the upper range are to some extent offset by a warmly personal timbre and intense dramatic commitment."
