= Alfred Reynolds (composer) =

English composer (1884–1969)

Alfred Reynolds (1884 – 18 October 1969) was a British composer of light music.

== Biography ==
He was born in 1884, in Liverpool, and was educated at Merchant Taylors' School and later in France. He studied with Engelbert Humperdinck in Berlin.

In 1910, he conducted Oscar Straus's The Chocolate Soldier, which he toured in England. He was said to be the youngest operatic conductor in England. He composed for and participated in wartime charity concerts. In 1920 and 1921, Reynolds toured the Far East with the Royal Opera. On his return, he wrote the music for Baroness Orczy's play, Leatherface. Reynolds worked on the revival of 18th century ballad operas.

In 1923, he became musical director of the Lyric Theatre, Hammersmith, where he performed revivals of Sheridan's The Duenna (1924), Lionel And Clarissa (1925), with music mainly by Charles Dibdin, and Love in a Village (1928), with music by Thomas Arne. He wrote incidental music for several plays, including those by Molière, Farquhar, Shakespeare and Goldsmith, and review music for Nigel Playfair. The Lyric staged Reynolds's comic operas The Fountain of Youth and Derby Day.

Reynolds left the Lyric in 1932 for the Birmingham Repertory Theatre. He wrote 1066 And All That (a musical based on the comic book by of that name) and a score for The Swiss Family Robinson.

In 1947, he wrote music for a Stratford-upon-Avon adaptation of Alice in Wonderland and Through the Looking-Glass. A two-act comic opera, The Limpet in the Castle, was premiered in 1958 at Wombwell, Yorkshire.

Much of his theatre music has been played in the concert hall.

Reynolds died on 18 October 1969, aged 84, in Bognor Regis.
