= Beecham Opera Company =

The Beecham Opera Company was an opera company founded by Thomas Beecham which presented opera in English in London and on tour between 1916 and 1920.

The initiative was conceived as part of Beecham's campaign to foster musical life during World War I, after the forced closure of the Covent Garden Opera Company, where the conductor had been mounting opera seasons. Conveniently, Beecham's project was able to draw on many former members of the Edinburgh-based Denhof Opera Company, thereby effectively continuing the earlier company's work. The company was formed with mainly British singers, with New Zealander Rosina Buckman a notable exception; she was assigned the role of a principal dramatic soprano. Supported financially by Beecham's father, Joseph, the new outfit quickly turned into a successful touring company with casts of mainly British singers, including Frank Mullings, who was entrusted with some of the key lead roles.

Beecham's company provided the wartime public with opera performances both around the provinces and in London (at the Drury Lane, Shaftesbury and Aldwych theatres), even during the 1917 Zeppelin raids. The repertoire was extensive, and included productions of works as ambitious as Boris Godunov (in French) and Tristan und Isolde. Although Beecham had intended the company to be a permanent venture, it was disbanded in 1920 when financial problems over buying the Bedford Estate forced him to withdraw temporarily from the music scene. Many of the performers joined the British National Opera Company (1922–1929), a replacement venture which bought the entire assets of the Beecham company, comprising the scenery, costumes, scores, instruments and performing rights for 48 operas.
