= Michael Balling =

German violist and conductor

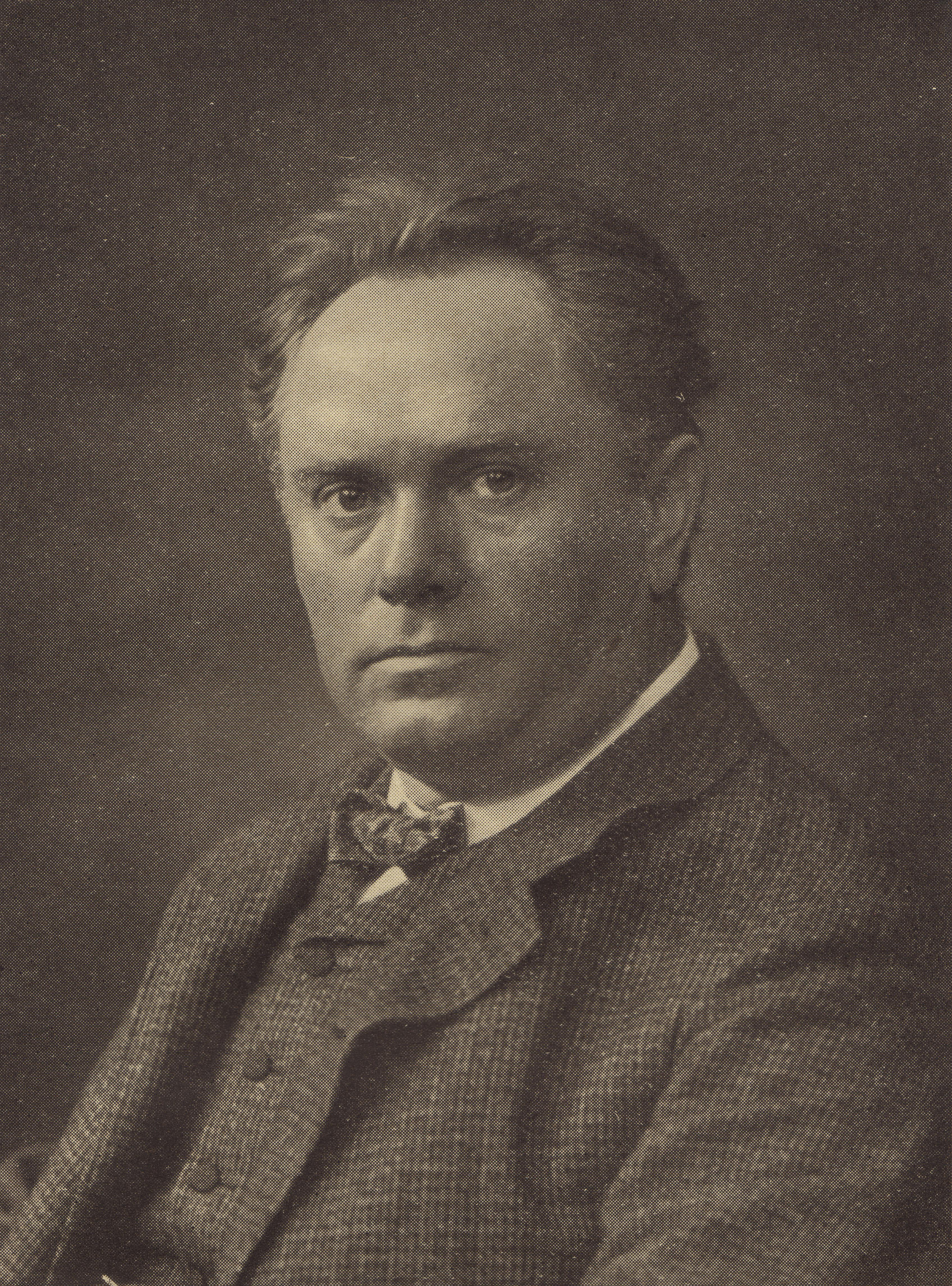
- Born: August 27, 1866; Heidingsfeld, near Würzburg, Germany
- Died: September 1, 1925 (aged 59); Darmstadt, Germany
- Occupation(s): violist, conductor
- Known for: principal conductor of The Hallé (1912–1914)

Michael Balling (27 August 1866 – 1 September 1925) was a German violist and conductor. He served as principal conductor of The Hallé, Manchester, England from 1912 to 1914.

== Biography ==
Michael Balling was born 27 August 1866 in Heidingsfeld, near Würzburg. Balling studied violin with Hermann Ritter at the Hochschule für Musik Würzburg and was an early convert to the viola alta, a large scale viola introduced by Ritter in 1876. By the late 1880s, Balling had established himself as a viola player of some note playing the instrument with great success in Wagner operas at the Bayreuth Festival, and later conducted there from 1906 to 1909 and 1914. Balling also promoted the viola alta in England. In 1910 he was the conductor of the Denhof Opera Company. He died 1 September 1925 in Darmstadt

== Sources ==
- Donald Maurice (Summer 2003). "Michael Balling 1886-1925, Pioneer German Solo Violist with a New Zealand Interlude". Journal of the American Viola Society. Archived from the original on July 17, 2011.
