= Rosina Buckman =

New Zealand singer (1881–1948)

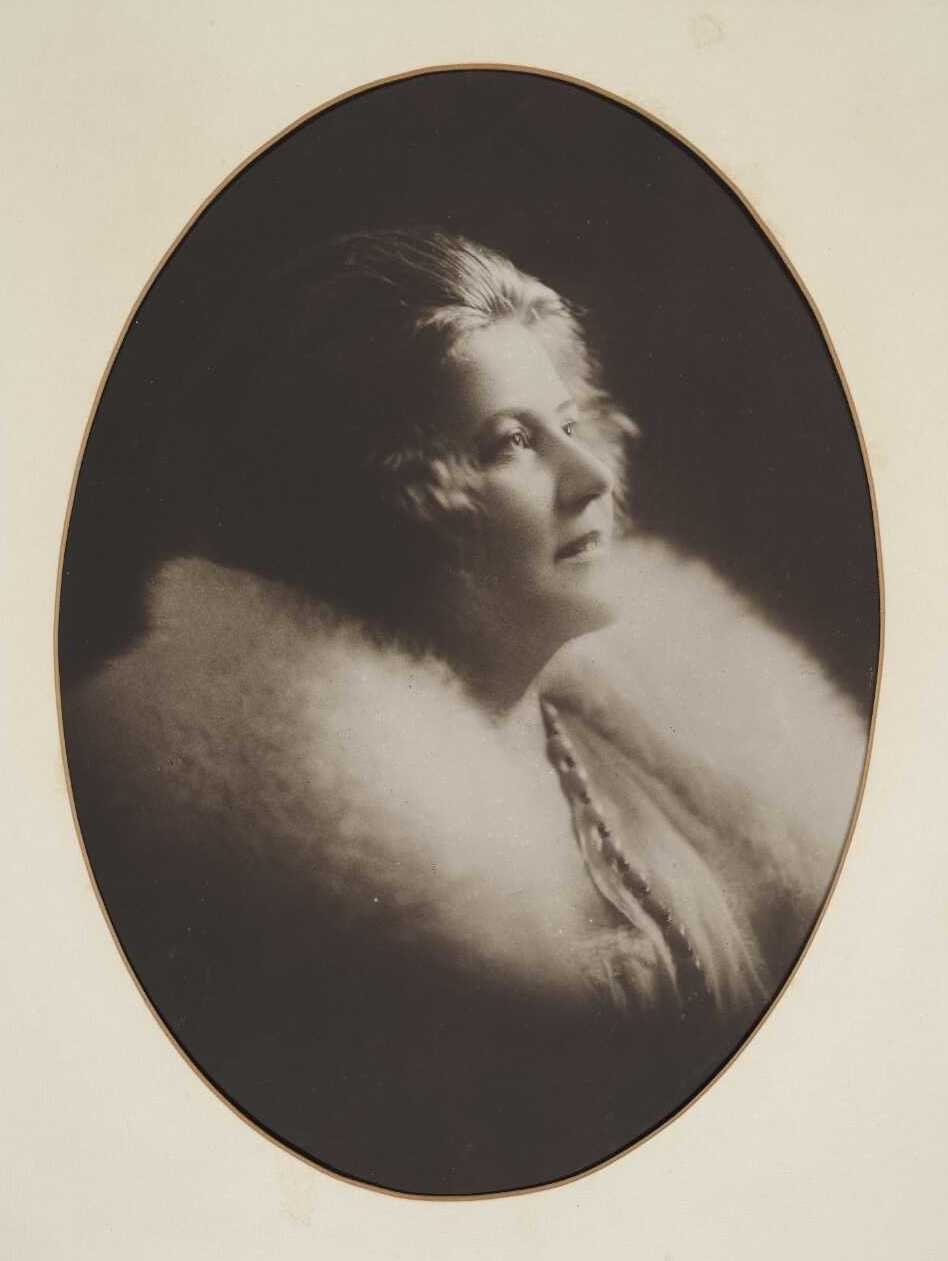
- Buckman in the 1920s
- Born: 16 March 1881; Blenheim, New Zealand
- Died: 31 December 1948 (aged 67); Battersea General Hospital, London, England
- Occupation: Opera singer
- Years active: 1903–1930s
- Known for: one of New Zealand's first international opera stars
- Spouse: Maurice d'Oisly (m. 1919)

Rosina Buckman (16 March 1881 – 31 December 1948) was a New Zealand soprano who became a prima donna during World War I and later a professor of singing at the Royal Academy of Music. She was born in Blenheim, grew up mostly in the North Island and went to England when still a teenager to get a formal singing education from Charles Swinnerton Heap. After Heap's death, she moved to the Birmingham School of Music. Graduating in 1903, she could immediately sustain herself from singing engagements but fell ill and returned to New Zealand the following year. She advanced her career in the country of her birth and had her operatic debut in 1905. Also performing in Australia, she worked for the dominant soprano, Nellie Melba. Encouraged by Melba to apply her talent in England, Buckman moved in 1912. From 1914, she performed alongside Melba, who called her New Zealand's "Queen of Song". Her breakthrough came after she joined the Beecham Opera Company in 1915. She had a broad repertoire but is most noted for her lead performances in Madama Butterfly and Tristan und Isolde. She toured widely and in 1922, Buckman, her tenor-husband Maurice d'Oisly, a pianist and a cellist embarked on a tour of New Zealand and Australia with 110 performances during a ten-month period. She continued performing into the 1920s, and recorded prolifically. From the 1930s, she concentrated on teaching.

== Early life ==
Buckman was born in 1881 in Blenheim Central, New Zealand, to John and Henrietta Buckman (née Chuck). She was the second of their eight children; she had five sisters and two brothers. Her mother was a singer and organist. Her father was a carpenter by trade. Her paternal grandfather, Samuel Buckman, had a fine singing voice. After her birth, her grandfather rode 50 miles (80 km) from his farm to Blenheim and requested that the baby girl be named Rosina, his sister, who also was a good singer. When she was just 18 months, her parents realised that she would become a singer as her "baby sounds were tuneful and sweet". Her mother taught her music from a young age. In 1885, the family moved to Petone. When Buckman was seven, the family moved to Waikanae where her father joined the flax trade. Aged nine, the children were playing on a bed and one of her sisters landed on top of her; the doctors predicted she would not survive the night. She spent eight months in Wellington Hospital and recovered after four operations. Next, the family moved to Foxton. A drop in the value of flax fibre caused a moved to Ōtaki and then Palmerston North, where Buckman attended Campbell Street School (which later became Central Normal School). In 1898, the family moved to Āpiti in the Manawatū where her father took up dairy farming. On the farm, Buckman would often go into the bush and imitate the birds' song. One day, a young man followed the singing and saw Buckman. Years later, by now a member of parliament, he went backstage after one of her London concerts and introduced himself.

Buckman took singing lessons in Palmerston North, 60 kilometres (37 mi) away from Āpiti. Her teacher was James Grace, who was the choirmaster for the St Paul's Methodist Church in Palmerston North. It was Grace who, realising Buckman's immense talent, persuaded her to move to England. Grace made the arrangements for Buckman to study in Birmingham under Charles Swinnerton Heap, and Grace and his wife accompanied her to England. The Graces were friends with Buckman's parents and they were travelling to England so that their two sons could receive training as piano tuners. Buckman did not have Heap long as her tutor as he died in June 1900; she moved to the school of music that belonged to the Birmingham and Midland Institute (Note: This is today part of the Birmingham School of Music.) and studied under George Breedon. A fellow student from the school of music described her as "pleasant, but not inclined to mix freely".

== Operatic career ==
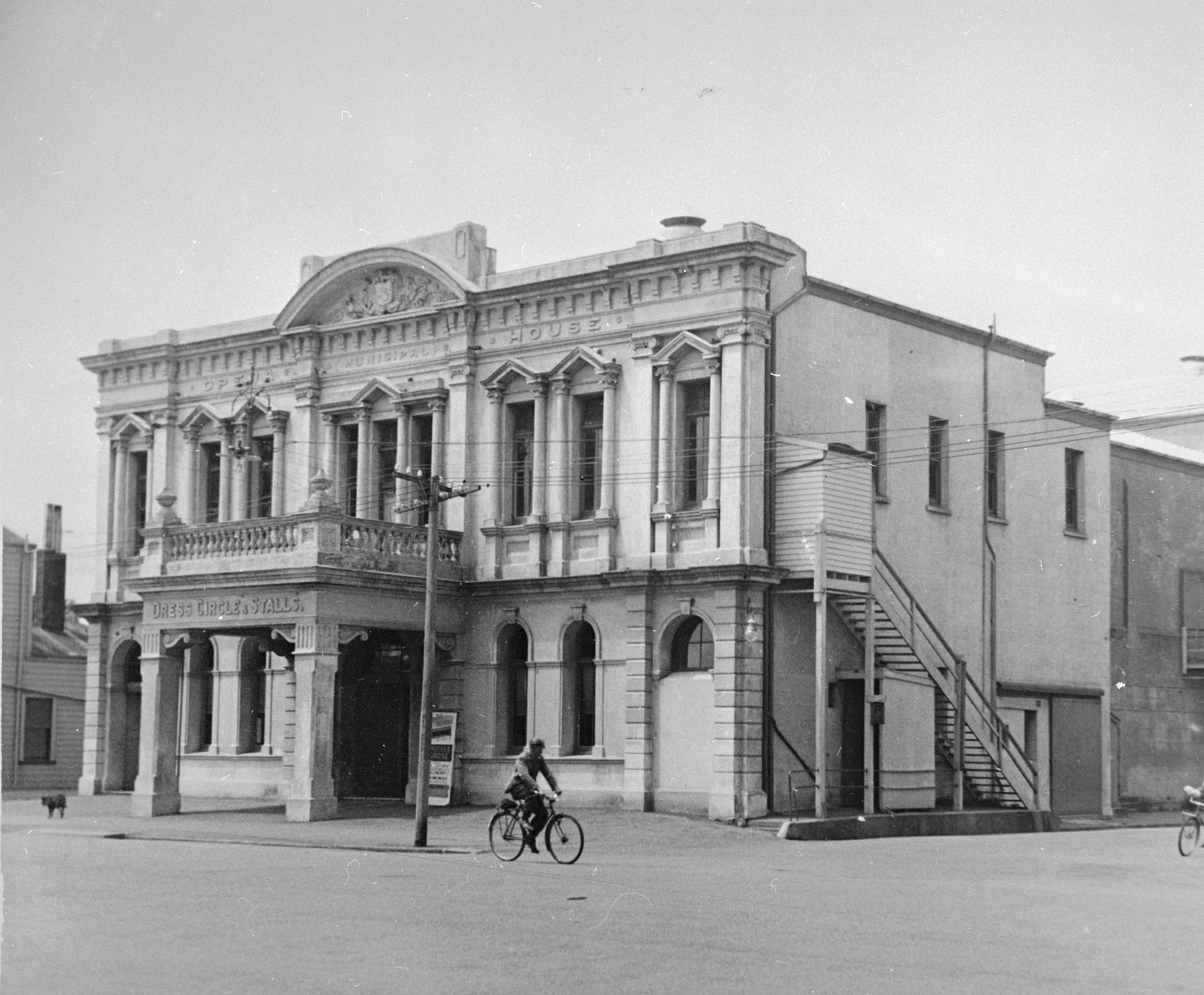
Buckman started her operatic career at the Palmerston North Opera House in 1905

Buckman graduated from the school of music in mid-1903 and could immediately support herself from roles in concerts. Her income ceased soon after when she fell ill and she accepted her parents' offer to pay for a fare to New Zealand. She took the SS Ortona from London (departed 29 January 1904) to Sydney. She arrived in New Zealand in early March 1904. By 28 March 1904, she gave her first concert in Auckland alongside the American baritone Hamilton Hodges; also involved was Clarice Buckman, her younger sister (then aged 12). (Note: Her sister would also become a professional singer. After her marriage, she was known as Mrs David Niven.) Subsequent concerts were in New Plymouth (30 March), Palmerston North (31 March), and Wellington (1 April). Buckman performed in her first opera on 20 September 1905 in Palmerston North (Note: The Dictionary of New Zealand Biographies incorrectly records that her first operatic performance was on 25 September 1905 in Wellington but the same cast gave two performances in Palmerston North in the previous week.) when she took the role of La Zara in Alfred Hill's A Moorish Maid, after the opera had previously performed a season in Auckland. Hill also wrote the popular Māori song "Waiata poi" and he is said to have written it for Buckman. Her reputation increased and in 1910, J. C. Williamson—the Australian impresario—included her in an opera company that was to tour both New Zealand and Australia. Buckman took the roles of Suzuki in Madama Butterfly, and initially Mercedes and later Micaela in Carmen. Within a year, her reputation resulted in an invitation from Nellie Melba to join her Melba Opera Company; Melba was at the time the most prominent Australian operatic soprano. Both Melba and her lead tenor, John McCormack, encouraged Buckman to continue her career in England based on the high quality of her singing. Buckman arrived in England during 1912.

In England, she soon obtained work and, among other roles, sang in a concert conducted by Thomas Beecham. After auditioning at the Royal Opera House in Covent Garden, she gained supporting roles in a series of Richard Wagner operas from early 1914. From spring 1914, she took the role of Musetta in La bohème, alongside Melba who sang as Mimi. Roles in three other operas followed before the Royal Opera House closed when World War I broke out. Beecham was also affected by the closure of the Royal Opera House as it was his primary venue for mounting operas. In 1915, he founded his own opera company—Beecham Opera Company—and picked those who in his opinion were the best British singers, but gave Buckman the role of a principal dramatic soprano. Working for the Beecham Opera Company, Buckman's career blossomed and she became a prima donna. She was versatile and performed the repertoire that was standard at the time. The lead roles in which she was regarded as most successful were as Madame Butterfly and as Isolde of Tristan und Isolde. On one occasion, she kept performing Isolde when an air raid was sounded. The theatre's manager eventually forced the performers off the stage; it added to Buckman's profile that she had kept going. During the war, she started recording and she produced an extensive catalogue covering arias, duets, ballads and concert songs. Some of her recordings are held by SOUNZ, the Centre for New Zealand Music Trust. A 1924 recording of Madama Butterfly was the first full recording of an opera in English. The Royal Opera House reopened in May 1919 and Buckman alternated with Melba performing as Mimì, the leading role in Giacomo Puccini's La bohème. Melba wrote about Buckman:

God has blessed her with a heavenly voice which with intelligence, experience and study has carried her through the bitter struggle of beginning to success and fame. New Zealand may well be proud of her Queen of Song.

On 24 December 1919 at St Mark's, Hamilton Terrace, London, Buckman married the leading tenor of the Beecham Opera Company, Maurice d'Oisly. It was not until the following February that this became known. They performed together and separately. The Beecham Opera Company was succeeded in December 1921 by the British National Opera Company and Buckman and d'Oisly sang regularly for them. In 1922, Buckman, d'Oisly, pianist Percy Kahn and cellist Adelina Leon travelled on the SS Ionic to an Australasian tour of 110 concerts. They attracted huge audiences and in New Zealand, Buckman's homecoming was celebrated. At the Wellington concerts, ticket queues formed from 7 am each morning. They arrived in Wellington on 15 May and on the following day, a civic reception was held for her at the Wellington Town Hall, presided by Robert Wright (mayor of Wellington). Speakers other than the mayor were the prime minister William Massey, former prime minister Joseph Ward, Thomas Forsyth (who spoke on behalf of Wellington City Council), and the musician Robert Parker. After a tour in New Zealand, they performed in Australia and then undertook another tour of New Zealand. They left Auckland on the RMS Niagara on 6 March 1923 for the United States.

Buckman reduced the number of her performances from here on. From the 1930s, she taught at the Royal Academy of Music where she was made a professor of singing in 1937.

In April 1940, Buckman made a brief return to the stage when she appeared in a matinée gala at His Majesty's Theatre in London, in aid of comforts for New Zealand troops in World War II. All the artists and authors involved in the performance, organised by actor Shayle Gardner, were born in New Zealand, and included David Low, Warwick Braithwaite, Hector Bolitho, Hugh Walpole, and Merton Hodge.

== Private life ==
Buckman and d'Oisly lived west of Cemaes in Wales. Their house was sold during World War II and taken over by the Royal Air Force; the area is now occupied by the Wylfa nuclear power station. She also owned a farm near Piopio in New Zealand, purchased during her 1922–23 tour, that was managed by one of her brothers. She told reporters about the rationale for buying the land: "Well, it was so that I could feel that although I have to live so far away, I actually do own a bit of New Zealand! I may do some stock-raising there later on – I don't know; the main thing is that I now have a real 'stake' in my own country." She never returned to New Zealand, though.

Because of her childhood injuries, the marriage remained childless. After a serious illness, she died on 31 December 1948 (Note: Note that contemporary sources mostly recorded 30 December but later sources, including the 1951 edition of Who's Who in New Zealand, state 31 December.) at Battersea General Hospital in London, and her funeral took place at St Marylebone Parish Church on 5 January 1949. Her husband survived her only by a few months; he died on 12 July 1949 aged 67.
