= Suzanne Adams (soprano) =

U.S. lyric soprano

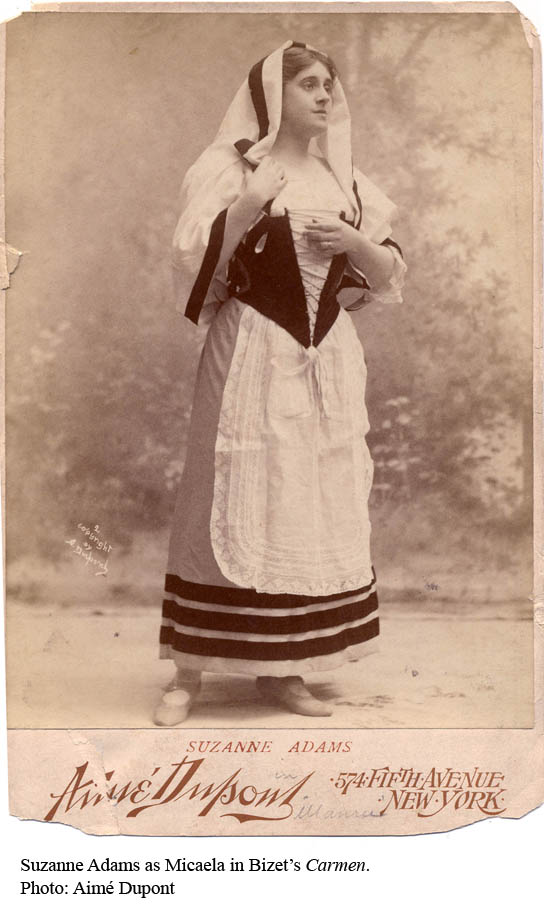
- Suzanne Adams as Micaela in Carmen at the Metropolitan Opera in 1899
- Born: November 28, 1872; Cambridge, Massachusetts
- Died: February 5, 1953 (aged 80); London, England

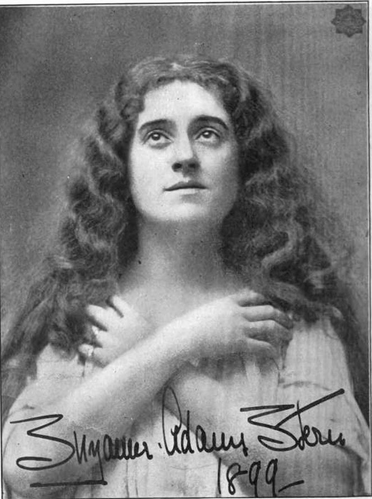
Suzanne Adams Stern, from a 1900 publication.

Suzanne Adams (28 November 1872 – 5 February 1953) was an American lyric coloratura soprano. Known for her agile and pure voice, Adams first became well known in France before establishing herself as one of the Metropolitan Opera's leading sopranos at the beginning of the twentieth century.

== Biography ==
Adams was born in Cambridge, Massachusetts on November 28, 1872, the daughter of John Gedney Adams.

She studied in Manhattan, New York City with Jacques Bouhy and then in Paris with Mathilde Marchesi. She made her début at the Paris Opéra in 1894 or 1895 in Charles Gounod's Roméo et Juliette. She studied the roles of Juliette and Marguerite from Faust with Gounod himself, who greatly admired her fine technique, brilliant tone, and vocal flexibility.

Adams remained at the Paris Opera for three years and then went to Nice. While in France, she sang numerous roles by Gounod and Meyerbeer, as well as the Queen of the Night in Mozart's The Magic Flute and the title role in Gluck's Orfeo ed Euridice. During the summer of 1898, she appeared at Covent Garden in London as Hero in the world premiere of C. V. Stanford's Much Ado About Nothing. In the autumn of 1898, Adams joined the Metropolitan Opera in New York City, where she sang numerous roles until 1903. Her roles at the Met included Juliette, Marguerite, Marguerite de Valois in Les Huguenots, Micaela in Carmen, Cherubino in Le nozze di Figaro, Donna Elvira in Don Giovanni, Philine in Mignon, Berthe in Le prophète, the Forest Bird in Siegfried, Nedda in Pagliacci, Gilda in Rigoletto, Infanta in Le Cid, Inès in L'Africaine, and Mimì in La bohème, among others.

In October, 1898, Adams married Leo Stern, a British cellist, who died in 1904, so she lived abroad most of the time. Following Stern's death, Adams soon retired from the stage and settled in London. She appeared at Covent Garden in a few performances of Carmen in November 1906 (presumably as Micaela), these may have been among her last appearances in opera.

She sang at Covent Garden, London, England, in 1898 and 1901, and appeared in a few concerts in the United Kingdom in 1905 and 1906. She visited the United States in late 1907 to appear in vaudeville in Chicago, New York and elsewhere.

In 1915 she married John Lumsden Mackay, a man of 'independent means'. Few details of John Mackay, are known, but he may have had a career as an actor before World War I (sources: NY passenger list of 1912; 'Garrick Club' as address in World War I medal index). He served in World War I, possibly as a sick bay attendant in the US Navy. Mackay died in November 1934. They lived for many years north of Hyde Park in London at 55 Inverness Terrace.

Adams may have continued teaching until her death in London on 5 February 1953.

== Recordings ==
Adams recorded five cylinder records for Gianni Bettini in 1898. In 1902 she made five disc recordings in London for the Gramophone and Typewriter Company's new Red label series, four of which were issued in the United States by the Victor Talking Machine Company on their Red Seal label the following year. In 1903, Adams made seven more records in the United States for Columbia Records' Grand Opera Series. She also appears on a few of the Mapleson Cylinders recorded live on stage at the Metropolitan Opera, including "A ce mot tout s'anime" from Les Huguenots (this record has been erroneously attributed to Nellie Melba).

== Sources ==
- Bolig, John (2004). The Victor Red Seal Discography. Vol. 1. Denver, Colorado: Mainspring Press. p. 2. ISBN 0-9671819-8-4.
- Gilman, D. C.; Peck, H. T.; Colby, F. M., eds. (1905). "Adams, Suzanne" . New International Encyclopedia (1st ed.). New York: Dodd, Mead.
- Hoffmann, Frank; Ferstler, Howard (2005). Encyclopedia of Recorded Sound. Vol. 1. CRC Press. p. 12. ISBN 0-415-93835-X.
- Johnson, Rossiter, ed. (1906). "Adams, Suzanne". The Biographical Dictionary of America. Vol. 1. Boston: American Biographical Society. p. 56.
- Leonard, John William; Marquis, Albert Nelson, eds. (1908). Who's who in America. Vol. 5. Chicago: Marquis Who's Who, Incorporated. p. 11.
