= David Ffrangcon-Davies =

Welsh operatic baritone (1855 - 1918)

David Ffrangcon-Davies (11 December 1855 – 13 April 1918) was a Welsh operatic baritone.

== Early life and education ==
David Thomas Davies was born in Bethesda, Gwynedd. He later adopted the name Ffrangcon, an early variant spelling of the nearby valley Nant Ffrancon, as part of his new surname (Ffrangcon-Davies). He attended Friars School, Bangor and Jesus College, Oxford, matriculating in 1876 and graduating with a BA in 1881. His time at Oxford was not without its difficulties, however. During his first two years, his "battels" were "more than once" the highest in the college and he was warned in 1878 that if he was "idle or irregular" in the following term or if he failed to pass his examinations that term, he would lose his exhibition.

In June 1880, it was recorded that he had failed his Schools (final examinations) for the second time, a summons had been taken out against him for 'furious driving' and a judgment for debt had been entered against him in the Chancellor's Court. He was allowed one final chance to pass his exams, provided that he did not return to college until the time for the exam; he passed.

He was ordained a clergyman and was appointed curate at Llanaelhaearn in 1884 and then at Conwy in 1885. While at Conwy he studied the organ with Roland Rogers. He was unable to secure the post of minor canon at Bangor cathedral, and so he decided to concentrate on a singing career. He became a curate at St. Mary's, Hoxton, London, where he was permitted to pursue his music studies.

== Musical career ==
Ffrangcon-Davies' musical interest had begun at an early age under his father's guidance. While at St. Mary's, he studied under the tenor (not the bard) William Shakespeare.

In 1888, he began to sing professionally in concerts in Cardiff. He soon joined the Carl Rosa Opera Company and made his operatic debut in the part of the herald in Wagner's Lohengrin. His greatest success was in the title role of Felix Mendelssohn's Elijah, which he sang for the first time in 1890 at the Horringham, Yorkshire, music festival.

In the late 1890s, Davies toured the U.S. and Germany with pianist Stanley Hawley. He then moved to Berlin to sing and teach singing. In 1901 he again visited the U.S. to sing and lecture. In June 1903 he sang in London's Richard Strauss festival under the composer's baton. In 1904 he was appointed professor of singing at the Royal Academy of Music in Britain and published a book on vocal training, The Singing of the Future, in 1905.

== Family ==
In 1889, he married Annie Francis Rayner. His daughter was actress Dame Gwen Ffrangcon-Davies (1891–1992), whose career spanned more than seven decades.

== Books ==
- Books by David Ffrangcon-Davies (at the Internet Archive)
