= British National Opera Company =

The British National Opera Company presented opera in English in London and on tour in the British provinces between 1922 and 1929. It was founded in December 1921 by singers and instrumentalists from Sir Thomas Beecham's Beecham Opera Company (1915–1920), which was disbanded when financial problems over buying The Bedford Estate forced Beecham to withdraw from the music scene for a short period. The new venture was financed by the issue of 40,000 preference shares at £1 each. Among the musicians who met at the inaugural meeting of the new enterprise at the Queen's Hall were Sir Alexander Mackenzie, Sir Charles Stanford, Harry Plunket Greene, Walter Hyde, Aylmer Buesst and Sir Henry Hadow. The new company bought the entire assets of the Beecham company, comprising the scenery, costumes, scores, instruments and performing rights for 48 operas.

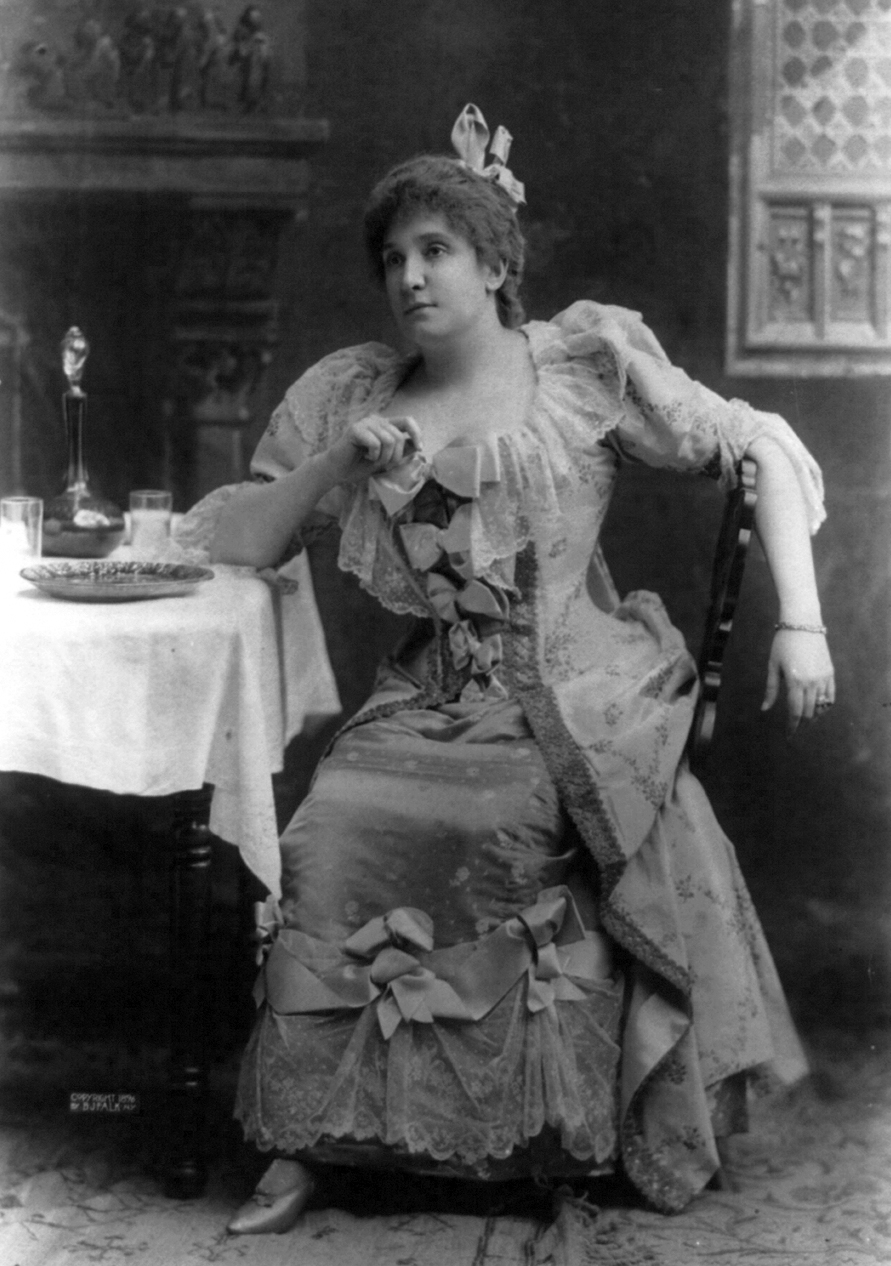
Nellie Melba, who appeared with the company at Covent Garden

The company's first performance was Aida at Bradford in February 1922, and received excellent notices. For much of its existence the company toured in the provinces, but also had short seasons at Covent Garden (1922–1924) and then at His Majesty's Theatre. For the 1923 Covent Garden season Dame Nellie Melba emerged from retirement to sing with the company. She gave her services free of charge, to support the company. She did not, however, feel equal to relearning her old roles in English translation, and she sang in Italian while the rest of the company sang in the vernacular.

The British National Opera Company was a pioneer of broadcast opera, with excerpts from The Magic Flute broadcast live from the Royal Opera House by the British Broadcasting Company in January 1923, less than a year after the foundation of both the BBC and the opera company.

The company's first artistic director was Percy Pitt, who had been music director with the Grand Opera Syndicate and who later worked as Director of Music for the BBC. His successor in 1924 was baritone Frederic Austin, who in 1920 arranged the music for a revival of The Beggar's Opera at the Lyric Theatre (Hammersmith). The company had a wide repertory, which included works by Wagner, Debussy, Italian opera and several English works, including Vaughan Williams's Hugh the Drover and Gustav Holst's The Perfect Fool and At the Boar's Head. The New Grove Dictionary of Opera singled out the company's staging of the Ring, Tristan und Isolde, Parsifal and "a notable production in English of Pelléas and Mélisande with Maggie Teyte."

British National Opera Company employed most of the leading British and British-based singers and conductors of that time, including conductors John Barbirolli, Adrian Boult, Aylmer Buesst, Hamilton Harty, Leslie Heward, Gervase Hughes and Malcolm Sargent, and singers Agnes Nicholls, Florence Austral, Joseph Hislop, Edward Johnson, Dinh Gilly, Walter Hyde, Harold Williams, Norman Allin, Robert Radford, Dora Labbette, Walter Widdop, Frank Mullings, Herbert Heyner and Heddle Nash, among others. Casts and dates for 327 BNOC performances in Scotland are available. <In 1924, Beecham joined the company at His Majesty's for Die Meistersinger von Nürnberg.

The company was short of money throughout its existence, and the resumption of international opera seasons at Covent Garden deprived the BNOC of its lucrative London seasons which had in the first years subsidised its provincial tours. The company ceased to exist in 1929 following a tax demand for £17,000 which forced it to go into voluntary liquidation. Its last performances were Cavalleria rusticana and Pagliacci at the Golders Green Hippodrome in London, on 16 April 1929, in a season in which the conductors included Beecham, Barbirolli and Eugène Goossens. The company effectively re-formed as the Covent Garden English Opera Company in September 1929, with Barbirolli as its musical director, and continued under that name until 1938.
