= Agnes Nicholls =

English soprano (1876 – 1959)

Agnes Helen Nicholls CBE (14 July 1876 – 21 September 1959) was one of the greatest English sopranos of the 20th century, both in the concert hall and on the operatic stage.

== Biography ==
Born in Cheltenham, Nicholls was the daughter of a director of Cavendish House, a prestigious store in the town. She received her early education at Bedford High School where she started singing lessons with Dr H. Alfred Harding. In 1894, she won a scholarship to the Royal College of Music where her teacher was Albert Visetti. Lodging with Visetti and his wife, she began a passionate affair with Visetti's stepdaughter, (Marguerite) Radclyffe Hall, later famed for authoring the groundbreaking The Well of Loneliness. The relationship, Hall's first, was volatile, provoked family argument, and soon ran its course. Hall nonetheless drew on Nicholls and their relationship as the basis for the characters Harriet Nelson and Rosie Wilmot in her novel The Unlit Lamp.

During her student years Nicholls took the part of Dido in Purcell's Dido and Aeneas, and sang three times in front of Queen Victoria at private functions. Nicholls' voice matured into an impressive, dramatic-sized instrument. Her operatic roles ranged from major Wagner and Mozart parts through to the Dewman in Humperdinck's Hänsel und Gretel.

Among her celebrated Wagnerian assumptions were Venus in Tannhäuser, Sieglinde in Die Walküre, Brünnhilde in Siegfried. In 1908, she participated in a notable production of Wagner's Ring Cycle, led by the eminent Hans Richter.

Nicholls sang with the Quinlan Opera Company during its 1912 tour of Australia. She was a frequent performer at the Royal Opera House, Covent Garden until 1924, and was a principal of the British National Opera Company, appearing under the baton of Sir Thomas Beecham and other leading conductors of the day. In 1904, she married the conductor-composer, Hamilton Harty, who was to become famous as the director of the Hallé Orchestra. She was appointed a Commander of the Order of the British Empire (CBE) in the 1923 Birthday Honours, recognising her as a leading soprano in both oratorio and opera. Harty was knighted in 1925 and Nicholls was styled subsequently as Lady Harty. He had frequently accompanied her on piano at song recitals, but his health deteriorated in the 1930s, and he and his wife became estranged. Harty died in 1941.

As well as being a conductor, Harty was a composer, and Nicholls was the debut soloist in one of his compositions, Ode to a Nightingale, which was heard at the 1907 Cardiff Festival. This work was repeated the same year at The Proms in London's Albert Hall. As well as performing in opera and delivering songs, Nicholls sang in many oratorios, including Parry's Judith and Bach's St Matthew Passion. Sir Henry Wood, the conductor and impresario, described her as "a great artist with a beautiful voice (which) seemed to have been made for Bach's arias".

== Death and legacy ==
Nicholls died in London, aged 82, but her pure, strong, well-trained and steady voice can still be heard on a handful of gramophone recordings of songs and arias which she made between circa 1909 and circa 1921. These have been remastered and reissued on CD in recent years (most comprehensively by Truesound Transfers, catalogue number TT-3041). Unfortunately, none of her Bach, Mozart or Wagner interpretations figure in her short discography. The pre-1925 acoustic recording process found it difficult to capture powerful voices such as the one possessed by Nicholls and, according to discographers, she refused to approve most of her discs for public release because of their inadequate sound.
