= Ben Davies (tenor) =

Welsh tenor singer

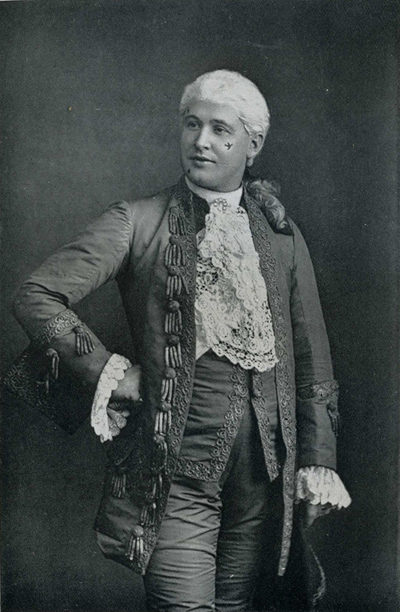
Ben Davies as Geoffrey Wilder in Alfred Cellier's Dorothy, circa 1887. Photo by Walery Studios, London.

Ben Davies (6 January 1858 – 28 March 1943) was a Welsh tenor singer, who appeared in opera with the Carl Rosa Opera Company, in operetta and light opera, and on the concert and oratorio platform. He was spoken of as a successor of Edward Lloyd, as a leading British tenor, and retained something of his style and repertoire in concert performance. He died on 29 March 1943 at his home at Ashwick, near Bath, and was eulogized as "'The last of the white-gloved tenors', and "one of the most versatile soloists of his day." His obituary noted that "He had the unusual experience of singing in Westminster Abbey at three coronations, those of Edward VII, Geroge V and the present king [George V]"

== Training and operatic career, 1881–1891 ==
Ben Davies was born in Pontardawe in Wales. He studied at the Royal Academy of Music in London under Alberto Randegger and Signor Fiori. He made his debut in 1881 in Michael Balfe's The Bohemian Girl, and in the following ten years devoted himself principally to the operatic stage. In 1883 he created the role of Gringoire in Arthur Thomas's Esmeralda, in the first Carl Rosa season at Drury Lane Theatre: his future wife Clara Perry was in the cast as Fleur-de-lys. In that time he began to assume the mantle of Edward Lloyd, as the leading British operatic tenor.

In 1887 he played Geoffrey Wilder in Alfred Cellier's Dorothy, one of his most successful roles, in the re-casting opposite Marie Tempest ('Mr Davies also has a capital song, A Guinea here, a guinea there, which he sang with his eyes shut, but otherwise admirably.'); in 1889 he took the lead in the sequel, Doris, and later that year he starred as Ralph Rodney in The Red Hussar. He was chosen by Sir Arthur Sullivan to create the title role in the opera Ivanhoe in January 1891, at the opening of the Royal English Opera House (Palace Theatre) – Shaw called him 'a robust and eupeptic Ivanhoe', who 'gets beaten because he is obviously some three stone over his proper fighting weight': and 'his obstreperous self-satisfaction put everybody into good humour.'

In November 1891 he created the tenor lead in the London production of André Messager's La Basoche (also at the Royal English Opera House), in which the baritone David Bispham made his stage debut, as Duc de Longueville. Shaw remarked,

Mr Ben Davies conquers, not without evidence of an occasional internal struggle, his propensity to bounce out of the stage picture and deliver his high notes over the footlights in the attitude of irrepressible appeal first discovered by the inventor of Jack-in-the-box. Being still sufficiently hearty, good-humoured, and well-filled to totally dispel all the mists of imagination which arise from his medieval surroundings, he is emphatically himself, and not Clement Marot; but except in so far as his opportunities are spoiled in the concerted music by the fact that his part is a baritone part, and not a tenor one, he sings satisfactorily, and succeeds in persuading the audience that the Basoche king very likely was much the same pleasant sort of fellow as Ben Davies.

In 1892 Davies made his Covent Garden debut in Gounod's Faust. (His 'Salve, dimora casta e pura' from that opera was recorded.) In 1893 he appeared in Frederick Cowen's Signa there, sung in Italian, with Mme de Nuovina and the baritone Mario Ancona, under Cowen's baton. 'Mr Ben Davies made almost the only hit of the opera by his singing of a song in the first act, which was the most effective number in the work as it stood; but his success would have been greater if a somewhat smarter physical training had made him less obviously a popular and liberally fed London concert singer.'

== Concert recital ==
Bernard Shaw was thoroughly impressed by Ben Davies in a performance of Mendelssohn's Elijah under Joseph Barnby at the Albert Hall in May 1892. In June 1893, sharing that platform with Adelina Patti and Charles Santley, he was distinguished in Handel's Deeper and deeper still – Waft her, angels (Jephtha), and in a monster performance of Sullivan's The Golden Legend at the Crystal Palace, with Mme Albani, George Henschel and others.

After 1893, in which year he also appeared with Edward Lloyd at the Norwich Festival, Davies's career moved largely to the concert platform. In that year he performed at the Chicago World's Fair. In the voyage concert of the Atlantic crossing his piano accompanist was a 14-year-old passenger, Thomas Beecham, travelling with his father, who later wrote: 'His was a voice of uncommon beauty, round, full, and expressive, less inherently tenor than baritone, and, like all organs of this mixed genre, thinning out perceptibly on top. Later on, the upper notes disappeared entirely, but the middle register preserved to the end... most of its former opulence and charm.' Davies soon became very popular in the United States, where he toured regularly.

In 1894 he was a soloist at the London Handel Festival alongside Mme Albani, Mme Melba, Edward Lloyd and Charles Santley: 'Mr Ben Davies, when remorselessly compelled in Waft her, angels, to walk his voice slowly up from A to A so deliberately as to allow every step to be scrutinised, had to confess to a marked "break" on F sharp, or thereabouts.' In July 1896 he took part in the first performance of Liza Lehmann's In a Persian Garden, with Mme Albani, Hilda Wilson and David Bispham, the composer accompanying. In the second series of Promenade Concerts, 1896, he made an appearance in a concert of nationalist flavour with the soprano Fanny Moody and organist Walter Hedgecock, and a choir of 400 boys. In 1897, at the sixth concert of the Royal Philharmonic Society (dedicated to 'Her Majesty's Record Reign'), he sang Frederick Cowen's Scena The Dream of Endymion under the composer's baton. He was with David Bispham at the thirteenth biennial Festival at Cincinnati (under Theodore Thomas), in 1898.

A grand occasion of 1902 was the British and American Festival Peace Concert at The Crystal Palace, London, in commemoration of the South African War, at which Ben Davies was among the British soloists led by Mme Albani, including Clara Butt and Charles Santley, and (for America) Bispham, Ella Russell and Belle Cole. He and Ella Russell, with Ada Crossley and David Ffrangcon-Davies, that year opened the Sheffield Festival (under Henry J. Wood) with a performance of Mendelssohn's Elijah.

Nearly a decade later, he was among the soloists (with Agnes Nicholls, Ellen Beck, Edna Thornton, Thorpe Davies and Robert Radford) in J. S. Bach's Mass in B minor at the Queen's Hall, in the penultimate concert of the 1911 London Music Festival. That year he also toured Australia, his accompanist being Edward Goll, who married and settled in Melbourne and became a noted piano teacher there. In May 1912 he was, with Cicely Gleeson-White, Ada Crossley and Herbert Brown, in the soloist group with the London Choral Society to sing Beethoven's Choral Symphony for the Royal Philharmonic under the baton of Arthur Nikisch. In 1916 he sang an aria from Der Freischütz under Beecham for the Royal Philharmonic, and he sang in the July 1922 Centenary celebration concerts for the Royal Academy of Music – again in the Queen's Hall.

== Recordings ==
The earliest recordings by Davies are Pathé brown wax cylinders from the mid-1890s . Davies had an early start among British singers in making gramophone records, beginning in 1901. Joe Batten noted:

Sir Landon Ronald persuaded [him] to make his first records. He had laughed at the idea of singing into a tin trumpet, but when the test record of Henry Bishop's My Pretty Jane was played back to him, he was inexpressibly delighted.

The 1901 session (Gramophone and Typewriter Company 2-2500/2-2504 Black 'Concert' label) resulted in five titles, including also Schubert's Serenade (Leise flehen), Frederic Clay's I'll sing thee songs of Araby, Michael Balfe's When other lips and Charles Dibdin's Tom Bowling.

In June 1903 he headed-up the first 12" male solo catalogue list (Black Label 'Monarch') with record 02000 (Charles Dibdin's Tom Bowling), with 02003 (I'll sing thee songs of Araby) and 02004 (Gounod, Salve dimora) closely following. At the same time he made five more 10" records (2-2778/2-2783), Maude Valérie White's To Mary, Blumenthal's An Evening Song, Yes! Let me like a soldier fall from Maritana, So fare thee well from Cellier's Doris and Sullivan's The sailor's grave. He returned to the Gramophone Company (His Master's Voice) in 1913–1914 to make 12" records of I'll sing thee songs of Araby (02477), Come into the garden, Maud (02482), To Mary (02514), Tosti's My Dreams and Adams's The Star of Bethlehem (02498). (The last two titles were later coupled on His Master's Voice D100). The earlier duplications were to make longer versions on 12" discs and the later ones to replace the earlier as the recording quality improved: by November 1914 all but the final four discs had been deleted from the catalogue.

On three two-sided 10" acoustic His Master's Voice records he later recorded Purcell's 'I attempt from love's sickness to fly, and Schumann's 'Frühlingsnacht' (in English) (E313); Brahms's Die Mainacht and Feldeinsamkeit (also in English) (E349); and two of the 'Elizabethan love songs' arranged by Keel, Go to bed, sweet muse, and When Laura smiles (E364).

For Pathé Records ('hill-and-dale' recordings, like Edison Disc Records) he sang duets with Louise Kirkby Lunn, including Verdi's 'Ai nostri monti' (Il trovatore) and The sailor sighs by Dibdin. Among his acoustic Columbia Records are Tom Bowling, Come into the garden, Maud, I know of two bright eyes, and I'll sing thee songs of Araby. In 1932 he was persuaded by Joe Batten (a Brother Savage) to re-make a small group of his best-known earlier recordings (six) by the electric process, including To Mary, I'll Sing Thee Songs of Araby, I Know of Two Bright Eyes and Come into The Garden, Maud.

In later years he took singing pupils, and played golf a good deal. He was a member of the Savage Club in London.
