= Robert Radford =

British bass singer (1874–1933)

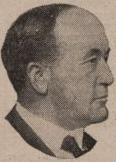
- Robert Radford, circa 1925
- Born: 13 May 1874
- Died: 3 March 1933

Robert Radford (13 May 1874 – 3 March 1933) was a British bass singer who made his career entirely in the United Kingdom, participating in concerts and becoming one of the foremost performers of oratorios and other sacred music. He had equally great success in a broad spectrum of operatic roles, ranging from Wagner to Gilbert and Sullivan, due to the strength and burnished beauty of his well-trained voice.

== Early career ==
Even as a young man, Radford possessed a deep and resonant voice. He studied at the Royal Academy of Music in London, mainly under the conductor Alberto Randegger, but also received lessons from Battison Haynes and Frederic King. He had natural dramatic gifts which from the outset suggested an operatic career, but his early professional life was devoted particularly to oratorio and the concert platform.

== Concert and oratorio, 1899–1915 ==
His debut was at the Norwich Music Festival in 1899. He appeared for Henry J. Wood at a Queen's Hall prom on 9 February 1900 in Arthur Sullivan's The Martyr of Antioch. He was also a soloist at Wood's Trafalgar Day Centenary Concert of 21 October 1905 (at which Wood's Fantasia on British Sea-Songs was first performed). In 1906 he became the principal bass soloist in the Handel Festival concerts at the Crystal Palace, and remained so until the 1920s.

On 26 May 1911, he took part in the Sheffield Festival Chorus performance of J. S. Bach's Mass in B minor for the London Music Festival, with Agnes Nicholls, Edna Thornton, Ben Davies and others; on the following day he was with Gervase Elwes and others in the big Leeds Choral Union performance of the St Matthew Passion. He was also in the Leeds Chorus performance of the Mass in B minor, with Carrie Tubb, John Coates and others, in the 'Three B's' Festival' of April 1915, again at Queen's Hall, under Henri Verbrugghen with the London Symphony Orchestra.

== Operatic career before 1914 ==
As early as November 1900, Henry Wood had engaged Radford for his uncut performance at Nottingham of the first two acts of Tannhäuser (introducing the Paris version of the Venusberg scene for the first time in England), along with Robert Watkin-Mills and others. In 1904 he made his first appearance at Covent Garden, as the Commendatore in Don Giovanni under Hans Richter. He was again engaged for Richter's Ring cycle in 1908, taking the roles of Fasolt in Das Rheingold, Hunding in Die Walküre, and (according to another source) Hagen in Götterdämmerung. In 1910 he joined the Denhof Opera Company.

He was then engaged with the Grand Opera Syndicate at the Royal Opera House, Covent Garden, and he was successively engaged by Thomas Beecham in his productions at various venues, including Covent Garden, Drury Lane and His Majesty's Theatre. In Beecham's production of Wagner's Ring cycle he again played Fasolt, opposite the Fafnir of the younger Norman Allin, who succeeded him as Britain's foremost bass. Among his best-known roles were Mephistopheles (Gounod's Faust), Osmin (Il Seraglio), Sarastro (The Magic Flute), the Father (Charpentier's Louise), Ivan the Terrible and Boris Godunov (title role), which he was the first to sing in English. In April 1914 he was in the first English-language performance of Wagner's Parsifal with English soloists (with the London Choral Society, Carrie Tubb, John Coates, Thorpe Bates and Dawson Freer).

== First recordings, 1903–1914 ==
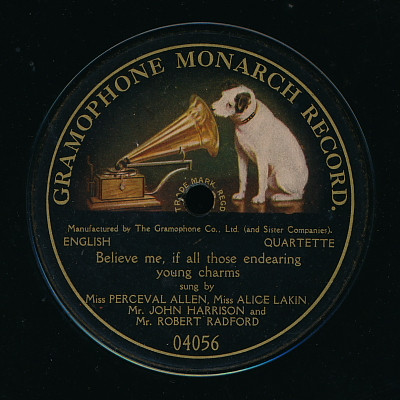
Maud Perceval Allen et al 1909

Radford had an early and successful relationship with the gramophone, beginning with a song called 'Ho! ho! hear the wild winds blow' for the Gramophone Company in June 1903. His first 12" records were 'It is enough' and 'Lord God of Abraham' from Mendelssohn's Elijah in 1906-7 (supplementing 'For the mountains shall depart', and 'Is not his word like a fire' on 10" records): over the next few years he added 'I am a Roamer' (Mendelssohn), 'Nazareth', 'Vulcan's Song' (Philemon and Baucis), and 'She alone charmeth my sadness' (Gounod), 'O ruddier than the cherry' (Acis and Galatea), 'Hear, ye winds and waves' (Scipio), 'Honour and Arms', 'Arm, arm ye brave' (Judas Maccabaeus) (Handel), 'Arise ye subterranean winds' (Purcell), and many of the better and longer ballads of the time. He recorded the standard bass and tenor duets ('Larboard Watch', 'The Gendarmes', 'Excelsior', 'The moon hath raised her lamp above', and 'Watchman, what of the night'?) with John Harrison, and also recorded English songs in quartette arrangements (e.g., Pearsall's 'O, who will o'er the downs so free?') with John Harrison, Maud Perceval Allen or Alice Lakin, and Edna Thornton.

== After the First World War ==
Oh, better far to live and die
"Oh, better far to live and die" from The Pirates of Penzance, recorded 1920, with Radford singing the role of the Pirate King

Radford continued to record from time to time during the Great War, and was a valuable asset to the promenade concerts in that period. In 1917, he joined with the company of George W. Byng of the Alhambra Theatre in the first major project to record Gilbert and Sullivan operettas, together with the singers Nellie Walker, George Baker, Ernest Pike, Derek Oldham, Peter Dawson and others. Besides these, he recorded several new titles from his own repertoire in 1918–20. On 26 March 1919 he appeared at a Royal Philharmonic Society Concert singing 'Wotan's Farewell' (Die Walküre Act 3) under Landon Ronald. He appeared in The Dream of Gerontius with the Northampton Musical Society under Charles King on 29 October 1920, with Norah Dawnay and Gervase Elwes: this was to be the last occasion on which Elwes sang the work. The artists (together with W.H. Reed and others) stayed at the Elwes home at Little Billing for the occasion.

In 1920–22, he became a founder Director of the British National Opera Company, and also became an important member of its singing company. He sang in two Philharmonic Society performances of Beethoven's 9th Symphony, first under Felix Weingartner in March 1924 with Florence Austral, Margaret Balfour and Frank Titterton, and again in October 1925 with Dorothy Silk, Muriel Brunskill and Walter Widdop, under Albert Coates. He continued to make recordings for His Master's Voice after the advent of the electric microphone in 1925. In late acoustic and early electric sets of Wagnerian passages, he is heard at some length (often opposite the great soprano Florence Austral), as Alberich in Das Rheingold, Wotan in Die Walküre, and Hagen in Götterdämmerung, as Gurnemanz in Parsifal (His Master's Voice D 1025–29) and as both Hans Sachs and Pogner in Die Meistersinger, all under the baton of Albert Coates: the recorded sound is mostly disappointing. In 1924 it was stated that in oratorio his voice was best suited to bass parts in The Creation (Haydn) and in the Handel oratorios.

Radford is said to have suffered from ill-health all his life, and it was this handicap which prevented him from developing his career on the international scene. A photograph of him (but no account of his career) is shown by Michael Scott in his important survey The Record of Singing. He is the subject, too, of a brief story in Peter Dawson's autobiography.
