= Sydney Baynes =

Sydney Baynes (2 January 1879 – 9 March 1938) was an English conductor, composer and leader of one of the United Kingdom's most popular radio bands. Born in Sudbury, Middlesex (nr. Wembley), he was educated at Hawley Crescent Primary School and Haverstock Hill School in Camden, Middlesex. He gained his first employment as an organist in London and was later the piano accompanist for singers such as Edward Lloyd and Ben Davies. Through this work he became a respected conductor for London theatres including the Adelphi and Drury Lane. He worked for the BBC for many years and formed and conducted his own orchestra between 1928 and 1938 which broadcast and recorded regularly. He died on 9 March 1938 at Willesden General Hospital, Willesden, London. whilst residing at 14 The Avenue, Wembley.

== Works ==
His original compositions are largely in the light music genre. His most famous piece of work was the Destiny Waltz published in 1912, which sold over a million copies. In an episode of ITV's Jeeves and Wooster (1993), based on the stories of P. G. Wodehouse, it was performed at the Totleigh-in-the-Wold village concert. Destiny was one of a series of generic waltzes based on one-word abstract nouns, such as "Ecstasy", "Frivolry", "Loyalty", "Mystery", "Victory" and "Witchery". His march "Off We Go" was used as the Radio Variety march. Other compositions included a Miniature Ballet Suite, the overture Endure to Conquer, first played at an Armistice Thanksgiving in Westminster Abbey.

His oeuvre also included a number of parlour songs, such as "First Love" and the "Garden of My Love", numerous piano solos and some church music. However, it was as an arranger that Baynes made his mark, including Fifty Years of Song, The Gay Nineties, Tipperaryland and the dances from Sheridan's The Duenna.
