= Frederic King =

British concert singer (1853–1933

Frederic King (3 January 1853 – 20 May 1933) was an English baritone and voice teacher. A singer who specialized in the concert repertoire, he was particularly celebrated as an interpreter of the title role of Felix Mendelssohn's Elijah and the role of Mephistopheles in Berlioz's La damnation de Faust, the latter of which he performed for the work's English premiere at Royal Albert Hall in 1882. He is also remembered for performing works composed by Arthur Sullivan for the Leeds Festivals of 1880 and 1886.

After retiring from performance in 1890, he had a highly regarded career as a teacher of singing at the Royal College of Music for 42 years.

== Early life and concert career ==
Born in Lichfield, the son of Thomas and Mary King, Frederic King was baptised on 13 January 1853 at St Michael on Greenhill in Lichfield. He worked in an auction house before beginning his singing career. He was trained as a vocalist at the National Training School for Music (NTSM) in the 1870s; a precursor to the Royal College of Music. He studied singing with Albert Visetti at the NTSM, and his other teachers at that school included Ebenezer Prout (harmony), William Henry Monk (choral music), Eaton Faning (piano), and Stephen Kemp (piano).

While obituaries stated that he made his professional singing debut in a ballad concert at St James's Hall in 1878, King had appeared earlier as a featured baritone soloist at the Prince of Wales Theatre in a professional production of William Shakespeare's The Merchant of Venice in 1876, and that same year had performed professionally as a baritone in concerts in the Assembly Room of the Royal Hotel, Birmingham. Shortly after joining the roster of singers managed by Messrs Harrison, he appeared in concert at the Birmingham Triennial Music Festival in February 1879; and it was reported in the press that this was his professional debut. His performance at the festival included a duet from La favorite sung with Zelia Trebelli-Bettini. Later that year he was the bass soloist in the premiere of Prout's cantata Hereward at St James's Hall on 4 June 1879.

King created the role of Callias, the Priest of Apollo, in the first performance of Arthur Sullivan's oratorio The Martyr of Antioch at the triennial Leeds Festivals in 1880. At that same festival he replaced an ailing Charles Santley in the title role of Felix Mendelssohn's Elijah and in performances of Joseph Haydn's The Creation, the latter of which included soprano Emma Albani and tenor Edward Lloyd. He returned to the Leeds Festival for performances in 1883 and 1886. At the 1886 festival, he sang the role of Lucifer in the first performance of Sullivan's cantata The Golden Legend (1886). Reviewing King's performance in the latter work, Herman Klein, in Musical Notes, called him:

...a talented and conscientious artist, who invested his music with all the dramatic significance and sardonic humour of which it was susceptible. Truth to tell, there is not much diabolical in Longfellow's fiend, and it would seem as though Sir Arthur Sullivan had sought on occasion to atone for his comparative mildness by applying a background of orchestration worthy in its sonority of Berlioz or Wagner. Whether Satan could make himself heard in Pandemonium may be an open question, but undoubtedly there are moments in The Golden Legend when Lucifer's human representative, be his voice ever so stentorian, is bound to be inaudible. All that artistic singing could do to lend the character its proper prominence was done by Mr. King.

King performed in the Triennial Handel Festivals in 1880, 1882, and 1885. He sang the role of Mephistopheles in the English premiere of Berlioz's La damnation de Faust at the Royal Albert Hall in 1882. He retired from performance in 1890.

== Later years ==
King married Eva née Hume (born 1863) in London in 1882, and they had two children, Mary Eva Oakley King (1883–1955) and Ernest Archibald Frederic King (1888–1973).

On retiring from the concert platform King taught singing at the Royal College of Music for 42 years, from 1889 to 1931. Among his students were Norman Allin, Miriam Licette, Muriel O'Malley, Robert Radford, David Brazell, William Samuell and Herbert Heyner. After his retirement from the Royal Academy of Music he continued to give lessons privately, the last being just before he was taken ill a week before his death.

King died in May 1933 aged 80 at his home in Hampstead after a short illness. His funeral service took place at Golders Green Crematorium on 22 May 1933. In his will he left his widow and children £1,375.
