= The Golden Legend (cantata) =

1886 canata by Arthur Sullivan and Joseph Bennet

Early vocal score, c. 1889

The Golden Legend is an 1886 cantata by Arthur Sullivan with libretto by Joseph Bennett, based on the 1851 poem of the same name by Henry Wadsworth Longfellow. The piece premiered at the triennial Leeds Music Festival. At least 17 performances of the cantata were given in Britain during the first year after its premiere in October 1886, and during Sullivan's lifetime it was widely considered his greatest and most successful work of serious music. Indeed, outside of the comic operas with W. S. Gilbert, this cantata was widely regarded as Sullivan's most successful large-scale composition.

A few days after the first performance, Gilbert wrote to Sullivan, "I congratulate you heartily on the success of the Cantata which appears from all accounts to be the biggest thing you've done." In May 1888, there was a performance of the work at the Royal Albert Hall by command of Queen Victoria. She sent for Sullivan after the performance and said, "At last I have heard The Golden Legend, Sir Arthur ... You ought to write a grand opera – you would do it so well."

Numerous amateur choral societies performed the work, and at one point the composer declared a moratorium on its performance, fearing that it was becoming over-exposed. After Sullivan's death there was a steady decline in the frequency of performances of The Golden Legend, in common with all of his serious compositions, and the arrival of a new generation of composers, beginning with Edward Elgar, brought fresh new choral and symphonic works to the British musical scene that crowded out Romantic music. In recent decades, however, there has been a significant revival of interest in Sullivan's compositions, including The Golden Legend.

== Background ==
Sullivan had been associated with the prestigious triennial Leeds Music Festival, both as conductor and composer, since 1880, when his choral work The Martyr of Antioch had its premiere at Leeds Town Hall. By 1886, Sullivan was serving as the Leeds Festival's musical director for the third time, and the Festival Committee had commissioned him to compose a new choral work. In January 1886, having settled on his subject, but having tried and failed to arrange a libretto himself, he asked Joseph Bennett to prepare the libretto based on Longfellow's epic poem The Golden Legend.

Page from a proof score of The Golden Legend signed by Sullivan, 1886

Only weeks before Sullivan began composing The Golden Legend in the spring of 1886, Franz Liszt visited London. Sullivan had met Liszt many years earlier in Leipzig, when Sullivan was a student there, and he now escorted the older composer to functions given in his honour. During this visit, Liszt's music was heard in London, including his sacred cantata, The Legend of St Elisabeth. Liszt had, in 1874, set the prologue of The Golden Legend as Die Glocken des Strassburger Münsters, and some commentators assert that the influence of Liszt, and particularly of these two works, is discernible in Sullivan's cantata.

With The Mikado drawing large audiences in London and New York, Sullivan began composing The Golden Legend in Yorktown, Camberley, England, on 24 April 1886, and rehearsals began on 10 September 1886. Like Sullivan's other Leeds Festival pieces, such as The Martyr of Antioch, the work was presented on a grand scale, with 325 voices and 120 orchestra players. In addition to the usual orchestra instruments, Sullivan augmented the woodwind section with piccolos, cor anglais, bass clarinet and contrabassoon, cornets in addition to trumpets, and included prominent parts for bells, harp and organ. The festival was held 13–16 October 1886, and the premiere of The Golden Legend took place on Saturday, 16 October 1886; its success with audiences and critics alike was immediate.

Sullivan and soloists at the premiere of the 1886 Leeds Festival

== Characters and original singers ==
- Elsie, soprano – Emma Albani
- Ursula, contralto – Janet Monach Patey
- Prince Henry, tenor – Edward Lloyd
- Lucifer, bass – Frederic King
- A Forester, bass – Robert Watkin-Mills
- Chorus

== Synopsis ==
The Prologue depicts a storm raging around Strasbourg Cathedral as Lucifer and his spirits of the air try to tear down the cross from the spire, only to be chased away by the ringing of the bells. This failure foreshadows Lucifer's ultimate defeat.

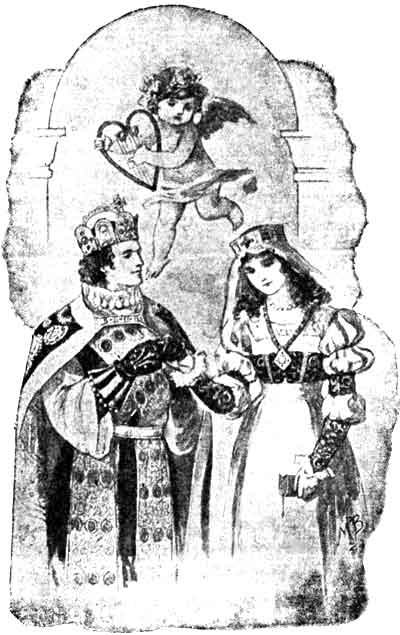
The Prince and Elsie – illustration to Longfellow's poem

Scene one depicts Prince Henry of Hoheneck at his Castle of Vautsberg on the Rhine being tempted by Lucifer. Henry has been stricken with a strange malady, and the famous physicians of Salerno have told him that the only cure is the blood of a maiden who shall, of her own free will, consent to die for his sake. Viewing this as unlikely, he gives way to despair and allows Lucifer, disguised as a travelling physician, to administer alcohol to him in such measure that he is deprived of his position in society and power as a ruler, and becomes an outcast.

In the second scene, Prince Henry finds shelter in the cottage of one of his vassals, Ursula, whose daughter, Elsie, moved by great compassion for him upon learning the cure for his illness, offers herself in sacrifice, despite her mother's misgivings. Elsie hopes that by giving her life for Henry, she will become closer to Christ. Elsie and Henry set out for Salerno.

Scene three has Elsie and Henry travelling to Salerno, although Henry is disturbed by the fate that awaits Elsie. They pass a band of pilgrims, which is joined by a friar who is really Lucifer in disguise. Lucifer gloats over Elsie's fate, and Elsie and Henry find comfort in each other.

The couple arrive in Salerno in scene four, where Lucifer reappears disguised as Friar Angelo, a doctor of the medical school. Despite the opposition of the Prince, who now declares that he intended to do no more than test her constancy, Elsie persists in her resolve to die for him. Lucifer plans to claim Elsie's soul for his own rather than let it rise to Heaven. He draws Elsie into an inner chamber, but at the last minute, Henry breaks down the door and rescues her from the "doctor" and eternal damnation.

In the fifth scene, a forester brings the news to an anxious Ursula that her daughter is not dead. Miraculously healed, Prince Henry marries Elsie and is restored to his rightful place. The final scene finds Henry and Elsie on the evening of their wedding day. An epilogue provides the moral and explains that Prince Henry's malady was cured by love. Elsie's devotion is compared to the course of a mountain brook that cools and fertilises the arid plain.

== Musical numbers ==
Prologue

- Nocte surgentes (Hasten, hasten) – Lucifer and Chorus

Scene 1

- I cannot sleep – Henry
- All hail, Prince Henry – Lucifer and Henry
- Behold it here – Lucifer, Henry and Chorus
- Drink, drink, and thy soul shall sink – Lucifer, Henry and Chorus

Scene 2

- Slowly, slowly up the wall – Ursula
- Evening Hymn – Chorus and Henry
- Who was it said 'Amen'? – Ursula and Elsie
- I heard Him call – Elsie and Ursula
- My Redeemer and my Lord – Elsie
- My life is little – Elsie, Henry and Chorus

Scene 3

- Onward and onward – Elsie, Henry and Chorus
- Here am I too – Lucifer, Elsie and Chorus
- It is the sea – Henry
- The night is calm and cloudless – Elsie and Chorus

Scene 4

- My guests approach – Lucifer
- Prince Henry enters – Henry, Lucifer and Elsie
- O pure in heart – Chorus
- Weep not, my friends – Elsie and Henry
- Come with me, this Way – Lucifer, Henry, Elsie and Chorus

Scene 5

- Who is it coming? – Ursula and Forester
- Virgin, who lovest the poor – Ursula

Scene 6

- We are alone – Henry and Elsie
- Dear Elsie – Henry and Elsie
- In life's delight – Henry and Elsie

Choral Epilogue

- God sent His messenger, the rain

== Critical reception ==
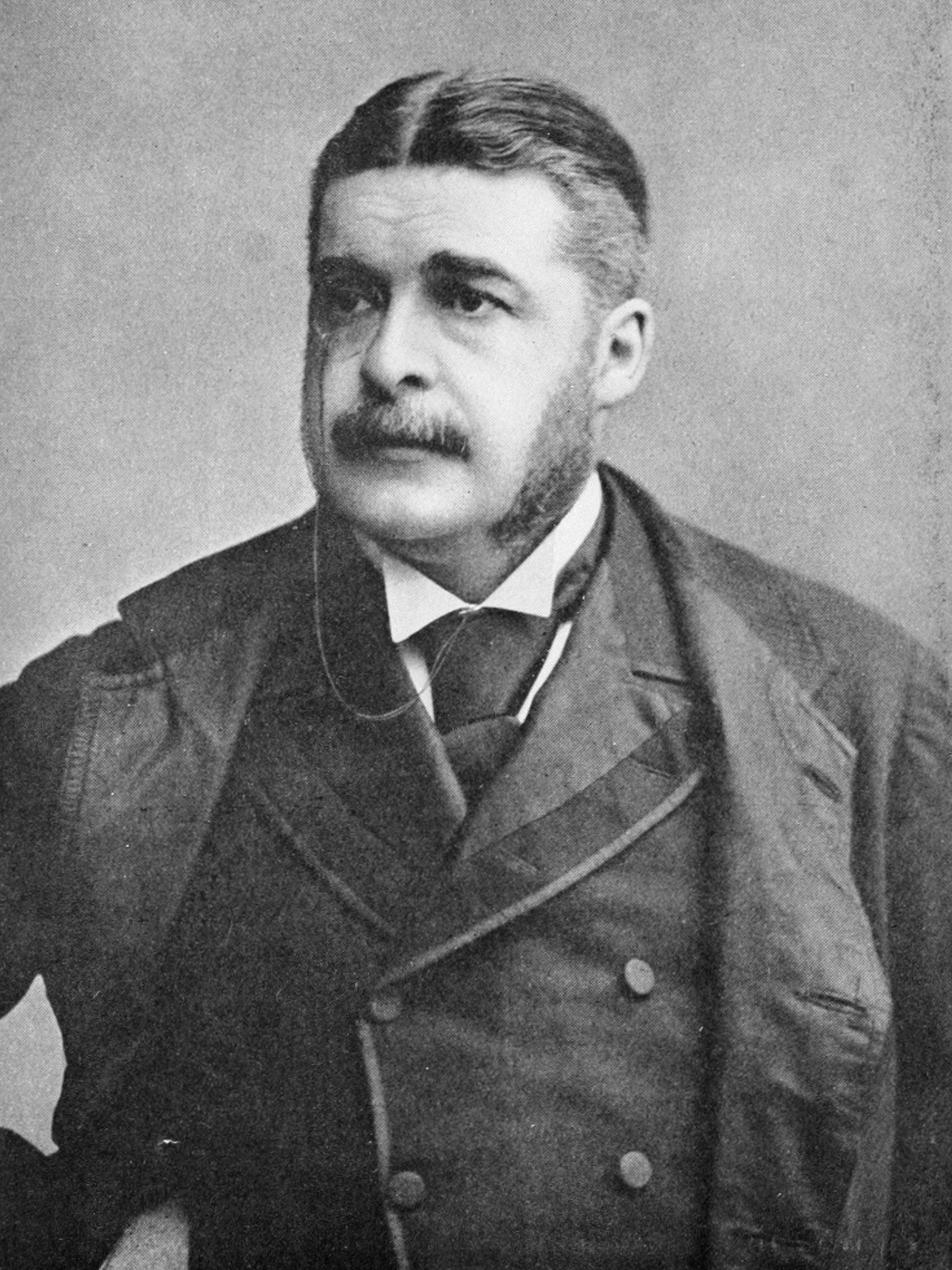
Sir Arthur Sullivan, c. 1886

After the first performance, The Leeds Mercury reported:

How can we describe the scene which followed the last note of the cantata? Let the reader imagine an audience rising to its multitudinous feet in thundering approval; a chorus either cheering with heart and soul or raining down flowers upon the lucky composer; and an orchestra coming out of its habitual calm to wax fervid in demonstration. Never was a more heartfelt ovation. Ovation! nay, it was a greater triumph, one such as acclaimed the successful soldiers of Rome.

The Observer, quoting from the text, said, "'The deed divine shall through all ages burn and shine.' And so shall The Golden Legend." The Manchester Guardian was more cautious, praising the music but suggesting that comparison with Mendelssohn's St. Paul, played in the second half of the concert, was not to Sullivan's advantage. The Times dismissed Longfellow's poem as insipid but praised the music, calling it "a work which, if not of genius in the strict sense of the word, is at least likely to survive till our long-expected English Beethoven appears on the scene." A later writer commented that the judgment of The Times was shrewd, "for Sullivan's serious music lasted only until Elgar's over-mounted it." Nevertheless, Elgar "always spoke with great feeling and respect for Sullivan, and admired The Golden Legend."

When The Golden Legend was recorded in full in 2001, Edward Greenfield wrote in The Gramophone:

It is astonishing to discover that for a decade or so after it first appeared in 1886‚ this oratorio … overtook Elijah as the second most popular oratorio in Britain‚ with Handel's Messiah alone clocking up more performances. Certainly the opening is most striking‚ quite unlike what one would expect of the composer of G&S operettas: first you hear unaccompanied chimes that anticipate the opening of Puccini's Suor Angelica‚ leading almost at once into storm music that owes much to Wagner's Flying Dutchman‚ with the key indeterminate ... The Victorian soppiness of the story remains a barrier. Elsie's prayer‚ for example‚ is glutinous in its sentiment.... One can readily understand why after the Victorians' early enthusiasm the piece ran into total neglect.

== Later performances and recordings ==
In the twentieth century, the work's popularity declined, though occasional performances continued to be given, among them some at Leeds (1904), Cardiff (1907), London (1911, 1921, 1926 and 1927), Norwich (1911), and Belfast (1927). Many amateur performances were also given in the first decades of the century. As late as the 1926–27 season, there were six performances of the piece by British choral societies. Sir Henry Wood never lost his admiration for the work and included part of it in his silver jubilee concert in 1936, alongside the premiere of Vaughan Williams's Serenade to Music.

Wood insisted on mounting a complete performance of The Golden Legend in May 1942 to celebrate the centenary of Sullivan's birth. He prevailed on the BBC to broadcast it, having reminded them that he was "the only living musician who had daily contact with Sir Arthur Sullivan as an accompanist". In 1985 there was a performance at the Queen Elizabeth Hall in London. Charles Mackerras conducted a centenary performance of the work in 1986 in the same building as the premiere, the newly restored Leeds Victoria Hall, which was broadcast on Radio 3. Separate performances were given in 2000 in Edinburgh and Aberystwyth. Another was given at the Longfellow Festival in 2011. Another was given in 2013 near Wallingford, England. A large-scale performance was given in 2019 by the Nuremberg Symphony Orchestra at the Meistersingerhalle, Nuremberg, Germany.

In August 1928, the Australian dramatic soprano Florence Austral made a 78-rpm recording of the soprano piece from the score, The Night is Calm, for His Master's Voice (D 1516). John Barbirolli conducted the orchestra and chorus of the Royal Opera House. A remastered recording was released on CD by Dutton Laboratories (number CDLX 7025).

In 2001, Hyperion released the first professional recording of the work with The London Chorus and New London Orchestra conducted by Ronald Corp.
