= The Martyr of Antioch =

1880 choral work by Arthur Sullivan

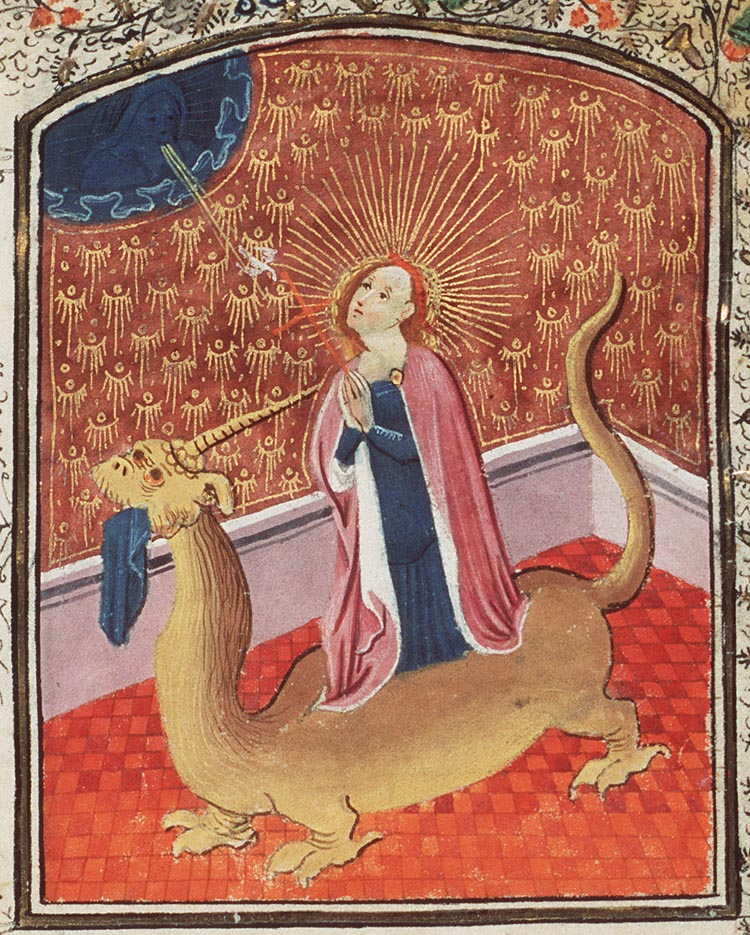
St. Margaret of Antioch

The Martyr of Antioch is a choral work described as a "Sacred Musical Drama" by the English composer Arthur Sullivan. It was first performed on 15 October 1880 at the triennial Leeds Music Festival, having been composed specifically for that event. Sullivan was musical director of the Leeds festival in 1880 and conducted the performance.

The Martyr of Antioch is based on the 1822 epic poem by the Rev. Henry Hart Milman concerning the martyrdom of St. Margaret of Antioch at the end of the 3rd century. Sullivan's friend and collaborator, the dramatist W. S. Gilbert, assisted him in adapting the libretto from Milman's poem. At the Leeds festival of 1886, Sullivan would premiere an even more successful choral work, The Golden Legend.

The work is rarely performed today, though two recordings are available.

== Background ==
In January 1878, the secretary of the triennial Leeds Music Festival's Provisional Committee wrote to Arthur Sullivan to encourage him to compose an oratorio for the 1880 Leeds festival: "I need hardly tell you with what completeness, force, and exceptional choral power we should perform your work, for our recent production of Macfarren's Joseph will be fresh in your memory, if you read or heard the universal praise bestowed upon the Leeds Festival Performance." Sullivan was in France at the time, where he was trying to recover from illness. On his return in March, he answered that he could compose a shorter piece of an hour or an hour and a half, but not a full-length oratorio. The committee accepted his offer. Sullivan's reluctance to compose a full-length oratorio on more than two years' notice casts some doubt on his willingness to devote himself to serious composition. The historian Michael Ainger noted: "He was still only thirty-five, but most of his serious work already lay behind him."

At first, Sullivan intended to prepare a libretto himself based on the biblical David and Jonathan story. He struggled with this task at length and worried that the best bible verses for an oratorio on this subject had already been used by oratorio writers, and his use of them would provoke comparisons with their work. When a suggestion was made that, in view of the economic and political situation in England, the festival be postponed for a year, Sullivan wrote in a letter dated 30 June 1879: "If you carry out the idea of postponing the Leeds festival till 1881, it will be a very great relief to me and a weight off my mind, because, in consequence of my approaching visit to America [where Gilbert and Sullivan would premiere The Pirates of Penzance], I should have very little time to write for the next six months, and I have been seriously perplexed how to manage it." Ultimately, the festival was not postponed. It was announced in June 1880 that Sullivan had turned to an 1822 poem by the Rev Henry Hart Milman (1791–1868), The Martyr of Antioch, as the subject for the oratorio, and that W. S. Gilbert would assist him in adapting the libretto. The poem concerns the martyrdom of St. Margaret of Antioch at the end of the 3rd century.

Sullivan in the early 1880s

Gilbert helped Sullivan to adapt Milman's poem to make it into a libretto suitable for the work. The libretto cuts text considerably, focusing the story more narrowly on the title character, and a new character, Julia, is introduced as a representative of the chorus of sun-worshippers. Milman's sons authorised Sullivan to say that the alterations "had been made with judgment and good taste, and in complete accordance with the spirit of the original work". Sullivan acknowledged Gilbert's contributions in his preface to 'the published score, attributing to Gilbert "the change which in one or two cases (marked with an asterisk [numbers 2, 8 and 10, and also number 15, which is missing the asterisk."]) has been necessary from blank verse to rhyme; and for these and many valuable suggestions, he returns Mr. Gilbert his warm acknowledgements." In gratitude for his assistance, Sullivan gave Gilbert a silver cup inscribed "W.S. Gilbert from his friend Arthur Sullivan. Leeds Festival 1880. The Martyr of Antioch." In return, Gilbert wrote to Sullivan on 3 December:

Dear Sullivan, It always seemed to me that my particularly humble services in connection with the Leeds festival had received far more than their meed of acknowledgement in your preamble to the libretto – and it most certainly never occurred to me to look for any other reward than the honour of being associated, however remotely and unworthily, in a success which, I suppose, will endure until music itself shall die. Pray believe that of the many substantial advantages that have resulted to me from our association, this last is, and always will be, the most highly prized."

In January 1880, the festival committee, after considering other conductors, asked Sullivan to conduct the Leeds festival, which was to run from 13 to 16 October. This was a popular choice, as one columnist wrote, "for an English Festival we are to have an English conductor. Too long have we in this country bowed down to foreign talent, even when it has been far inferior to English talent." When Sullivan stood before the festival chorus of 306 voices for his first rehearsal in Leeds on 4 June 1880, they greeted him with cheers and applause. On 31 August he first rehearsed The Martyr of Antioch at Leeds. He outlined the narrative of the new work to the chorus before proceeding with the rehearsal, which was reported in a local newspaper:

[T]he warm praise that the composer-conductor bestowed on the singers at the conclusion of the rehearsal was well deserved. ... These pleasant congratulations were not all on one side, for after several of the choruses the vocalists manifested their appreciation of the composer's success and talent.

== Performance and aftermath ==
The premiere of The Martyr of Antioch took place on 15 October 1880 at Leeds Town Hall, employing impressive forces: The orchestra numbered 111 instrumentalists, and there were 306 choristers. The audience numbered more than 2,000 including Sullivan's mother and his friend, Alfred, Duke of Edinburgh, who was President of the festival. The oratorio formed the first half of the programme that morning, followed by a performance of Beethoven's Mass in C and Schubert's Song of Miriam in the second half. The Leeds Mercury's reviewer wrote:

[T]he cheers which greeted the arrival of Mr. Sullivan were renewed with still more vigour and enthusiasm at the close of his new work. ... The whole assemblage, indeed, joined in a hearty tribute of praise. ... [T]he strength of The Martyr of Antioch lies in its beautiful Pagan choruses, so full of character and colour; in the first and last airs of Margarita...; in the Funeral Music of the Christians; in the love music of Olybius; and, with reference to the entire work, in charmingly varied and appropriately coloured orchestration. ... [T]he dramatic portions of the Cantata ... are inferior in treatment, and consequently in result, to those of a lyrical nature. Hence a comparative want of effect in the scene between Margarita and her father, and between the same person and her lover, when revelation is made of a change of faith, meaning nothing less than death to the convert. ... This opinion, however, is based upon purely dramatic considerations. Regarding the situation from a musical point of view, there is nothing in the work we would willingly have sacrificed to make room for dramatic expansion. ... A word is certainly called for by Mr. Sullivan's orchestrations. Few living musicians know better than our composer how to employ the resources of instrumentation. ... He uses the orchestra, as not abusing it, charming attentive ears by touches of delicate fancy in form and pleasing cultured taste by a harmony of colour. ... All this the scoring of The Martyr of Antioch proves beyond dispute. It never wearies by sameness or repels by eccentricity.

Other critics agreed that the music had much to admire, but the work failed to achieve sufficient dramatic effect; some mentioned a lack of sufficient reverence, as the Pagans are treated sympathetically in both text and music. The performance of the cantata at the festival under Sullivan's baton earned praise, as did his performance as musical director of the festival, and he was invited back to conduct the next six Leeds festivals. At the Leeds festival of 1886, Sullivan would premiere an even more successful choral work, The Golden Legend.

Sullivan conducted the cantata two months later in London, on 11 December 1880, at The Crystal Palace, together with his overture In Memoriam. The piece was again a popular success and mostly well received by the critics, with the same reservations as they had expressed at its premiere. It was repeated occasionally over the ensuing years, but after the introduction of The Golden Legend in 1886, The Martyr was heard only rarely. Like many of Sullivan's other major choral pieces, it is, or at least was considered, theatrical in conception. In 1898, it was mounted as an opera by the Carl Rosa Opera Company; Sullivan made a few changes to the piece to adapt it as an opera. The piece was performed for the first time in the United States with orchestra in 2018 by Utopia Opera, conducted by William Remmers.

== Characters and original soloists ==
Heathens:

- Olybius, the Roman Prefect (tenor) – Edward Lloyd
- Callias, the Priest of Apollo and father of Margarita (baritone) – Frederic King
- Julia, a worshipper of the Sun (contralto) – Janet Monach Patey
- Maidens and youths, worshippers of the Sun (Apollo)

Christians:

- Fabius, Bishop of Antioch (bass) – Henry Cross
- Margarita, daughter of Callias (soprano) – Emma Albani
- The Christian Congregation.

== Synopsis ==
The action of the piece is laid at Antioch, in Syria (now Turkey), at the end of the third century.

Olybius the Prefect is in love with Margarita, and she returned his love. This, however, was in her heathen days. She is now a Christian, and with her conversion, of which both her lover and her father are ignorant, she, although still not indifferent to him, rejects all idea of union with a heathen. The chorus of sun-worshippers, led by Julia, gather, giving glory and praise to Apollo with a sacrifice of a hundred cattle and libations of honeyed wine. The Prefect calls for Margarita to take her accustomed place and lead the worship of Apollo with her grace and lyre, but she fails to appear. The Priest charges Olybius with lukewarmness in the cause of Apollo by letting "sleep / The thunders of the law". He notes that Galileans (Christians) have achieved high places and sanctuary, instead of being smitten, as they should be. The Prefect admits that he has taken the path of "contemptuous mercy", but he now vows his firm intention to follow the edict of the Emperor and put all Christians to death.

Later, in the Christian cemetery, after the burial of one of the brethren, a hymn is sung over him. After the funeral, the heathens approach and the Christians disperse. Margarita remains behind and pours forth her feelings in adoration of the Saviour. Her father, the Priest of Apollo, finds her thus employed. She hopes to tell him gently of her conversion. He asks her to sacrifice to Apollo, and she tells him that she cannot. He asks her if she denies the god of Antioch. She replies, "No god is he ... /Withering before the all-enlightening Lamb". Callais asks her to look to the sky to see enthroned sun god: "Is he not life and light?" Margarita denies the divinity of the sun. Later, in the palace of the Prefect, the maidens of Apollo sing their evening song. Olybius and Margarita are left together; he begins his old endearments and dilates on the glories which will be hers when they are united. She then confesses that she is a Christian, says that her faith is the path to glory. She tells him that if he will learn and believe in Jesus Christ, then she can be his; this is her noble dowry to him. He curses her religion, and she bids him "farewell forever". She leaves for prison.

Outside the prison of the Christians, on the road to the Temple of Apollo, the heathen maidens, led by Julia, chant the glories of Apollo ("Io Paean!"), while from within the prison are heard the more solemn and determined strains of the Christians. Margarita is brought forward and required to make her choice. She proclaims her faith in Christ, concluding that "Thou and I / Shall [on Judgement Day] give an account of this day's process / And Christ shall render each his own reward." Her lover (noting that "the rapture of her speech [doth] enkindle / The brightness of her beauty" whilst observing her "burst fillet") and her father urge her to retract, and pray for the mercy of heaven, but in vain. Margarita is unwavering: "I see the star-paved land / Where all the angels stand". She dies with the words of rapture on her lips:

The Christ, the Christ, commands me to his home;
Jesus, Redeemer, Lord, I come! I come! I come!

== Structure and musical numbers ==
Sullivan (top right) and colleagues at the 1880 Leeds festival where The Martyr of Antioch was premiered

Scene I – The Front of the Temple of Apollo

- Introduction
- No. 1. Chorus: "Lord of the golden day!"; Solo: (Julia): "The love-sick damsel"
- No. 2. Solo: (Callias) "Break off the hymn"; Aria: (Olybius): "Come Margarita, come!"
- No. 3. Duet: (Olybius & Callias) "Great Olybius"
- No. 4. Chorus: "Long live the Christians' scourge"

Scene II – The Burial Place of the Christians – Night

- Organ solo
- No. 5. Funeral Anthem: "Brother, thou art gone before us"
- No. 6. Solo: (Fabius) "Brother, thou slumberest"
- No. 7. Solo Recit. & Hymn: (Margarita) "Yet once again"
- No. 8. Duet: (Callais & Margarita) "My own, my loved, my beauteous child"

Scene III – The Palace of the Prefect

- No. 9. Chorus: (Evening Song of the Maidens) "Come away with willing feet"
- No. 10. Recit. & Air: (Olybius) "Sweet Margarita, give me thine hand"
- No. 11. Duet: (Margarita & Olybius) "Oh hear me, Olybius!"

Scene IV – Outside the Prison of the Christians

- No. 12. Chorus: "Now glory to the god who breaks"
- No. 13. Solo: (Julia with Chorus) "Io Paean!"
- No. 14. Scene: (Margarita, Julia, Olybius & Callias with Chorus) "Great is Olybius"
- No. 15. Quartet: (Margarita, Julia, Olybius & Callias): "Have mercy, unrelenting heaven!"
- No. 16. Finale: "The hour of mercy's o'er"

== Recordings and full score ==
The Martyr of Antioch is rarely performed today, though two recordings are available. A professional recording was made at the International Gilbert and Sullivan Festival in 2000, and an amateur recording was issued by The Sir Arthur Sullivan Society in the 1980s. In addition, various selections from the work have been recorded over the past few decades. The work's orchestra parts were lost after the performance in 2000, but a critical edition of the score was published in 2017, edited by Robin Gordon-Powell and Martin Wright, with orchestral parts and vocal scores published in 2018.
