= Sims Reeves =

British opera singer (1821–1900)

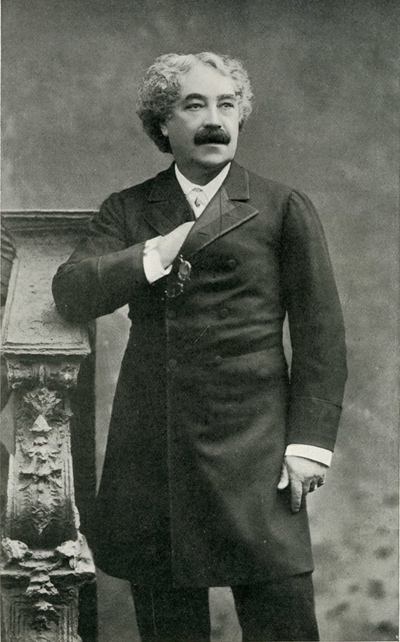
Reeves, c. 1889

John Sims Reeves (21 October 1821 – 25 October 1900) was an English operatic, oratorio and ballad tenor vocalist during the mid-Victorian era.

Reeves began his singing career in 1838 but continued his vocal studies until 1847. He soon established himself on the opera and concert stage and became known for his interpretation of ballads. He continued singing through the 1880s and later taught and wrote about singing.

== Musical beginnings ==
Sims Reeves was born in Shooter's Hill, in Kent, England. His parents were John Reeves, a musician of Yorkshire origin, and his wife, Rosina. He received his earliest musical education from his father, a bass soloist in the Royal Artillery Band, and probably through the bandmaster, George McKenzie. By the age of fourteen he was appointed choirmaster of North Cray church and performed organist's duties. He seems to have studied medicine for a year but changed his mind when he gained his adult voice: it was at first a baritone, training under Thomas Simpson Cooke. He also learnt oboe, bassoon, violin, cello and other instruments. He later studied piano under Johann Baptist Cramer.

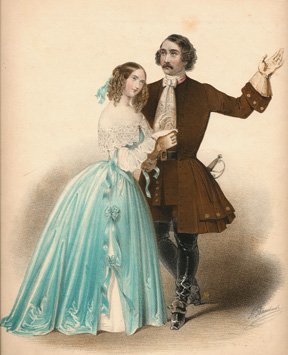
Reeves with Catherine Hayes at La Scala, 1846

He made his earliest appearance at Newcastle in 1838 or 1839 as the Gipsy boy in Henry Bishop's Guy Mannering, and as Count Rodolfo in La sonnambula (baritone parts). Later he performed at the Grecian Saloon, London, under the name of Johnson. He continued to study voice with Messrs. Hobbs and T. Cooke and appeared under William Macready's management at Drury Lane (1841–1843) in subordinate parts in spoken theatre and in Henry Purcell's King Arthur ("Come if you dare"), Der Freischütz (as Ottokar), and Acis and Galatea in 1842 when Handel's pastoral was mounted on the stage with Clarkson Frederick Stanfield's scenery.

In summer 1843 Reeves studied in Paris under the tenor and pedagogue Marco Bordogni of the Paris Conservatoire. Bordogni was responsible for opening and developing the upper (tenor) octave of his voice into the famous rich and brilliant head notes. From October 1843 to January 1844 Reeves appeared in a very varied programme of musical drama, including the roles of Elvino in La sonnambula and Tom Tug in Charles Dibdin's The Waterman, at the Manchester theatre, and over the next two years also performed in Dublin, Liverpool and elsewhere in the provinces. In the same period, especially from 1845, he continued his studies abroad, notably under Alberto Mazzucato (1813–1877), the dramatic composer and teacher then newly appointed singing instructor at the Milan Conservatory.

His debut in Italian opera was made on 29 October 1846 at La Scala in Milan as Edgardo in Donizetti's Lucia di Lammermoor, partnered by Catherine Hayes: he received a fine reception, and Giovanni Battista Rubini paid his respects in person. (This role became Reeves's greatest, and his wife therefore nicknamed him 'Gardie'.) For six months he sang at the principal Italian opera houses, and finally in Vienna, where he was rescued from his contract and returned to England.

== 1844–1848: English debuts in opera and concert ==
He returned to London in 1847, appearing in May at a benefit concert for William Vincent Wallace, and in June at one of the 'Antient Concerts'. In September 1847 he sang in Edinburgh with Jenny Lind. His first principal role on the English operatic stage was with Louis-Antoine Jullien's English Opera company at Drury Lane Theatre in December 1847 in Lucia, in English text, with Mme Doras Gras (Lucia) and Willoughby Weiss, winning immediate and near-universal acclaim, not least from Hector Berlioz, who conducted the performance. (Berlioz mistook him for an Irishman.) In the same season, in Balfe's The Maid of Honour (based on the subject of Flotow's Martha), he created the part of Lyonnel. In May 1848 he joined Benjamin Lumley's company at Her Majesty's Theatre and sang Linda di Chamounix with Eugenia Tadolini, but he severed the connection when Italo Gardoni was brought in to sing Edgardo in Lucia opposite Jenny Lind. But that autumn in Manchester he sang in Lucia and La sonnambula, days after Lind appeared in the same works there, and Reeves obtained the better houses. Reeves sang La sonnambula and Lucia at Covent Garden in October.

In oratorio, Reeves first sang Messiah in Glasgow, Scotland, during 1844. In February 1848 he sang Handel's Judas Maccabaeus, at Exeter Hall for John Pyke Hullah, Acis and Galatea in March and Jephtha in April and May. He was, meanwhile establishing himself as the leading ballad-singer in England. In September 1848 at the Worcester festival he took a solo in Elijah, and sang in Beethoven's Christ on the Mount of Olives, and packed the hall in a recital of Oberon. At the Norwich Festival he was sensational in Elijah and Israel in Egypt. After his November appearance at the Sacred Harmonic Society in Judas Maccabaeus, a critic wrote, 'the mantle of Braham is destined to fall' (on Reeves). Critic Henry Chorley wrote that Reeves had created 'a positive revolution in the interpretation of Handel's oratorios.'

== Italian opera ==
Reeves toured in Dublin at Theatre Royal in 1849, for Mr Calcraft. After his successful engagement he attended the debut there of the Irish soprano Catherine Hayes, in Lucia: her Edgardo, Sig. Paglieri, was hissed from the stage, and Reeves was obliged to stand in for the performance. His London Covent Garden Italian debut was in 1849, as Elvino in Bellini's La sonnambula, opposite Fanny Tacchinardi Persiani (the creator of the title role in Lucia): he made a great effect of full lyrical declamation in Tutto e sciolto... Ah! perche non-posso odiarti?. After his Edgardo in Lucia, Reeves's Elvino was generally considered his finest role in Italian opera. In the winter of 1849 he returned to English opera, and in 1850 at Her Majesty's he made a further great success in Verdi's Ernani, opposite the Elvira of Mdlle Parodi and Carlo of Giovanni Belletti, who was about to embark on an American tour at the invitation of Jenny Lind. In encores, the cry of 'Reeves!' became widespread.

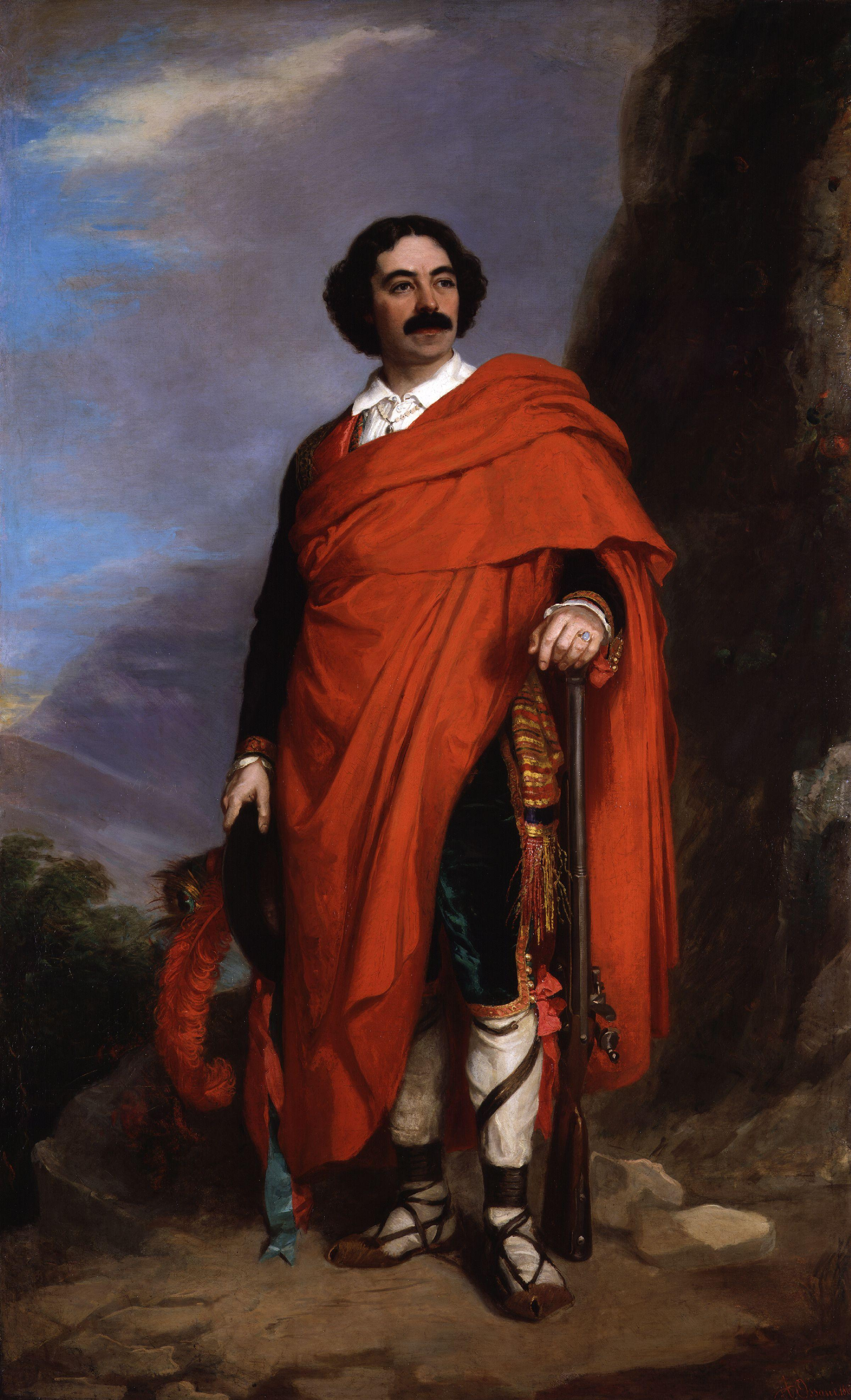
Reeves in the title role of Fra Diavolo, which he first performed in 1852 at Drury Lane

On 2 November 1850, he married Charlotte Emma Lucombe (1823–1895), a soprano who had a brief but brilliant season at the Sacred Harmonic Society and had joined the same company as Reeves at Covent Garden. There she appeared with success as Haydee in Auber's opera, and remained on the stage for four or five years after their marriage. Emma Reeves idolised her husband and in later years became almost obsessively attentive to his comfort and reputation. In February 1851 they returned to Dublin, where Reeves was to have performed with the soprano Giulia Grisi: she, however, was indisposed, and Mr. and Mrs. Reeves appeared together there instead in the lead roles in Lucia di Lammermoor, La Sonnambula, Ernani and Bellini's I Puritani. Reeves also played there Macheath in the Beggar's Opera. Emma and Sims Reeves had five children, of whom Herbert Sims Reeves and Constance Sims Reeves became professional singers.

Dublin was followed immediately by Lumley engagements at the Théâtre des Italiens, Paris, where he sang Ernani, Carlo in Linda di Chamounix (opposite Henriette Sontag) and Gennaro in Donizetti's Lucrezia Borgia. In 1851 Reeves sang Florestan in Fidelio to Sophie Cruvelli's Leonore, and some thought he outshone her.

== 1850s: focus on concerts ==
During the next three decades, Reeves was the leading tenor in Britain. He had the honour of singing privately for Queen Victoria and Prince Albert. Michael Costa, Arthur Sullivan and the other leading British composers of the period wrote tenor parts specifically for him. He could command fees as high as £200 per week for his appearances.

Reeves was generous to younger singers, and this generosity later redounded to his own benefit. In around 1850, Reeves gave encouragement to James Henry Mapleson, who applied to him for advice as a singer, sending him off to study with Mazzucato at the Milan conservatory. In 1855 he gave the young Charles Santley friendly encouragement, recommending that he should contact Lamperti in his forthcoming studies in Italy, and they were afterwards introduced during the interval of a Royal Philharmonic concert. Reeves's concert association with Santley continued until the last year of his life. Mapleson, who became an important theatre manager, promoted Reeves's operatic appearances of the 1860s.

During the 1850s, Reeves's career moved away from the stage and increasingly focused upon concert work. Reeves sang throughout the English provinces. Michael Costa (afterwards Sir Michael) composed two oratorios for the Birmingham Triennial Music Festival with lead tenor parts written for Reeves. The first, Eli, was presented in 1855, and (unusually in oratorio) encores were demanded. The effect of the solo and chorus Philistines, Hark the Trumpet Sounding was electric, and was witnessed in the audience by the three great Italian tenors Mario, Gardoni and Enrico Tamberlik with astonishment.

Reeves scored his greatest triumphs in oratorio at the Handel Festivals at The Crystal Palace. At the inaugural festival of June 1857 he delivered Messiah, Israel in Egypt and Judas Maccabaeus, and these were repeated at the Handel centennial festival of 1859, when he was in company with Willoughby Weiss, Clara Novello, Mme Sainton-Dolby and Giovanni Belletti. In Sound an Alarm during that festival, Reeves created a sensation, and the audience stood to applaud him. Yet the Musical World considered that his "The Enemy Said" from Israel in Egypt surpassed even that, and was the vocal feat of the festival.

At the opening of the Leeds Town Hall in 1858 he was a soloist in the premiere of the pastorale The May Queen by William Sterndale Bennett.

== Return to the stage ==
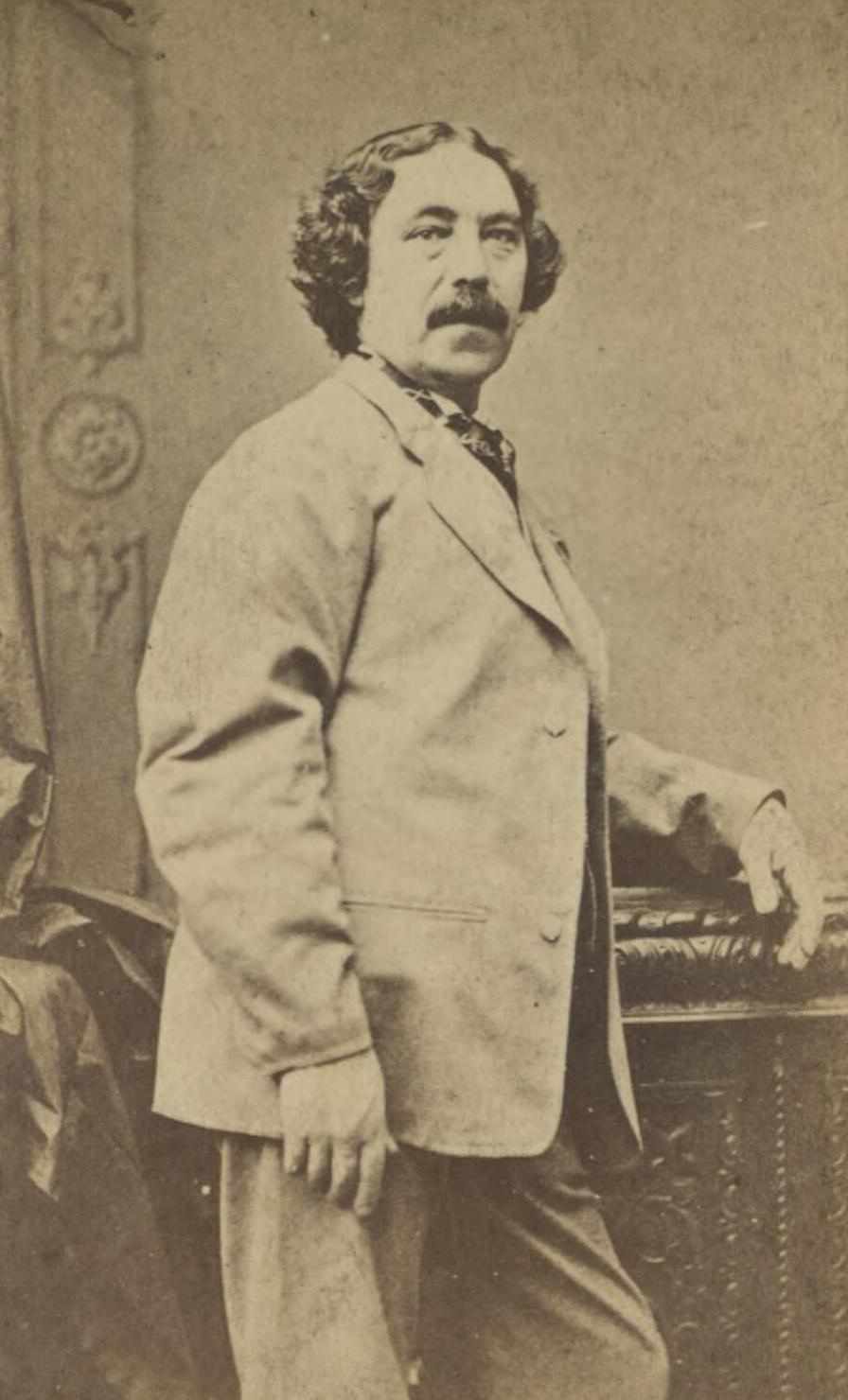
1860s photograph of Reeves

After a period of absence from the stage, in 1859–60 an English version of Gluck's Iphigénie en Tauride by H. F. Chorley was presented by Charles Hallé at Manchester, with Reeves, Charles Santley, Belletti and Catherine Hayes, and two private performances were also given at the Park Lane home of Lord Ward. Mapleson had obtained Reeves, Santley and Helen Lemmens-Sherrington for a summer and winter season from Benjamin Lumley, and in 1860 they had a major success in George Macfarren's Robin Hood (text by John Oxenford) at Her Majesty's, again under Hallé's direction. This new composition had several very effective passages written for Reeves in his role as Locksley, including "Englishmen by birth are free", "The grasping, rasping Norman race", "Thy gentle voice would lead me on", and a grand prison scena. This proved more successful in ticket sales than the alternate Italian nights of Il trovatore and Don Giovanni despite the rival attractions of the soprano Thérèse Tietjens and the tenor Antonio Giuglini.

In 1862, Reeves presented Mazeppa, a cantata written for him by Michael William Balfe. In July 1863 Reeves appeared for Mapleson as Huon in Oberon – the role written for Braham – with Tietjens, Marietta Alboni, Zelia Trebelli, Alessandro Bettini, Edouard Gassier and Santley. After touring that winter as Huon, Edgardo and in the title role of Gounod's Faust, (with Tietjens) in Dublin, in 1864 he appeared at Her Majesty's in Faust and was especially complimented for the dramatic instinct of Faust's soliloquy in Act I and the superb energy of the duet with Mephistopheles which closes the Act. Reeves's reviewer in this role remarks on the fine condition of his voice at this date. Although the critic Eduard Hanslick was told that the voice had already 'gone' in 1862, Herman Klein thought that it was still in its prime in 1866: 'a more exquisite illustration of what is termed the true Italian tenor quality it would be impossible to imagine: and this delicious sweetness, this rare combination of 'velvety' richness with ringing timbre, he retained in diminishing volume almost to the last.'

== Oratorio and cantata ==
In May 1862 at St James's Hall, Reeves took part in what he believed was the first complete performance in England of the St Matthew Passion of J. S. Bach. This was under William Sterndale Bennett, with Mme Sainton-Dolby, and Willoughby Weiss. Of this performance Reeves (who usually respected a composer's scoring absolutely) wrote:

'The tenor part... is in many places so unvocal, and the intervals are so awkward to take, that I was obliged to re-note it: without, of course, disturbing the accents or making it in any way unsuitable to the existing harmony. As soon as I had finished my work, to which I had devoted the greatest possible care, I submitted it to Bennett, who, except in one place, approved of all that I had done; and it was my version of the tenor part which was sung at Bennett's memorable performance, and which is still sung even to this day.'

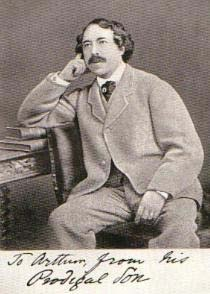
"To Arthur from his Prodigal Son"

In Michael Costa's second oratorio for Reeves, Naaman (first performed autumn 1864), the soloists were Reeves, Adelina Patti (her first appearance in oratorio), Miss Palmer, and Santley. The quartet "Honour and Glory" was repeated by immediate and spontaneous demand. Both oratorios probably owed their original success, and later comparative obscurity, to the fact that Reeves was their ideal interpreter, and with changing vocal fashions no successor could replace him adequately. In 1869 Reeves, Santley and Tietjens sang in the premiere of Arthur Sullivan's cantata The Prodigal Son, at the Worcester Festival. Santley considered Reeves's performance of the passage "I will arise and go to my father" a once-in-a-lifetime experience. Reeves also sang in the premiere of Sullivan's oratorio, The Light of the World, together with Tietjens, Trebelli, and Santley.

Reeves claimed close and primary association with several of the great tenor leads in the oratorios of Handel and Mendelssohn. The songs "Men, Brothers and Fathers, Hearken to me" (from St Paul), and "The Enemy has Said" and "Sound an Alarm" (Judas Maccabaeus) were particular favourites, and his friend Rev Archer Thompson Gurney also extolled his "Waft her, angels" (Jephtha), his Samson and his Acis ("Love in her eyes sits playing").

== Concert pitch debate ==
Reeves's declamation in The Crystal Palace was a main attraction and was repeated at each succeeding triennial festival until 1874. During the later 1860s Reeves felt it necessary to make public representations against the constantly increasing rise in English concert pitch, which was by then half a tone higher than elsewhere in Europe and a full tone higher than in the age of Gluck. The pitch of the organ at the Birmingham Festival was (of necessity) lowered, after a similar reduction had been forced by senior artistes at Drury Lane. Singers such as Adelina Patti and Christina Nilsson made similar demands. However Sir Michael Costa resisted the change, and Reeves finally withdrew his services from the Crystal Palace Handel Festivals, performed by the Sacred Harmonic Society, before the 1877 festival. For this reason he did not appear with the Sacred Harmonic Society thereafter.

== Later years ==
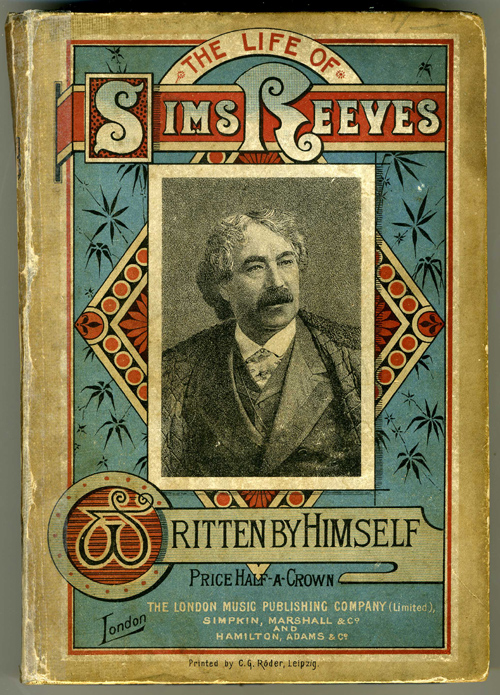
The pictorial cover of Reeves's Memoirs of 1888

In the winter of 1878–1879, he appeared with immense success in The Beggar's Opera and in The Waterman, at Covent Garden. Edward Lloyd, who took Reeves's place as principal tenor at the Handel Festivals, sang with him, and with the tenor Ben Davies, in a performance of the trio for tenor voices 'Evviva Bacco' by Curschmann, at a concert in St James's Hall in 1889.

Reeves's retirement from public life, at first announced as to take place in 1882, did not actually occur until 1891. Then a farewell concert for his benefit was given at the Royal Albert Hall in which Reeves himself performed, supported by Christine Nilsson, and at which he received a eulogy from Sir Henry Irving. George Bernard Shaw remarked that even then, in such Handelian airs as Total Eclipse (Samson), 'he can still leave the next best tenor in England an immeasurable distance behind.' The song "Come Into the Garden, Maud", which Balfe had written for him in 1857, appeared often in his late concerts.

It is certain that Reeves stayed before the public long after his greatest powers had waned. He invested his savings in an unfortunate speculation, and he was compelled to reappear in public for a number of years. In his later career, he frequently withdrew from promised appearances owing to the effects of colds on his fragile vocal equipment, and through an unhappy susceptibility to the effects of nervousness. This also caused him financial difficulties: Besides the loss of income from the engagements, legal judgments for failure to perform were rendered against him, including in 1869 and 1871. The accusation (which gained some currency) that he was given to drink was disavowed by his friend Sir Charles Santley.

In 1890 Shaw stated that Reeves's many cancelled appearances were made entirely for the sake of pure artistic integrity 'which few appreciate fully', but left him at the head of his profession, and had required enormous efforts of artistic conviction, courage, and self-respect. He wrote of a performance of Blumenthal's The Message, 'In spite of all his husbandry, he has but few notes left now; yet the wonderfully telling effect and unique quality of those few still justify him as the one English singer who has worked in his own way, and at all costs, to attain and preserve ideal perfection of tone.'

Klein said much the same as Shaw: 'To hear him, long after he had passed the age of seventy, sing "Adelaide" or "Deeper and Deeper Still" or "The Message" was an exposition of breath control, of tone-colouring, of phrasing and expression, that may truly be described as unique.' Reeves sang in two concerts in the first season of The Proms, at Queen's Hall in 1895 (at which the lower continental pitch was employed). They were the only two concerts of that season that were sold out: all the others made at least £50 loss.

In 1888, Reeves published Sims Reeves, his Life and Recollections, followed by My Jubilee, or, Fifty Years of Artistic Life in 1889. At the same time, he became a teacher at the Guildhall School of Music and Drama. His 1900 book, On the Art of Singing, describes his pedagogic methods. After the death of his wife in 1895, he quickly married one of his students, Lucy Maud Madeleine Richard (b. 1873), and the couple toured South Africa the next year. Reeves died in Worthing, England, on 25 October 1900 and was cremated at Woking.

His widow was brought by Harry Rickards to Australia where, as Maud Sims Reeves, she performed songs made famous by her husband, such as Sally in Our Alley and Come into the Garden, Maude, then after the termination of her contract continued to perform in Western Australia, but became increasingly erratic. A paragraph in the Adelaide Critic,

The arrest of Mrs Sims Reeves in Kalgoorlie, and the fact that she has been placed under restraint on a suspicion of her being insane, will not surprise those who saw her perform in Melbourne. Her singing of her husband's songs was an extraordinary thing to see, if not to hear, and was accompanied with the most eccentric act imaginable. The audiences were deeply puzzled, striving quite earnestly to take the lady seriously because of the name she bore, but unable to reconcile the singer's extraordinary conduct with anything but low comedy.

and repeated in other newspapers, resulted in a libel case, which she won but was left with a ruined reputation and loss of livelihood. At some stage she had remarried was using the name Maud Allison Hartley.

== Vocal example and legacy ==
Braham's The Death of Nelson was prominent in Reeves's concert repertoire. Reeves was naturally aware that his career mirrored that of Braham, and remarked that, like Braham, his success had been many-sided, in opera, oratorio and ballad concerts. The coincidence that his career had begun in the year of Braham's retirement, 1839, and the early reviews saying that he would inherit Braham's mantle, both shaped a prophecy and helped to fulfil it. Braham was a virtuoso of the old Italian school, able to deliver florid passages with intensity, accuracy and declamatory power. In 'assuming his mantle', Reeves consciously imitated his breadth of repertoire, and at his best had a very powerful and flexible declamation combined with great sweetness of tone and melodic power. Shaw classed his 'beautiful firmness and purity of tone' with Patti's and Santley's. Sir Henry Wood compared the caressing nature of his voice with Richard Tauber's, adding, 'I never hear the title of Deeper and deeper still (Handel) without thinking of his lovely inflection and quality.'

In the Handel tenor roles, his immediate successor in the Crystal Palace performances, until 1900, was the English tenor Edward Lloyd, who recorded "Sound an Alarm", "Lend me your Aid" (Gounod – "Reine de Saba"), the tenor solos from Elijah, Braham's Death of Nelson, Dibdin's Tom Bowling and ballads of the declamatory style (such as Frederic Clay's "I'll sing thee songs of Araby"; "Alice, Where Art Thou?" and "Come into the Garden, Maud") – all closely identified with Reeves – in the first years of the twentieth century. In 1903 Herman Klein wrote that 'The mantle of Braham and Sims Reeves, worthily borne by Edward Lloyd, was resting more or less easily upon the shoulders of Ben Davies, a singer whose rare musical instinct and intelligence have always partially atoned for his uneven scale and his lack of ringing head-notes.' (Possibly this suggests some comparison to their great predecessors, in Lloyd's and Davies's style of declamation.) However Klein later admitted that neither Lloyd nor Davies ever laid claim to be Reeves's successor.

Reeves was a member of the Garrick Club, where in his younger days he associated with William Makepeace Thackeray, Charles Dickens, Thomas Talfourd, Charles Kemble, Charles Kean, Albert Smith and Shirley Brooks.

== Sources ==
- H. F. Chorley, Thirty Years' Musical Recollections (Hurst and Blackett, London 1862).
- H. S. Edwards, The life and artistic career of Sims Reeves (1881)
- R. Elkin, Queen's Hall 1893–1941 (Rider, London 1944)
- Arthur Jacobs, Arthur Sullivan: a Victorian musician, 2nd edn (Constable & Co, London 1992)
- H. Klein, Thirty Years of Musical Life in London (Century Co., New York 1903)
- R. H. Legge and W. E. Hansell, Annals of the Norfolk and Norwich triennial musical festivals (1896), pp. 116 and 144
- J. H. Mapleson, The Mapleson Memoirs, 2 vols (Belford, Clarke & Co, Chicago and New York 1888).
- Charles E. Pearce, Sims Reeves – Fifty Years of Music in England (Stanley Paul, 1924)
- S. Reeves, 1888, Sims Reeves, His Life and Recollections, Written by Himself (8th Edn, London 1888).
- S. Reeves, My Jubilee: Or, Fifty Years of Artistic Life (Music Publishing Co. Ltd, London 1889).
- S. Reeves, On the art of singing (1900)
- C. Santley, 1892, Student and Singer, The Reminiscences of Charles Santley (Edward Arnold, London 1892).
- C. Santley, 1909, Reminiscences of my Life (London, Pitman).
- M. Scott, 1977, The Record of Singing to 1914 (London, Duckworth), 48–49.
- G. B. Shaw, 1932, Music in London 1890–94 by Bernard Shaw, Standard Edition 3 Vols
- The Athenaeum, 7 November 1868, p. 610; and 3 November 1900, p. 586
