= Barbican (disambiguation) =

Barbican is a type of fortified building.

Barbican may also refer to:

- Barbican (drink), a brand of malt beverage in Saudi Arabia and the UAE
- Barbican Estate, a residential complex in London
  - Barbican Centre, an arts centre in London
  - Barbican Conservatory, a conservatory in London
- Barbican F.C., a professional football club based in Kingston, Jamaica
- Barbican House, a 16th-century house in Lewes, East Sussex, England
- Barbican Library, a public lending library in the City of London
- The Barbican Muse, a sculpture by Matthew Spender
- Barbican Press, a British independent publishing house
- Barbican tube station, a station on the London Underground
- The Barbican, Plymouth, an area in Plymouth, Devon, England
- Kraków Barbican, a fortified outpost in Kraków, Poland
- USS Barbican, a Chimo-class minelayer in the United States Navy
- Warsaw Barbican, a fortified outpost in Warsaw, Poland
- York Barbican, an indoor entertainment venue located in York, England
