= Maud Perceval Allen =

English opera soprano (1880–1955)

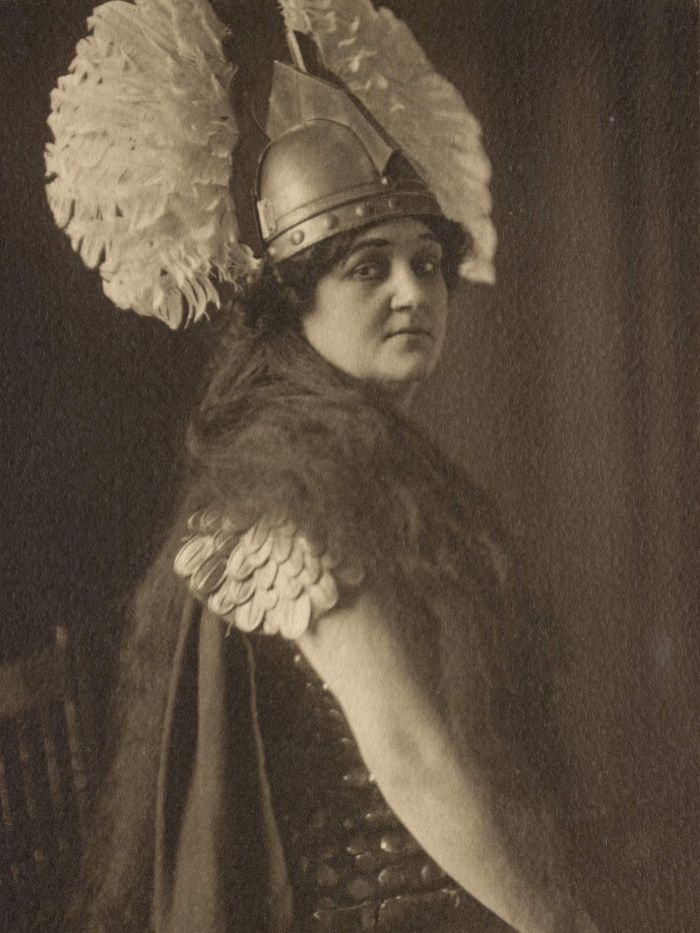
- As Brünnhilde in Der Ring des Nibelungen
- Born: 1880; Ripley
- Died: 1955 (aged 74–75); London
- Occupation: opera singer
- Known for: soprano

Maud Perceval Allen or Maud Percival Allen (1880–1955) was an English soprano.

== Life ==
Allen was born in 1880 in Ripley. Her father Dr. Allen was a noted organist, and Allen displayed a musical ability from an early age, passing violin examinations aged seven. She joined the church choir and she performed as an amateur singer at local concerts.

She studied some oratorio roles with Alberto Randegger, who arranged her first major festival engagement, at the Norwich Festival in 1905. Her debut was with the new London Symphony Orchestra in 1905. She had been trained by the British tenor William Shakespeare.

In 1908 she sang at the Proms in the Queen's Hall.

In 1913 she began a tour that included Australia and cities in the United States.

The bass singer Robert Radford recorded English songs in quartet arrangements (e.g., Pearsall's "O, who will o'er the downs so free?") with John Harrison, Allen or Alice Lakin, and Edna Thornton.

Allen died in London in 1955.

Allen was one of the English speaking singers included in EMI's The Record of Singing.
