= Edward Lloyd (tenor) =

British tenor singer

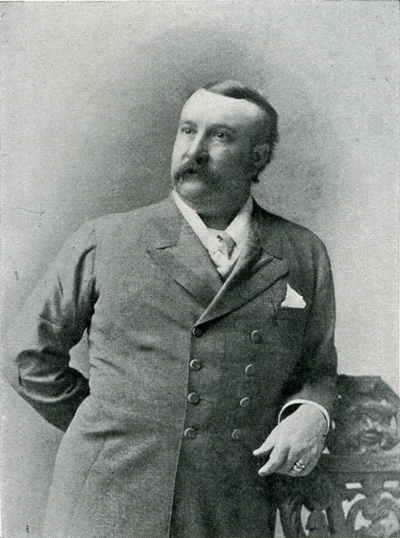
Edward Lloyd, foremost English concert tenor of the 1880s and 1890s. The original performer of the 'soul' in Elgar's The Dream of Gerontius.

Edward Lloyd (7 March 1845 – 31 March 1927) was a British tenor singer who excelled in concert and oratorio performance, and was recognised as a legitimate successor of John Sims Reeves as the foremost tenor exponent of that genre during the last quarter of the nineteenth century.

== Early training in choral tradition ==
Edward Lloyd was born in London, into a musical family. His mother was Louise Lloyd, née Hopkins, of the well-known Hopkins musical family. His father Richard Lloyd had, by invitation, assisted as a counter-tenor on 'Show Sundays' at Worthing when choral concerts were directed by the fourteen-year-old Sims Reeves. Young Lloyd began singing as a chorister at Westminster Abbey, and in 1866 became a member of both Trinity College and King's College chapels in the University of Cambridge. In 1869 he joined the choir of St Andrew's, Wells Street (under Barnby) and was engaged for the Chapel Royal in 1869–71. In 1871 he sang in the St Matthew Passion at the Gloucester Festival, and came prominently to public attention. He never sang in the theatre, possibly because he was short of stature (Charles Santley heard him described as 'a nice, plump little gentleman.'). In 1873 he made his first appearance at St James' Hall with the Royal Philharmonic Society. In the year of his retirement in 1900, he became the Gold Medallist of that Society.

== Vocal characteristics ==
Herman Klein, who heard Lloyd early in his career, was surpassingly impressed by his voice and delivery. He called its quality 'most exquisite', with an amazingly smooth legato, comparable to the great tenor Antonio Giuglini. "Edward Lloyd's is one of those pure, natural voices that never lose their sweetness, but preserve their charm so long as there are breath and power to sustain them. His method is, to my thinking, irreproachable and his style absolutely inimitable. His versatility was greater than that of Sims Reeves, though he was never a stage tenor; for he was equally at home in music of every period and of every school. In Bach and Handel, in modern oratorio, in the Italian aria, in Lied, romance or ballad, he was equally capable of arousing genuine admiration." His performance of 'Love in her eyes sits playing' (Handel, Acis and Galatea) he called 'absolutely unsurpassable', and greater than any Handelian singing heard thereafter. This extremely high praise came from a most discerning critic. David Bispham considered him the foremost tenor of the concert platform.

== Handel Festivals and the mantle of Reeves ==
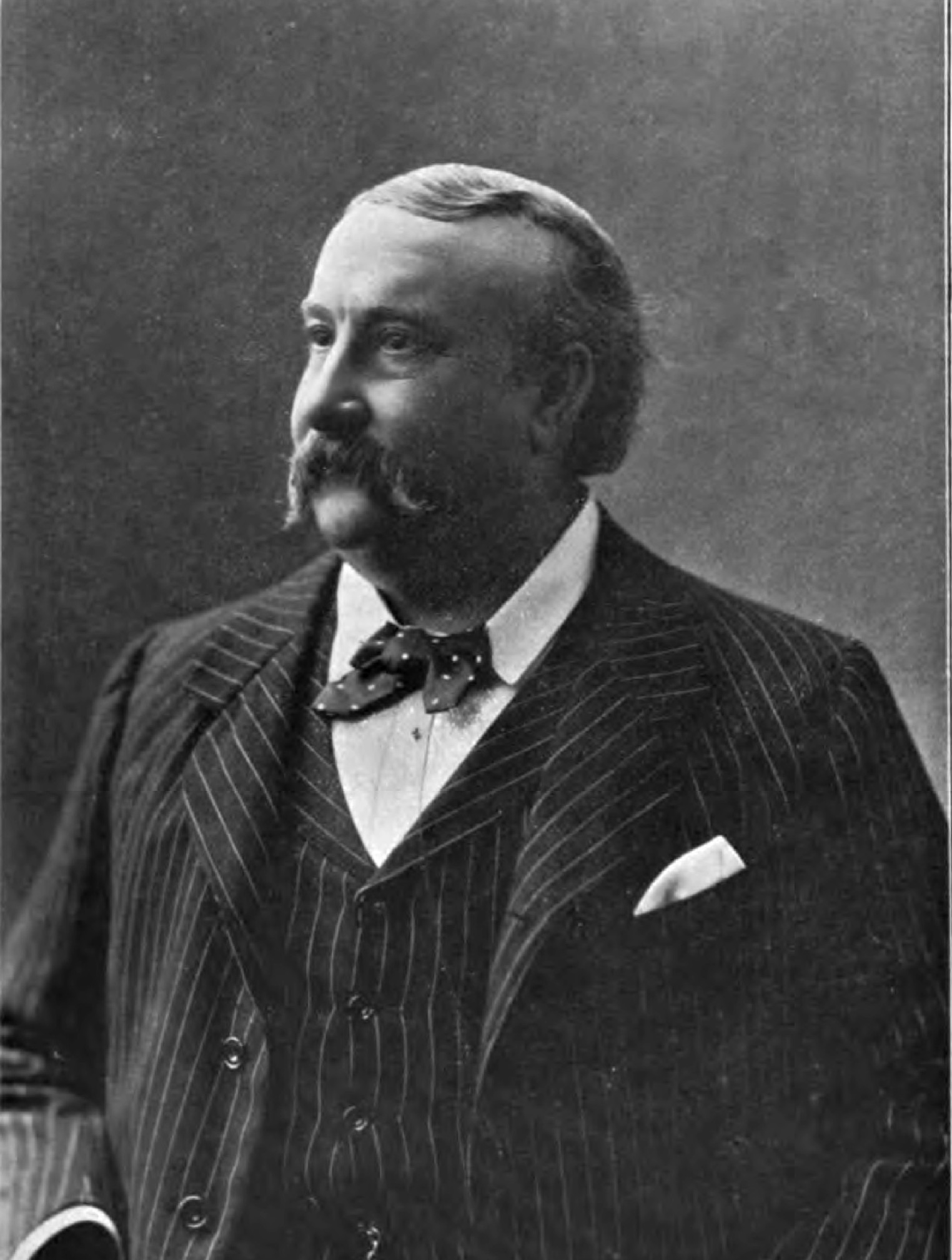
Edward Lloyd, 1899

In 1877, when Sims Reeves withdrew from his engagement for the Handel Triennial Festival at the Crystal Palace over the controversy concerning Concert pitch, Lloyd was engaged instead. He had performed there in Acis and Galatea in 1874, and participated in every subsequent festival there until his retirement in 1900. In these performances before huge audiences in that immense space, his beautiful, resonant and clarion voice carried wonderfully. These festivals might include full performances of Messiah, Israel in Egypt and Judas Maccabaeus on successive nights, each being exceptionally demanding for the tenor (but extremely rewarding for one equal to the task). The earliest 'live' recording of a British concert was made at the Crystal Palace 1888 Festival performance of Israel in Egypt, in which Lloyd was the principal tenor, though unfortunately the selections on the surviving three wax cylinder records do not include any of his actual singing.

== Creator of Oratorio roles ==
Lloyd created many of the great tenor roles in late Victorian oratorio and concert works. In the Hallé Concerts at Manchester he appeared with Charles Santley and Anna Williams in the first performance of an oratorio by Edward Hecht. More significantly, he created lead roles in The Martyr of Antioch (Leeds Festival 1880) and The Golden Legend (1886) of Arthur Sullivan; in the Judith (1888) and King Saul of Hubert Parry; and in the La rédemption (Birmingham Triennial Music Festival, 1882) and Mors et Vita (1884) of Charles Gounod. Lloyd was, therefore, entirely identified with the largest works of the Sacred Musical Drama so characteristic of his age.

== The early 1890s in London ==
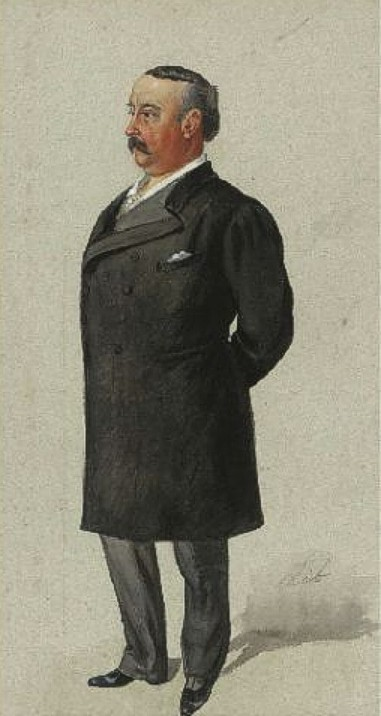
Lloyd as caricatured by Lib for Vanity Fair, 1892

Oratorio
Lloyd was very active during the heyday of George Bernard Shaw's reviewing days. Shaw thought Lloyd in his best vein in Mendelssohn's St. Paul at the Crystal Palace in November 1889; in June 1890 he found the massed performance (3000 executants) an ordeal, but thought Edward Lloyd sang 'without a fault', when Watkin Mills and Mme Patey were in excellent form and Mme Albani her usual self. Shaw despised the massed festivals, but usually much admired Lloyd. In June 1891 at Crystal Palace, if Santley was the hero of the hour, Lloyd was delightful in Love in her eyes sits playing and in one of the Chandos Anthems. But he was out of sorts for The enemy said on the following night, though he had to repeat it, and sustained his reputation.

Lloyd was good again at Birmingham in October 1891, and in a Mozart concert aria in the December centenary celebration. He traveled to the New York in April 1892 where he began a concert tour of cities on the Eastern Coast of North America at Madison Square Garden with oratorio soprano Anna Mooney Burch.

In June 1892 Lloyd proposed Crystal Palace performance of Handel's Samson was substituted by the familiar Judas Maccabaeus to spare Lloyd the difficulty of the new role. However the Judas came off well, with the usual line-up of Santley, Lloyd, Albani and Patey. He appeared on 2 December 1893 at the official opening of the Queen's Hall, in Mendelssohn's Hymn of Praise, with Mme Albani and Margaret Hoare, under the direction of Frederick Cowen. In 1894 it was again Love in her eyes which Lloyd sang to perfection, though again he, Mme Albani, Ben Davies and Nellie Melba all had to accord first place in popular esteem to Charles Santley, who received stupendous applause. On Jubilee Sunday 1897 he performed the Mendelssohn Hymn of Praise with Mme Albani and Agnes Nicholls.

Concert opera
Lloyd had an ovation at St James's Hall for his Siegfried's forging scene in July 1888 under Hans Richter. The Philharmonic orchestra gave him a 'mundane' accompaniment in Lohengrin's grail narration in January 1889, and in Siegfried's forge his laugh was too well-bred, 'hardly the exultant shout of a young giant over his anvil'; and William Nicholl was out of tune as Mime. In July 1889 even Richter's wonderful conducting of Berlioz's Damnation of Faust could not (for Shaw) redeem Lloyd's 'wanton tampering' and 'annoyingly vulgar alteration' of important passages, and even in performances a few years later did not quite forget it, though he admitted Lloyd had set a standard in the work.

In March 1890 his 'Preislied' from Meistersinger was the key attraction at Crystal Palace. In July 1890, Lloyd 'sang well', but tended to 'jingoism', 'genteel piety' and 'sentimentality' in the Lohengrin Act 3 under Richter, but 'he was not Lohengrin.' In March 1891 his Tannhäuser in a concert performance of the last act was 'beyond cavil'. At the Richter concert of June 1891 he sang Tannhäuser's Rome Narrative and the Siegfried forging music 'very tunefully and smoothly, without, however, for a moment relinquishing his original character as Mr Edward Lloyd.' In the Lohengrin and Tannhäuser third acts repeated at Queen's Hall in May 1894, Lloyd was 'playing a little to the gallery by a style of declamation not exactly classic, though sufficiently sincere and effective.'

== Elgar: Caractacus and Gerontius ==
As the creator of Sacred roles, it was natural that he was chosen to give first performances of lead roles in Elgar's Caractacus (1898) and The Dream of Gerontius, in which the form entirely broke free from the older 'Sacred cantatas' (a term Elgar specifically forbade with reference to Gerontius.) It is well known that the first performance of the latter, which occurred on 3 October 1900 under the baton of Hans Richter at the Birmingham Festival, was a disaster. Having created Caractacus, Lloyd had adapted himself to Elgar's musical idiom. He was certainly very nervous and, far from underestimating the task, suffered great anxiety on this occasion, being near the end of his career and not in particularly good voice. The long and taxing nature of the role, and the frequent standing up to sing and sitting down again, had an unfortunate effect.

In that performance Harry Plunket Greene sang the baritone roles and the angel was sung by Marie Brema. Gerontius was not only the pivot of Elgar's career as a composer, but a transforming event in musical history. Lloyd's career, rooted in an older musical idiom, was by then almost complete and it was left to a younger generation, notably the tenors John Coates and Gervase Elwes, to immortalise both the new dynamic of the music, and themselves, in its full spiritual realisation. Elgar still hoped for Edward Lloyd to appear at a festival at Covent Garden in March 1904, (to include Gerontius, The Apostles and Caractacus) but his wish remained unfulfilled: 'the great man will not emerge'. Instead John Coates took the first two roles and Lloyd Chandos the third.

== Farewell ==
After almost thirty years before the public Edward Lloyd gave his farewell concert at the Royal Albert Hall in December 1900, two months after the Gerontius premiere. Herman Klein said that, like his great predecessor Sims Reeves (who had died in October 1900), although Lloyd was quite unlike him in character of voice and method, both exemplified the purest attributes of the bel canto and upheld the best traditions of the British oratorio school.

Klein thought him more versatile than Reeves, at home in every period and school in music. In Bach and Handel, modern oratorio, Italian aria, Lied, romance and ballad, he was equally capable of arousing admiration: and he could declaim Wagner with a beauty of tone, a fullness of dramatic expression, and a clarity of enunciation that made his German audiences in London shout for very wonder and delight.' Richter considered he was the first tenor to do justice to the Preislied from Meistersinger.

In February 1907 he ceremonially cut the first sod at the site of the Hayes, Middlesex factory of the Gramophone Company, Ltd (later HMV). He emerged from retirement to sing at the Coronation of George V in 1911, and at a Benefit Concert in 1915. He died in Worthing.

== Recordings: Discography ==
The following records were made by Lloyd for the Gramophone Company. They give a fair sample of his ballad repertoire at this date (1904–11), with key representations of his Handel, Mendelssohn, Wagner, Gounod, Balfe and Sullivan. This list is possibly complete.

- 3-2024 I'll sing thee songs of Araby (Clay). 1904
- 3-2025 Tom Bowling (Dibdin). 1904
- 3-2026 The Holy City (Adams). 1904
- 3-2027 The Death of Nelson (Braham). 1904
- 3-2028 Alice, Where Art Thou? (Asher). 1904
- 3-2029 Let me like a soldier fall, Maritana (Wallace). 1904
- 3-2081 When all the world is fair (Cowen). 1904
- 3-2082 The sea hath its pearls (Cowen). 1904
- 3-2083 Then you'll remember me, Bohemian Girl (Balfe). 1904
- 3-2085 If with all your hearts, Elijah (Mendelssohn). 1904
- 3-2086 Lend me your aid, Reine de Saba (Gounod). 1904
- 3-2087 The maid of the mill (Clay). 1904
- 3-2294 Bonnie Mary of Argyle (Landon Ronald, pno). 1905
- 3-2299 The minstrel Boy (Moore).1905
- 3-2801 If with all your hearts, Elijah (Mendelssohn). 1906–07
- 3-2802 Then shall the righteous shine, Elijah (Mendelssohn). 1906–07
- 3-2855 Come, Margherita, come, Martyr of Antioch (Sullivan). 1907
- 3-2856 Awake, awake (Piatti). 1907
- 3-2865 Alice, where art thou? (Asher). 1907
- 3-2870 The song of the south (E Lloyd). 1907
- 3-2889 A farewell (Liddle). 1907
- 3-2922 The sea hath its pearls (Cowen). 1907–08
- 3-2938 Bonnie Mary of Argyle (Nelson). 1908
- 02062 Lend me your aid, Irene (Gounod). 1905
- 02063 Prize song, Meistersinger (Wagner). 1905
- 02087 Fleeting years (Greene). 1907
- 02088 Come into the garden, Maud (Balfe). 1907
- 02090 Sing me to sleep (Greene). 1907
- 02095 I'll sing thee songs of Araby (Clay). 1907
- 02101 The minstrel boy (Moore). 1907
- 02118 (a) Songs my mother taught me (Dvořák),(b) Tune thy strings, o gipsy (Dvořák). 1908
- 02123 Sound an alarm, Judas Maccabaeus (Handel). 1908
- 02139 The star of Bethlehem (Adams) 1908
- 02157 The Holy City (Adams). 1908
- 04792 Rejoice in the Lord (J F Bridge). 1911

== Sources ==
- Bennett, J.R., Voices of the Past: I. A Catalogue of Vocal recordings from the English Catalogue of the Gramophone Company, etc (?Oakwood Press, 1955).
- Bispham, D, A Quaker Singer's Recollections (Macmillan, New York 1920).
- Eaglefield-Hull, A. (Ed), A Dictionary of Modern Music and Musicians (Dent, London 1924).
- Elkin, R., Queen's Hall 1893–1941 (Rider & co, London 1944).
- Elkin, R., Royal Philharmonic: The Annals of the Royal Philharmonic Society (Rider & co, London 1946).
- Klein, H., Thirty Years of Musical Life in London, 1870–1900 (Century Co, New York 1903).
- Santley, C., Reminiscences of my Life (Isaac Pitman, London 1909).
- Scott, M., The Record of Singing to 1914 (Duckworth, London 1977).
- Shaw, G.B., Music in London 1890–1894 (Collected edition, 3 Vols)(Constable, London 1932).
- Shaw, G.B., London Music in 1888–89 as heard by Corno di Bassetto (Constable, London 1937).
- Young, P.M., Letters of Edward Elgar (Geoffrey Bles, London 1956).
- Opera at Home, 3rd edition, reprint with addenda, (The Gramophone Company, 1927).
