= The Barbican Muse =

Sculpture at the Barbican Centre, London, England

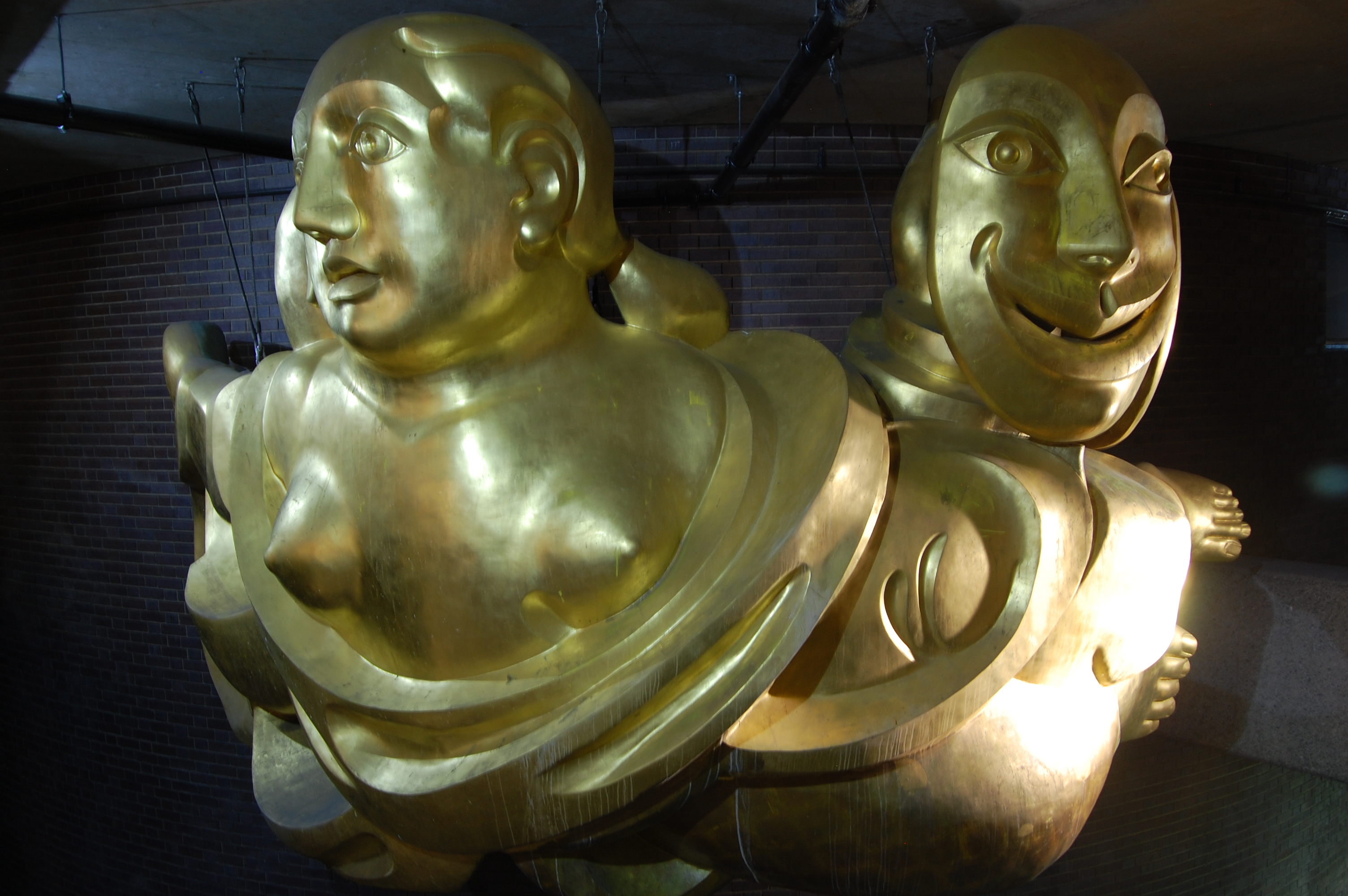
- The sculpture in 2014
- Artist: Matthew Spender
- Year: 1994; 32 years ago
- Type: Sculpture
- Medium: Gilded fibreglass
- Subject: Woman with tragedy and comedy masks
- Dimensions: 6.1 m (20 ft)
- Condition: Good
- Location: London, EC2 United Kingdom; 51°31′11″N 0°05′35″W
- Owner: Dick Enthoven

The Barbican Muse is a sculpture of a woman, holding tragedy and comedy masks, by Matthew Spender, and was installed on a wall near the Silk Street entrance to the Barbican Centre in the City of London, England, in 1994.

The 20 feet (6.1 m) long illuminated sculpture called Muse was cast in fibreglass and then gilded. It was commissioned, in 1993, by architect Theo Crosby to 'float, glow and point the way' to visitors arriving at the centre on the walkway from Moorgate Station.

As part of the 1993–1994 refurbishment, Crosby also commissioned nine gilded fibreglass muses by British sculptor Sir Bernard Sindall, but these were removed in April 1997, and sold to Dick Enthoven in 1998.
