= Janet Monach Patey =

English concert and oratorio contralto (1842–1894)

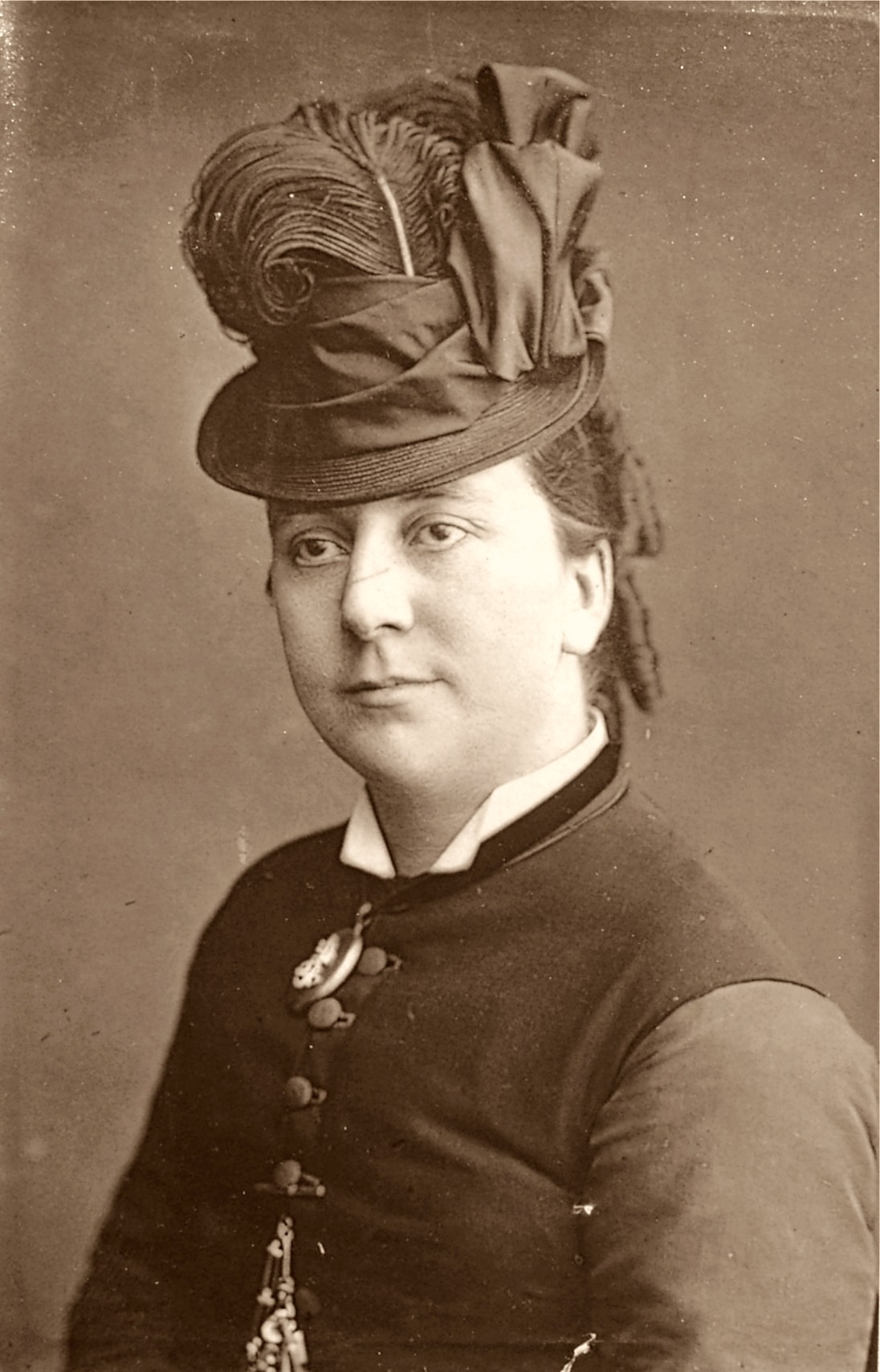
Janet Monach Patey

Janet Monach Patey (née Whytock; 1 May 1842 – 28 February 1894) was an English concert and oratorio contralto.

She was born Janet Monach Whytock in London in 1842. She had a fine alto voice, which developed into a contralto, and she studied singing under John Wass, Ciro Pinsuti and Emma Lucombe (wife of Sims Reeves). Whytock's first appearance, in 1860, was made at Birmingham under the name Ellen Andrews.

Her first regular engagement was in 1865, in the provinces. From 1866, in which year she sang at the Worcester Festival, and married John Patey, a bass singer, she was recognized as one of the leading contraltos; and on the retirement of Helen Sainton-Dolby in 1870 Patey was without a rival whether in oratorio or in ballad music. She toured in America in 1871, sang in Paris in 1875, Australia in 1890, and New Zealand in 1891.

She died at Sheffield on 28 February 1894 and is buried in Brompton Cemetery, London. Her daughter was Ethel Patey, the artist, who under her married name, Ethel Jackson, gave a portrait of her mother to the Tate Gallery.
