= The London Chorus =

The London Chorus is an amateur choir which regularly rehearses and performs in London. It performs a wide range of classical music from well known favourites such as Fauré's Requiem & Elgar's The Dream of Gerontius, lesser known gems including Herbert Howells' Hymnus Paradisi & Alexander L'Estrange's 'Zimbe' and world premieres

In recent years the Chorus has sung with numerous noted soloists including Roderick Williams, Lucy Crowe, Nicky Spence & Katherine Jenkins.

As one of London's leading choirs it frequently performs in the city's most prestigious venues such as the Royal Albert Hall, the Barbican, Royal Festival Hall & Cadogan Hall.

The Chorus has performed internationally conducting tours to South Africa, Italy and Poland.

The Chorus's music director is William Vann. Its patron is the Duke of Gloucester, with Roderick Williams, Mary Bevan and Petroc Trelawny as vice patrons.

== Rehearsals ==
The Chorus rehearses in South Kensington on Tuesday evenings.

== History ==
The London Chorus was founded in 1903 by Arthur Fagge as the London Choral Society. Its first concert was a performance of Sullivan's The Golden Legend in October 1903. The following February the choir gave the second London performance of Elgar's The Dream of Gerontius.

In October 2000, the choir changed its name to The London Chorus, performing its inaugural concert, Delius's A Mass of Life, at the Royal Festival Hall.

In 2012 the Chorus performed at the opening ceremony of the London Paralympic Games. In 2018 they took part in the Festival of Remembrance at the Royal Albert Hall in the presence of Queen Elizabeth II to commemorate the 100th anniversary of the end of the First World War.

Sir Simon Rattle, Dame Jane Glover and Ronald Corp OBE have all previously served as the chorus' Music Director.
