= Ella Russell =

American politician

Ella Mundhenke Russell
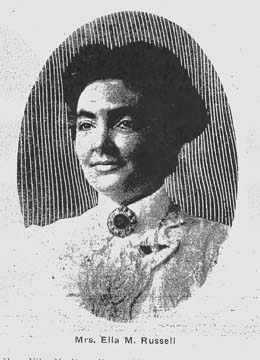
- Ella Russell, 1910
- Born: 1868–1869; Illinois
- Died: 1956
- Occupations: Suffragette, politician

Ella Mundhenke Russell (c. 1868 – March 6, 1956) was an American suffragette, businessperson, and politician. She was president of the Everett Suffrage Club. Russell "famously defended women's right to vote before a crowd of 6,500 during a Billy Sunday crusade", and advanced the women's suffrage cause in the city of Everett and the state of Washington. In 1924, she won the nomination as the Republican candidate for the state senate in her district, but was defeated at the election by a Republican "sticker" candidate.

== Biography ==
Russell was born in Illinois in about 1868, the daughter of Henry and Elizabeth Mundhenke. She had worked as a schoolteacher in Illinois for five years, and in Washington for two years. She married Charles E. Russell, a wood shingle miller, with whom she had four daughters and a son. Russell assisted her husband with the shingle business during his lifetime, and carried on operating the mill after his death in 1925.

== Political career ==
In 1910, Russell was president of the Everett Suffrage Club, which campaigned for the right of women to vote, and for the rights of working women. Under Russell's leadership, the club wrote in the Labor Journal on November 4, 1910: "IF YOU WERE A GIRL WORKER: 'No woman in silks and satins, whose only care is how she may keep her social light burning brighter than her rival's has any right to stand in the way of the rights of the woman who toils.'" Regarding widows with children, it continued: "No woman, whose home interests are well cared for, has any right to stand in the way of the rights of the woman who has carried her mate to the grave."

In the same year, Russell was present at an event organised by the Billy Sunday campaign. One of the women speaking at the event opposed women's vote, saying that "a woman's role was to teach her sons to vote properly." She also claimed that she had been subjected to harassment by the Everett Suffrage Club. Russell asked to speak and when denied, stepped up on a bench and began addressing the crowd, estimated at 5,500 or 6,500 people. Reporting the confrontation, Votes for Women, at that time an official organ for the Washington State Suffrage Association, wrote: "This event became the rallying point of an enthusiasm for suffrage which has put Everett in the forefront of the campaign. Mrs. Russell is resourceful, she has rallied about her many able women and many novel schemes have been devised to further the cause of suffrage in Snohomish and adjoining counties". The Everett Suffrage Club was honored by Votes for Women "for having been one of the most successful clubs in the state in gaining local media attention". Washington state became the fifth in the US to allow women to vote, ratifying Amendment 5 to the state constitution (Amendment to Article VI Sec. 1), granting women the right to vote, on November 8, 1910.

In 1914, Russell stood as a Democratic candidate for the 48th district in the Washington House of Representatives. In 1922, she stood unsuccessfully as a Republican candidate for the House of Representatives in Thurston County. In 1924, she was successful in winning the Republican nomination for the Washington State Senate for that district, defeating the sitting Republican senator, Phillip H. Carlyon, by two votes. Russell had put to Carlyon eleven questions, including one which, reports stated, "caught the public's fancy": "Is it true that since your entry into the legislature of this state, some 18 years ago, you have had no calling or occupation other than political – in other words, no visible means of support?"

Although Russell had won the nomination, Carlyon stood in the election as a "sticker candidate" and won. Russell contested the result, claiming that, having lost the nomination, Carlyon had no qualification to run; that stickers with his name had been placed over Russell's name, so that those intending to vote "straight" Republican voted for him; and that some state employees campaigned for Carlyon. Carlyon filed a protest against the hearing into Russell's complaint. Russell's case was dismissed unanimously, and Carlyon retained the senate seat.

== See also ==
- Women's suffrage movement in Washington (state)
