= Emma Albani =

Canadian-British opera soprano (1847–1930)

Dame Emma Albani DBE
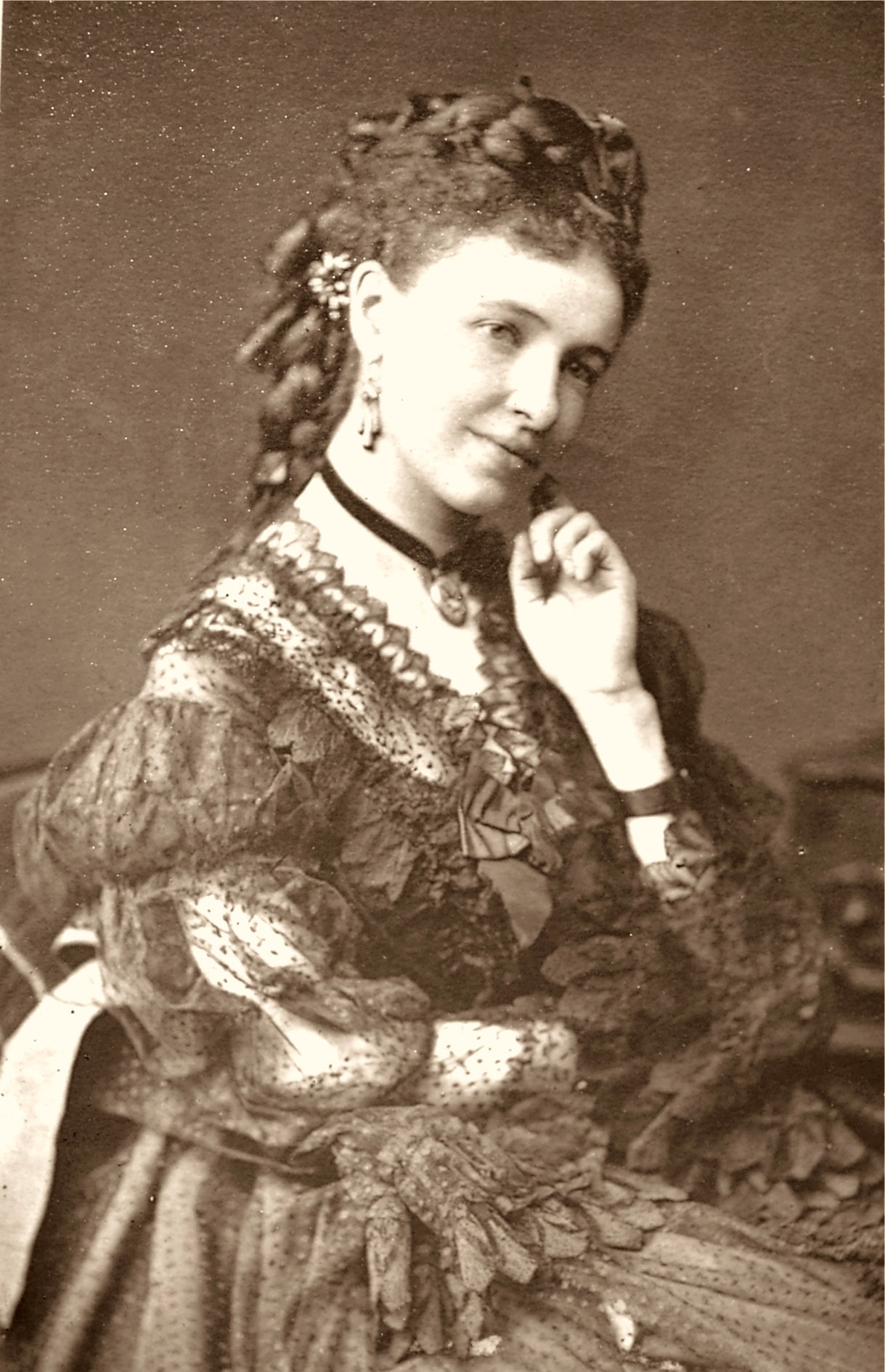
- Born: Marie-Louise-Emma-Cécile Lajeunesse; 1 November 1847; Chambly, United Province of Canada (present-day Chambly, Quebec)
- Died: 3 April 1930 (aged 82); Kensington, London, England
- Occupations: Operatic coloratura soprano, spinto soprano, dramatic soprano
- Spouse: Ernest Gye (m. 1878; died 1925)
- Children: 1 son

Signature
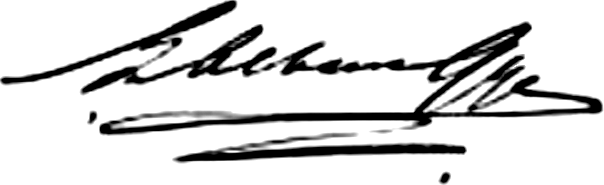

Dame Emma Albani, DBE (born Marie-Louise-Emma-Cécile Lajeunesse; 1 November 1847 – 3 April 1930) was a Canadian-British operatic coloratura soprano, later spinto soprano and dramatic soprano of the 19th and early 20th century, the first Canadian singer to become an international star. Her repertoire focused on the operas of Mozart, Rossini, Donizetti, Bellini and Wagner. She performed across Europe and North America.

== Early life ==
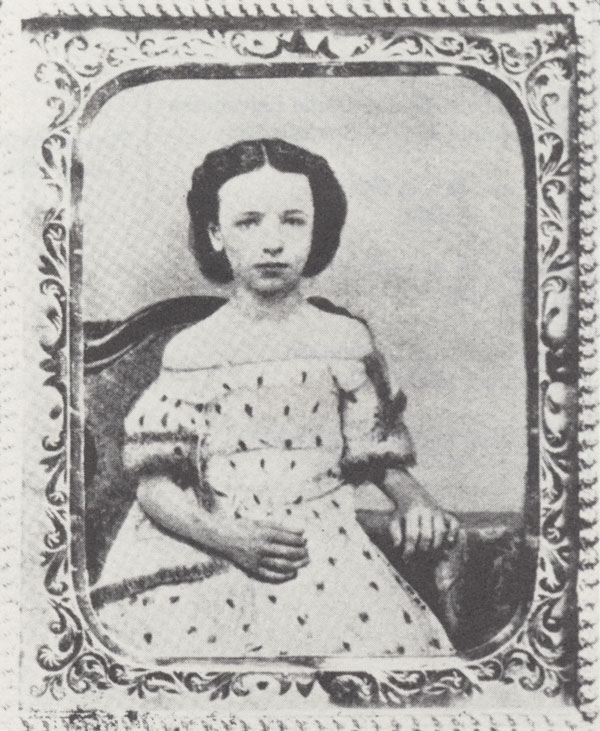
Emma Albani at age 5

Albani was born Marie-Louise-Emma-Cécile Lajeunesse in Chambly, Quebec, to the professional musician Joseph Lajeunesse and his wife, Mélina Mignault. Her parents were French-Canadians. Her date of birth is usually given as 1 November 1847, but other authors have placed her birth in 1848 or 1850, The Biographical Dictionary of America puts her birth on 18 September 1851, Who's Who in America says 1 November 1851, and Albani's memoir says 1852. She began her musical studies with her mother, and at age five her father took over her musical lessons. Her father was a proficient musician who was skilled with the violin, harp, piano and organ. He kept her on a strong practice regimen, with as much as four hours a day of lessons on the harp and piano.

== Emigration and tuition ==
The family moved to Plattsburgh, New York, in 1852. In 1856 after the death of her mother, she continued her education in a Montreal convent-school, run by the Dames du Sacré-Coeur where her father had obtained the position of Music Master. This afforded her a better education than she might otherwise receive, and additional musical instruction. On 24 August 1860 she and Adelina Patti were soloists in the world premiere of Charles Wugk Sabatier's Cantata in Montreal which was performed in honour of the visit of the Prince of Wales. She was also awarded a gold medal for musical composition from that convent. However, she was ultimately unable to finance a musical education in Quebec, where singing and acting were considered unsavoury careers for a woman, and her family moved to Albany, New York in 1865. Her father was unable to give her the training which her very fine voice deserved, but she obtained a place in the cathedral choir, where her singing attracted much attention, as it did in concerts, in which she not only sang but played on both the piano and harp. There she became a popular singer, an organist and teacher of singing and saved enough money to continue her studies.

In 1868, she travelled to Paris, where she studied with Gilbert Duprez at the Conservatoire de Paris. She spent six months in Paris, training with Duprez. She then travelled to Italy, where she studied Italian opera singing with Francesco Lamperti. Under the guidance of her elocution instructor, Signor Delorenzi, she changed her name to the simpler Emma Albani, which sounded more European. She made her debut at Messina using the surname Albani.

== Operatic career ==
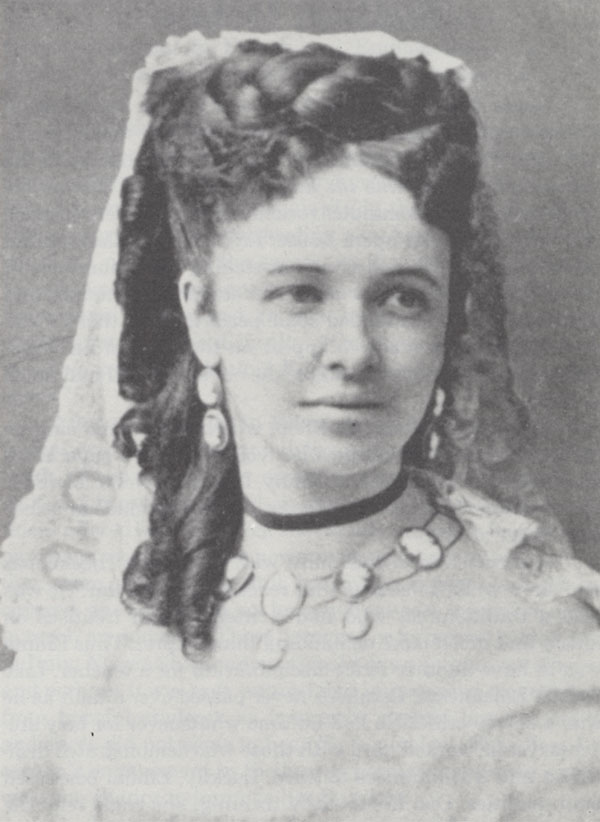
Emma Albani at the time of her debut as Amina

=== Development in Italy ===
Her funds began to run low, and although her training was not yet complete, she began to look for work to help support her schooling. She found a position in Messina, and her operatic debut was on 30 March 1870, in Messina, playing Amina in La sonnambula. Her debut performance was very well received. She later recalled:

I was literally loaded with flowers, presents, and poetry, the detached sheets of which were sent fluttering down in every direction on the heads of the audience; and among the numberless bouquets of every shape was a basket in which was concealed a live dove. They had painted it red, and the dear little bird rose and flew all over the theatre.

— Emma Albani, on her debut performance.

She returned to Milan after her contract in Messina had expired, to resume her instruction by Lamperti. Additional work offers began to pour in. She soon accepted the role of Gilda in Rigoletto, performing it in Cento. Further roles followed in Florence and Malta, with parts in La sonnambula, Lucia di Lammermoor, Robert le diable, The Barber of Seville and L'Africaine. After spending the winter of 1870–1871 performing in Malta, she auditioned for Frederick Gye, the manager of Covent Garden in London. He was impressed by her talent and signed her to a five-year contract. She was scheduled to make her London debut in the spring of 1872. Before her London contract began, she returned to Italy to study with Lamperti at Lake Como, and then appeared at the Teatro della Pergola in Florence, giving one last series of nine performances in ten days in the title role of Ambroise Thomas's Mignon, a part she studied with the composer in Paris prior to her making her debut in the role.

=== Move to London's Covent Garden ===
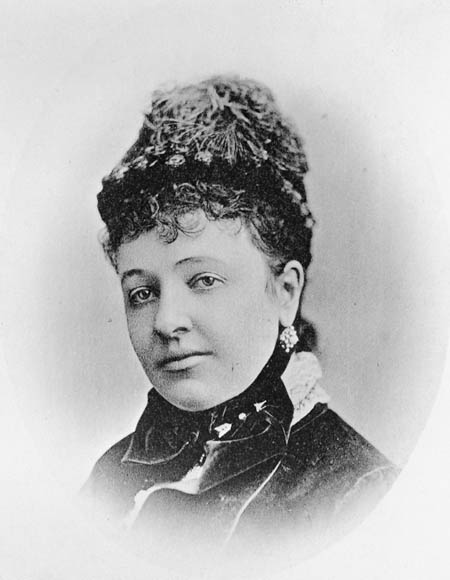
Emma Albani

Albani arrived in London in the spring, and made her professional debut on 2 April 1872 as Amina in La sonnambula. Critics and audience members alike were impressed with her strong performance in the role, and her admirers presented her with flowers and jewellery. At Covent Garden, she developed an interest in oratorio after being introduced to it by Sir Julius Benedict and Josiah Pittman, who encouraged her to explore it. Her first opportunity to present a piece came in October 1872, when she performed "Angels, ever bright and fair" from Handel's Theodora at the Norwich Festival.

For the 1872–1873 winter season, she performed with the Italian Opera at the Salle Ventadour in Paris, where she made her debut as Amina with Victor Capoul as Elvino.

Her second season in London included performances in the roles of Ophelia in Ambroise Thomas' Hamlet and the Countess in Mozart's The Marriage of Figaro. During the off time after the second season she travelled to Moscow to perform in La sonnambula, Rigoletto, Hamlet, and Lucia di Lammermoor. She then went to St. Petersburg, where the Tsar Alexander II viewed her performances.

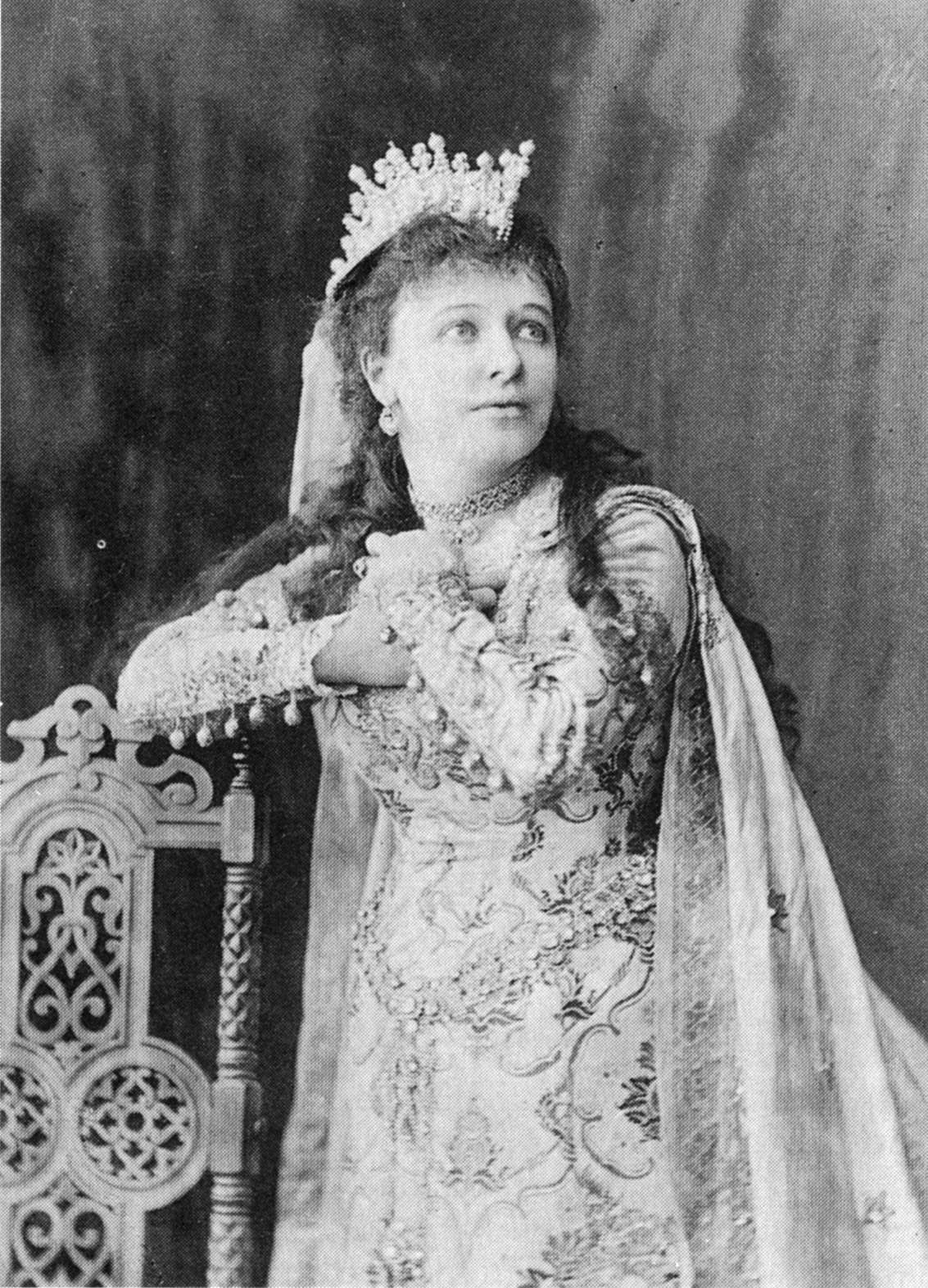
Albani as Elisabeth in Tannhäuser

In her third season in London, she performed in mostly the same roles she had in her first two seasons: La sonnambula, Lucia di Lammermoor, Linda di Chamounix and Martha. The competition in the opera world of London was very stiff, and it was common for performers to be possessive of their roles. After her third season, Queen Victoria requested a private performance from Albani, who travelled to Windsor Castle in July 1874 to perform the aria "Caro nome" from Rigoletto, the folk ballad "Robin Adair", the Bach/Gounod "Ave Maria", and the popular song "Home! Sweet Home!". The Queen was suitably impressed by her performance and would call Albani back to perform other pieces, by composers such as Brahms, Grieg, Handel and Mendelssohn, as well as traditional French and Scottish tunes.

In the fall of 1874, she undertook a tour of the United States, visiting New York, Boston, Philadelphia, Baltimore, Washington, D.C., Chicago and Albany. The tour was under the management of Maurice Strakosch. She was accompanied by Frederick Gye's son, Ernest Gye, who was acting on his father's behalf. She learned the role of Elsa in Wagner's Lohengrin in two weeks, performing it at the Academy of Music in New York. The opera was performed in Italian, which was also the custom at Covent Garden.

She returned to London for her fourth season at Covent Garden in 1875. After the season, she performed at the Norwich Festival, where she sang in Mendelssohn's "Hymn of Praise" Symphony-Cantata and Julius Benedict's oratorio The Legend of St. Cecilia. In her fifth season in London (1876) she performed the role of Elisabeth in the London premiere of Wagner's Tannhäuser.

Afterward she went to Paris and sang at the Théâtre des Italiens, where she was well received, and gave a special performance at the Élysée Palace for Maréchal MacMahon.

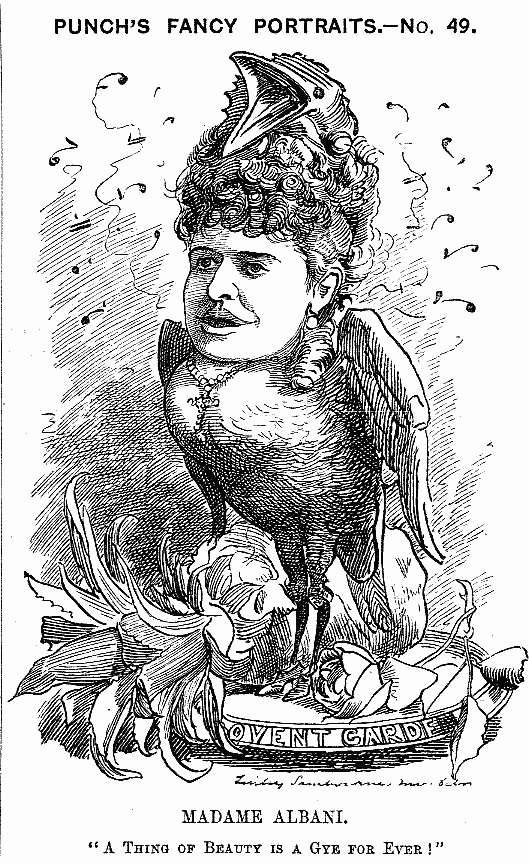
Caricature from Punch, 17 September 1881: "MADAME ALBANI. A Thing of Beauty is a Gye for ever!"

Albani married Ernest Gye on 6 August 1878. She became pregnant, but continued to tour and perform until shortly before the birth of her son, Frederick Ernest Gye on 4 June 1879. He was to be the couple's only child. In the fall of 1879, after singing at the Hereford and Bristol Festivals, she returned to Florence. In January 1880, she sang in Nice, and from there she went to the Théâtre de la Monnaie in Brussels. On 26 June 1880 she performed Isabella in Ferdinand Hérold's Le pré aux clercs at Covent Garden, a production that was mounted especially for her.

Throughout the 1880s, Albani toured Europe and North America, garnering praise wherever she travelled. In 1881, she was invited to perform in Lohengrin, which was being given at the Berlin Royal Opera. She agreed to appear in the role of Elsa, which she had previously sung in Italian, and relearned the part in German. The performance was attended by Kaiser Wilhelm I. The reception was very positive, earning three curtain calls. In 1882, Kaiser Wilhelm I awarded her the title of Hofkammersängerin.

In 1883, she gave three recitals in Montreal. More than ten thousand people showed up to greet her upon her arrival, and at a reception the poet Louis-Honoré Fréchette read a poem that he had written in her honour. Her first operatic performance in Canada came on 13 February 1883 in Toronto, at the Grand Opera House where she performed in Lucia di Lammermoor. On 15 July 1884 in London she sang the role of Brunehild in Ernest Reyer's opera Sigurd and the role of Juliette in Gounod's Roméo et Juliette in the same season.

=== Performances with New York's Metropolitan Opera ===
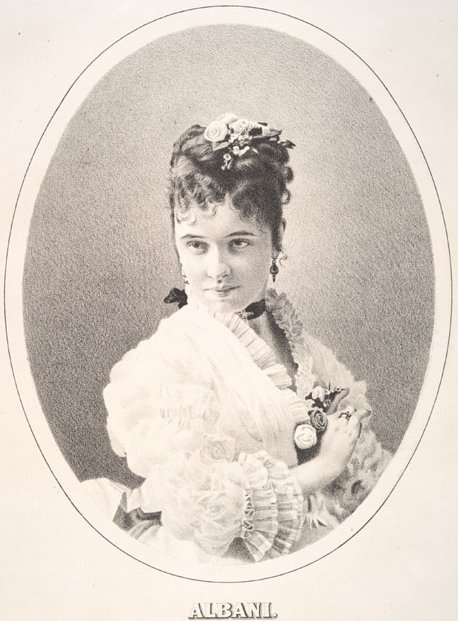
Emma Albani in costume for the role of Violetta in La Traviata

Albani made her debut with New York's Metropolitan Opera on 20 November 1891 as Valentine in Meyerbeer's Les Huguenots, a performance which took place while the company was on tour in Chicago. Her second appearance in Chicago on 23 November was as Desdemona in the company's first ever performance of Verdi's Otello, and she also sang the role there at a gala performance of Act 4 on 9 December. Other appearances with the Met in Chicago included another as Valentine, Gilda in Rigoletto, Violetta in Act 1 of Verdi's La traviata (on a double bill with Mascagni's Cavalleria rusticana, in which Emma Eames's sang Santuzza) and Elsa in Wagner's Lohengrin. Her first appearance with the company in New York was as Gilda in Rigoletto on 23 December.

Further performances in New York included four appearances as Valentine (a role she also performed on tour in Louisville, Albany, Brooklyn, Philadelphia, and Boston), three as Donna Elvira in Mozart's Don Giovanni, three as Eva in Wagner's Die Meistersinger von Nürnberg, one more as Gilda, one as Desdemona, one as Elsa, as well as a single appearance as Marguerite in Gounod's Faust. She also sang Donna Elvira and Eva on tour in Boston. Her final appearance with the Met was in New York on 31 March 1892, as Senta in The Flying Dutchman. All the operas in which she appeared were sung in Italian. In total she had performed 29 times with the company. As the season progressed, some critics remarked on the wear and tear that was becoming evident in her voice, but praised her artistry and experience. Of her last performance at the Met, The New York Times wrote: "The Senta of Mlle. Albani was not vocally perfect, yet it had so many excellences that her hearers must have been inclined to forgive the departures from the pitch which seem to have become an inseparable accompaniment of her singing of late. She did much to atone for them by the intelligence of her work and by the dramatic earnestness with which she imbued all her singing. She earned a fair share of the honors of the evening."

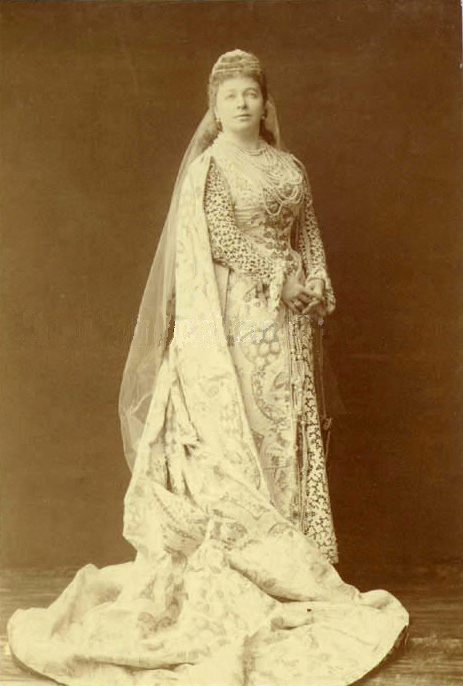
Albani as Desdemona

=== Final season at Covent Garden ===
Even in Albani's final season at Covent Garden in 1896, she continued to receive strongly positive reviews. The greatest triumph of her career came on 26 June 1896, when she sang Isolde in Wagner's Tristan und Isolde, with Jean de Reszke in his first London Tristan, Louise Meisslinger as Brangäne, David Bispham as Kurwenal, Édouard de Reszke as King Marke, and Luigi Mancinelli conducting. There were a total of four performances, all of which sold out despite the higher than normal ticket prices and the oddity that the opera was sung in German. On 24 July she sang Valentine in Les Huguenots. There had been no announcement, and few people would have realized it was the last time they were to hear her in opera. Her career at Covent Garden had lasted for twenty-four years.

=== Post Covent Garden ===
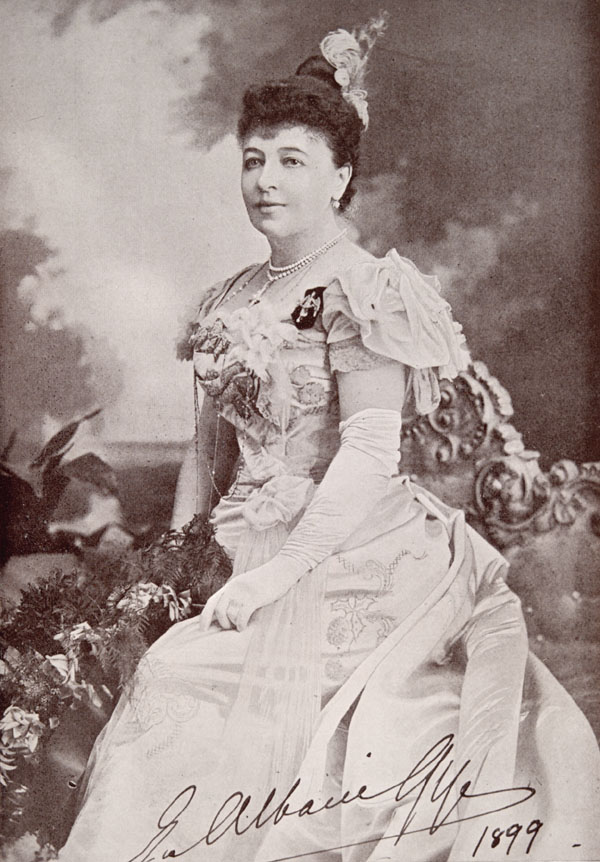
Emma Albani in 1899

After retiring from Covent Garden in 1896, Albani departed for a tour of Canada, performing in venues across the country. In 1898, she toured Australia. .She also was active in oratorio in Britain.

"Madam Albani gave her farewell concert" at the Albert Hall in London, in 1900. (The London Encyclopedia, First published 1983 by Macmillan London).

In 1907, Albani toured Australia[41] and New Zealand .[42] In spring 1908, the veteran Albani toured the English provinces as part of a company containing two budding talents: pianist Marie Novello, who two years later would become one of Theodor Leschetizky's last students, and John McCormack, who only months before had made his own Covent Garden debut.[43] Albani gave her last public performance on 14 October 1911.[44] That same year she released a book, Forty Years of Song.[45] The book was effectively a memoir, recounting stories of her youth, travels and career, and impressions of fellow performers and the royalty she met over her life, as well as providing some useful advice on singing.[46]

She and her husband retired to Kensington. Poor investments resulted in the loss of much of their wealth, and Albani was forced to give musical lessons to earn income. Her husband died in 1925, compounding the situation, but benefit concerts arranged by friends provided sufficient income for Albani. She died on 3 April 1930, aged 82, at her home on Tregunter Road, Kensington and was buried with her husband at Brompton Cemetery.

== Honours and legacy ==
Albani received the gold medal of the Royal Philharmonic Society in 1897, often known as the "Beethoven Medal". Madame Selitsky, the prima donna who performs in Lucy Maud Montgomery's Anne of Green Gables (1908) was inspired by Albani. Montgomery later wrote a profile of the singer for Courageous Women (1934), a non-fiction work. In 1925, Albani was made a Dame Commander of the Order of the British Empire.

The Historic Sites and Monuments Board of Canada mounted a plaque at her birthplace in 1939. It was replaced with a stele in 1977.

Several streets and places have been named after her in Quebec. Two streets in Montreal have been named in her honour. The first, rue Albani, was dedicated in 1912. It disappeared when road construction merged it with another street. The second, avenue Albani, was named 19 March 1969 by the city's council. In 1980 Canada Post commissioned a postage stamp honoring her on the 50th anniversary of her death. The stamp was designed by artist Huntley Brown, portraying her in costume as Violetta from the opera La Traviata. It is a colourised version of the adjacent image.

In the 1990s, the former mayor of Chambly, Robert Lebel donated the Emma Albani fund for musical arts to the town.

Albani is depicted in a stained-glass mural by Frédéric Back in the Place-des-Arts metro station in Montreal.
