= Emma Fursch-Madi =

French operatic soprano

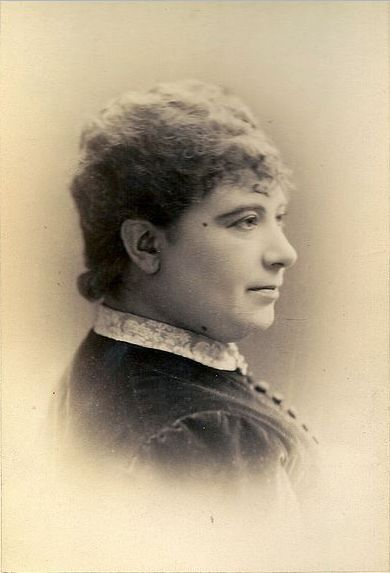
Emma Fursch-Madi

Emma Fursch-Madi, also given as Emmy Fursch-Madi, (1847 – 21 September 1894) was a French operatic soprano. She was born in Bayonne, France, and studied at the Paris Conservatory and made her debut at the Paris Opera in 1871 in Gounod's Faust. At the end of her second season at the Grand Opera, she was chosen by Verdi to be the first representative of Aida in Europe. It opened at the Theatre Royal in Brussels and was a great success, running for 72 straight performances.

In 1879, Fursch-Madi appeared at the Covent Garden, and the London Globe called her "…greatest dramatic prima donna of the present day." In 1882, she came to the United States, where she appeared under the management of James Henry Mapleson at the Academy of Music in New York City. She performed for the first season of the new Metropolitan Opera House in New York in 1883–84. She became a permanent fixture in various musical capacities in the United States; she was for a while the head of Jeannette Thurber's National Conservatory, and a member of the short-lived American Opera Company. Her last appearance was as Ortrud in Wagner's Lohengrin on 6 February 1894, at the Metropolitan Opera in New York. She died at her home in the Warrenville section of Warren Township, New Jersey.
