= Leopold Lichtenberg =

American violinist

Leopold Lichtenberg (November 22, 1861 – May 16, 1935) was an American violinist.

== Biography ==
Lichtenberg was born in San Francisco, California to Jewish parents. Lichtenberg studied under Beaujardin, and made his first appearance in concert when eight years of age. In his twelfth year, he was asked by Henryk Wieniawski, then on a visit to California, to become his pupil. He accompanied Wieniawski on a tour through America. Some time afterward he spent six months in Paris under Lambert, and then rejoined Wieniawski at Brussels Conservatory, where he studied unremittingly for three years. After winning a prize at a national competition held in Belgium, he made a successful tour through the Netherlands.

Upon his return to America he played with Theodore Thomas' orchestra in New York City, and gave a number of recitals in other cities. After spending three years more in Europe, Lichtenberg gave another series of concerts in America, after which he settled for some time in Boston, Massachusetts, as a member of the Boston Symphony Orchestra (BSO). He next went to New York City to take charge of the department of violin at the National Conservatory. His fine technique and beautiful tone entitled him to high rank among violinists.

In December 1889 he was a soloist with the BSO under Arthur Nikisch for the grand opening of Lincoln Music Hall in Washington, D.C.

With pianist Adèle Margulies and cellist Leo Schulz, he formed the Margulies Trio, which became one of the foremost chamber music organizations of the United States. Lichtenberg died in Brooklyn, New York City, in 1935.
