= Gustav Hinrichs =

American conductor and composer

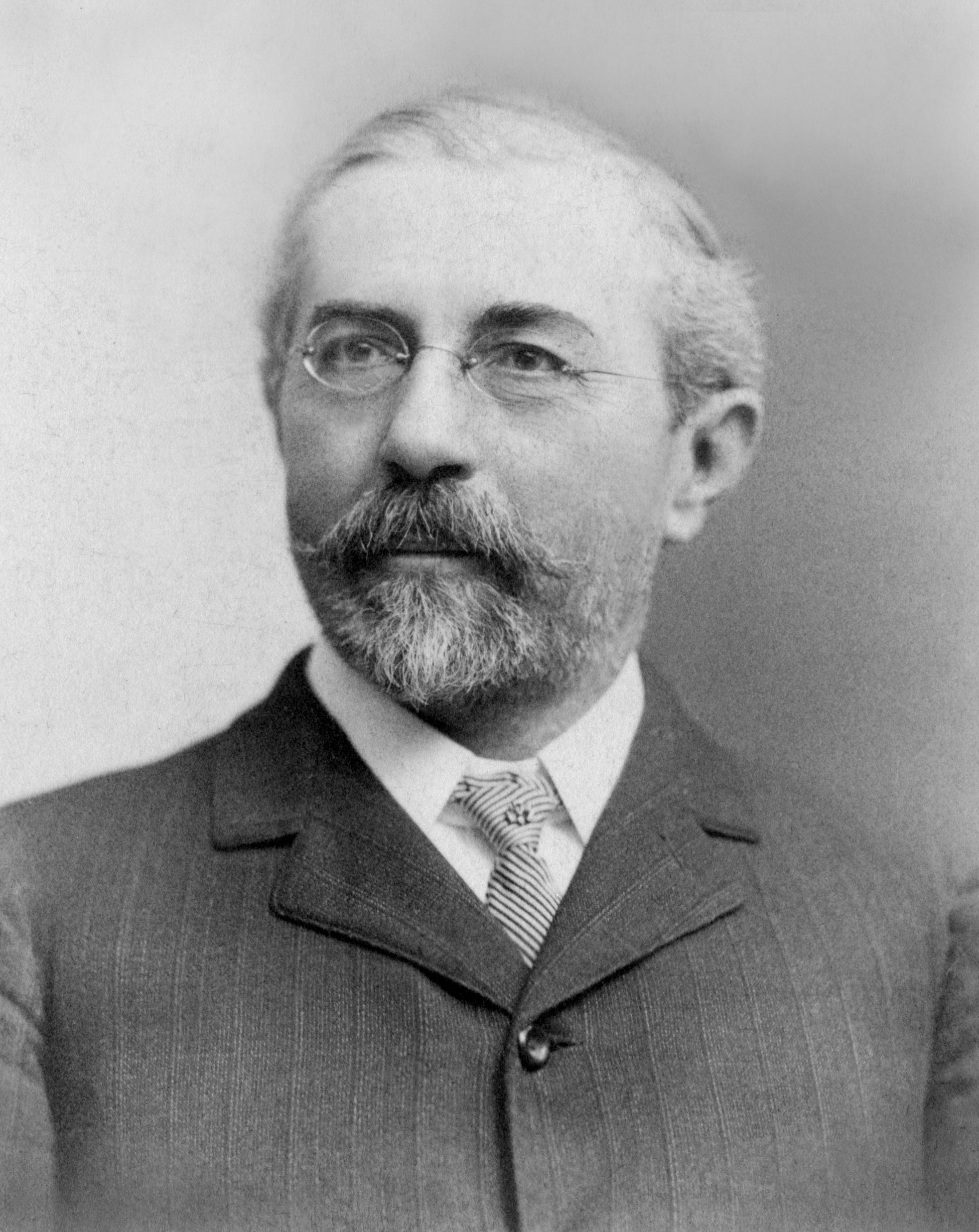
Gustav Hinrichs in New York, c. 1895–1905 (Photo Aimé Dupont)

Gustav Ludwig Wilhelm Hinrichs (10 December 1850 – 26 March 1942) was a German-born American conductor and composer. He immigrated to the United States at the age of 19, where he became known especially as a conductor of opera in San Francisco, New York, and Philadelphia. His compositions include four operas, many songs and instrumental works, and musical scores for silent films, including the 1925 version of The Phantom of the Opera.

== Career ==
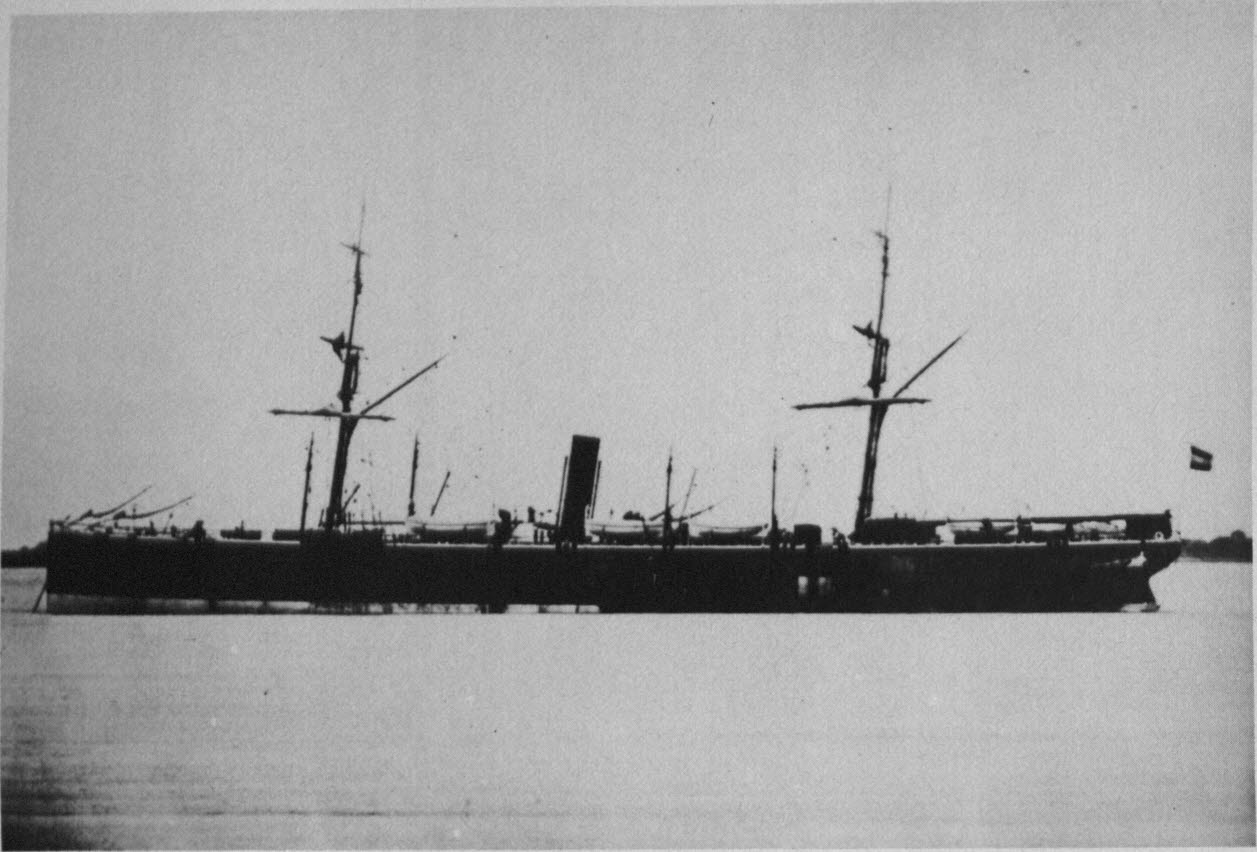
The Silesia (in service 1869–1887) on which Hinrichs arrived in the United States

Gustav Hinrichs was born in Grabow near Ludwigslust, Germany to August Hinrichs and Sophie née Havekoss. He studied clarinet, violin, and piano with his father, and composition with Angelo Reisland and Eduard Marxsen in Hamburg. While still a teenager he began playing with the Hamburg State Opera orchestra.

At the age of 19, in order to avoid military service, Hinrichs emigrated to the United States. He sailed from Hamburg via Le Havre on SS Silesia and arrived in New York on 4 April 1870. He then traveled by train across the continent to San Francisco, where friends of his parents lived, arriving on 6 May 1870.

In San Francisco Hinrichs quickly found work as a musician. He gave piano lessons, played the organ at St. Mark's church, conducted for several choral societies, and began his long association with the opera house as conductor of the Fabbri Italian and German Opera Company, the Emily Melville Opera Company, and the Tivoli Opera Company. Among the light operas performed (in English) by the Melville company under Hinrich's direction during these years were those of Franz von Suppé, including Boccaccio and Fatinitza, which were sent by Suppé's librettist, Richard Genée, to his sister Ottilie Genée, who lived in San Francisco and who arranged for their translation and production. In October 1880, Hinrichs conducted the Grand Military Band at the Authors' Carnival given for the Associated Charities of San Francisco, an event attended by President Rutherford B. Hayes and General William Tecumseh Sherman, among others. In 1881 he founded the San Francisco Philharmonic Society, precursor of the San Francisco Symphony. The first concerts of the newly established orchestra received mixed reviews, with some criticism of both the programs and the playing.

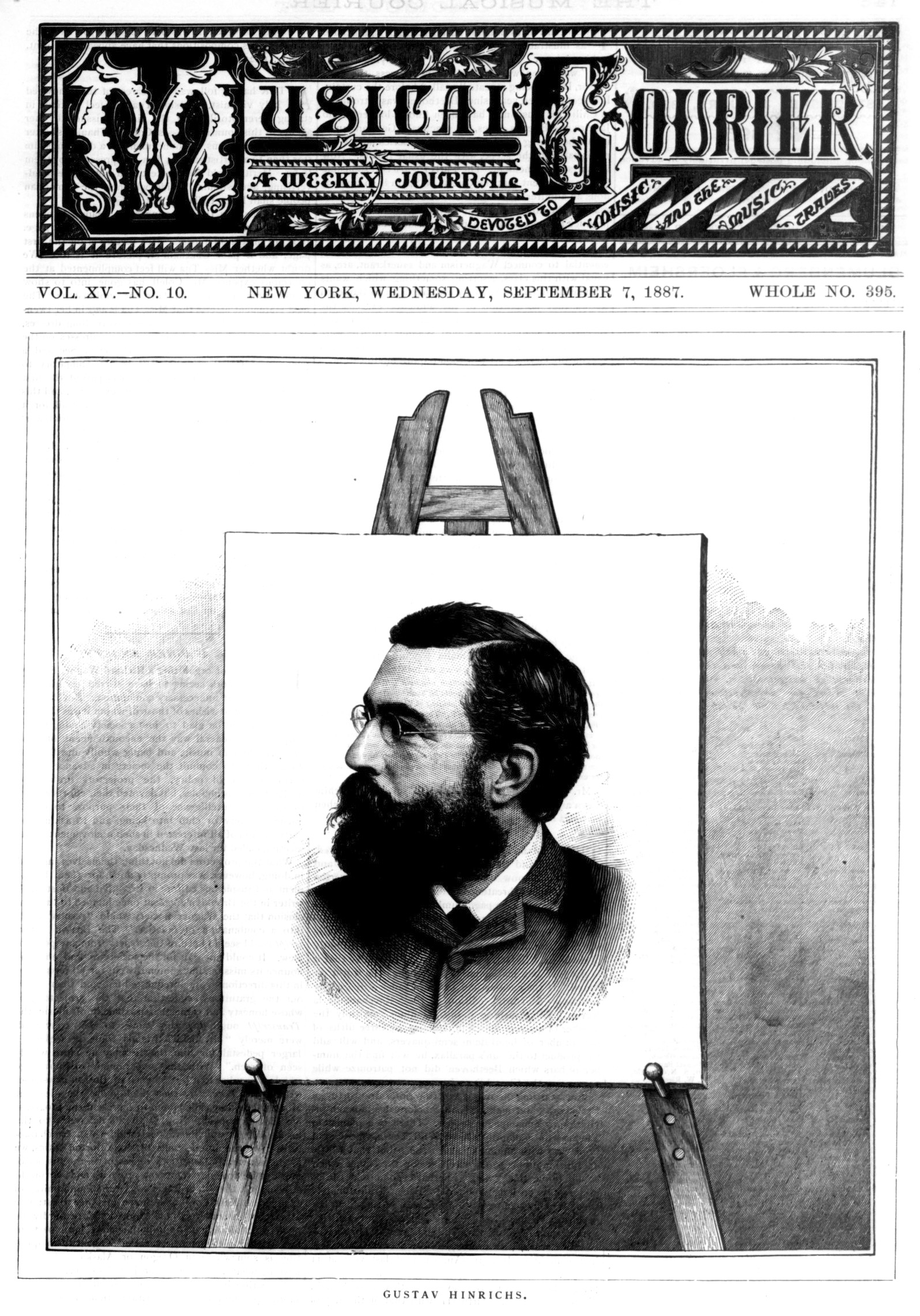
Hinrichs on the cover of The Musical Courier in 1887

In 1885, Hinrichs moved to New York to become assistant conductor of the short-lived American Opera Company under director Theodore Thomas. The company, funded by New York patron of the arts Jeannette Thurber, was created to expand appreciation of opera in America by performing German and Italian works in English translation and at affordable prices. It had an ambitious schedule of performances, with productions of 14 different operas in its first season, and toured to cities in the Midwest and even as far as California. Although it was a critical success, financial difficulties led to a reorganization and change of name (to the National Opera Company) in 1886, and the experiment ended in lawsuits and recriminations the following year.

In 1888, Hinrichs moved to Philadelphia at the invitation of brewer John Betz, who had just constructed a new musical theater in that city, the Grand Opera House, and was looking for an opera company to perform there. To meet the need, Hinrichs founded his own opera company, known at different points in its history as the National Opera Company, the American Opera Company, and the Gustav Hinrichs Opera Company. The company opened the Grand Opera House on 9 April 1888 with a performance of Wagner's Tannhäuser, and survived for nine seasons, performing in the Grand Opera House and the Academy of Music in Philadelphia, as well as in Boston and New York. Among its notable productions were the first American performances Mascagni's Cavalleria rusticana (9 September 1891) and L'amico Fritz (8 June 1892), Bizet's Les pêcheurs de perles (23 August 1893), Leoncavallo's I Pagliacci (15 June 1893), Puccini's Manon Lescaut (29 August 1894). During this time he also conducted occasional symphony concerts at the Academy of Music.

Between 1895 and 1906 Hinrichs taught at Columbia University and the National Conservatory in New York. In 1896 he returned to San Francisco for another season as director of the Tivoli Opera Company, and also conducted the orchestra of the San Francisco Symphony Society (later the San Francisco Symphony Orchestra). He conducted at the Metropolitan Opera in New York during the 1899–1900 season, including performances of Gounod's Faust (19 October 1899) in New York and Rossini's Il Barbiere di Siviglia (14 October 1899) while the company was on tour in Syracuse, New York, and he returned to the company again for the 1903–1904 season.

From October 11 to October 16, 1909, he conducted La Loie Fuller and the Muses at the National Theatre, Washington, D.C.

== Compositions ==
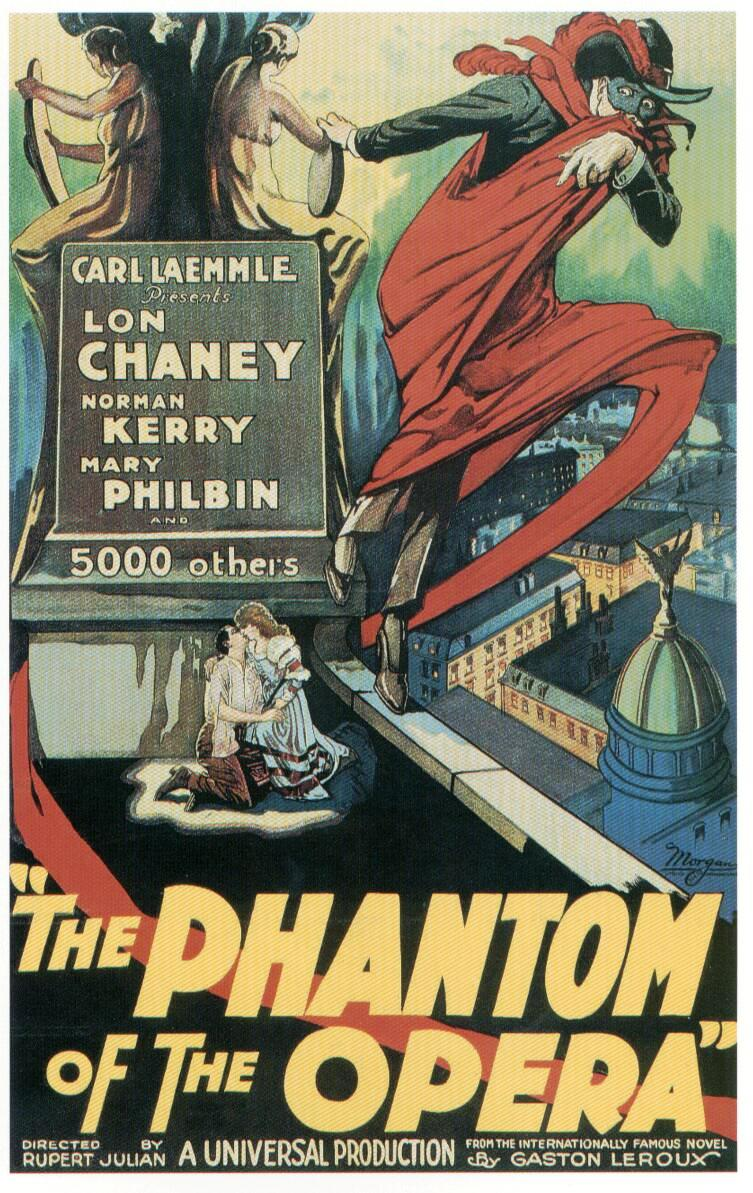
The Phantom of the Opera, poster

Two of Hinrichs's operas were produced during his lifetime. The first, Der Vierjährige Posten, based on a poem by Theodor Körner, was performed in April 1877 in San Francisco. The second, Onti-Ora, received six performances in Philadelphia in July and August 1890. The libretto was by Mary B. M. Toland, based on a long narrative poem of her own set in the Adirondacks and originally published in 1881. The opera received mixed reviews: the conventional melodramatic plot was much criticized, but most critics admired Hinrichs's musical contribution, and the production as a whole was praised for being a distinctly American work. Two other early operas, Malvina and Die Frauenverschwörung, were apparently never performed.

In addition to his operas, Hinrichs composed many songs and choral pieces, as well as a number of instrumental and orchestral works. Some of his compositions were published either Germany or the United States, and the manuscripts of many others are preserved in the Gustav Hinrichs collection of the Museum of Performance and Design in San Francisco. He was also a prolific arranger of the works of others, many of which were published by the Schirmer company.

In the 1920s, Hinrichs wrote and arranged orchestral accompaniments for silent films produced by Universal Studios, including a score for the 1925 version of The Phantom of the Opera, starring Lon Chaney. The score was not ready for the premiere but was completed in time for its general release.

== Private life and family ==
Hinrichs was a naturalized American citizen, a lifelong Lutheran, and a Democrat. He was married twice. His first wife was Henrietta von Pfersdorf, daughter of San Francisco merchant Theodor von Pfersdorf. They were married in 1873 and had four children: Henrietta, August, Bertha, and Hugo. In 1897, after Henrietta's death, he married contralto Katherine Fleming, who had performed many times with his company in Philadelphia. They had two daughters, Irene and Julia.

In the 1920s Hinrichs retired to Mountain Lakes, New Jersey, where he continued to teach, and where he died on 26 March 1942.

Gustav's brothers, Julius and August Hinrichs, were a cellist and violinist respectively, and both lived and played in the San Francisco Bay Area. Julius died in 1888 at the age of 32, but August had a long career as leader of the Baldwin Theatre orchestra in San Francisco and Ye Liberty Playhouse orchestra in Oakland, among others.

== Sources ==
- "Art and Artists: The Philharmonic Concerts". The Californian. 5 (4): 381–382. April 1882.
- Blake-Alverson, Margaret (1913). Sixty Years of California Song. San Francisco.
- Carr, Bruce (1992). "Hinrichs, Gustav (opera)". Grove Music Online (8th ed.). Oxford University Press. ISBN 978-1-56159-263-0. (subscription, Wikilibrary access, or UK public library membership required)
- Cohen, Rube (29 August 1908). "San Francisco Letter". The Billboard. 20 (35): 10.
- Hinrichs, Gustav (1914). National Hymns, Songs, and Patriotic Airs of All Countries. New York: G.Schirmer.
- "Hinrichs, Gustav". The National Cyclopaedia of American Biography. Vol. 38. New York: James T. White and Co. 1953. pp. 574–575.
- "Personals: Julius Hinrichs". The Musical Courier. 17 (450): 220. 26 September 1888.
- Krehbiel, Henry E. (1908). Chapters of Opera. New York: Henry Holt..
- Ottenberg, June C. (Spring 1999). "Gustav Hinrichs and Opera in Philadelphia, 1888—1896". Opera Quarterly. 15 (2): 196–223. doi:10.1093/oq/15.2.196.
- Ottenberg, June C. (2001). "Hinrichs, Gustav". Grove Music Online (8th ed.). Oxford University Press. ISBN 978-1-56159-263-0. (subscription, Wikilibrary access, or UK public library membership required)
- Pratt, Waldo Selden; Boyd, Charles N., eds. (1920). Grove's Dictionary of Music and Musicians. Vol. 6: American Supplement. New York: Macmillan.
- Rubin, Emanuel (1997). "Jeannette Meyer Thurber (1850–1946): Music for a Democracy". In Locke, Ralph P.; Barr, Cyrilla (eds.). Cultivating Music in America: Women Patrons and Activists. Berkeley: University of California Press. pp. 134–163. ISBN 0520083954.
- Slonimsky, Nicholas; Kuhn, Laura; McIntire, Dennis (2001). "Hinrichs, Gustav". Baker's Biographical Dictionary of Musicians. Vol. 3 (8 ed.). New York: Schirmer. p. 1572.
- Toland, M. B. M. (1881). Onti Ora: A Metrical Romance. Philadelphia: Lippincott.
