= Morris Arnold =

Morris Arnold may refer to:

- Morris F. Arnold (1915–1992), American Episcopal suffragan bishop in Massachusetts
- Morris S. Arnold (born 1941), retired American appeals court judge

== See also ==
- Maurice Arnold (1865–1937), composer
