= Helene Mullins =

American poet

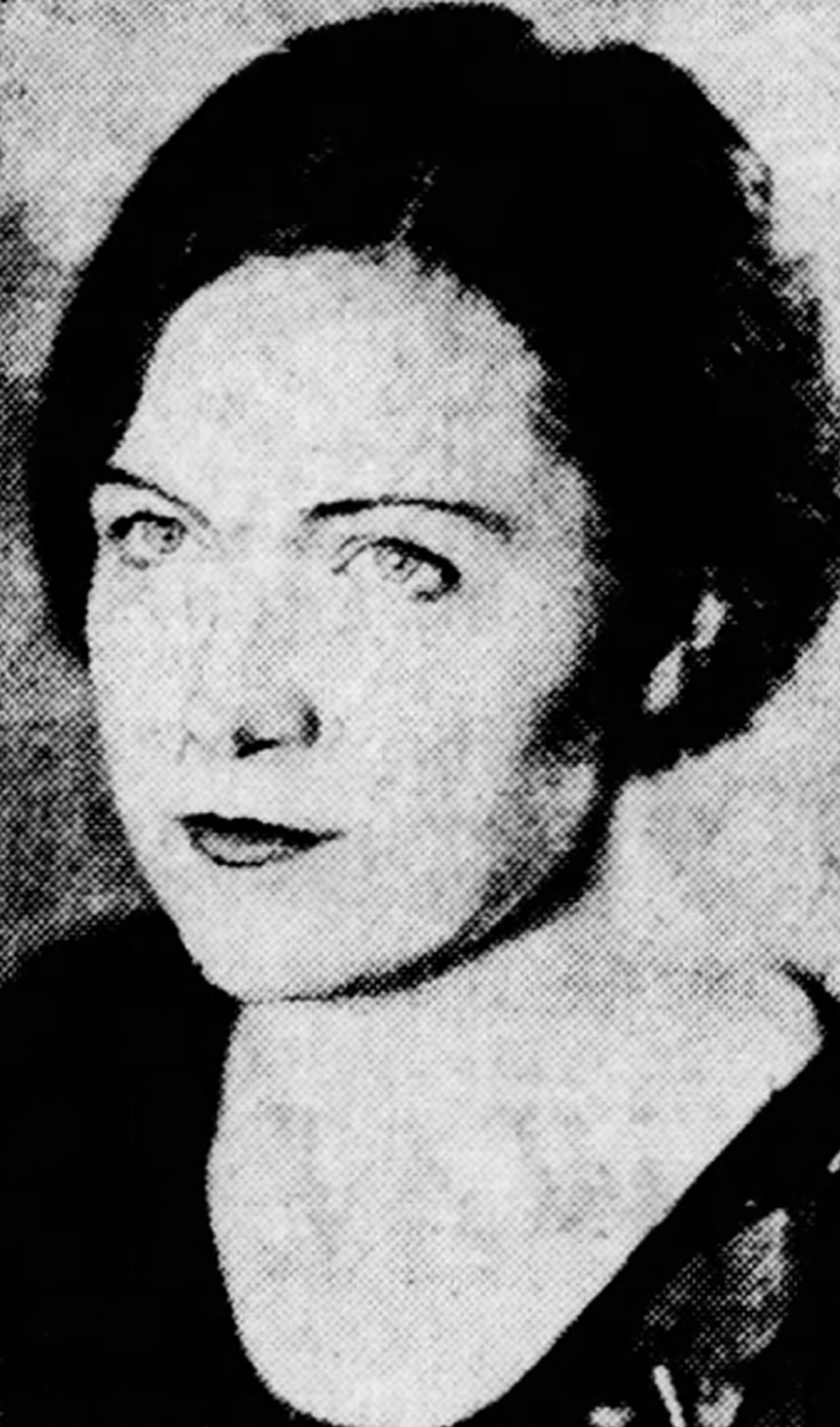
Helene Mullins, portrait from the early 1920s.

Helene Mullins (July 12, 1899 - October 26, 1991) was an American poet whose work appeared frequently in magazines and newspapers across the United States during the 1920s and 1930s. Much of it was syndicated through Franklin Pierce Adams' Conning Tower column published in the New York World newspaper.

She Marvels Over What They Say

"It cannot last," they said to me,
When I with Love went dancing.
"The end is always ruthlessly
And quietly advancing."
But I knew better, being young.
And I would not endeavor
To understand a dismal tongue;
My dance would last forever.
Now that with Pain I’m lying prone,
"It cannot last," they tell me,
And in a calm and soothing tone
Endeavor to compel me
To be assured the end will come.
But though it chafe or grieve them,
I find their comfort wearisome;
I still do not believe them.

Mullins published four collections of poetry: Earthbound and Other Poems (1929), Balm in Gilead (1930), Streams from the Source (1938), and The Mirrored Walls and Other Poems (1970).

She authored two novels early in her career: Paulus Fy: the History of an Aesthete (1924), co-written with her sister, Marie Gallegher, and Convent Girl (1929).

Mullins' work was included in Modern American Poetry: A Critical Anthology by Louis Untermeyer in 1930.

Helene Mullins (née Gallegher) was born in New Rochelle, New York. Aside from some time spent in Hollywood, Santa Fe, and Washington DC, the poet lived most of her adult life in New York City. Mullins was married twice, first to Ivan Mullins in 1920, and then to Linné Johnson in 1958.

Helene Mullins' poetry has been compared to that of Christina Rossetti. Her writing was compact, intense, lyrical, and often spiritual. Mullins wrote in a somewhat old-fashioned style for her time, but her poetry nonetheless had a modern sensibility, and it was accessible to the wide audience it reached in Scribner's Magazine, The Atlantic Monthly, The New Yorker, and in wide syndication through the New York World newspaper.

In 1927, Mullins was commissioned by the American Opera Company, along with The New Yorker music critic Robert A. Simon, to create a new English libretto for Carmen. The opera's new libretto was performed widely across North America over the next few years.

In 1935, Mullins suffered serious injuries when she was struck by a car while crossing the street. She was in a coma for several weeks, and she took several years to recover.

Helene Mullins died in 1991, in Manhattan, at the age of 92.

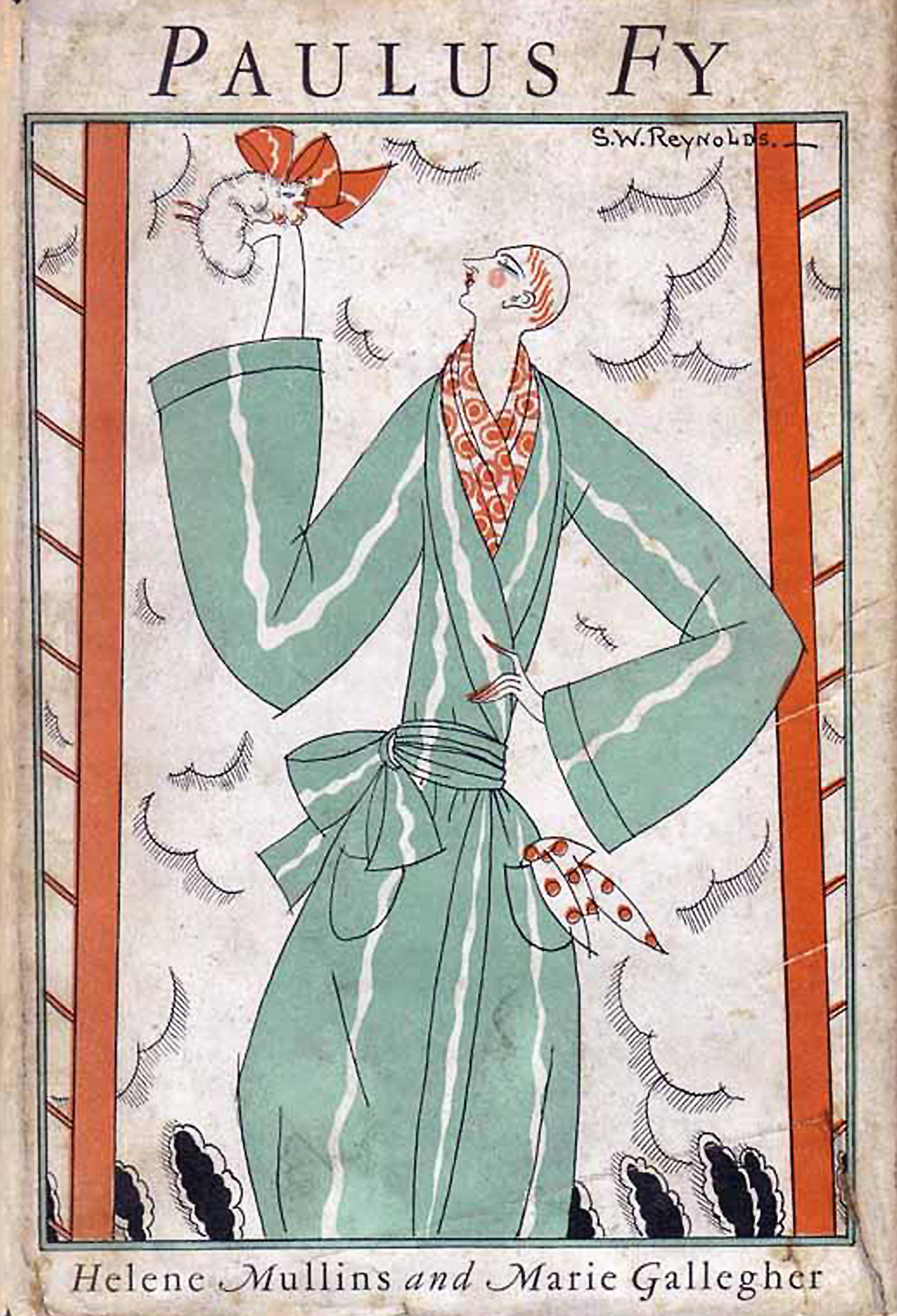
Paulus Fy - A novel, published in 1924.
