= Irénée Berge =

French composer, conductor and instructor

Irénée Bergé
- Born: February 1, 1867; Toulouse, France
- Died: July 30, 1926 (aged 59); Jersey City, New Jersey, US
- Occupation: Composer
- Known for: Music for Silent films

Irénée Bergé (February 1, 1867 – July 30, 1926) was a French composer, conductor and instructor who lived in the United States. In spite of confusions between his given name and "Irène", Bergé was male.

== Early life and career ==
According to one source he was born in Toulouse although other sources say Paris. He attended the Conservatoire de Paris where he studied with Jules Massenet and Théodore Dubois. While under Massenet's tutelage, he and other of the composers' students purchased a gift for the opera singer Sibyl Sanderson, who rewarded them by making a personal visit and sang an excerpt from the opera Esclarmonde with the composer at the piano. "The students were spellbound...never had they enjoyed their professor's opera so much, and never had they heard such artistic singing." Although not mentioned in his obituaries, Berge apparently also was a tenor. In an 1897 performance of Berlioz's L'enfance du Christ, a reviewer noted "Irénée Bergé, a young tenor of excellent schooling, whose voice—though not too powerful—had a very agreeable timbre, and a very distinguished [performance]. He and that of the orchestra....had a grand success."

Before immigrating to the United States he was an assistant conductor at Covent Garden. At the invitation of Jeannette Thurber Bergé came to New York in 1902 to teach at the National Conservatory of Music of America.

== Work in the United States ==
He wrote two operas, Corsica and Nicolette (one source includes an opera titled The Knave of Hearts). Corsica was written to a libretto by Frederick F. Schrader. It had its premiere in the week prior to November 13, 1910 on a bill with Joseph Carl Breil's opera Love Laughs at Locksmiths (also with a libretto by Schrader) in Kingston, New York, as part of Breil's touring opera company. A 1915 announcement indicated that Corsica "has been just acquired for London and was scheduled for production in the spring."

In 1915 he wrote the song "Blue Bonnet" (with lyricist George Sloan Bryan) and entered it in a contest for the Texas state song.

Bergé is known for composing many silent film music cues. These were not written for a specific film but as generic pieces appropriate to the mood of the specific scene.

He had been living at 35 Van Wagenen Avenue, Jersey City, New Jersey, when he died on July 30, 1926. He was survived by his wife Jeanne.

== Partial list of works ==
=== Vocal ===
- Les Nymphes d'Artémis
- Le gente meunière (L. Gregh) (for tenor and bass)
- Le joyeux pêcheur (L. Gregh) (for tenor and bass)
- Berceuse bretonne (Leduc)
- Chanson de mousse (Baudoux)
- Chanson de vendanges (Fromont)
- Chansons des champs (Baudou) (8 songs)
- Le chanson du chevalier (Ondet)

=== Operas ===
- Corsica (1910)
- Nicolette

=== Chamber ===
- Nocturne (string quartet, harp and flute)

=== Piano ===
- Capriccio (Badoux)
- Chant d'Amour (Bryant)
- Le Cyprin, étude fantaisie (Baudoux)
- Danse hongroise
- Dormez ma mie
- Ecoutez chanter les Pinsons (Weiller)
- En Mai, valse de salon
- Eté
- Les fleurs et l'aimée
- Gavotte in G major
- Gerbe des roses, mazurka (Weiller)
- Impressions d'été
- Impromptu-valse
- La machine à coudre, morceau caractérisique (Fromont)
- Mazurka de concert (Leduc)
- Minuet in A Major
- Mes baisers sont des papillons
- La mouche, fantaisie
- La nuit descent des cieux
- Le papillon, méditation
- Plaintive Chanson (Bryant)
- La Promenade de la Merveilleuse - The Coquette (Bryant)
- Rêve d'amour
- Réveil
- Sérénade espagnole
- Six dances anciennes
- Sonnet
- Valse de l'abeille (Ricordi)
- Vous, souvenez-vous (Fromont)

=== Film music ===
- Affection
- Agitated hurry
- Agitated hurry no. 2
- Agitato: anxious expectation
- Andante cantabile
- Andante pathetique
- Appassionato dramático
- Astir
- Chant erotique
- Comic misterioso
- Continuous motion
- Dramatic andante
- Dramatic lamento
- Dramatic reproach
- Furioso
- Hurry
- Misterioso
- Oriental
- Storm scene
- Tragic scene
