= Leon Rains =

American operatic bass and actor

- Born: Eleazer Leon Rains; October 1, 1870; New York City, U.S.
- Died: June 11, 1954 (aged 83); Los Angeles, California, U.S.
- Education: National Conservatory in New York
- Occupations: Operatic bass; Film actor; Voice teacher
- Organizations: Dresden Court Opera

Eleazer Leon Rains, also Léon Rains, (October 1, 1870 – June 11, 1954) was an American operatic bass, film actor and voice teacher. After studies in New York City and Paris, he toured in the U.S. for two years with Frank Damrosch's opera troupe and with Nellie Melba. From 1899, he was based at the Dresden Court Opera, with performances in world premieres such as Salome, and guest appearances in Europe, including the Bayreuth Festival, and at the Metropolitan Opera. When the United States entered the World War in 1917, he returned home, where he worked in concert and as a voice teacher. He also appeared as an actor in silent films.

== Life ==
Rains was born in New York City. As a child, he sang as a choirboy in the choirs of Calvary Church and the Church of the Incarnation in Manhattan. At the age of twelve, he first appeared on stage, of the New York Star Theatre.

Rains studied at the National Conservatory in New York in 1890, which he left as a prize student, a pupil of Oscar Saenger. He studied further from 1896 in Paris with Jacques Bouhy. First he worked as a concert and oratorio singer in America. He made his operatic debut in 1897 with Frank Damrosch's troupe, appearing at the Metropolitan Opera in New York City, and touring the U.S. to 1899. There he acted as a serious bass, singing his roles in Italian, German, French and English, always in the original language of the operas. U.S. critics at the time described him as the most promising bass singer since Karl Formes. He also performed as an assistant artist on a U.S. tour of Nellie Melba.

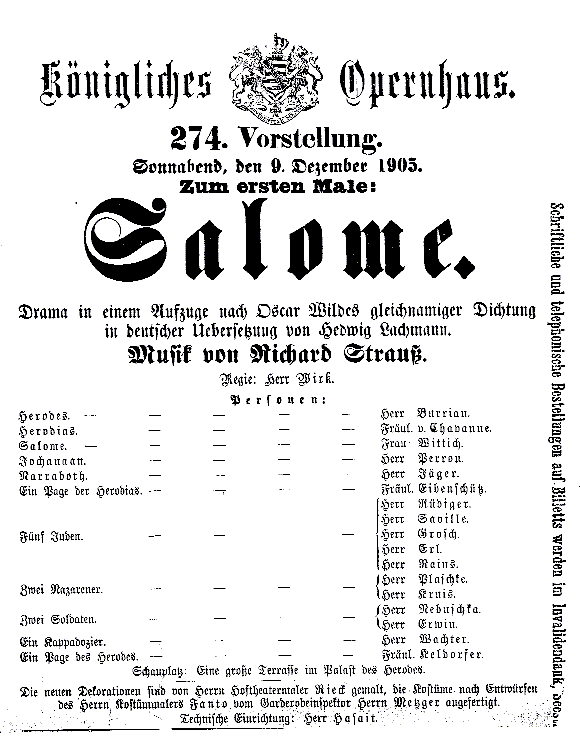
Playbill of Salome, 1905

On June 4, 1899, he appeared first as a guest at the Semperoper, the court opera of Dresden, in Wagner's Tannhäuser, and remained there until 1917. In Dresden, he took part in several world premieres, including Salome by Richard Strauss, and gave guest performances in Berlin, Vienna, Prague and at the Oper Frankfurt, among others. In 1904, he appeared at the Bayreuth Festival as Hagen in Götterdämmerung. In 1909 and 1910, he was a guest at the Metropolitan Opera, where he appeared as Hagen and as Méphistophélès in Gounod's Faust, among other roles.

From 1916 to 1918, he appeared as an actor in several silent films, including five films as the detective Joe Jenkins in a film series.

With the entry of the United States into the World War in 1917, Rains was forced to leave Germany for the U.S.. Back home, he worked again as a concert singer, especially a lieder singer. From 1924, he lived as a voice teacher in Los Angeles. He also worked as an art furniture carpenter.

His voice was described as a particularly beautiful bass voice, especially in the higher register; he was also praised for his phrasing and nuance.

Rains died in Los Angeles at the age of 83.

== Recordings ==
Rains took part in an early recording of the second act of Tannhäuser, dated variously to 1909 and 1913, with an excerpt reissued in a collection America’s Singers Recorded – The First Generation in 2009. An excerpt from Lohengrin, recorded in 1905, is part of a collection Richard Wagner on Record – Historische Aufnahmen aus den Jahren 1903–1946.

== Filmography ==
- 1916: Die Gräfin Heyers
- 1916: Kismet
- 1917: Der Mann mit den vier Füßen
- 1917: Die Harvard-Prämie
- 1917: Die Botschaft des Jean Battista
- 1917: Unheilbar
- 1918: Die schwarze Kugel
- 1918: Der Star der großen Oper.
