= Helen Olheim =

American opera mezzo-soprano (1904–1992)

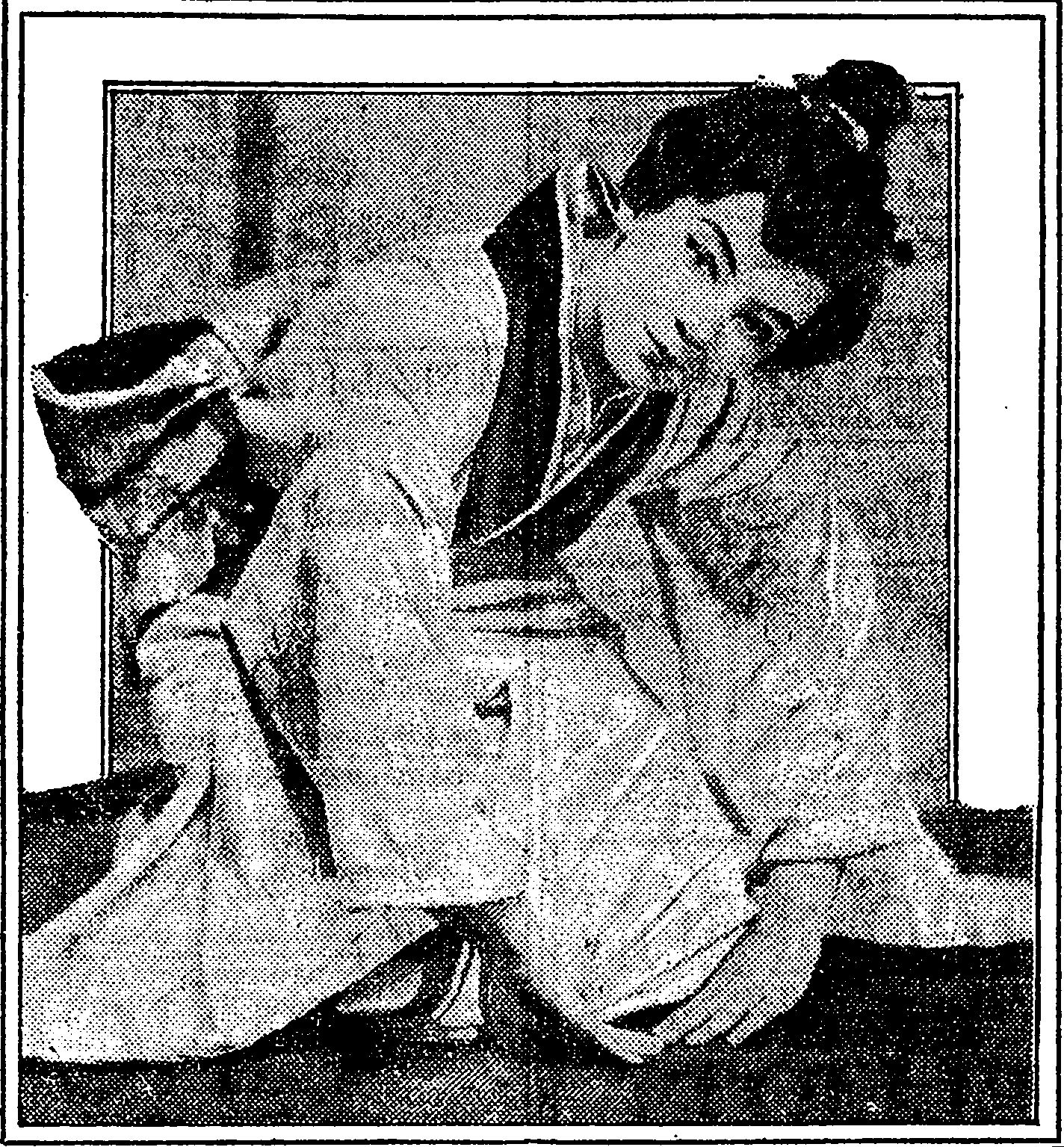
Olheim in 1928 as Suzuki in Madama Butterfly

Helen Olheim (1904 – June 26, 1992) was an American mezzo-soprano opera singer. She was born in Buffalo, New York, in 1904 as Helen Oelheim. She graduated from the Eastman School of Music where Adelin Fermin was her teacher. She sang with the American Opera Company where she met her future husband, Frederick Michel, whom she married in September 1927. Olheim was a guest on many radio programs including The Cathedral Hour on WABC (now WHSQ), and was a member of the Metropolitan Opera from 1935 until 1944 where she appeared in 360 performances. Among the roles she played at the Met were Mercédès from Bizet's Carmen, Siebel from Gounod's Faust. (her debut role at the Met), Maddalena from Verdi's Rigoletto, and Suzuki from Puccini's Madama Butterfly.

Olheim was a Member Laureate of the fraternity for music professionals Sigma Alpha Iota.

After Olheim (which was her stage name) left the Metropolitan Opera, she taught at Mount Holyoke College from 1954 until 1966, and then she moved to Sarasota, Florida. Olheim died June 26, 1992, from natural causes at the Beneva Nursing Pavilion in Sarasota at the age of 87.
