= Marie Decca =

19th-century American opera singer (born 19th-century)

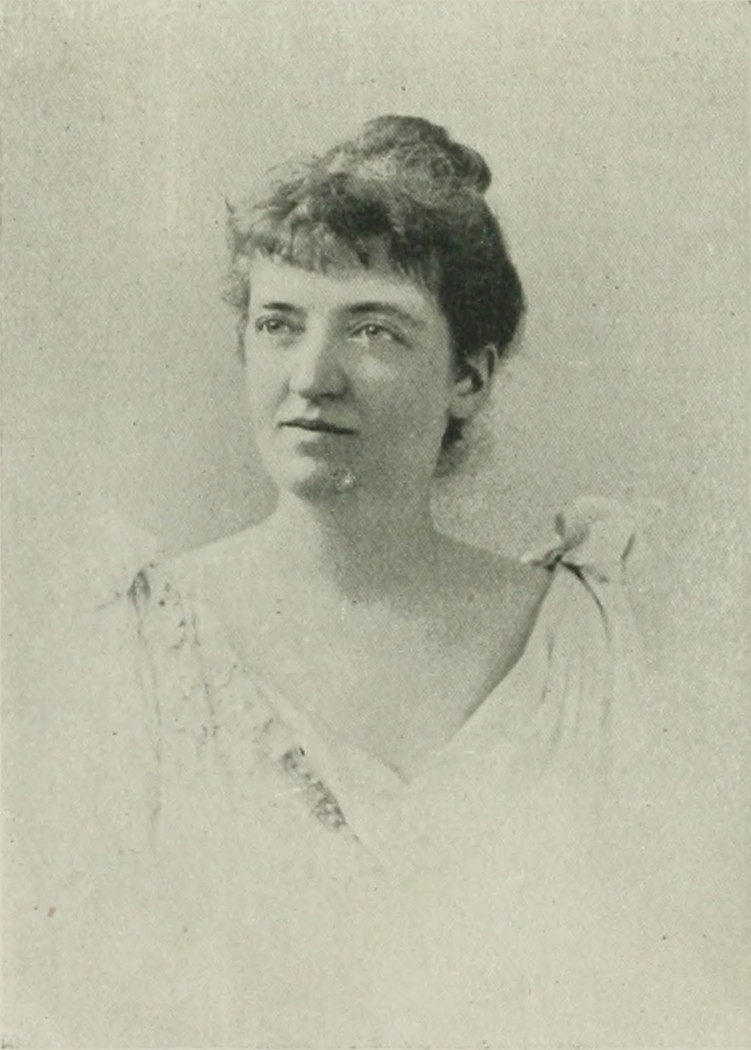
- Portrait photo from A Woman of the Century
- Born: Mary Sanders Johnston; Unknown; Georgetown, Ohio, U.S.
- Died: Unknown
- Other name: Marie Decca
- Occupation: Operatic lyric soprano
- Spouses: Francis Leon Chrisman (m. 1892); Charles McCauley Smith (m. 1896)

Marie Decca was the stage name of Mary Smith (née Johnston; after first marriage, Chrisman; after second marriage, Smith; unknown – unknown), an American lyric soprano operatic singer. She became known as the "Jenny Lind of America". Loomis (1898) described her voice as having the remarkable range of three octaves, reaching to the phenomenal pitch of A natural in alt, while Willard & Livermore (1893) described her as a soprano of flexible and remarkable range, reaching F natural, with exquisite tone and strength. Her stage name was rendered as her veritable cognomen was Johnston, but Johnston and Italian don't mix well. So her music teacher made her sing a piece beginning d, e, c, c, a, and that "deccarated" her with a mellifluous name.

== Early life and education ==
Mary Sanders Johnston was born in Georgetown, Ohio. According to her passport issued on 26 October 1888 she was born on 25 January 1865. She was the only daughter of Judge Sanders Walker Johnston and Amanda Malvina née Hamer, of Washington, D.C., and a granddaughter of General Thomas L. Hamer, who served in the Mexican–American War. Mrs. Johnston was of Scotch descent. Much of Smith's early life was spent in Maysville, Kentucky.

Smith was educated in the Sacred Heart Convent in New York City, and later studied music in Philadelphia, Pennsylvania. During her school years, Smith had a preference and great fondness for the stage, and she would have made it her profession, had not her friends strongly opposed her.

While studying in Philadelphia, Smith saw and heard Etelka Gerster, and Gerster heard her sing in Donizetti's Daughter of the Regiment. Gerster was delighted and exclaimed: "An Italian voice and an American girl!" Gerster advised Smith to go to Paris and take a thorough course, which she did for four years, under the tuition of Blanche Marchesi. Out of a class of sixteen, "John", as the pupils called her, was the only one who finished the course. Marchesi often said to Smith: "You have a well-fed voice, and it is good care, plenty of sleep and beefsteak, Marie, that gives you the advantage of all these extra half-hours."

== Career ==
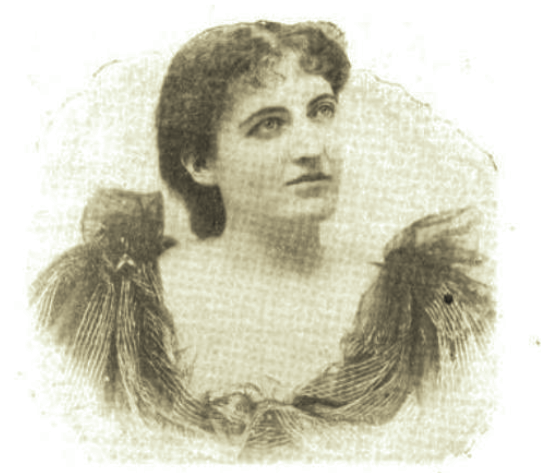
Decca in 1898

Decca made her debut in London at the Covent Garden Theatre, and her success was instantaneous. She was at once engaged by Colonel James Henry Mapleson to appear as the Queen of the Night in Mozart's The Magic Flute, and scored a great success. She subsequently performed for two seasons with Her Majesty's Italian Opera throughout Great Britain and Ireland. Her Italian, French and English repertoire consisted of thirty-four operas, which include the title roles in Donizetti's Lucia di Lammermoor and Linda di Chamounix, Bellini's La sonnambula, Dinorah, and Lakmé by Leo Delibes. She also performed as Ofelia in Hamlet by Ambroise Thomas, Gilda in Verdi's Rigoletto, Marguerite in Gounod's Faust, in Auber's Fra Diavolo, Rosina in Il Barbiere di Siviglia, Norina in Donizetti's Don Pasquale, Cherubino in Mozart's The Marriage of Figaro, as Philine in Mignon by Thomas "Mignon", and as Oscar in Verdi's Un ballo in maschera. Decca sang one season with the Carl Rosa Opera Company.

Decca was very successful in concerts and festivals in England and France; her performance in Europe in 1886 were characterized as "triumphant". In December 1889 she was a soloist with the Boston Symphony Orchestra under Arthur Nikisch for the grand opening of Lincoln Music Hall in Washington, D.C. Her first appearance in Boston, on February 5, 1891, at the Operatic Festival in the Music Hall, was also a triumph, the press being unanimous in enthusiastic admiration of Decca's wonderful execution.

As "Nellie Marie Decca", she was successful at the great Chautauqua Assembly in 1891, receiving the beautiful "Chautauqua Salute" from ten thousand people. Since then, she was engaged by the leading Chautauqua assemblies all over the U.S. Decca accompanied the United States Marine Band on its concert tour through the country in 1891. She accompanied them again in 1892 on their Western tour, and created a furor in every city, her reception on the Pacific Coast being a continuous ovation. Her singing engagements in 1892 also included Cincinnati and Pittsburgh. The Legislatures of two different States, Ohio and Kentucky, adjourned for the purpose of listening to Decca's singing.

Decca was a member of the Daughters of the American Revolution.

== Personal life ==
On January 27, 1892, she married Francis Leon Chrisman, newspaper correspondent. They met in 1891 at Chautauqua Lake, when Chrisman was reporting the Assembly proceedings for a New York paper, and Decca was engaged in singing for the attendees. On July 19, 1893, Decca started a suit against her husband, charging him with purloining her property.

After divorcing Mr. Chrisman, she married secondly, on April 23, 1896, Charles McCauley Smith. They had a daughter, Marie Marchesi Smith.
