= Robert A. Simon =

American novelist (1897–1981)

Robert Alfred Simon (1897 in New York City – 27 April 1981 in New York City) was an American writer, translator, and music critic for The New Yorker from its first issue in 1925 until 1948. A graduate of Columbia University, in addition to his original fiction he wrote opera and musical comedy librettos for several composers. In 1927 he penned a widely praised English translation of Gounod's Faust as well as new librettos for Carmen and The Abduction From the Seraglio for Vladimir Rosing's American Opera Company.

His writing varied in subject from social criticism (Our Little Girl) to detective fiction (The Weekend Mystery) to the satire of artists and musicians (Sweet & Low, published under the pseudonym Liggett Reynolds).

== Selected works ==
=== Books ===
- Our Little Girl (1923)
- The Week-end Mystery (1926)
- Sweet & Low: A Smashing Indictment of the Younger Generation (1926)
- Bronx Ballads (1927) [Editor]
- The Pamphlet Poets: The New York Wits (1927) [Editor]

=== Translations ===
- Fräulein Else (1926) by Arthur Schnitzler
- Faust (1927) by Johann Wolfgang von Goethe, opera libretto by Jules Barbier and Michel Carré.
- The Abduction for the Seraglio (1928) by Gottlieb Stephanie.
- Carmen (1928) by Henri Meilhac and Ludovic Halévy. Translated in collaboration with poet Helene Mullins.

=== Librettos ===
- The Swordsman (1927) musical play based on The Three Musketeers by Alexandre Dumas, père composed by Louis E. Gensler
- Maria Malibran (1935) opera composed by Robert Russell Bennett
- Garick (1937) opera composed by Albert Stoessel
- Beauty and the Beast (1937) opera composed by Vittorio Giannini
- Rehearsal Call (1962) opera composed by Vittorio Giannini
- Count Ory: a comic opera in two acts (1963) composed by Vittorio Giannini

== Sources ==
- New York Times, Obituary: Robert Simon, Writer, Librettist And New Yorker Music Critic, 84, 28 April 1981

Preceded by None	Music Critic of The New Yorker; 1925–1948	Succeeded by Winthrop Sargeant
