= Carl Adolph Preyer =

German-American pianist, composer, and music instructor

Carl Adolph Preyer (né Karl; 28 July 1863, Pforzheim, Baden-Württemberg – 16 November 1947, Lawrence, Kansas) was a German-American pianist, composer, and music instructor. Preyer was the son of Jean Preyer and Marie Heinz. He became interested in learning the piano that encouraged himself to pursue further into studying music. Before he settled in the US in 1893, his music instructors were Karel Navrátil, Heinrich Urban, and Heinrich Barth. His piano compositions include sonatas, etudes, and sketches as well as songs for both voice and piano.

== Legacy ==
The Crafton-Preyer Theatre in the University of Kansas was named after Carl Adolph Preyer when he joined the university as a professor of piano and composition in 1893, the same year he settled in the US, and later became the associate dean of the School of Fine Arts in 1915.

Preyer was the piano instructor for the American pianist, Allen Rogers (8 July 1925 – 23 May 2003).
