= Winthrop Sargeant =

American music critic and violinist (1903–1986)

- Born: December 10, 1903; San Francisco, California
- Died: August 15, 1986 (aged 82); Salisbury, Connecticut
- Occupations: Music critic, violinist
- Spouse: Jane Smith Sargeant

Winthrop Sargeant (December 10, 1903 – August 15, 1986) was an American music critic, violinist, and writer.

== Early life ==
Sargeant was born in San Francisco, California on December 10, 1903. He studied violin in his native city with Albert Elkus, and with Felix Prohaska and Lucien Capet in Europe.

== Career ==
In 1922, at the age of 18, he became the youngest member of the San Francisco Symphony. He left there for New York City in 1926 where he became a violinist with the New York Symphony from 1926 to 1928 and later the New York Philharmonic from 1928 to 1930.

He abandoned his performance career in favor of pursuing a career as a journalist, critic, and writer in 1930. He wrote music criticism for Musical America, The Brooklyn Daily Eagle, and The New York American.

He was notably a music editor for Time magazine from 1937 to 1945, and he served as a senior writer for Life magazine from 1945 to 1949. In 1940, William Saroyan lists him among "contributing editors" at Time in the play, Love's Old Sweet Song.

From 1949 to 1972, he wrote the column Musical Events for The New Yorker. He continued to write music criticism for that publication until his death in 1986 at the age of 82. His books included Jazz: Hot and Hybrid (1938), Geniuses, goddesses, and people (1949), Listening to music (1958), Jazz: a history (1964), In spite of myself: a personal memoir (1970), Divas (1973).

=== Other scholarship ===
Sargeant had a long-standing interest in the Bhagavad Gītā. Sargeant published his own English translation of the Bhagavad Gītā in 1979.

== Personal life ==
Sargeant died at his home in Salisbury, Connecticut on August 15, 1986. He was survived by his wife, Jane Smith Sargeant, and his brother, Emmet Sargeant.

Preceded by Robert A. Simon	Music Critic of The New Yorker; 1949-1972	Succeeded by Andrew Porter
