= Bhagavad Gita (Sargeant) =

The Bhagavad Gita
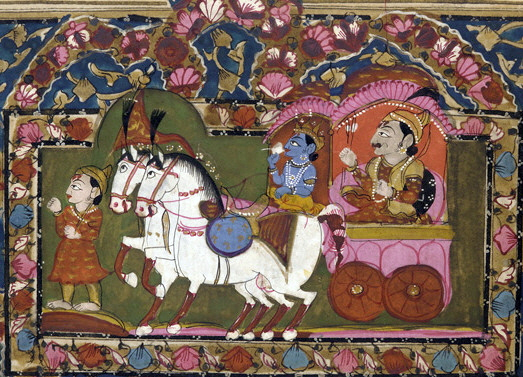
- The setting of the Bhagavad Gita: Krishna and Arjuna at Kurukshetra, 18–19th century painting.
- Author: Winthrop Sargeant
- Language: English
- Publisher: SUNY Press (1984, 2009)
- Publication date: 1979; 1984; 2009
- Pages: 739
- ISBN: 978-1-4384-2841-3

The Bhagavad Gita is the title of Winthrop Sargeant's translation, first published in 1979, of the Bhagavad Gītā (Sanskrit: भगवद्गीता, "Song of God"), an important Hindu scripture. Among Western English translations of the Gita, Sargeant's is unusual in providing a word-by-word translation with parsing and grammatical explanation, along with Sanskrit and English renderings. The original edition was published in 1979 with the lengthy subtitle An interlinear translation from the Sanskrit, with word-for-word transliteration and translation, and complete grammatical commentary, as well as a readable prose translation and page-by-page vocabularies. The subtitle was omitted from the 2nd edition (1984) and the 3rd edition (2009), which were edited by Christopher Chapple. Huston Smith wrote a foreword to the 3rd edition. Sargeant's translation has been described in The New York Times, and reviewed in professional journals.

== Topics covered ==
The book consists of more than 700 pages, including about 30 pages of introductory material. The translation itself consists of 701 pages, each devoted to a single verse. Each page is divided into two major columns. The first column containing the Sanskrit is given in both Devanāgarī and romanized transliteration, followed by two English renderings. Firstly the author provides a literal translation following the Sanskrit word order where possible, then a polished English translation in verse form. The second column contains a word-by-word translation and grammatical analysis, parsing each of the words to show their inflection and part of speech. Indeed, while there are a number of translations of the Gita with a word-for-word rendering, there are not many that provide a full parsing like this for the student of Sanskrit.

In his foreword to the 2009 edition, Huston Smith wrote that he had written forewords to many books,

but none with the urgency with which I write this one... Because this edition of the Gītā looks so daunting that general readers are likely to conclude that it is not for them. But that would be a serious mistake, for... this is a multivalent book -- there is something in it that will reward every serious reader.... For those who only want to read the Gītā's story... all they need do is read the verses on the bottom left-hand side of each page.... [for] elaboration, they will find it in the right-hand column... where, for example, dharma is translated as duty, law, righteousness, virtue, and honor. (p. ix)

== Reviews and influence ==
Reviews and discussions have appeared in The New York Times, Philosophy East and West, and elsewhere.

In The New York Times, Whitman described the work as a "soon-to-be-issued interlinear translation of the Bhagavad Gita for the nonspecialist reader" (p. 26). The Times quoted Sargeant as stating that "I had been interested in the Bhagavad Gita for many years, but I was never very happy with the various translations of that religious epic into English... so I decided to do one myself for my intellectual stimulation and, at first, without any thought of publication" (p. 26). It also stated that the final version of the translation had been bought by Doubleday in the US and by Allen & Unwin in Britain, and that it was being "composed [for printing] abroad because American printers are lacking in Sanskrit fonts."

== Editions ==
The original edition was published in 1979 by Doubleday. Later US editions were published by SUNY Press. The editions are:

- Sargeant, Winthrop (1979). The Bhagavad Gita: An interlinear translation from the Sanskrit, with word-for-word transliteration and translation, and complete grammatical commentary, as well as a readable prose translation and page-by-page vocabularies. Garden City, NY: Doubleday. (751 pages)
- Sargeant, Winthrop (1984). Christopher Key Chapple (ed.). The Bhagavad Gita. Albany, NY: State University of New York Press. ISBN 978-0-87395-831-8. (739 pages)
- Sargeant, Winthrop (2009). Christopher Key Chapple (ed.). The Bhagavad Gita. Albany, NY: State University of New York Press. ISBN 978-1-4384-2841-3. (739 pages)

A related book, containing only the English rendering of each verse (and not the Sanskrit text, grammatical information, or footnotes) is the "pocket edition":

- Sargeant, Winthrop (1994). The Bhagavad Gita. Albany, NY: State University of New York Press. ISBN 978-0-7914-2030-0. (195 pages)
