= Lincoln Hall (Washington, D.C.) =

Coordinates: 38.8950°N 77.0237°W

Lincoln Hall was a theatre located in Washington, D.C., on the northeast corner of 9th and D Streets NW. It was built in 1867 and was one of the most beautiful theaters in America's capital during the 19th century. It was destroyed by fire on December 5, 1886. Another theater, Lincoln Music Hall was built on the same site and opened in 1889.
