= Nellie A. Hope =

American musicIan and orchestra conductor

Nellie Agnes Hope
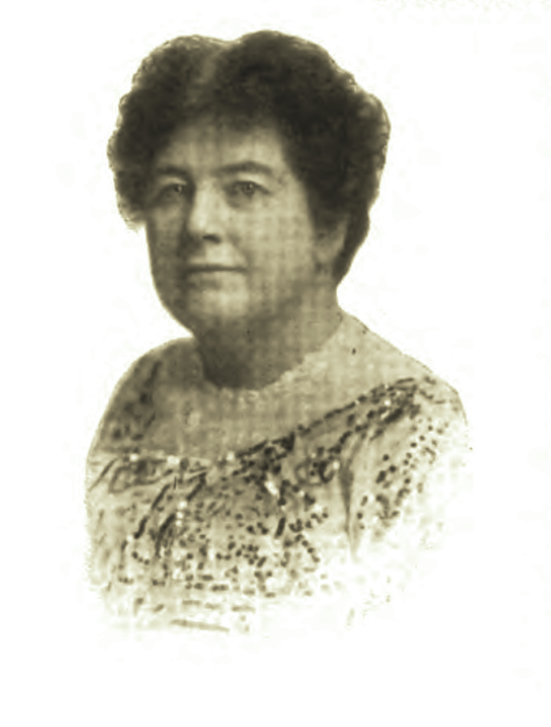

Background information
- Born: June 14, 1864; Prescott, Wisconsin, U.S.
- Died: October 11, 1918 (aged 54) Saint Paul, Minnesota, U.S.
- Occupations: musician; music teacher; orchestra conductor
- Instruments: violin
- Formerly of: Miss Hope's Ladies' Orchestra

Nellie A. Hope (June 14, 1864 – October 11, 1918) was an American violinist, music teacher, and orchestra conductor. She founded and conducted the first women's orchestra directed by a woman in the Twin Cities area, "Miss Hope's Ladies' Orchestra". The first orchestra at Macalester College was established by Hope. In Saint Paul, Minnesota, Hope was active in local music circles, her studios at the Chamber of Commerce Building being the center of a busy musical life.

== Early life and education ==
Nellie Agnes Hope was born in Prescott, Wisconsin, June 14, 1864. (Note: According to symposium.music.org, Hope was born in 1862, while according to familysearch.org, Hope was born July 1866.) Her parents were William Henry Hope and Ellen Jane (Blaine) Hope. From her earliest childhood, she lived in Saint Paul, Minnesota.

She received her early musical education under the Broune Violin School, Prof. Broune being assistant teacher and pupil of Joseph Joachim. She took special courses in vocal music with teachers in Chicago, New York City, and St. Louis.

She spent the summer of 1903 in Europe, where she studied voice with Madame Auguer and with Jacques Bouhy, and the violin with Eugène Ysaÿe in Paris. She studied for some time with Alberto Randegger in London.

== Career ==
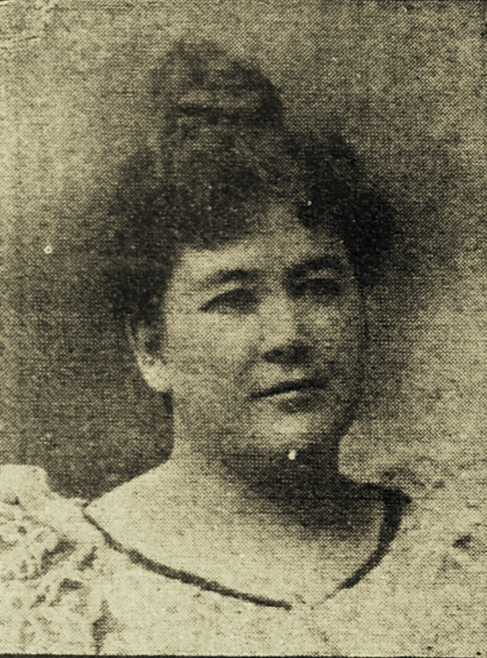
Nellie A. Hope (1904)

Hope taught violin and voice for many years, being a violinist of the Joachim school. She was chair of the violin section of the State Music Teachers' Association, and represented the Minnesota State Music Teachers' Association at the meeting of the national association held in St. Louis.

She organized the first women's orchestra directed by a woman in the Twin Cities area, being the director of Miss Hope's Ladies' Orchestra, which had more than a local reputation. The orchestra was organized for the women's headquarters during the Grand Army of the Republic's (G.A.R.) Thirtieth National Encampment, in Saint Paul, 1896. During the encampment, Hope was presented with a baton, which she continued to wield thereafter.

In 1897, Hope became the first woman appointed to Macalester College's newly-organized department of music. where she taught until 1900. (Note: Macalester College's first music teacher, however, was Mrs. R. N. Parks (1893).)

She was chair of one of the standing committees of the Minnesota State Federation of Women's Clubs. The Minnesota Ladies'Orchestra, with Hope as director, was under the management of the State Federation of Women's Clubs.

Hope was one of the organizers of the Newsboys' Band, was secretary of the Institute Chorus, and held office in most of the music organizations of the Twin Cities and active in many of the charitable institutions. The St. Paul Choral Club owed its success largely to Hope's work in its behalf; she served the club as secretary since its beginning. She was a member of the Schubert Club (Saint Paul), the Associated Music Teachers League (New York City), and the Thursday Club (Minneapolis).

For ten years, she was associated with the choir of the First Baptist Church of Saint Paul, most of her time as director. As of 1904, she had charge of the choir of the Woodland Park Baptist Church.

== Death ==
Nellie Agnes Hope died of heart disease, aggravated by an attack of bronchitis, at her home in Saint Paul, October 11, 1918. She was buried at St. Paul's, Oakland Cemetery.
