= Max Spicker =

German-American musician: organist, conductor, composer

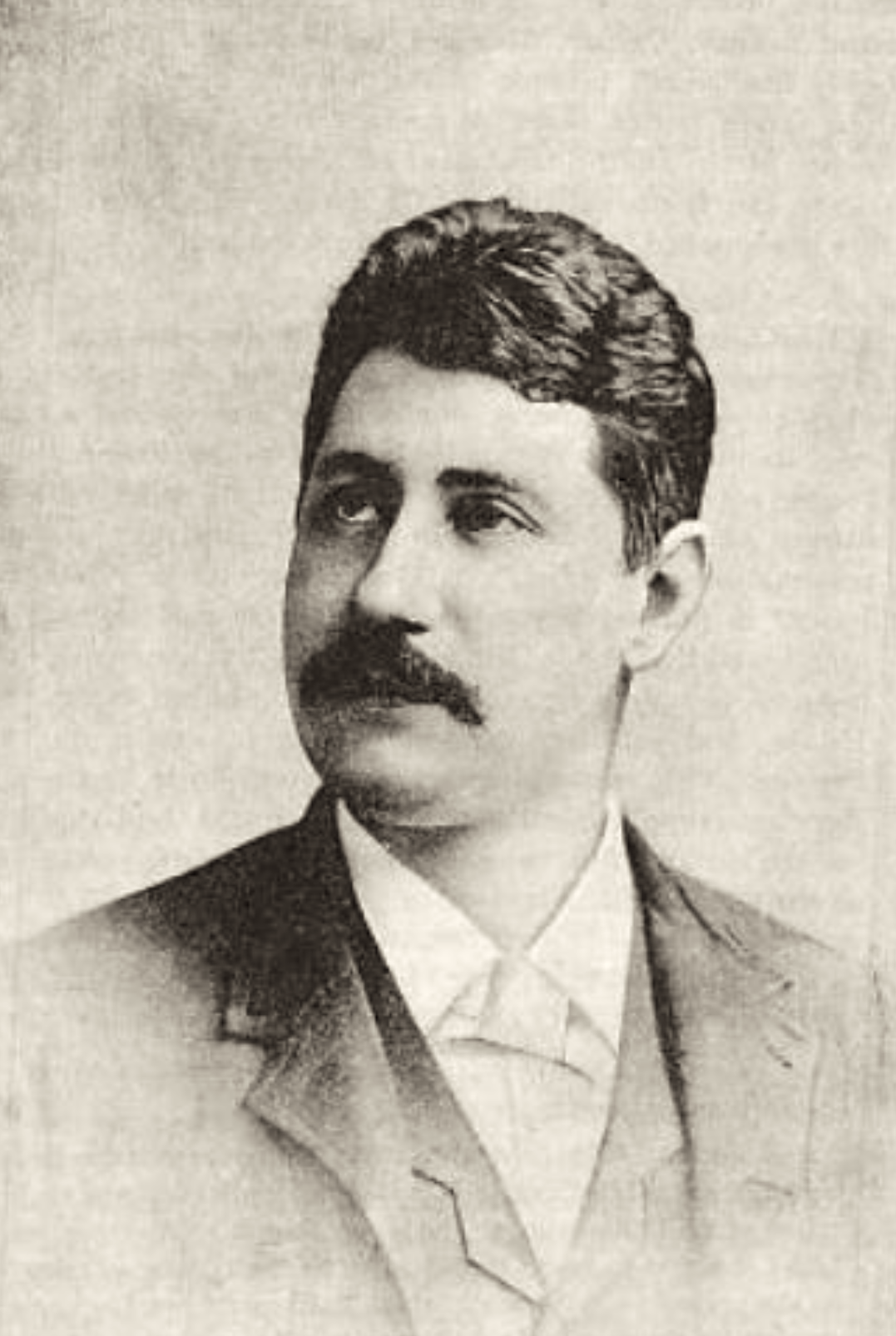
1890 photograph of Max Spicker.

Max Spicker (August 16, 1858 – October 15, 1912) was a German American organist, conductor and composer.

== Biography ==
Spicker was born in Königsberg, Prussia. He studied piano with Louis Köhler for five years, and then attended Leipzig Conservatory from 1877-1879.

In 1882 he moved to New York City, where he began conducting the "Beethoven Männerchor" and worked as a reader for the music publisher G. Schirmer. He was Director of Groschel's Brooklyn Conservatory from 1888 to 1895, after which he was a teacher of harmony and counterpoint at the National Conservatory in New York. He also served for 12 years as choir director of Temple Emmanuel on Fifth Avenue.

He was a member of the New York Musician's Club and an honorary member of the Society of American Cantors.

He died October 15, 1912, in New York City, survived by a wife and son.

== Composer and editor ==
Spicker eventually became an editor for G. Schirmer, editing such collections as the four-volume Anthology of Sacred Song and the five-volume Operatic Anthology. In their day, both publications became standard anthologies for young singers. He also revised the T. Tertius Noble edition of Handel's Messiah for Schirmer, which remains in wide use.

As a composer, most of his works were for solo voice or chorus, although he did complete several larger works.

He was also an arranger of works for voice and orchestra. His orchestral version of Ethelbert Nevin's duet O That We Two Were Maying was recorded by Victor Records in May 1914 by two important singers of the time, Alma Gluck and Louise Homer. Victor also recorded his arrangement of the Jacopo Peri aria Funeste piaggie with baritone Reinald Werrenrath in January 1915. The Victor Catalog also includes an arrangement of Mattei's Non é ver in English for tenor and orchestra, recorded by tenor Lambert Murphy in 1912, and Die Heimat for vocal quartet, recorded by "The Manhattan Quartet" in 1911.

He also did Jewish liturgical music. Strimple named him as one of "the most prominent Jewish liturgical musicians at the beginning of the century". In 1901 Spicker and William Sparger jointly published a Sabbath evening and morning service. It included works by non-Jewish composers, such as a setting of "S'u Sheorim" based on a melody in Gounod's Faust.

== Large musical works ==
- Suite for orchestra
- Incidental music to Schiller's Demetrius
- Der Pilot, cantata for baritone solo, male chorus and orchestra

== Other vocal compositions ==
Published by G. Schirmer unless noted

- Die Linde (men's chorus, text by F. Bercht), op. 15, unknown publisher, 1886
- O schneller mein Ross (song, text by Geibel), op. 20, 1886
- Mondnacht (men's chorus, text by Eichendorff), op. 19, no. 1, published by F. Luckhardt, Berlin, 1887
- Tragödie (song, text by Heine), op. 14, published by F. Luckhardt, Berlin, 1887
- Zwei Lieder, op. 8, published by F. Luckhardt, Berlin, 1887
1. Frühlingstraum (text by W. Müller)
2. In dieser Stunde (text by R. Prutz)
- Zwei Lieder, op. 10, published by F. Luckhardt, Berlin, 1887
1. Nur vor dem Abschiednehmen ist mir bang (text by F. X. Seidl)
2. Abendfriede (text by Eichrodt)
- Zwei Lieder (texts by Heinrich Heine, op. 18, published by F. Luckhardt, Berlin, 1887
1. Leise zieht durch mein Gemüth
2. Die Wasserlilie
- A collection of glees and part songs for mixed voices, 1890
- Shall I Wed Thee? (song, text by Bayard Taylor), op. 37, 1896
- In Thee, O God, do I put my trust (sacred song for alto, Psalm 71), op. 48, 1899
- Oh! Thou, whose Pow'r Tremendous ("Hymn-Anthem with Alto Solo"), op. 49, 1899
- Fear Not, O Israel, choral anthem, op. 50, 1900
- Why Art Thou Cast Down, My Soul?, sacred song, op. 54, 1902
- Evening and Morning (voice and piano or organ, text by Rev. I. G. Smith), op. 56, 1905
- Zwei Männerchöre, op. 40, published by H. Flammer, 1926
1. unknown
2. Es blickt so still der Mond mich an
- Misc. other choral compositions
- Many other songs

== Editions ==
Published by G. Schirmer unless noted

- Aus aller Herren Länder (a collection of folk songs arranged for male choir)
- Anthology of Modern French Song, 1939
- Anthology of Sacred Song, 4 volumes
- Bach, Christmas Oratorio, vocal score, 1939
- Balfe, The Bohemian Girl (opera in 3 acts), vocal score, 1902
- The Cecilia collection of part-songs for two women's voices, 1898
- Fifty-two Sacred Songs, You Like to Sing, 1939
- Handel, The Messiah (oratorio)
- Obbligato Songs (songs with violin or 'cello and piano), 1905
- Operatic Anthology, 5 volumes
- The Seminary series: a collection of two and three part songs for women's voices with piano accompaniment, 1890
- Seventy glees and part songs for male voices, 1884–96
- Songs of Germany (81 folksongs and popular songs), 1904
- Synagogical Service, 2 volumes, with W. Sparger, 1901
