= Maurice Arnold =

- Born: 19 January 1865; St. Louis, Missouri
- Died: 23 October 1937 (aged 72) New York City
- Occupation: Composer
- Instruments: Piano, violin
- Years active: 1888-190?

Maurice Arnold Strothotte (19 January 1865, St. Louis, Missouri – 23 October 1937, New York City, New York) was an American composer and performer.

== History ==
Maurice Arnold Strothotte was born in St Louis, Missouri in 1865. He later shortened his name to Maurice Arnold. Arnold's father was a physician and his mother a prominent pianist and his first teacher. At the age of fifteen he went to Cincinnati, Ohio studying at the College of Music for three years. In 1883 he traveled to Germany to study counterpoint and composition with Georg Vierling and Heinrich Urban in Berlin. Mr. Urban attempted to discourage him when Arnold began to incorporate African-American "plantation" dance elements into his music.

Following studies in Berlin Arnold went on a tour of Hungary, Bulgaria and Turkey. Some of his compositions show the influence of his travels through those countries. Upon returning to Germany he then entered the Cologne Conservatory of Music where his first piano sonata was written and performed. He next went to Breslau, where, under the instruction of Max Bruch, he wrote one of his first major works, his cantata "The Wild Chase." Returning to Saint Louis he busied himself as a solo violinist and teacher, traveling also as an opera conductor.

Maurice Arnold was one of many African-American students of Antonín Dvořák during the Bohemian composer's stay in the United States as director of the newly formed National Conservatory of Music of America in New York (1892–1895). Arnold participated in Dvořák's famous January 23, 1894 concert about which the New York Herald wrote "It was a remarkable event. Each soloist with one exception belong to the colored race. Bodies had been liberated but the gates of the artistic world were still locked. (Conservatory founder) Jeannette Thurber's efforts in this effort were ably seconded by Dr. Dvořák." And while the program included Arnold's four "American Plantation Dances" the main attraction of the evening was Dvořák's arrangement of Stephen Foster's "The Old Folks at Home" for chorus and orchestra. Arnold's four-movement suite, "Plantation Dances." Op. 32, was thereafter performed with some regularity and was published for full orchestra as well as in an arrangement for piano duet in the United States and in Germany.

Arnold also wrote a work entitled "Dramatic Overture" and two comic operas. His "Valse Elegante" for two pianos, eight hands is composed in a charming salon style typical of the time and easily performed with a quartet of amateur pianists. Arnold also wrote a fugue for two pianos, eight hands, a "Minstrel Serenade" for violin and piano, and six duets for violin and viola. Among his many vocal works the most remarkable is his setting of the poem, "I Think of Thee in Silent Night." Arnold also wrote works for ballet, a tarantella for string orchestra, and a symphony (unpublished). He was also the author of the textbook "Some Points in Modern Orchestration."

But it is as a student at the then newly formed National Conservatory of Music in New York City and his association with the conservatory's director Antonín Dvořák for which Maurice Arnold is most remembered. Dvořák was extremely encouraging to the young Arnold at a time when Dvořák's philosophy of American nationalism in music was ridiculed by many of the musical establishment in New England. Even Edward MacDowell, the dean of American composers of his day, wrote "In spite of Dvořák's efforts to dress up American music in Negro clothing, it is my opinion that foreign artistry should have no place in our music, if it is to be worth of our free country." Crusading against the "social sanctification of the arts" popular in certain circles of the day Dvořák stated in the New York Herald (May, 1893) "I am now convinced that the future music of this country must be built on the foundations of the song which are called Negro melodies. They must become the basis of a serious and original school of composition which should be established in the United States of America."

Dvořák's students were represented in full force at the Carnegie Hall premiere of his Symphony "From the New World" on December 16, 1893. Dvořák, his wife, and their two sons, sat in a box of honor with Maurice Arnold, as the student composer for whom Dvořák had the highest hopes. Also in attendance was the great African American composer, singer and writer Harry Burleigh. The English horn solo in the second movement Largo made a lasting impression on Maurice Arnold and his fellow composition students, Harvey Worthington Loomis, William Arms Fisher, and Will Marion Cook. Dvořák had described the slow movement as "a study or sketch for a longer work, either a cantata or an opera based on Longfellow's 'Hiawatha.'" William Arms Fisher adapted the English horn melody using his own text "Goin' Home" that eventually established itself as a popular Negro "spiritual." Arnold's version had the text "Mother Mine." from M. Peress "Dvořák to Duke Ellington".

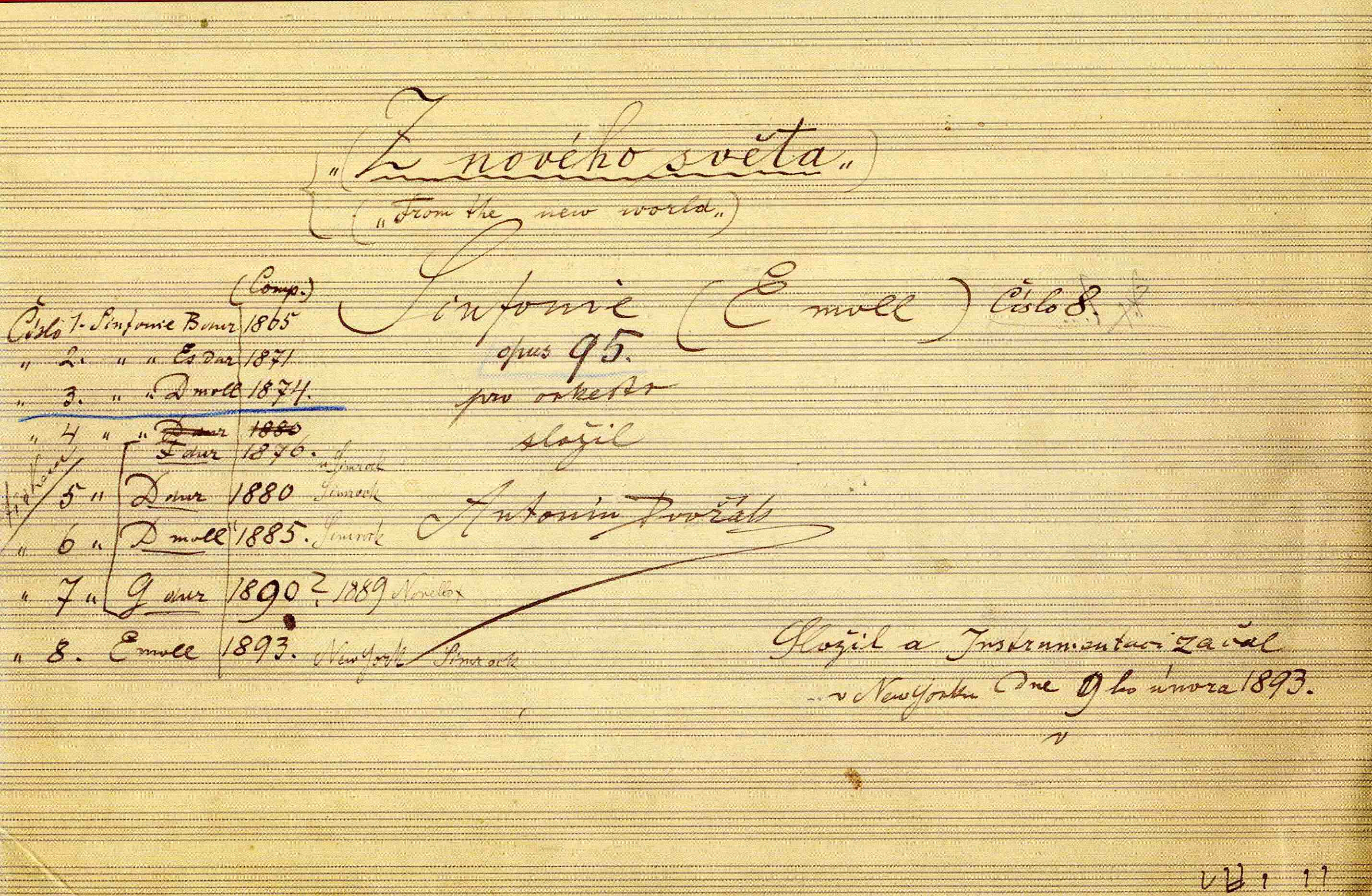
The title page of the autograph score of Dvořák's ninth symphony, 1893

African American composers such as Maurice Arnold, Will Marion Cook and Harry Burleigh applied Dvořák's command of using Creole folk music, spirituals, plantation work songs, and popular music as a basis for the formation of a new American nationalist musical sound. Clara Gottschalk (the pianist, composer Louis Moreau Gottschalk's sister) wrote in the preface to her 1902 arrangements of "Creole songs," "if as Dr. Dvořák has claimed there is in time to be a native school of American music based on the primitive musical utterances of the red man and the black man these negro melodies are historical documents of some interest."

While Maurice Arnold did not become the main musical proponent of Dvořák's philosophy for a new American sound in music he did live long enough to see much of what Dvořák fought for come to pass; the birth of the blues, ragtime, jazz all leading to the first major African American composer William Grant Still. It was Still who finally did utilize the spiritual as a basis for one of the first important and original works for orchestra written by an African American, his "Afro-American Symphony" composed in 1930, seven years before Maurice Arnold's death in New York in 1937.
