= Academy of Music (Washington, D.C.) =

Theatre in Washington, D.C.

Coordinates: 38.8950°N 77.0237°W

The Academy of Music was name of two theatres in Washington D.C. located at the corner of 9th and D Streets on the former site of Lincoln Hall. The first Academy of Music opened as Lincoln Music Hall in 1889, and was renamed the Academy of Music in 1892. It operated until January 24, 1907, when it was destroyed by fire. A new theatre was built on the same site, and it opened as the Academy of Music on September 2, 1907. It was acquired by Tom Moore in 1914, and rebranded the Moore's Orpheum Theatre in February 1914. Under Moore the theater became a cinema for silent film screenings. Its name was changed to the Strand Theatre in August 1914. It was still operating as a movie theater as late as 1942, and then operated as a burlesque theater until closing in 1949. It was demolished in 1952.

== Lincoln Music Hall / Academy of Music (1889-1907) ==
The first Academy of Music was a theatre in Washington D.C. at the corner of 9th and D Streets that was active from 1889 through 1907. Originally called Lincoln Music Hall, it was built in 1889 on the site of the former Lincoln Hall (destroyed by fire in 1886) at 401 9th St NW. The theatre was designed by Appleton P. Clark Jr., had a seating capacity of 1800 people, and was built of brick and stone with terra cotta ornamentation. It was owned by John A. Prescott, and construction began in May 1889. The roof of the theater was completed in October 1889, Frankling Langstaff was hired to design the interior of the building, and he painted several frescos in the theater in addition to crafting other designs.

Jeannette Thurber was placed in charge of planning the inaugural concert of the theater, and she recruited the Boston Symphony Orchestra (BSO) for the event. The theatre opened on December 20, 1889, with Arthur Nikisch conducting the BSO with guest soloists including cellist Victor Herbert; soprano Marie Decca; pianists Rafael Joseffy and Adele Margulies; violinist Leopold Lichtenberg; and baritone Théophile Manoury. When the theatre came under the management W. W. Rapley in 1892 its name was changed to the Academy of Music. It continued under this name until it was destroyed by fire on January 24, 1907.

== Academy of Music / Moore's Orpheum Theatre/ Strand Theatre (1907-1952) ==
After the first Academy of Music was destroyed by fire, a new theatre was built on the same site in 1907 using plans by Appleton P. Clark Jr. It opened as the Academy of Music on September 2, 1907. It operated under this name until February 1907 when it became the Orpheum Theatre. The change occurred after the theater was purchased by Tom Moore, and the theater was also referred to as Moore's Orpheum Theatre. It opened as the Orpheum Theatre on February 14, 1907, with a screening of The Battle of Waterloo. The theatre at this time operated as a cinema, and underwent remodeling for that purpose. Its name was changed to the Strand Theatre in August 1914. Films were still being screened at the theatre as late as March 1942. It its later years it operated as a burlesque theatre until closing in 1949. In March 1952 the theater's pars, including its wrought iron steps, fixtures, plumbing, and chairs, were being stripped and sold. It was demolished later that year.
