= Heinrich Urban =

German violinist and composer (1837–1901)

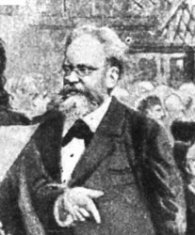
Heinrich Urban

Heinrich Urban (27 August 1837 – 24 November 1901) was a German violinist and composer.

== Life and career ==
Heinrich Urban was born in Berlin, and studied with Ferdinand Laub, Hubert Ries and Friedrich Kiel. He sang alto in the Königliche Domchor and the Königliche Kapelle. He continued his studies later in Paris, and then worked as a violinist, composer and music teacher. He also served as conductor of the Berliner Dilettanten Orchester Verein (Amateur Orchestra Society). Noted students include harpsichordist Wanda Landowska, Polish pianist and composer Ignacy Jan Paderewski, Polish composer Mieczysław Karłowicz, American composer Fannie Charles Dillon, American composer Maurice Arnold Strothotte, American composer and music critic Leonard Liebling, Polish musicologist Henryk Opieński, and American pianist and composer Carl Adolph Preyer. He died in Berlin.

== Works ==
Urban wrote overtures, a symphony and symphonic poems, an opera and a violin concerto. He also wrote solo and chamber music for violin. Selected works include:

- Frühling (Spring), symphony
- Der Rattenfänger von Hameln, symphonic poem
- Konradin, opera
