= Jacques Bouhy =

Belgian baritone (1848–1929)

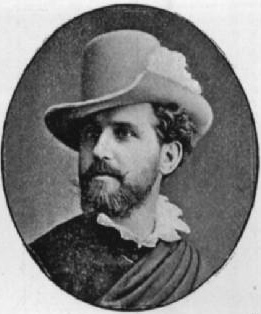
Jacques Bouhy by Nadar

Jacques-Joseph-André Bouhy (18 June 1848 – 29 January 1929) was a Belgian baritone, most famous for being the first to sing the "Toreador Song" in the role of Escamillo in the opera Carmen.

Bouhy was born in Pepinster. After studying at the Liège Conservatory of Music, he made his début at the Paris Opéra as Méphistophélès (Faust) in 1871. He performed at the Opéra-Comique as Figaro (Le Nozze di Figaro), Escamillo (Carmen) in 1875. At the Comique he also created the role of Don César de Bazan in 1872. In 1882 he appeared at Covent Garden singing in Faust and Carmen. He spent time in the United States as the first director of the National Conservatory of Music of America in New York City before returning to Paris to sing the High Priest in Samson et Dalila (1890). He was extremely popular with audiences, and counted Massenet among his admirers.

Singers taught by him or who received instruction from him include Gervase Elwes, Clara Butt, Louise Kirkby Lunn, Suzanne Adams, Bessie Abott, Leon Rains, Eva Gauthier, Olive Rae, Florence Turner-Maley, Lillian Blauvelt and Louise Homer, as well as Nellie A. Hope and Xhosa/Scottish contralto Jessie M.Soga.

He died in Paris in January 1929 aged 80.

== Sources ==
- Forbes, Elizabeth (1992). "Bouhy, Jacques". In Stanley Sadie (ed.). The New Grove Dictionary of Opera. London.
