= American Opera Company =

The American Opera Company was the name of six different opera companies active in the United States. The first company was founded in New York City in February 1886, but lasted only one season. The second company grew out of the Eastman School of Music in Rochester, New York, and was active from 1924 up until 1930, when it went bankrupt following the Wall Street crash of 1929. The third company, located in Trenton, New Jersey, was active in 1937 only. The fourth company was actively performing in Philadelphia from 1946 through 1950.

The National Opera Company and New American Opera Company were consecutive successors of the 1886 company.

== Jeannette Thurber's American Opera Company ==
The first American Opera Company was founded by patron of the arts Jeannette Meyers Thurber, who also established the National Conservatory of Music of America. It was incorporated in 1878 with an ambitious prospectus, which anticipated productions featuring "the largest regularly trained chorus ever employed in grand opera in America", "the largest ballet corps ever presented in grand opera in America", "four thousand new and correct costumes for which no expense has been spared in fabric or manufacture", and scenery "painted by the most eminent scenic artists in America". Although based in New York City, it was intended as a national company that toured throughout the United States, with the goal of increasing American appreciation for opera by offering productions in English, by American performers, at affordable ticket prices. A succinct statement of Thurber's vision for the company appeared in the New York Times in August 1886, which reported that in her view "the true conception of a national opera is opera sung in a nation's language and, as far as practicable, the work of a nation's composers".

The new company, which had Andrew Carnegie as its president and other New York millionaires among its board of directors, was under the musical direction of Theodore Thomas, with Gustav Hinrichs and Arthur Mees as assistant conductors, and Charles Locke as business manager. Its first season opened on January 6, 1886, with the first American performance of The Taming of the Shrew by Hermann Goetz, and 13 other productions followed, for a total of 126 individual performances. The repertoire included Verdi's Aida, Wagner's Lohengrin and The Flying Dutchman, and Gounod's Faust, all sung in English translation. Performances in New York took place in the Academy of Music and the old Metropolitan Opera House, and during the first season the company also performed on tour in Philadelphia, Washington D.C., and St. Louis. In August, they announced an ambitious plan to travel to Paris, a trip that never came about.

Although the productions were, by and large, a critical success, money quickly became a problem. Faced with a large operating deficit, Carnegie and other sponsors began to separate themselves from the project, and in order to escape its creditors the company was reorganized in December 1886 under a new name, the "National Opera Company". A second season followed, notable for the American premiere of Rubinstein's Nero on March 14, 1887, and for a national tour that took the company across the continent as far as San Francisco, dogged along the way by increasing financial difficulties. Singers and stage hands began to strike and sue for unpaid wages, and by the spring of 1887 the company was the subject of at least seven lawsuits. The director, Theodore Thomas, who later attributed the demise of the company to "inexperienced and misdirected enthusiasm in business management, and to misapplication of money", left on June 15, 1887, and after one final performance without him, Thurber's operatic experiment came to an end. However, the new musical director, Gustav Hinrichs, formed the New American Opera Company from members of the failed venture, with the addition of several leading artists.

== Rochester's American Opera Company ==
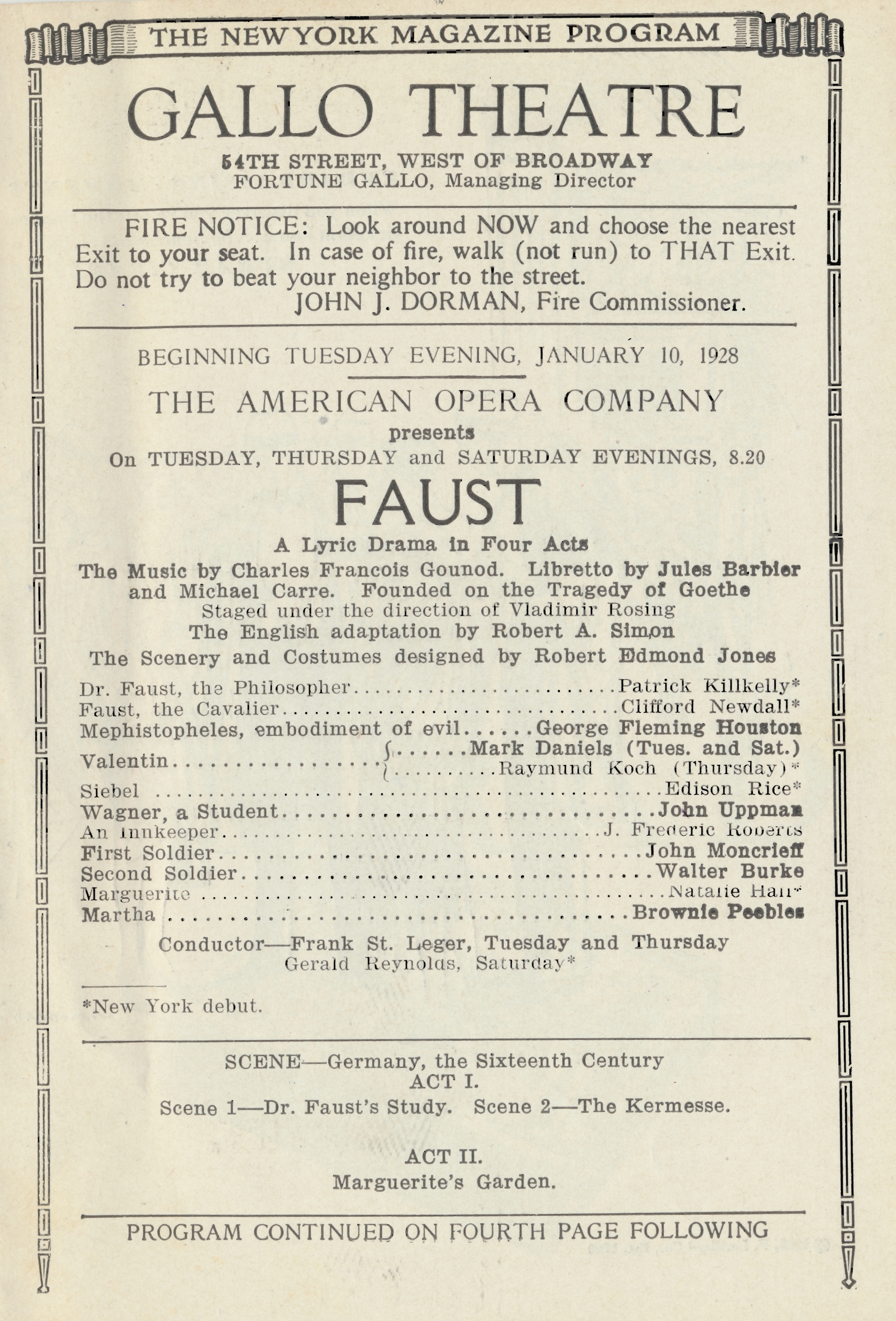
”Faust” program, opening night at Gallo Theatre, Jan 10, 1928.

In 1924, a professional touring opera company emerged from the innovative productions of Vladimir Rosing and Rouben Mamoulian at the Eastman School of Music in Rochester. Its mission was to perform operas in English to popular audiences nationwide. First known as the Rochester American Opera Company, the group made its New York City debut in April 1927 at the Guild Theatre. It won the support of many wealthy and influential backers, including financier Otto Kahn, opera stars Mary Garden and Marcella Sembrich, and socialite Edith Rockefeller McCormick. By the time the company performed for President Coolidge and 150 members of Congress at Washington D.C.'s Poli's Theater in December 1927, the company was known as the American Opera Company.

The American Opera Company strictly adhered to a non-star policy, developing instead a unity of ensemble whereby a singer might have a leading role one night and a supporting role the next. A number of important singers emerged from the company, including future Metropolitan Opera stars John Gurney (bass-baritone), Helen Oelheim, Thelma Votipka, Charles Kullman, Nancy McCord and Gladys Swarthout. Future 1930s Broadway stars Natalie Hall and Bettina Hall were also among the principals, as was Hollywood's George Houston (actor). The company was known for the youth and attractiveness of its performers.

During January and February 1928 the American Opera Company brought seven weeks of opera to Broadway at New York's Gallo Opera House, including a notable adaptation of Faust with a new libretto by music critic for The New Yorker Robert A. Simon and sets by designer Robert Edmond Jones.

In addition to new English productions of familiar operas, the company subsequently premiered several works composed by American composers, including The Sunset Trail by Charles Wakefield Cadman, The Legend of the Piper by Eleanor Everest Freer, and Yolanda of Cyprus by Clarence Loomis.

Three ambitious North American tours were completed, with the opera company performing in 42 cities across the United States and Canada, but the Crash of 1929 caused bookings for the Fall 1930–31 season to disappear.

The American Opera Company won an official endorsement from President Herbert Hoover in February 1930 in a letter to the Speaker of the House, calling for it to become "a permanent national institution", but Presidential support was not enough as the country sank further into the Great Depression.

Among the company's last performances were a two-week run at the famous Casino Theatre on Broadway just before the beloved New York theater's demolition in early 1930.

== American Opera Company of Los Angeles ==
Sidor Belarsky founded the American Opera Company of Los Angeles which staged its first opera, Boris Godunov, at the Philharmonic Auditorium in Los Angeles in July 1934. It was officially incorporated the following September. The company repeated Boris Godunov in April 1935 at the same theatre. Baritone Stephen Douglass portrayed the title role in Eugene Onegin with the company in September 1935.

== Trenton's American Opera Company ==
The American Opera Company in Trenton, New Jersey was founded in 1937 by conductor H. Maurice Jacquet. It gave just two performances of Benjamin Godard's comic opera La Vivandière that year starring Josepha Chekova; one at the Robin Hood Dell in Philadelphia. before disbanding.

== Chicago's American Opera Company ==
The American Opera Company of Chicago was founded in 1938 with the goal of developing young American singers and providing them opportunities to perform in operas. It was co-founded by E. C. McCarthy and Anna Del Preda. The company's first performance was a double bill of Cavalleria rusticana and Pagliacci which was given on February 25, 1938, at the Chicago Auditorium.

== Philadelphia's American Opera Company ==
The American Opera Company in Philadelphia was founded in 1946 by conductor Vernon Hammond, musical director of the city's Academy of Vocal Arts. Its first performance, of Mozart's Die Entführung aus dem Serail with an English libretto, was at the Academy on October 24, 1946. Adelaide Bishop, James Pease, and Léopold Simoneau took major roles. It closed in 1950.
