= Lillian Blauvelt =

American operatic soprano singer (1873–1947)

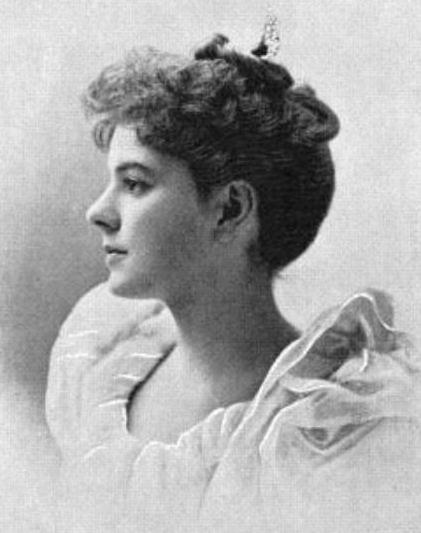
Lillian Blauvelt ca. 1890s

Lillian Blauvelt (1873–1947) was a popular opera singer in New York City and internationally in the first decade of the 20th century. Her voice was a lyric soprano with a very pure timbre and dramatic distinction. Her vocal range was from G to D. She was from Brooklyn, New York, and eventually toured every country in Europe.

== Opera diva ==
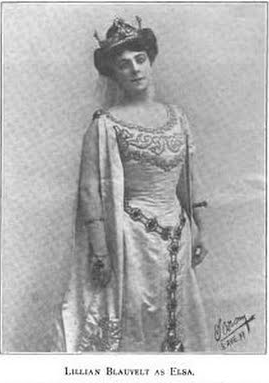
Lillian Blauvelt, from a 1907 publication.

She was a graduate of the National Conservatory of Music. Blauvelt sang in concerts in New York City and Brooklyn prior to becoming the soprano of the West Presbyterian Church, 42nd Street between Fifth Avenue and Sixth Avenue, in 1893.

In January 1893 she sang the air (music) for Aida from Act I, and the duet for Aida and Amneris from Act II, with Mrs. Luckstone-Myers, a contralto. The Sunday concert was held at Music Hall.

In 1898 she sang under Sir Henry Wood at the Royal Albert Hall in London. Forty years later his list of the finest artists he had ever worked with included Ferruccio Busoni, Fritz Kreisler, Pablo Casals and Lillian Blauvelt.

She performed with the New York Symphony at Carnegie Hall. In the ninth season of Symphony Concerts for Young People, 1904, the program was devoted to works by Bizet, Gounod, Verdi, and Richard Wagner. Blauvelt and Edward P. Johnson were soloists with the orchestra conducted by Frank Damrosch.

She sang before an audience numbering 3,000 at the Asbury Park, New Jersey Casino in July 1904. The following month Alice Roosevelt Longworth attended a concert given by the Bar Harbor, Maine, Choral Society, during which Blauvelt sang. She replaced Ella Russell in a solo quartet at a Christmas 1904 performance of The Messiah. It was presented by the Oratorio Society at Carnegie Hall.

In 1905 Blauvelt signed a six-year contract with Fred Whitney to appear in comic opera. She reportedly received $504,000 for her services or $2,000 per week. Her first venture after the pact was made was a production of The Rose of Alhambra, written by Charles Emerson Cook and Lucius Hosmer. Cook was a close affiilliate of David Belasco.

She was a soloist for a February 1905 New York Symphony Concert given at Alexander Hall on the campus of Princeton University. She sang Una Voce Poco Fa by Rossini. Five first violins were added to the orchestra to restrain the brass effect. The same year she sang in a production of Dvořák's Stabat Mater. Her solo was part of a tribute to Dvořák held at Carnegie Hall on March 14. Blauvelt was chosen to sing the soprano portion of a Verdi composition at a memorial concert to the composer held in Rome, Italy, in 1905.

She appeared at the Lyceum Theatre in Rochester, New York, in November 1905, for the first production of The Rose of the Alhambra. The comic opera was written by Charles Emerson Cook and directed by F. C. Whitney. It was her first work in light opera after working for years in grand opera. Blauvelt received encores until she was compelled to refuse further acknowledgements. In 1906, she starred in Victor Herbert's The Magic Knight.

In December 1912 she returned from Europe and performed in a solo quartet in Messiah at the Aeolian Hall. This marked her first participation in a New York City concert for a number of years. A review said that her superb voice and style had changed very little, but that by rushing the air in Rejoice Greatly, she diminished its importance to the audience.

== Marriages ==
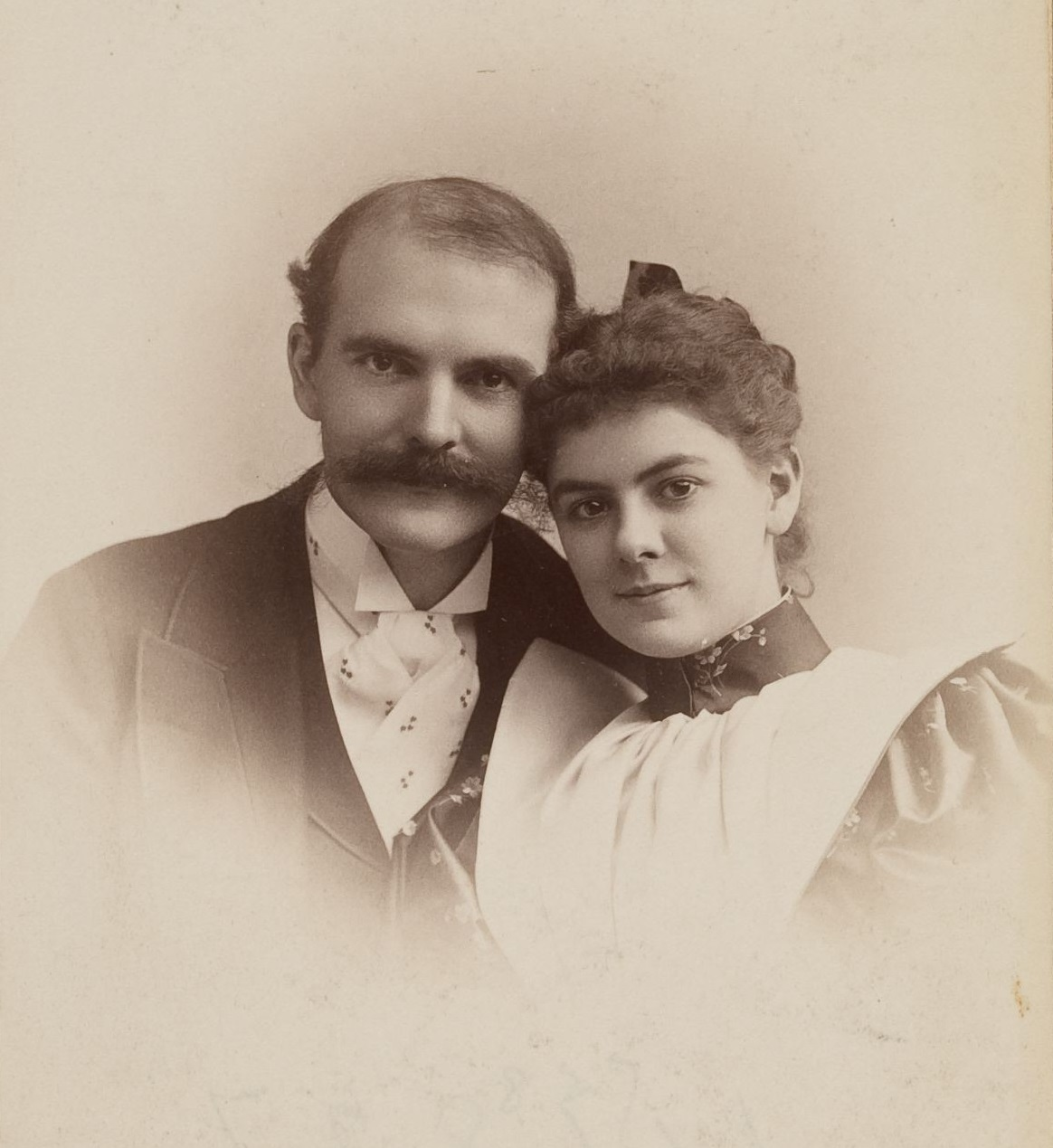
Blauvelt with her first husband, Royal S. Smith

Blauvelt was married a number of times. Her first husband was Royal S. Smith, a Brooklyn organist. By 1907 she was married to William F. Pendleton. On June 30, 1910, she wed Dr. Walter Carpenter in Brooklyn.
