= Leo Schulz =

Kingdom of Prussia-born American cellist

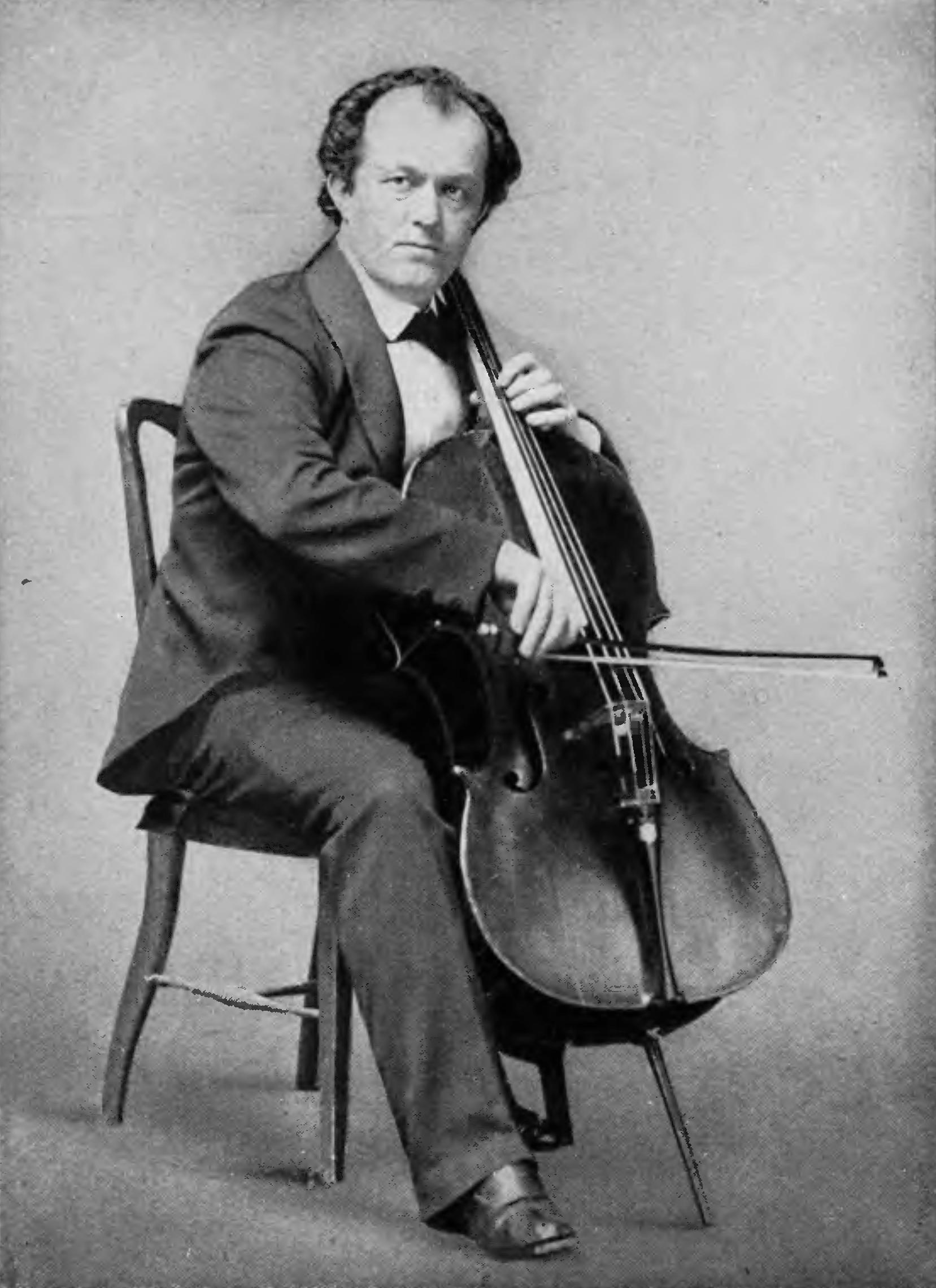
Leo Schulz during his time as principal cellist of the New York Philharmonic Orchestra posing for the 1917 publication Instruments of the Modern Symphony Orchestra

Leo Schulz (March 28, 1865 – August 12, 1944) was a Kingdom of Prussia-born American cellist.

== Biography ==
Schulz was born in Poznań, the then Kingdom of Prussia, currently Poland. His grandfather, a bandmaster in the Prussian army, was originally named Soltys but was obliged to adopt the German name Schultz. As a child he toured Germany as a pianist along with his sister, a violinist. At 13 attended the Royal Academic High School of Music in Berlin, where he studied under Robert Hausmann, Richard Barth, Woldermar Bargiel, Friedrich Kiel, and Joseph Joachim. He was a principal cellist in Berlin as well as in the Gewandhaus Orchestra of Leipzig from 1886 to 1889.

In 1889 Schulz moved to Boston to take the post of principal cellist of the Boston Symphony Orchestra. He was professor of the New England Conservatory. He became a United States citizen in 1893.

In 1898 he moved to New York, taking the post of principal cellist of the New York Philharmonic Society, a position he held until his retirement in 1929. He was succeeded by Alfred Wallenstein. While in New York, he was also president of the New York Tonkünstler, played in the Mannes String Quartet and the Margulies Trio. He taught at the National Conservatory of Music of America in New York and at Yale University. In 1906 he started his own Leo Schulz Quartet. In the 1920s, with Mikhail Press, he founded the Old Masters Trio.

He was a professor at Yale University for a time.

== Publications ==
Schulz was a prolific editor, arranger, and transcriber for the cello.

- Cello Album, Vol. 1
- Cello Album, Vol. 2
- Cello Classics, Vol. 1
- Cello Classics, Vol. 2
- Cello Compositions, Vol. 1
- Cello Compositions, Vol. 2

He also wrote many cello compositions, songs, orchestral overtures, and cantatas, including:

- Souvenir de Posen for cello and piano.

== Personal life ==
On April 12, 1885, he married Ida Bartsch in Berlin.
