= National Conservatory of Music of America =

Former music school in New York City

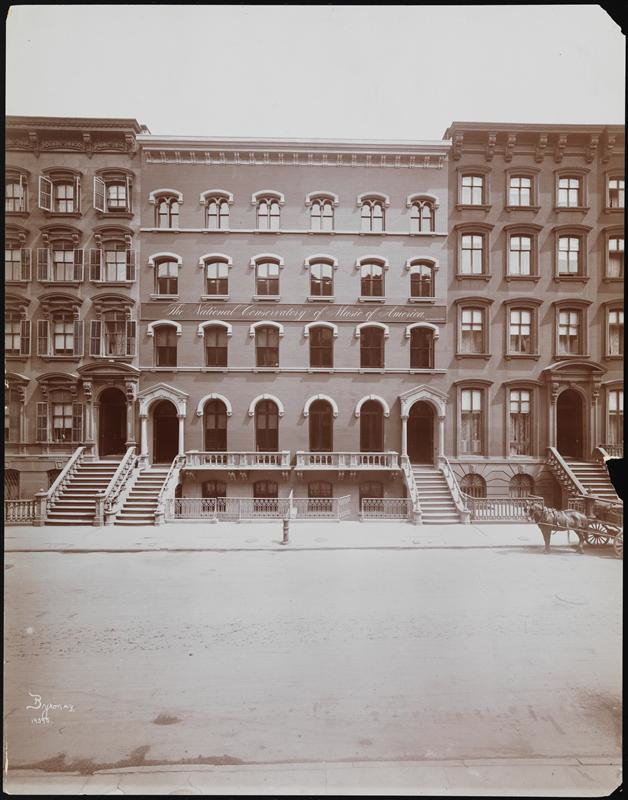
Facade of the National Conservatory of Music of America (Jeannette Meyers Thurber's) at 47-49 West 25th Street.

The National Conservatory of Music of America was an institution for higher education in music founded in 1885 in New York City by Jeannette Meyers Thurber. The conservatory was officially declared defunct by the state of New York in 1952, although for all practical pedagogical purposes, it had ceased to function much earlier than that. Between its founding and about 1920, however, the conservatory played an important part in the education and training of musicians in the United States, and for decades Thurber attempted to turn it into a federally-supported national conservatory in a European style. A number of prominent names are associated with the institution, including that of Victor Herbert and Antonín Dvořák, director of the conservatory from September 27, 1892 to 1895. It was at the conservatory that Dvořák composed his famous E minor Symphony and subtitled it, at Thurber's suggestion, From the New World.

== Active years ==
The idea of a federally funded national conservatory in the United States had been a dream of Thurber's, who had studied at the Paris Conservatory in her teens. In the early 1880s she convinced a number of philanthropists, including Andrew Carnegie, to sponsor the founding of such an institution. The idea was to model the institution after that of Paris in order to create a "national musical spirit." The conservatory (originally the "American School of Opera") was incorporated in the state of New York on September 21, 1885. The first director was Belgian baritone, Jacques Bouhy. Among the faculty was also Emma Fursch-Madi, one of the great sopranos of the day. There were 84 students when the conservatory started operations, operating out of two converted homes near Union Square at 126-128 East 17th St. in New York City.

It is not clear from sources exactly how much it cost to attend the conservatory or how scholarships were awarded. Some sources claim that no tuition was charged at all. Henry Finck, an NCMA music history lecturer for decades, wrote "It was not organized as a money-making institution, but as a musical high school ... for a merely nominal sum, or, if talented, without any charge for tuition. ... [It was intended for those seeking a profession but] also for amateurs, for whom there are special courses." Its mission included "seeking out and encouraging female, minority and physically disabled students". In any event, the cost of operations was originally met by Mrs. Thurber and others. After three years of existence, the conservatory petitioned the US Congress for $200,000 (approximately $5.7mil in 2023, adjusted for inflation) to support the institution, saying that "... hundreds of candidates have had to be rejected from lack of room to accommodate them and of funds to increase the staff of Professors which would be required by their admittance. ... " The petition failed.

Thurber changed strategy and then began lobbying for federal government support and funding of a national conservatory to be based in Washington, DC. A bill "to incorporate the National Conservatory of Music of America" was passed by Congress and signed into law by President Benjamin Harrison on March 3, 1891. It read (in part):

"Said corporation is hereby empowered to found, establish, and maintain a national conservatory of music within the District of Columbia for the education of citizens of the United States and such other persons as the trustees may deem proper in all the branches of music. The said corporation shall have the power to grant and confer diplomas and degree of doctor of music or other honorary degrees"

The next year, Dvořák began his three year post as director. In 1893, Virginia senator Eppa Hunton introduced Senate bill 1148 "To provide a building site for the National Conservatory of Music of America", but the bill failed and was indefinitely postponed. The school continued to function in New York City, existing solely from philanthropy.

The school awarded substantial prizes to four composers after their works were judged at a March 30, 1893 concert at Madison Square Garden. In that year Dvořák and Thurber insisted that the Conservatory be "thrown open free of charge" to black students. "In the negro melodies of America I discover all that is needed for a great and noble school of music," Dvořák wrote.

== Decline ==
By 1900, the school had educated about 3,000 students. After that date and after a rapidly changing series of directors, the National Conservatory of Music of America started to fade, not from a single catastrophic failure such as bankruptcy, but more through the declining energies of its driving force, Mrs. Thurber herself. Additionally, there was increasing competition from other institutions in the area, including The Institute of Musical Art of the City of New York, which was founded in 1904 and became the Juilliard School of Music in 1924. There were also concerns from many private institutions that a federally funded national conservatory on the European model would reduce their own schools to the role of a "feeder system."

In 1913, the school attempted to hire German composer Engelbert Humperdinck as director, but although he signed a contract, the Prussian government refused him permission. By 1916, the school had moved to 126-128 West 79th Street. In 1918, Thurber decided to renew her efforts to establish a national conservatory. She instigated House Resolution 13562 to update the trustees of the conservatory (most of the original trustees from the 1891 bill had died) and remove the limitation that the conservatory should be located in Washington, D.C.

Around the same time, proposals from other quarters to fund a "national conservatory" were made in apparent ignorance that such an institution already existed. In June 1918, Congressman Henry Bruckner of New York had introduced House resolution 6445 to establish a national conservatory of music. Bruckner's resignation from Congress led to Congressman Donovan revising and resubmitting the bill as House resolution 12803 in August 1918 "To establish a national conservatory of music and art for the education of advance pupils in music in all its branches, vocal and instrumental, and for other purposes". At hearings for the bill in January 1919 before the committee on education, representatives of the American Federation of Musicians, the American Federation of Labor, and the National Federation of Music Clubs spoke in support of nationalized support for conservatory education. Thurber's National Conservatory of Music of America was also represented at these hearings by her lawyer Vernon E. West and secretary Mrs. Charles Shirley. They made the committee aware of the H.R. 13562 submitted earlier that year, and attempted to regain federal support for their conservatory after decades of inaction, even claiming they would not ask for any funding from Congress.

In 1921, President Wilson signed an amending and confirmatory act that the 1891 incorporated conservatory should have the authority to establish branches in the various states.

By 1928 the school was located at 53 West 74th Street. On February 8, 1928, Congress' Committee on Public Buildings and Grounds held further hearings on H.R. 8894, a bill to "designate a building site for the National Conservatory of Music of America and for Other Purposes". Thurber's interests were directly represented in these hearings by Judge William R. Bayes. These hearings did not amount to site selection. A few weeks earlier in a New York Times editorial, Mrs. Thurber was still making her case that

"At no time more than the present has the necessity for a national conservatory of music been so evident... the National Conservatory of Music, which was founded in 1885 and has been in existence for over 40 years, is the only institution of its kind which in scope and in organization is in conformity with the old established models... From its inception the plan... has been to establish a national conservatory of music in Washington with branches... "

The stock market crash of 1929 and subsequent Great Depression led to loss of funds from many philanthropic sources and effectively the end of the Conservatory. There is no record of operations after 1930, though based on a letter from President Roosevelt to Thurber in 1935, it appears she continued to solicit federal funding for the conservatory.

== Legacy ==
Musically, the National Conservatory of Music of America was a brief but bright light in the cultural life of the United States. It aimed to provide affordable musical education for all-comers, including the physically handicapped and African Americans. Its prestige was greatly enhanced by the directorship of Dvořák, and it offered a yearly prize in the area of "American music," a competition that led to the recognition of a number of young composers from the United States.

Among the faculty and administrators associated with the conservatory were:

- Irénée Berge
- Jacques Bouhy
- Walter F. Craig
- Eugène Dufriche
- Antonín Dvořák
- Henry Theophilus Finck
- Emma Fursch-Madi
- Rubin Goldmark
- Victor Herbert
- Gustav Hinrichs
- Rafael Joseffy
- Bruno Klein
- Leopold Lichtenberg
- Eugenie Pappenheim
- Vasily Safonov
- Leo Schulz
- Max Spicker
- Jeannette Thurber
- Camilla Urso
- Leopold Winkler

Students who attended the conservatory included:

- William Axt
- Lillian Blauvelt
- James Tim Brymn
- Harry Burleigh
- Marie Celeste
- Will Marion Cook
- Natalie Curtis
- Olin Downes
- Lucia Dunham
- William Arms Fisher
- Edwin Franko Goldman
- Rubin Goldmark
- Frederick W. Hager
- Ima Hogg
- Harold Levey
- Harvey Worthington Loomis
- William H. Rieger
- Maurice Arnold Strothotte
- Eartha M. M. White
