= Jeannette Thurber =

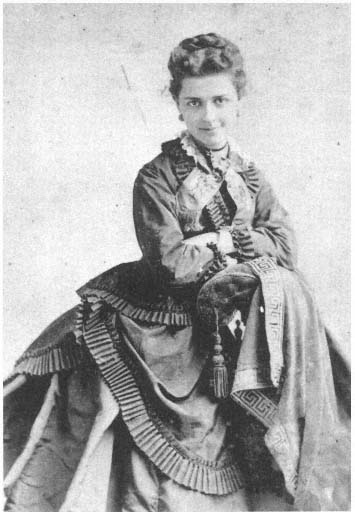
Jeannette Thurber as a young woman, c. 1870

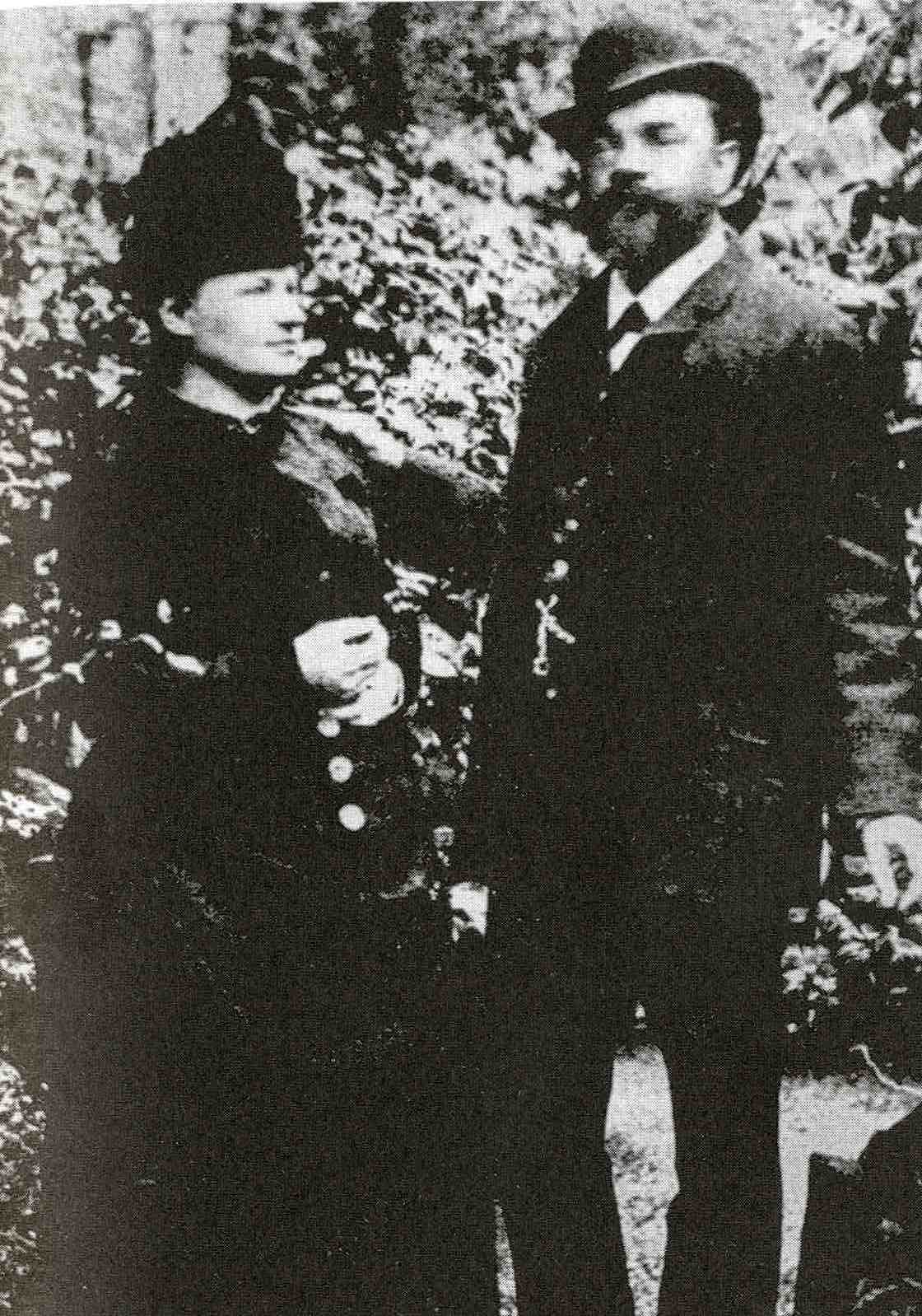
Anna Dvorak with Antonin in London, 1886

Jeannette Thurber (also known as Jeannette Meyers Thurber; January 29, 1850 in Delhi, New York – January 2, 1946 in Bronxville, New York) was amongst the first major patrons of classical music in the United States. Thurber established the National Conservatory of Music of America in 1885—the first of its kind and an endeavor that some say ushered in the first orchestral music with a distinctively American sound. But in a very radical stance for the day, Thurber championed the rights of women, people of color, and people with disabilities to attend her school, sometimes on full scholarship. This was 1885—two decades since the end of the American Civil War—and her school was racially integrated, promoted women, and had an inclusive stance toward people with disabilities.

Thurber founded the school in part because of her belief that a nation should cultivate its own unique music, which made her unusual in an era when the prevailing attitude was that all cultured art, especially orchestral music, came from Germany or Italy. While running the school, she sponsored competitions for American musicians to develop American music.

The National Conservatory of Music of America was the outstanding institution for professional musical preparation in the United States for some 25 years or more. At its height in the 1890s it boasted a faculty of international renown ... and initiated a course of studies whose features became a basis for the curriculum now taken for granted in the colleges and conservatories of this country. Its achievements resulted from the endeavors of a single visionary: Jeannette M Thurber, a wealthy, idealistic New Yorker who devoted most of her life to the school ... Although her innovative design for the Conservatory was influential in shaping the course of American music for the 20th century, Mrs. Thurber and her school have slipped into undeserved obscurity."

== Life ==
Jeannette Meyers was the daughter of Henry Meyers, an immigrant violinist from Copenhagen, Denmark, and Annamarie Coffin Price. She was educated at the Paris Conservatory, which inspired her to advocate for government funding of her school, as was done in France. On September 15, 1869, at the age of 19, she married Francis Beatty Thurber (Delhi, November 13, 1842 – Manhattan, July 4, 1907), who would later become a millionaire grocery wholesaler. The couple had two daughters, Marianne and Jeannette. The family had a summer home at Onteora Park in the Catskill Mountains.

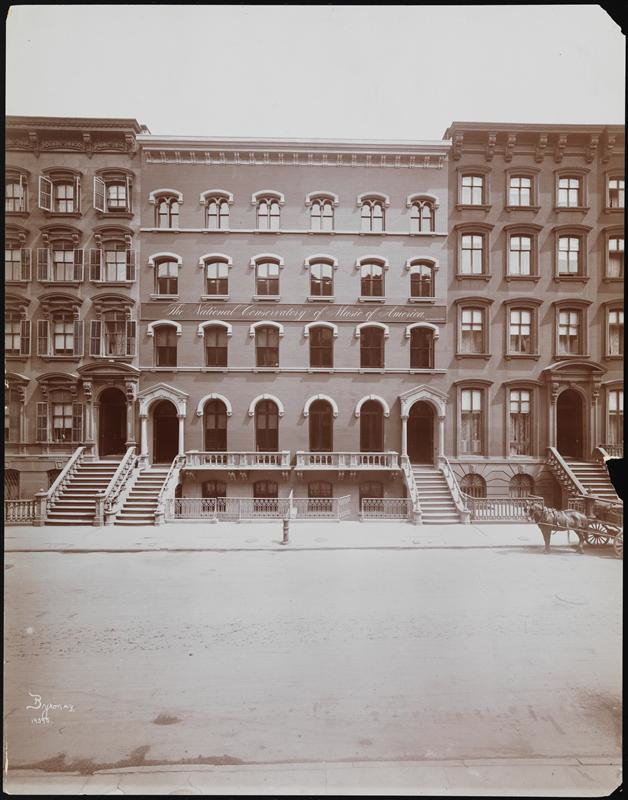
The National Conservatory of Music of America building

In 1884 Thurber sponsored New York City's first Wagner festival. In 1885 she founded the National Conservatory of Music of America and its adjunct American Opera Company, both in New York. In 1888/89 she sponsored the New York debut of the Boston Symphony Orchestra (BSO). But the Conservatory seemed to be her real love, and she grew it from 84 students when it opened to 3,000 students in 1900. Her success was due, in part, to her conviction that her school required an outstanding and publicly-celebrated faculty: its first director was Jacques Bouhy, a world-renowned baritone. In 1889 she was placed in charge of planning the inaugural concert opening the newly built Lincoln Music Hall, and recruited the BSO for the event.

In 1892, she was responsible for bringing the Czech composer Antonín Dvořák to the United States to head her conservatory, where he remained until 1895. Dvořák, who refused her offer several times, was ultimately persuaded by his wife, Anna Dvorak, when she learned of the staggering annual salary of $15,000, which was 25 times his current income. He was to receive four months' summer leave in exchange for three hours of daily teaching and six annual concerts. It was there that he met 26-year-old African-American student Harry Burleigh. Burleigh, who mopped floors to pay for his tuition, sang spirituals as he worked and drew the interest of Dvorak. Burleigh's rendering of African-American spirituals had a profound effect on Dvorak's compositions and served as the basis for one of his best-known symphonies, (with a title suggested by Thurber, it is said), "From the New World". Dvorak said, "In the Negro melodies of America I discover all that is needed for a great and noble school of music." Burleigh went on to assist Dvorak in copying sections of his work as his amanuensis, and ultimately became a well-known baritone and composer in his own right, as well as a faculty member at the Conservatory.

In addition to race and gender issues, Thurber championed the idea of a federally-funded conservatory and was very pointed about the fact that the United States was the only industrialized nation that did not provide government monies for the arts. Thurber "precipitated public debate over the appropriateness of a federally funded Conservatory of music in a capitalist society". In fact, the Institute of Musical Art of the City of New York, chartered in 1904 with the backing of Andrew Carnegie, was a privately funded institution and became her chief competition, and there is no indication in the public record that they accepted African Americans, people with disabilities, or women. The school ultimately morphed into the Juilliard School. (Carnegie also was a founding patron of Thurber's Conservatory though some research suggests that other than a small amount from L. Horton and Andrew Carnegie, Thurber is the only one who contributed financial backing.)

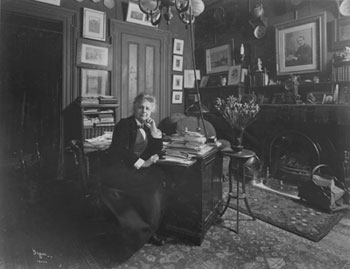
Jeannette Meyers Thurber in her office

Thurber's continuing difficulties in securing funding for her school—either public or private—and her flagging energy as she grew older, contributed to the demise of the school, but her success did as well: music schools started springing up, competing for faculty and students. On the other hand, her school was written out of the record of musical history well before the doors had even closed. "It is conspicuously absent from Elson's National Music of America, written in 1899, nor is there any reference to it in Waldo Selden Pratt's 1909 History of Music, yet the school was still advertising nationally and enrolling hundreds of students."

Scholars suggest it could be because the school had been pigeon-holed as being "specifically successful in helping students of foreign birth and certain special classes, like the blind and those of Negro blood". Or because the orchestra had a "a sprinkling of girls", as the New York Evening Post reported in 1899.

Thurber lived to be almost 96, dying in 1946 as a woman who "combined her love of music with an entrepreneurial imagination, the management skills of the labor negotiator, and a profound dedication to music education—qualities that mark her, even to this day, as one of the most intelligent, effective patrons ever to take a stand for American music".
