= Richard Elwes =

English barrister and judge (1901–1968)

Sir Richard Elwes OBE, TD
- Mr Justice Elwes

Justice of the High Court
- In office 10 January 1958 – 31 December 1965

Personal details
- Born: Richard Everard Augustine Elwes; 28 May 1901
- Died: 4 September 1968 (aged 67)
- Spouse: Mary Freya Sykes (m. 1926)
- Children: 5, including Polly
- Parent(s): Gervase Elwes; Lady Winefride Feilding
- Education: Christ Church, Oxford

Sir Richard Everard Augustine Elwes, OBE, TD (28 May 1901 – 4 September 1968) was an English barrister and High Court judge.

== Biography ==
Elwes was the fifth son of prominent English tenor Gervase Elwes by his wife Lady Winefride Mary Elizabeth, née Feilding, daughter of Rudolph Feilding, 8th Earl of Denbigh. Several of his siblings achieved distinction: among his brothers were a monsignor and Simon Elwes, a prominent painter. He grew up at Billing Hall, Northamptonshire. A Roman Catholic, he was educated at The Oratory School and Christ Church, Oxford.

He was called to the bar at the Inner Temple in 1925 and joined the Midland circuit, and was known for the quality of his advocacy. He was junior to Norman Birkett in several high-profile criminal prosecutions, including those of Alfred Rouse and of Frederick Nodder. He was also standing counsel to the Jockey Club between 1938–50 and a member of the General Council of the Bar.

Elwes was about to take silk in 1939 when the Second World War broke out: Elwes, aged 38, was called up to serve with the Northamptonshire Yeomanry, which he had joined in 1923. Dissatisfied with home duties, he arranged to join the 69th Infantry Brigade as a staff captain and sent to France, and was evacuated to Britain with the British Expeditionary Force in 1940. He spent the rest of the war at the War Office as an assistant adjutant general, in charge of English prisoners of war matters. He was appointed OBE and received the Efficiency Decoration in 1944 and received the American Bronze Star Medal in 1945.

After the war, he returned to the bar, becoming Recorder of Northampton in 1946, a King's Counsel in 1950, and was chairman of quarter sessions of Rutland from 1946 to 1954, of Derbyshire from 1954 to 1958, and of Bedfordshire from 1957 to 1958. In 1958, he was appointed a Justice of the High Court of Justice, assigned to the Queen's Bench Division, and received the customary knighthood. He retired in 1965.

== Family ==
In 1926, Elwes married Mary Freya, née Sykes, elder daughter of Sir Mark Sykes, 6th Baronet; they had two sons and three daughters one of whom was the 1950s TV personality Polly Elwes. He was a devoted Catholic, and was a Knight of Malta.
