= Murder of Mona Tinsley =

British child murder case from 1937

Mona Lilian Tinsley
- Mona Tinsley, c. 1936
- Born: 14 November 1926; Newark-on-Trent, Nottinghamshire, England
- Died: 6 January 1937 (aged 10), c. 7 p.m. Hayton, Nottinghamshire, England
- Cause of death: Asphyxia due to Ligature strangulation
- Body discovered: River Idle, 6 June 1937
- Resting place: Newark Cemetery, Newark-on-Trent, Nottinghamshire, England; 53.0692°N 0.79887°W (approximate)
- Education: Guildhall Street Methodist School, Newark
- Known for: Victim of child murder; Precedent case in abolition of no body, no murder principle
- Parent(s): Wilfred and Lilian Tinsley

Mona Lilian Tinsley (14 November 1926 - 6 January 1937) was a British schoolgirl and the victim of a child murder which resulted in major amendments to the criminal law of England and Wales.

On 5 January 1937, 10-year-old Mona Tinsley disappeared after leaving her Newark-on-Trent school. A former lodger of Mona's parents, Frederick Nodder—known to Mona and her siblings as "Uncle Fred"—became the prime suspect in her abduction and suspected murder. However, despite the fact both strong physical and circumstantial evidence existed attesting to his guilt, because no body could be found, Nodder could not be tried for Mona's murder, but was instead convicted of her abduction and unlawful detainment and sentenced to seven years in gaol.

Mona's strangled body was recovered from the River Idle on 6 June; the discovery of her body enabled authorities to charge Nodder with her murder. He was found guilty of Mona's murder and hanged at Lincoln Prison on 30 December 1937.

The murder of Mona Tinsley was a case study cited in English law as leading to the abolition of the no body, no murder principle. This principle was abolished in 1954. As such, a murder conviction can now be obtained in England and Wales based on sufficiently compelling and convincing circumstantial evidence. Nodder himself has been described by one author as the Man Who Said Nothing due to his refusal to disclose the whereabouts of Mona's body and her subsequent discovery enabling, via contemporary legal statutes, his trial, conviction and execution for her murder.

== Early life ==
Mona Lilian Tinsley was born in Newark-on-Trent, Nottinghamshire, on 14 November 1926. She was the fourth of seven children born to Wilfred Edward and Lilian Ada (née Scott) Tinsley, who had married in 1920. The Tinsley family were working-class and close-knit, and resided in a council house on Thoresby Avenue. Mona's father was employed as a coal deliveryman; her mother was a housewife. To supplement the family income, the Tinsleys occasionally allowed lodgers to rent an upstairs room in their property.

By January 1937, Mona had recently celebrated her tenth birthday. She was slightly short for her age, with a somewhat protective attitude towards her younger siblings, and wore her dark hair in a bobbed cut with a prominent fringe fashionable with girls in the 1930s. Mona's mother later described her middle child as being "a lovely child ... very sharp and intelligent. She was loved by everybody, both at school and [a]round her home."

=== Disappearance ===
On the afternoon of Tuesday 5 January 1937, Mona disappeared shortly after leaving the Guildhall Street Methodist School in Newark-on-Trent to walk home at the end of the school day. Mona's school was approximately twenty minutes' walk from her home, and she would typically walk home either alone, with her younger sister, Edith Brenda, or with friends, arriving home at approximately 4.10 p.m. Several of her classmates later informed police that on this date, Mona began her walk home alone.

When Mona had not arrived home by 4.30 p.m., her parents—having initially assumed their daughter had briefly encountered or visited a friend or relative en route home—became anxious. By 5 p.m., her father, Wilfred, began searching the streets, enquiring in local shops and visiting Mona's friends' homes in the hope of locating his daughter.

That evening, Wilfred and Lilian Tinsley reported their daughter missing to Nottingham City Police, who promised to launch an intense manhunt for the child at daybreak. The following morning, an intense search was mounted, with Chief Constable Harry Barnes assigned overall charge of the investigation. This search involved the questioning of potential eyewitnesses, canals and rivers being dragged, extensive door-to-door enquiries, and empty properties being searched. The police search was assisted by approximately six-hundred local volunteers.

== Investigation ==
One of the initial avenues of police enquiry was to question Mona's classmates; one of whom, William Plackett, informed officers that he had seen Mona standing close to a butcher's shop on Guildhall Street shortly after their school had closed for the day. Plackett also stated Mona had been standing approximately 3 ft (91 cm) from a man he did not recognise, and that the man had seemed wary in demeanour.

In response to extensive police and media appeals, two eyewitnesses also informed investigators on the afternoon of 6 January that they had seen Mona at a bus station the previous afternoon and that she had been in the company of a middle-aged man approximately 45 years old, 5 ft 9 in (180 cm) in height and with a small, ginger moustache. This individual had been wearing a trilby hat and a distinctive fawn raincoat, and the eyewitnesses had seen Mona in the company of this individual at approximately 4.45 p.m. One of these individuals was able to identify this man as a former lodger of the Tinsleys; the other eyewitness—a neighbour of Mona's—stated the man had been notably wary in demeanour.

A neighbour of the Tinsley family, Annie Herd, also informed the police that she had seen a former lodger of the Tinsleys standing alone, loitering on the corner of Guildhall Street, close to Mona's school, staring in the direction of the entrance to the premises on the afternoon of her disappearance. Later that day, a bus conductor named Charles Edward Reville confirmed to police that the previous day, a young girl matching Mona's description had boarded his 4.45 p.m. bus from Newark to Retford in the company of a middle-aged man, and the pair had alighted his bus at Grove Street, Retford, at approximately 6 p.m. Reville added that this man had displayed a return ticket for himself, before purchasing a single half-fare ticket for the girl. Reville's claims were independently substantiated by a passenger on the bus named Stanley Betts, who also claimed to have seen a middle-aged man travelling between Newark and Retford with a girl matching Mona's description.

=== Suspect identification ===
Police questioning of Mona's parents in relation to these eyewitness statements revealed this former lodger's name to be Frederick Hudson, with Lilian Tinsley adding that they had been introduced to Hudson in 1935 by her sister, Edith Grimes, with whom Hudson had previously lodged in Sheffield. The Tinsleys explained that after Hudson left the Grimes household in October 1935, he had briefly lodged with them, but that they had evicted him from their home after just three weeks for non-payment of rent. Nonetheless, Wilfred and Lilian Tinsley emphasized that his departure from their household had been upon amicable terms, adding that in the short space of time Hudson had lodged in their household, he had been popular with their seven children, who had all come to know him as "Uncle Fred".

In efforts to locate Hudson's current address, investigators contacted Edith Grimes, who stated the man her sister knew as Frederick Hudson was actually a 49-year-old father-of-two named Frederick Nodder (b. 21 August 1887), who had adopted the surname Hudson as an alias, since becoming the subject of an affiliation order. Grimes described Nodder as being a brutish and squalid drunkard with poor personal hygiene and few friends, who worked primarily as a motor mechanic and lorry driver in Retford. Nodder had, Grimes stated, deserted his wife many years before he had lodged with her. However, she claimed to be unaware of Nodder's current address, and to have not seen him for several months. (Note: This claim was contradicted by a neighbour of the Grimes family, who recalled seeing a lorry driver fitting Nodder's description at their home shortly after Christmas 1936.) Enquiries in public houses and garages in Retford quickly led officers to the Retford haulage firm with which Nodder had been employed; this firm was able to provide police with Nodder's current address on Smeath Road in the Nottinghamshire village of Hayton, adding he had ceased working for the firm on 29 December. (Note: Nodder had resided at this address since June 1936.)

== Formal questioning ==
In the late evening of 6 January, police drove from Newark-on-Trent to Hayton to formally question Nodder. When shown a photograph of Mona and asked if he knew the child, Nodder confirmed he did indeed "used to" know her, but claimed not to have seen Mona for approximately fifteen months, following his eviction from the Tinsley household. When informed the child was missing, Nodder replied: "I know nothing at all about it." Questioned as to his movements the previous day, Nodder confirmed he had been in Newark, but claimed that he had simply been looking for haulage work in the town. He further claimed to have returned to Retford alone on the 3.45 p.m. bus (approximately ten minutes before Mona is believed to have been abducted), arriving in Hayton later in the afternoon.

Frederick Nodder, pictured in January 1937

Police questioning of Nodder's neighbours produced a witness who had seen a young girl matching Mona's description at Nodder's premises earlier that day; another neighbour, Doreen Jarman, was able to confirm to police that at midday on 6 January, a young brunette girl wearing a pale blue dress had been standing in the back doorway of his house, watching Nodder digging in his garden. The combination of eyewitness testimony and circumstantial evidence was sufficient to detain Nodder pending further enquiries. He was arrested on a bastardy warrant at 11 p.m. that evening (police having learned from Edith Grimes that Nodder had been the subject of an affiliation order), and both his three-bedroom home (known as "Peacehaven") and garden extensively searched. Over the following days, every house, drain, ditch and cesspit within a three-mile radius of Nodder's property was also searched.

=== Initial statement ===
On the morning of 7 January, Nodder was placed in an identity parade at Newark police station; each of the witnesses who had seen Mona on 5 and 6 January did not hesitate to pick him out as the man they had seen in her company. Confronted with these positive identifications, Nodder changed his story the following morning, informing a Detective Sergeant Francis to bring Edith Grimes to the station, stating: "If you will get Mrs. Grimes to see me, I'll make a statement which will lead to the finding of Mona Tinsley alive and well."

In his initial statement, given on the evening of 8 January, Nodder claimed he had encountered Mona by chance outside her school, and that upon recognizing him, Mona had cheerfully exclaimed, "Hullo, Uncle Fred!" before asking him to take her to visit her aunt (Edith Grimes) in Sheffield in order that she could see her newborn cousin, whom she had not yet seen. Reluctantly, he had agreed to Mona's request, as he had expected to see Mrs. Grimes the following day as the two had an agreement to meet every Wednesday via their affair. He had therefore allowed Mona to spend the evening at his home before giving the child two shillings and travelling with her on a bus "from Retford to "Worksop" in the early evening of 6 January, with instructions—both verbal and written—as to how to reach her aunt's home in Neill Road, Sheffield, and a note of explanation for her visit to Mrs. Grimes. He had then returned back home to Hayton by bus. This arrangement would therefore ensure Nodder was alone when Mrs. Grimes visited him at their pre-scheduled meeting time, and that upon Edith's return to Sheffield, Mona would already be with her family at her home. Nodder further stated Edith Grimes could assist police with their investigation; adding she had known his address but alleging she had withheld this information from the police. (Note: Edith Grimes subsequently admitted to police she and Nodder had engaged in an affair and had known his address, but adamantly denied all other claims and accusations in Nodder's statement.)

Upon Edith Grimes's arrival at Newark police station, Nodder asked her, "Is Mona at your house?" When she replied the child was not, Nodder replied, "Well, I am responsible."

=== Further developments ===
The police search outside the grounds of Peacehaven proved fruitless insofar as locating Mona either alive or dead, or determining whether she had been at the property; however, the search inside Nodder's home revealed a handkerchief later determined as having belonged to Mona near a cylindrical water tank at the rear of the premises. Also discovered inside the house were scraps of paper depicting a child's drawings and writings, and fingerprints recovered from crockery in the kitchen were quickly matched to samples taken from materials Mona was known to have handled at her home. Furthermore, an opened packet of boiled sweets, two soiled handkerchiefs, and a tin of Vaseline were discovered hidden beneath a pillow in the front bedroom of the premises, indicating a likely sexual motive for the child's abduction. (Note: Some evidence exists to suggest Frederick Nodder had been a paedophile, and that during the three weeks he had lodged within the Tinsley household in late 1935, he had developed a sexual obsession with Mona.)

== Abduction and detainment charge ==
Although the extensive searches conducted in and around Newark, Retford and Hayton had failed to find any trace of Mona by 10 January 1937 and remained ongoing, the evidence retrieved within Nodder's home, plus admissions within—and independent corroborating statements supporting—Nodder's witness statement proved sufficient for him to be charged with Mona's abduction on this date. In response, Nodder proclaimed, "I didn't take her away by force!" He was formally charged with Mona's abduction and unlawful detainment on 25 January, and committed to stand trial at Birmingham Assizes the following month.

=== Assistance of Scotland Yard ===
Despite Nodder's insistence that Mona had come to no harm, police were certain the child was dead. On the morning Nodder was to be charged with Mona's abduction and unlawful detainment, Chief Constable Barnes requested the formal assistance of Scotland Yard in the search for her body. Chief Inspector Leonard Burt and Detective Sergeant William Skardon arrived in Hayton on the evening of 25 January, and the two immediately organised an extensive search of every landmark and piece of terrain within three miles of Peacehaven, with a twenty-mile stretch of the Chesterfield Canal—just thirty feet (9.1 m) from Nodder's home—also dredged, and one mile of the canal completely drained. This search was again assisted by hundreds of volunteers and several search dogs, and was at the time one of the most extensive in British police history, although the search would ultimately prove fruitless. Both local and national media devoted extensive coverage to the ongoing investigation, publishing a photograph and physical description of the child in their appeals for assistance from the public.

Before Chief Inspector Burt and Detective Sergeant Skardon returned to London, they informed their counterparts of their conviction Mona's body had been thrown into the River Idle, and of their fears the child's body may have been swept into the North Sea.

"As I took it [Mona's silk dress] from its wrappings and held the soft material in my hands, I knew at once that Mona was dead ... Mona spoke to me, saying she had been taken to a small house where she had been strangled. She gave me a picture of a house, with a water-filled ditch on one side, a field at its back, a church close by, and an inn within sight. In my vision ... I was taken to a graveyard, over a bridge, and across some fields to a river beyond. There I stopped, unable to go further."

— Section of spiritualist medium Estelle Roberts' recollections of her communications with Mona Tinsley, as published in her biography, Fifty Years a Medium.

=== Medium assistance ===
Several days after Mona's disappearance, a renowned spiritualist medium named Estelle Roberts penned a letter to the Chief Constable of Newark, offering her assistance in locating the child upon the condition her involvement remained confidential and adding that if the chief constable accepted her services and conditions, to mail her some items of clothing the child had worn. With the agreement of Mona's parents, Chief Constable Barnes mailed an item of Mona's clothing to Roberts.

Upon handling a pink silk dress Mona had worn shortly before her disappearance, Roberts immediately knew the child was dead. She promptly informed Newark police that Mona had been murdered, adding that she had been taken to a small house with a water-filled ditch on one side, and that she had spent much of her time within the front room of this household copying "something out of a book" (police had neither informed Roberts or disclosed to the media that scraps of children's drawings and writings had been discovered at Peacehaven). Roberts stated the child had been raped, then strangled to death in the corner of an upstairs bedroom of the house to which she had been taken before her murderer had placed her body in a sack and exited the house through "a side door". (Note: Several weeks prior to abducting Mona, Nodder had permanently nailed shut the front door of the house.) He had then transported her remains a considerable distance "past a row of trees, through a graveyard to a little bridge over some water and along a narrow lane deep with mud" towards a river, adding the route Mona's murderer had taken was beyond the field which existed behind the house where she had been murdered. Roberts informed the police that Mona's body had been "thrown into" the water at this location, adding "You will find the child's body there."

== Abduction trial ==
Nodder was brought to trial for the abduction of Mona Tinsley at the Victoria Law Courts in Birmingham on 9 March 1937. He was tried before Mr. Justice Swift, facing nine separate charges including the taking of Mona by fraud with the intent of depriving her father of possession of her; of detaining her by fraud; of decoying and enticing her into his possession; of unlawfully detaining the child; and of unlawfully stealing and carrying away the child and secreting her against the wishes of her father. Nodder pleaded not guilty to each charge, and chose not to testify throughout the trial.

The prosecution was conducted by Norman Birkett KC, and Richard Elwes KC, who could only legally argue that Nodder had abducted the child against the will of her father. Several witnesses were called to substantiate this prosecution contention.

Nodder was defended by Maurice Healy KC and Nigel Robinson KC, who reiterated Nodder's claims that Mona had spent one night at his home before he had given the child two shillings and both verbal and written instructions as to how to travel to her aunt's Sheffield home the following evening, and that he had not seen her since the two had parted company in Worksop. Healy and Robinson further argued that Mona may still be found alive and well, and that no-one should speculate as to her actual fate without proof of her current whereabouts. In reference to Nodder's refusal to testify, Healy stated his client could offer nothing beyond the testimony and evidence produced which could assist the jury in their deliberations by testifying.

=== Sentencing ===
Nodder's abduction trial lasted two days, concluding on 10 March. The jury deliberated for sixteen minutes before convicting Nodder of all nine charges pertaining to Mona's abduction. When asked by the judge if he had any statement to make in response to the jury's verdict, Nodder replied, "No, sir." In response, judge Swift paid reference to Nodder's refusal to testify at his trial and the jury's verdict, stating: "You have been most properly, in my opinion, convicted by the jury of a dreadful crime" before adding: "Nobody knows what has become of that little girl ... Whatever happened to her, how she fared, who looked after her, where she slept. There is one person in this court who knows, and he is silent ... he is silent! He says nothing to you at all ... The witness box is there—open and free. He sits there and never tells you a word."

Upon passing sentence, Mr. Justice Swift stated: "What you did with that little girl, what became of her, only you know. It may be that time will reveal the dreadful secret you carry in your breast. I cannot tell, but, I am determined that, as far as I have part or lot in that dreadful tragedy of 5 January and 6 January, I will keep you in custody." Nodder was sentenced to seven years' penal servitude, to be served at Lincoln Prison. He did appeal the severity of this sentence, although his appeal was dismissed in June 1937.

Investigators recover the body of Mona Tinsley from the River Idle on 6 June 1937

Underwater search and recovery personnel recover Mona's tweed coat and Wellington boot from riverbed of the Idle, 7 June 1937

== Body discovery ==
On the afternoon of 6 June 1937, a family boating on the River Idle in Bawtry spotted a partially submerged object in the water, close to the bank. Upon closer inspection, these individuals discovered that the object was the partially decomposed body of a child, with the head and upper torso embedded in silt and trapped in a drain below water level. The body had been weighted down with sections of wood and metal, with only the lower trunk and legs floating above the surface of the water.

The following day, an underwater search unit discovered a child's double-breasted tweed coat and a single Wellington boot. A torn and rotting sack which had evidently been used to transport the child's body was also recovered from the banks of the river. The location of these discoveries was approximately eight miles from where Nodder had lived, and thirty-two miles from the Tinsley household. (Note: Police had previously searched sections of the River Idle for Mona's body, although these searches had proven unsuccessful.) Landmarks within the vicinity closely matched those described by Estelle Roberts to police as being within the environs where Mona's body would be discovered.

=== Autopsy ===
The child's body was initially moved to the outhouse of a nearby inn, where the clothing present with the body was identified by Wilfred Tinsley as belonging to his daughter. The following morning, Dr James Webster conducted a preliminary examination of the body at the inn before the body was transported from Newington to the Retford Mortuary, to undergo a formal autopsy by both Dr Webster and Home Office Pathologist Sir Bernard Spilsbury. This autopsy revealed the cause of death to be asphyxiation due to ligature strangulation, that Mona's assailant had most likely strangled her from behind, that death would have occurred in less than five minutes, and that she had been dead before entering the water. Furthermore Mona had not eaten any solid food for at least twelve hours prior to her murder.

Due to the extensive period of time the body had been in the river, the extensive adipocere formation upon the corpse prevented the pathologist from being able to determine whether Mona had been sexually assaulted before her murder, although deep bite marks resultant from her strangulation were still evident upon her tongue, which protruded beyond the tooth margin. Furthermore, Webster and Spilsbury concluded Mona's body had been immersed beneath water for a minimum of three months.

Mona Tinsley's coffin is transported to Newark Cemetery, 10 June 1937

=== Funeral ===
Mona Tinsley was laid to rest on the morning of 10 June 1937. Her interment followed services at her local Methodist Church, where Mona had attended Sunday school. Several hundred people lined the streets as the funeral cortège proceeded from the Methodist Church to Newark Cemetery. Her body was interred in an elm coffin adorned with red and white roses and evergreen. Contemporary news reports indicate Lilian Tinsley only spoke the words, "Mona, God bless her" as her daughter's coffin was lowered into her grave.

Nodder was formally charged with having committed the wilful murder with malice aforethought of Mona Tinsley at the Nottingham Assizes on 29 July. He declined the magistrates' offer to cross-examine the sole individual to testify against him at the hearing but again requested, and was granted, legal aid.

== Murder trial ==
Four months after Nodder had been formally charged with Mona's murder, he again appeared at Nottingham Assizes, to be tried for her murder. This second trial began before Mr. Justice Macnaghten on 22 November 1937, and again saw Norman Birkett appear on behalf of the prosecution, and Maurice Healy on behalf of the defence. Nodder again pleaded not guilty to the charges.

In his opening statement on behalf of the prosecution, Birkett outlined the circumstances surrounding Mona's abduction and the police investigation into her disappearance ultimately culminating in Nodder's arrest and conviction for her abduction prior to the discovery of her body enabling his retrial for her murder. Birkett further stated the prosecution intended to prove that Nodder had committed the murder on the evening of 6 January, but that they did not have to prove his actual motive for the crime, stating: "The springs of human motives are hidden from the eyes of man. What goes on in a man's heart is frequently known only to himself ... deeds of darkness are done in the dark with no human eye to behold and to see" before concluding his opening statement by emphasizing that the circumstantial evidence to be presented was of "great strength" to the prosecution's case.

Referencing the demonstrable inconsistencies in Nodder's statement to investigators that he had placed Mona on a bus to Sheffield on 6 January, five months prior to the discovery of the child's body in the River Idle, Birkett stated to the jurors: "If you come to the conclusion that [the discovery of Mona's body] plainly indicates that that [statement] told by Nodder, after reflection, was a lie, then it may assist you in regard to the other evidence."

Maurice Healy argued that his client had no actual motive to commit Mona's murder; he advanced the theory that Mona had actually been abducted by another, unknown individual while travelling alone upon the bus to Sheffield which Nodder remained adamant he had placed the child upon, and that this individual had committed the murder at a location in or near Worksop. Healy further asserted that the location of Mona's discovery supported this contention, arguing that Mona's actual murderer had placed her body into a sack and thrown her body into the River Ryton—a tributary river to the River Idle which passes through Worksop and Sheffield—and that the current of the river had transported her body from the Ryton into the Idle. The location where Mona's body was ultimately found, Healy emphasized, was approximately one mile from the location where the Ryton flows into the Idle, and the tributary river itself travelled "through banks, parks, domains and quiet places" and had not been dredged by police in their initial searches for Mona.

Among the many prosecution witnesses to testify was bus conductor Charles Reville, who testified that a young girl matching Mona's description had boarded his bus in the company of a man whom he positively identified as Nodder. Reville further testified that Nodder had a return ticket for himself, and purchased a single ticket for the girl. Also to testify at this second trial was Sir Bernard Spilsbury, who testified that Mona had been strangled from behind with a ligature such as a bootlace or a cord of similar diameter to a bootlace which had been drawn behind her head, then tightened. Spilsbury further testified that the deep bite marks still evident upon Mona's tongue at the time of the discovery of her body indicated the child had bitten her tongue for an extended period of time as this act of strangulation had occurred. He also refuted defence contentions Mona's death may have been accidental due to her accidentally falling from a tree and strangling herself with her dress, stating: "From what I could see of [Mona's] clothing, there was no narrow band around the neck."

=== Defendant's testimony ===
Nodder chose to testify on the second day of his trial; he reiterated his previous claims to investigators that he had been in Newark on 5 January to speak with an acquaintance about a haulier vacancy, but had missed their appointment and had begun "sauntering about [Newark] to kill time" before encountering Mona by chance. He remained adamant he had not seen Mona after he had placed her on a bus at Worksop with view to her visiting her aunt and newborn cousin in Sheffield before he had visited a local pub, then returned home, but did concede to having been "foolish" in taking her "so far" from her home without her parents' knowledge or consent.

In response to questioning from both the prosecution and defence, Nodder denied killing Mona; adhering to his defence counsel's allegation that she had been murdered by an unknown individual after he had last seen her on 6 January and claiming that he "thought too much" of the child to consider harming her. He also claimed to have thought it better to allow the child to travel alone to her aunt's Sheffield home rather than accompany her back to her mother's—adding the hour had been "too late" for him to have done so by the time he had made this decision.

=== Conviction ===
This second trial lasted just two days. Both counsels delivering their closing arguments to the jury on the afternoon of 23 November before Mr. Justice Macnaghten delivered his summary instructions to the jury, stating: "You know that the murder—if murder there was—must have been committed between noon on 6 January and 9 o'clock on the evening of that day. If Nodder committed the murder of this child, he did it between those hours." Judge Macnaghten then referenced the warnings outlined by Maurice Healy in his closing argument, instructing the jurors to dispel any preconceived emotions or opinions pertaining to the case and the defendant in their deliberations, before outlining the two questions the jury must consider: Was Mona's death a result of murder, or accidental; and if murder, were they satisfied beyond a reasonable doubt Nodder was responsible. The jury then retired to consider their verdict.

The jurors deliberated for just seventy-five minutes before finding Nodder guilty. When given the opportunity to speak after hearing the jury's verdict, Nodder stood before the judge, before declaring in a low but firm tone: "I shall go out of this court with a clear conscience."

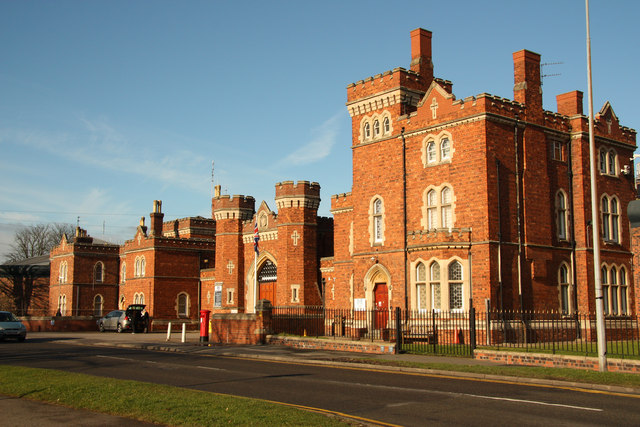
HMP Lincoln. Nodder was executed within the grounds of this prison on the morning of 30 December 1937

In passing the death sentence, Macnaghten informed Nodder: "Justice has slowly, but surely, overtaken you, and it only remains for me to pronounce the sentence which the law and justice require." Nodder smiled as he heard Mr. Justice Macnaghten pass the death sentence.

== Execution ==
Frederick Nodder never formally confessed to Mona's murder. He did launch an appeal against his conviction, contending that the evidence presented against him at his trial was purely circumstantial and therefore inconclusive of his guilt, that extensive pretrial publicity had effectively prejudiced the jurors, and that in delivering his summary to the jury, Mr. Justice Macnaghten had failed to place sufficient emphasis on particular evidence—thus misdirecting the jury prior to their deliberations. His appeal was heard before Lord Chief Justice Gordon Hewart, Mr. Justice Branson and Mr. Justice Porter at the Court of Appeal on 13 December, but was dismissed the same day, with Lord Hewart declaring: "I say without hesitation that in his most admirable and careful summing-up, every relevant warning was given to the jury and the theory of the defence was fully dealt with. The judge marshalled all the evidence in a perfectly clear case and there is nothing in this appeal except that it arises from a charge of murder. The appeal is dismissed."

Nodder remained nonchalant upon hearing Lord Hewart dismiss his appeal; he was hanged at Lincoln Prison at 9 a.m. on 30 December 1937. His executioners were Tom Pierrepoint and Stanley Cross. Approximately 200 members of the public were present outside the prison entrance at the time the official notification of Nodder's execution was confirmed, although contemporary news reports indicate few of the men present, if any, removed their hats in a gesture of respect.

== See also ==
- Capital punishment in the United Kingdom
- Child abduction – Unauthorized removal of a minor
- Child Sexual Abuse – Form of child abuse
- Corpus delicti – Conviction requires proof of a crime
- Criminal law of England and Wales – Legal system of England and Wales relating to crime
- HM Prison Lincoln
- List of executioners
- List of solved missing person cases (pre-1950)
- Murder conviction without a body – Conviction on circumstantial evidence

== Cited works and further reading ==
- Adams, Paul (2012). Ghosts & Gallows: True Stories of Crime and the Paranormal. Cheltenham: History Press. ISBN 978-0-752-46339-1.
- Browne, Douglas Gordon (1952). The Scalpel of Scotland Yard: The Life of Sir Bernard Spilsbury. Manhattan: Dutton Publishing. ASIN B0007DP5JQ.
- Browne, Douglas Gordon; Tullett, Tom (1989). Bernard Spilsbury: His Life and Cases. Dorchester: Dorset Press. ISBN 978-0-856-17216-8.
- Butler, Ivan (1973). Murderers' England. London: Robert Hale. ISBN 978-0-7091-4054-2.
- Cudlipp, Hugh (1976). Walking on the Water. London: The Bodley Head. ISBN 978-0-370-11313-5.
- Burt, Leonard (1959). Commander Burt of Scotland Yard. London: William Heinemann Ltd. ASIN B001GCVXC0.
- Duke, Winifred (1995) [1950]. The Trials of Frederick Nodder: The Mona Tinsley Case. London: William Hodge and Company. ISBN 978-1-561-69182-1.
- Fido, Martin (1995). Twentieth Century Murder: A Year by Year Account of the World's Most Pitiless Crimes. London: Bracken Books. ISBN 978-1-858-91390-2.
- Frasier, David K. (1996). Murder Cases of the Twentieth Century: Biographies and Bibliographies of 280 Convicted or Accused Killers. North Carolina: McFarland & Co. ISBN 978-1-476-60808-2.
- Gaute, J. H. H.; Odell, Robin (1991). The New Murderers' Who's Who. Dorchester, Dorset: Dorset Press. ISBN 978-0-880-29582-6.
- Haines, Max (2004). Instruments of Murder. Ontario: Viking Canada. ISBN 978-0-670-04480-1.
- Hazelgrove, Jenny (2000). Spiritualism and British Society Between the Wars. Manchester: Manchester University Press. ISBN 978-0-719-05559-1.
- Hodge, James H. (1994) [1962]. Famous Trials: Thurtell and Hunt, Frederick Nodder, Peter Barnes and Others. Middlesex: Penguin Books. ISBN 978-0-140-01775-5.
- Jaffe, Frederick A. (1991). A Guide to Pathological Evidence for Lawyers and Police Officers. London: Thomson Professional Publishing. ISBN 978-04-59-35791-7.
- Lane, Brian (1988). The Murder Club Guide to the Midlands. London: George G. Harrap and Co. ISBN 978-0-245-54681-5.
- Lane, Brian (1993). Chronicle of 20th Century Murder. London: Virgin Publishing. ISBN 978-1-85227-436-8.
- Lane, Brian (1991). The Murder Guide: 100 Extraordinary, Bizarre and Gruesome Murders. London: Robinson Publishing Ltd. ISBN 978-1-85487-083-4.
- Lustgarten, Edgar (1961). The Judges and the Judged. London: Odhams Press. ASIN B0000CKZWD.
- Newton, Michael (2002). The Encyclopedia of Kidnappings. New York City: Facts on File, Inc. ISBN 978-1-438-12988-4.
- Roberts, Estelle (2006). Fifty Years a Medium. Worksop: SDU Publications. ISBN 978-1-905-96103-0.
- Rose, Andrew (2007). Lethal Witness: Sir Bernard Spilsbury Honorary Pathologist. Stroud: Sutton Publishing. ISBN 978-0-750-94422-9.
- Scott-Davies, Allan (2011). Death on the Waterways. Cheltenham: The History Press. ISBN 978-0-752-47267-6.
- Wade, Stephen (2009). Hanged at Lincoln. Cheltenham: The History Press. ISBN 978-0-750-95242-2.
- Webb, Simon (1995). "The Monster with Staring Eyes". True Detective (Summer 1995 edition). United Kingdom: The Forum Press. ISSN 0041-350X.
- Williams, Glanville Llwellyn (1955). The Proof of Guilt: A Study of the English Criminal Trial. Devon: Stevens Books. ISBN 978-0-420-38320-4.
- Wilson, Colin (1992). Murder in the 1930s. New York: Caroll & Graf. ISBN 978-0-881-84855-7.
- Wilson, Colin; Pitman, Patricia (1986) [1962]. Encyclopedia of Murder. New York City: Putnam Publishing. ISBN 978-0-330-28300-7.
- Wright, William (2019). British Murder: A Compendium: 1901-2000. Stroud: Amberley Publishing. ISBN 978-1-445-68725-4.
- Wynn, Douglas (1996). On Trial for Murder. London: Pan Books. ISBN 978-0-09472-990-2.
