= Polly Elwes =

British television presenter (1928–1987)

- Born: Mary Freya Elwes; 29 February 1928; London, England
- Died: 15 July 1987 (aged 59); Newbury, Berkshire, England
- Education: Royal Central School of Speech and Drama
- Occupations: Broadcaster; Stage actress
- Years active: 1950–1977
- Spouse: Peter Dimmock (m. 1960; died 1987)
- Children: 3

Polly Elwes, born Mary Freya Elwes (29 February 1928 – 15 July 1987) was an English television and radio broadcaster and stage actress.

She was the first woman roving reporter for the early evening programme Tonight, was a panellist on the television panel game What's My Line?, the music and quiz show Juke Box Jury, and the music quiz game Face the Music.

== Early life and theatre career ==
Mary Freya Elwes was born in London into a Roman Catholic land-owning family on 29 February 1928. Her father, Richard Elwes, was a High Court Judge, her grandfather was the Victorian era tenor Gervase Elwes, and her mother was part of the Sykes family. Elwes had a brother. She was brought up in Sledmere, East Riding of Yorkshire. She was educated at Poles Convent, Ware, from which she was expelled for being an "undesirable influence" on other girls, and went on to train as an actress at the Central School of Speech and Drama. Determined to become a stage actor, she joined the Windsor Theatre Royal repertory company as a stage actress and stage manager. Elwes had a role as the wife of the landlord in the West End comedy For Better For Worse that lasted for 18 months at the Comedy Theatre in London. She also provided skating dubbing for the Wembley pantomime Aladdin on Ice, and also worked as a shopgirl. In February 1957, Elwes became stage director of The Gift play for the Association of Contact Lens Practitioners at the New Chelsea Art Theatre Company. She produced the 1959 romantic comedy play Who Goes There? at St. George's Hall, London.

== Television career ==
After no further offers of plays were presented to her, she later focused on television but was not initially successful.

She was in such television plays as Until the Morning in September 1950 and Val Gielgud's Party Manners in October 1950 and The Wonder in August 1954. In 1956, Elwes suggested to the BBC that a programme that she thought of on those born on 29 February. This was agreed on by the producer Michael Barsley and was called Looking and Leaping. She herself was a subject of the programme, her first presenting role, and worked on in with Cecil Madden. This impressed the BBC's editor of women's programmes enough for Elwes to be made a compere of the television show Woman's Hour. In November 1956, Elwes served as a guest announcer on television for a week from 20 November and later joined as a regular guest announcer.

She later became an announcer for the early evening programme Tonight in 1957 and adopted contact lenses in lieu of spectacles, becoming one the first individuals on television to adopt them because she was short sighted and resented wearing spectacles to read the teleprompter despite the hay fever and sinus problems stopping her from being comfortable wearing them. Elwes was the first woman roving television reporter for Tonight, and conducted interviews on the afternoon television show Your Own Time. In July 1958, Elwes was a commentator of a ceremony at the palace forecourt of Holyrood Palace for BBC Scotland. She worked as a member of the Panorama current affairs programme team covering the 1959 United Kingdom general election. Elwes was a panellist on the television panel game What's My Line? from December 1959 to October 1960. In 1961, she discussed the issues of purchasing a property on Domestic Forum and introduced Rooms in View. Elwes was a contributor to What's New? programme from 1962, and was a panellist on Juke Box Jury from October of the same year to December 1964. She was a presenter of the BBC Home Service radio show In Town Today, and of the BBC Light Programme series Melody Fare.

In August 1965, Elwes made her first non-BBC television appearance on the ITV Rediffusion music and quiz show Sixpence. In the late 1960s, she introduced the radio series That Takes Me Back in which voices of notable individuals of the past were broadcast. Elwes presented the BBC 2 motoring programme Wheelbase from 1967 to 1971 and Home This Afternoon on the BBC Home Service for six years. In 1968, she introduced the 26-part ITV schools series How We Used to Live. Elwes went on to appear in the television play Invasion in Thirty-Minute Theatre and narrate the documentary The Extravagant Story of the Motor Car with Peter West the following year. She read The Rebels of Journey's End on Jackanory in 1970, and presented the religious programme Stars on Sunday on Yorkshire Television. In 1972, Elwes began appearing as a panellist on the music quiz game Face the Music, the Thames Television beauty programme Let's Face It and the Tyne Tees series Talking Hands teaching communication to the deaf.

She was the interviewer on the ITV programme A Place in the Country in 1973, began co-presenting the BBC 1 series I See What You Mean for deaf people and those who work and live with them with Richard Baker in 1975 as well as the Anglia Television factual series A Ripe Old Age with Andrew Cruickshank on the subject of ageing in 1976.

== Personal life and death ==
She was married to the head of BBC outside television broadcasts Peter Dimmock from 12 March 1960 until her death. In 1962 their home in Campden Hill Gardens, Kensington, West London, was featured in an article in Homes & Gardens magazine. They had three children. Elwes lived in the United States when her husband began working in the country in 1977. She died on 15 July 1987, at her home in Newbury, Berkshire, after 11 years of bone cancer. A requiem mass was held for Elwes at the Our Lady of Mount Carmel and St Simon Stock on 6 October 1987.

== Awards ==
She was voted the Best Female TV Personality in March 1959.
