= Our Lady of Perpetual Succour Church, Great Billing =

Our Lady of Perpetual Succour Church
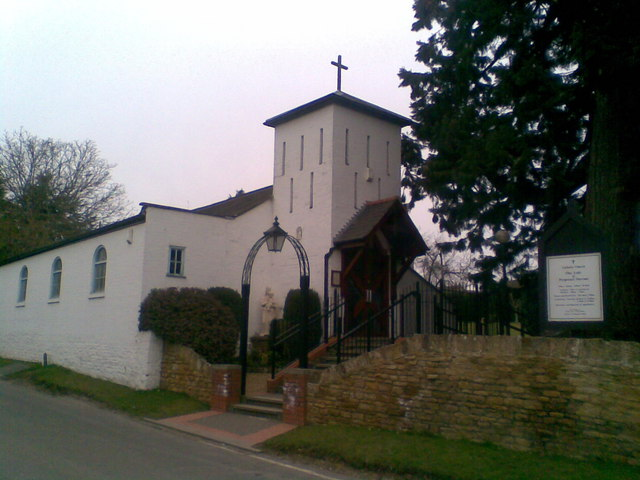
- Our Lady of Perpetual Succour Church
- 52.257638°N 0.813027°W
- Location: Billing
- Country: England
- Denomination: Roman Catholic
- Website: SacredHeartNorthampton.org.uk

History
- Status: Active
- Founder: Valentine Cary Elwes
- Dedication: Our Lady of Perpetual Succour

Architecture
- Functional status: Parish church
- Style: Romanesque Revival
- Completed: 1878

Administration
- Province: Westminster
- Diocese: Northampton
- Deanery: Northampton
- Parish: Our Lady of Perpeutal Succour

Our Lady of Perpetual Succour Church or Our Lady's Church is a Catholic parish church in Great Billing, Northamptonshire, England. It was built in 1878 and founded by the descendants of John Elwes at Billing Hall in the Romanesque Revival style. It is located on the High Street in Billing. Since 2006, it has been the diocesan shrine to Our Lady of Perpetual Succour.

== History ==
=== Foundation ===
In 1795, Robert Cary Elwes, a family member of John Elwes, bought Billing Hall. In 1866, his grandson, Valentine Cary Elwes inherited the hall. He was the father of Gervase Elwes and Dudley Cary-Elwes, who was later the Catholic Bishop of Northampton. In 1874, the family converted to Catholicism. Shortly afterwards, a chapel was built in Billing Hall.

=== Construction ===
In 1878, Our Lady of Perpetual Help was built. It replaced the chapel in the hall and was paid for by Valentine Cary Elwes. It was built in the Romanesque Revival style and has a handcrafted copy of the icon of Our Lady of Perpetual Help installed above the altar. In 1926, the aisles were added. In 1994, an aedicula was added to the Lady Chapel. It was built by Ormsby of Scarisbrick who also did work on Our Lady of Sorrows Church in Bognor Regis. On 8 September 2006, Peter Doyle the Bishop of Northampton made the church the Diocesan Shrine of Our Lady of Perpetual Succour.

Buried in the church cemetery are Valentine Cary Elwes, Gervase Elwes, Bishop Dudley Cary-Elwes and Gervase's son and parish priest of Our Lady's Church, Monsignor Valentine Elwes.

== Parish ==
The parish of Our Lady of Perpetual Succour is in a partnership with the parish of Sacred Heart Church in Weston Favell. Our Lady's Church has one Sunday Mass at 9:15am. Sacred Heart Church has two Sunday Masses at 5:30pm on Saturday and at 10:30am.
