= Alfred Rouse =

British murderer (1894–1931)

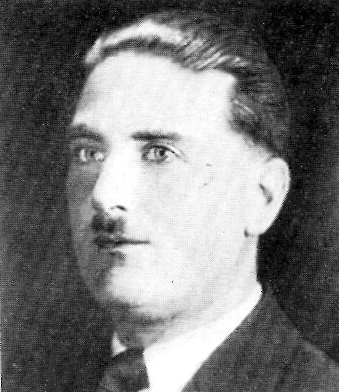
- Alfred Arthur Rouse c. 1930
- Born: 6 April 1894; London, England
- Died: 10 March 1931 (aged 36); HMP Bedford, Bedfordshire, England
- Cause of death: Execution by hanging
- Other name: The Blazing Car Murderer
- Occupation: Commercial traveller
- Spouse: Lily May Rouse (née Watkins)
- Status: Executed
- Conviction: Murder
- Penalty: Death

Alfred Arthur Rouse (6 April 1894 – 10 March 1931) was a British murderer, known as the Blazing Car Murderer, who was convicted and subsequently hanged at Bedford Gaol for the November 1930 murder of an unknown man in Hardingstone, Northamptonshire. Rouse's crime became known as the "Blazing Car Murder" due to the fact Rouse, seeking to fabricate his own death, burned to death an unknown hitchhiker whom he had rendered unconscious inside his car.

The murder was notable because the identity of the victim has never been established, resulting in Rouse being tried, convicted and executed for the murder of an unknown man. Despite recent DNA testing, the identity of the victim still remains unknown.

== Early life ==
Alfred Arthur Rouse was born in Milkwood Road, Herne Hill, London, on 6 April 1894, (Note: At his trial, Rouse declared to the judge: "I have always understood that I was thirty-six, but I have no proof of that.") one of three children born to an English father and an Irish mother. His father, Walter, was a hosier, whereas his mother was reportedly an actress who deserted her husband and children in 1900. Following his wife's leaving the household, Rouse's father had little time for his children; consequently, Rouse and his two siblings were largely raised by an aunt on his father's side. Rouse was known as a well-behaved child; he and his siblings attended a local council school where he was regarded as a bright and athletic student. A member of the Church of England, Rouse would later become a sacristan at St Saviour's Church in Stoke Newington.

Upon leaving school at age 14, Rouse worked briefly as an office boy for an estate agent, then found more secure employment at a textile manufacturing firm. He worked at this firm for five years before training as a carpenter, all the while furthering his education by attending numerous evening classes. In addition, Rouse had a substantial musical gift, sang well, and learned how to play various musical instruments, becoming a proficient pianist, violinist, and mandolinist. Rouse's exceptional baritone voice ensured that he regularly sang at his evening classes. In 1909, Rouse obtained employment at a West End furniture manufacturer. Shortly afterwards, he became acquainted with a young clerk named Lily May Watkins, whom he first met at a local dance and with whom he began a relationship.

== Wartime service ==
Just four days after the outbreak of World War I, Rouse enlisted in the British Army and was assigned to the 24th Queen's Regiment as a Private. While training in England before his departure for France, Rouse married his fiancée. This ceremony was conducted at St Saviour's Church, St Albans, on 29 November.

Rouse arrived in France on 15 March 1915, and was stationed in Paris for some weeks before his unit was sent into battle. He would serve with distinction, although he is known to have fathered an illegitimate child during this time. Rouse's unit was then committed to the Battle of Festubert in Artois, which began on 15 May. In a bayonet attack, Rouse came face to face with a German soldier and lunged at him but missed; the memory of waiting just for an instant for the enemy riposte would remain with him for the rest of his life, and his sleep would be plagued by nightmares.

On the last day of the Battle of Festubert (and just ten weeks after his arrival in France), Rouse sustained wounds to his head, knee and thigh from a high-explosive shell which exploded close to his head, sending numerous fragments of shrapnel into his head and leg and rendering him unconscious. Rouse did not regain consciousness until his hospital train passed through the town of Bedford en route to a military hospital. As a result of his injuries, Rouse remained hospitalised for almost a year; undergoing several operations upon both his left temporal region—some of which were performed to remove embedded shrapnel—and his leg. Rouse's leg injuries left him unable to bend his knee and caused him to develop œdema, severely affecting his ability to walk. (Note: An Invaliding Medical Board hearing on 9 December 1915 found that Rouse's capacity to walk had been reduced by 75 percent. For the remainder of his life, Rouse would be forced to ascend and descend staircases by walking backwards.) Rouse was sent to recuperate at military hospitals in Leeds and, later, Clacton-on-Sea. He was formally discharged from the Army on 11 February 1916, and awarded a military pension of twenty shillings per week.

=== Recuperation ===
Following his recuperation, Rouse returned to live with his wife in Stoke Newington. Contemporary medical records reveal that, at this stage in his life, he was still severely disabled. In July 1916, Rouse's doctor noted that his memory was defective and that he was unable to wear a hat of any kind because the scar around his temporal lobe was irritable. Furthermore, although Rouse's speech and writing abilities were unaffected from this injury, one note in Rouse's medical records reads: "He sleeps well unless excited in any way". Consequently, Rouse's military pension was raised to twenty-five shillings per week in August 1916.

In late January 1917, Rouse's doctor discovered he had made a degree of progress in his recuperation from his leg injury and believed this injury could, by Rouse's own endeavour, be overcome. A year later, Rouse informed his doctor he was suffering from bouts of dizziness, although the doctor noted how talkative he was; even "[laughing] immoderately at times". In September 1918, Rouse again complained that he was suffering from a defective memory. Moreover, he complained on this occasion to be suffering from insomnia.

== Return to work ==
On 30 July 1919, a doctor examining Rouse observed that, while he would not allow his knee to be flexed by more than 30 percent, he now suffered no long-term disability from the head wound he had suffered in battle. This doctor could find no physical reason for Rouse's limitation of his knee movement. As such, this was ascribed to neurosis and his pension, which since September 1918 had been twenty-seven shillings and sixpence per week, was decreased to twelve shillings per week with effect from 17 September 1919. In August 1920, a final examination revealed his head injury had completely healed and the limitations of his knee movement had decreased dramatically. Rouse's pension was terminated the following month, with his receiving a final lump payment of £41. 5s. 0d. in settlement of all his injury claims.

In an effort to regain his health and mobility, Rouse became an active member of a local tennis club. Beginning in 1920, he also undertook a number of jobs which required a degree of physical exertion. Many of these jobs involved the use of vehicles, resulting in Rouse's becoming a moderately skilled mechanic. The same year, he also began to conduct illicit affairs in which he—invariably posing as a single man—seduced any woman or girl he found attractive. The first known person he seduced was a 14-year-old Edinburgh girl whom he impregnated at age 15, then abandoned, leaving the girl to give birth to their child in a home for unwed mothers. Four years later, in 1925, Rouse began an affair with a Hendon-based domestic servant named Nellie Tucker. In 1928, Tucker gave birth to a baby girl; shortly thereafter, Tucker obtained a child support order (the first of many by various women) against Rouse.

In June 1929, Rouse found employment as a commercial traveller for a Leicester-based firm which primarily sold braces and garters, typically at locations around the South Coast and the Midlands. This employment earned Rouse £4 a week, with expenses paid each Friday, and a sales commission paid every month. Through this employment, Rouse managed to earn sufficient money for him and his wife to obtain a mortgage on a house on Buxted Road in the London borough of Friern Barnet. Furthermore, in the summer of 1930, he also purchased a 1928 Morris Minor.

=== Promiscuity ===
Because of both Rouse's high sex drive and his general promiscuity, plus the fact his job required him to travel extensively across the entire country, throughout 1929 and 1930 he is known to have conducted a number of affairs with women—both married and single—whom he typically encountered through his employment. As with the Edinburgh 14-year-old and Tucker, many of these women came from poor backgrounds and would be deceived by Rouse's charismatic personality, his fabrications of being a wealthy London entrepreneur, and his promises of marriage. Furthermore, despite already being married and the father of a child, he is also known to have bigamously married at least three of these women. As a result of these affairs, Rouse fathered a number of illegitimate children.

By the summer of 1930, Rouse had already had one child support order imposed on him by Tucker, with whom he had been conducting an affair for several years; Tucker was now heavily pregnant with their second child and fully expecting him to marry her. A young Welsh woman named Ivy Jenkins had also been impregnated and was also fully expecting marriage in the near future. In addition, Rouse faced several other impending child support order cases from women across the country and one woman in Paris. (Note: Following Rouse's arrest, he would offer a statement to Northamptonshire Police in which he stated: "I am very friendly with several women, but it is an expensive game." Rouse then referred to the numerous women he had seduced across the country through his work as a commercial traveller as "my harem which takes me to several places". This comment was widely reported in the newspapers and caused great indignation with the British public.)

== Financial strain ==
At just what point Rouse decided on his scheme is not settled, nor how he arrived at it, as following his arrest, he gave several contradictory accounts as to just how and when he devised his plan. However, Rouse did mention that initially, he had begun to think about committing a murder in which he could fake his own death after he had read reports of the murder of a young Scottish barmaid named Agnes Kesson, who had been found murdered in a rural lane in the market town of Epsom in June 1930, and whose murder would ultimately remain unsolved. Rouse would also claim that his decision to fake his own death was caused by Tucker's announcement in the summer of 1930 that she was expecting her second child by him (an illegitimate daughter would be born on 29 October).

According to Rouse, he had simply "wanted to start afresh", yet to ensure the financial stability of his legal wife and his six-year-old son, he had drawn a life insurance policy for £1,000 in his name months before he executed his plan, to be paid in the event of the accidental death of the owner-driver of his vehicle. This life insurance policy named his legal wife as the beneficiary, and on either 2 or 3 November, he had sought out a man of roughly the same build as himself with whom he had become casually acquainted at a pub named the Swan and Pyramid whom Rouse claimed had previously told him "the usual hard-luck story", and had informed him: "Guv'nor, I've got nobody in the world that cares whether I live or die." In response, Rouse informed the man that, through his employment as a commercial traveller, he would be able to secure a job for him in the Midlands, and that he would be travelling to this location on 5 November.

In his later confession, Rouse specifically stated he had opted to time the fire in his car to be on Guy Fawkes Night, as "a fire would not be noticed so much" on this date due to the typical celebration rituals, and that his victim had readily agreed to accompany him to Leicester on 5 November, upon the promise of his possibly finding work in this city. To minimise any resistance from his victim, Rouse also bought the man a bottle of whisky to consume as he drove north.

== Murder ==
At approximately 1:50 in the morning of 6 November 1930, two young men returning from a Guy Fawkes Night dance in the town of Northampton to their homes in the nearby village of Hardingstone saw a fire in the distance. As Guy Fawkes Night had just passed, the men assumed the pyre they could see in the distance was a bonfire. As they walked down Hardingstone Lane toward the fire in the direction of their homes, a neatly dressed man carrying an attaché case passed in the opposite direction. When one of the young men remarked as to the blaze he could see in the distance, Rouse nodded and exclaimed: "It looks like somebody's having a bonfire up there." He then walked past the two men before turning in the direction of the main Northampton-London road.

The two men approached the fire, only to discover the source of the flames was actually a Morris Minor ablaze in a verge at the side of the country lane, with the flames reaching up to twelve feet in height. Upon summoning the Hardingstone village constable, Harry Bertie Copping, and the parish constable to the scene, the four men extinguished the fire with water from a nearby pond, only to discover a charred corpse lying across the front seats, with the head on the driver's seat, and the right arm burnt off at the elbow. Constable Copping would later recollect he had initially believed the skull of the victim was actually a scorched rugby ball. Crucially, a wooden mallet was found near the car, with three human hairs attached to the head. Although the fire had all but destroyed the vehicle, the number plate at the rear of the car was largely undamaged in the fire; thus, police were quickly able to determine it belonged to one Alfred Arthur Rouse of Friern Barnet.

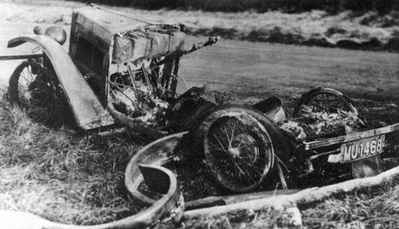
Rouse's Morris Minor, photographed on the morning of 6 November.

When the two young men informed investigators of their encounter with the man at the end of Hardingstone Lane, police issued an appeal in both the local and national press, urging the man to come forward and assist them with their inquiries. The case was covered in detail in many national newspapers on 7 November.

== Forensic examination and enquiries ==
A forensic examination of the vehicle revealed a joint on the feeding pipe between the petrol tank and the carburettor of the vehicle had been loosened before the fire had ignited, thus allowing petrol to freely stream both into and beneath the car, indicating the blaze had been deliberate. Moreover, spectroscopic tests conducted upon the victim's blood, and a microscopic examination of his air passages, revealed the victim had been alive, albeit unconscious, when the fire had started. Furthermore, he was estimated to have died within 30 seconds of the onset of the fire. The victim himself was estimated to have been between 33 and 37 years old, and due to the condition of his lungs, had likely worked in an extremely dusty atmosphere throughout his life.

Police visited Rouse's Friern Barnet home to interview his wife. Mrs Rouse was able to confirm her husband had left home at approximately 8:30 p.m. on 5 November to attend a business meeting in Leicester, and that he had arrived home at a time she (incorrectly) believed to be approximately 2 a.m. the following morning, saying nothing. She was then asked to accompany police to Northampton to assist in the identification of the victim. Due to the actual condition of the remains, she was not allowed to see the body, but instead asked to confirm whether she could identify scraps of clothing and a wallet containing 30 shillings which had been found upon the victim. Mrs Rouse stated the items of clothing looked like those her husband had worn, but she could not be certain; the wallet had definitely belonged to her husband.

== Arrest ==
Rouse himself had hitched a ride to London, arriving at his Friern Barnet home at approximately 6:20 a.m. He remained at his home for just 30 minutes before travelling by train to Glamorganshire to meet with Ivy Jenkins (whom he had earlier promised to marry). When Jenkins asked Rouse where his car was, he replied that it had been stolen in Northamptonshire the previous day, and that this was why it had taken him 18 hours to reach her. He assured Jenkins that he had reported the theft to both the police and his insurance company. Early the following morning, Phyllis, Ivy's sister, suspicious of Rouse, showed him a newspaper displaying an image of his burned-out car which speculated as to whether the deceased occupant had been the owner of the vehicle and questioning whether he had been murdered. In response, Rouse denied that the car was his, before announcing his intentions to travel by coach to Hammersmith Broadway. At 10 a.m. he boarded a coach at Cardiff destined for Hammersmith Broadway. When Rouse's coach had departed, Jenkins informed local police that Rouse had been at her house and of his intended destination; they in turn informed the Metropolitan Police Service of his whereabouts. Consequently, that evening, Rouse was arrested at Hammersmith coach terminal by a Detective-Sergeant Skelly of the Metropolitan Police, who had been waiting for him at the coach terminal.

At the Hammersmith police station, Rouse was informed that officers from Northamptonshire Police were already travelling to Hammersmith to interview him. In response, Rouse offered a rambling statement in which he claimed his victim was a hitchhiker he had encountered near St Albans, and who had accidentally set his vehicle alight while he (Rouse) had left his vehicle to relieve himself. Rouse further claimed he was travelling to Scotland Yard to confess to his crime at the time of his arrest, adding: "I am glad it's all over. I was going to Scotland Yard about it. I was responsible. I am very glad it's over. I have had no sleep." Upon the arrival of Northamptonshire police officers, Rouse was cautioned and driven to Northampton police station.

=== Initial confession ===
At Northampton police station, Rouse contradicted his earlier statement by claiming that he had encountered the victim hitchhiking along the Great North Road towards the Midlands and had offered the man a lift. He had driven to Hardingstone Lane accidentally, because he had lost his direction. At this location, he had stopped the vehicle to urinate and had asked his travelling companion, whom he had given a cigar, to fill the car's petrol tank from a can in the boot. According to Rouse, when he looked back, the vehicle was ablaze, with the man trapped inside. He had, he claimed, attempted to open the door of the vehicle, but had been beaten back by the flames. In a state of panic as to his predicament, he had fled from the scene.

Upon being confronted with the forensic evidence that the feeding pipe between the petrol tank and the carburettor of the vehicle had been loosened, Rouse remained adamant the fire had been accidental, offering conjecture it may have been started by the inebriated victim lighting the cigar he had been given after he had filled the petrol tank of his vehicle and accidentally spilled some of the contents of the petrol tank inside his vehicle. Furthermore, when questioned as to why he had been seen by the two young men walking from the scene of the fire with a briefcase in his hand, Rouse claimed he had taken the briefcase out of the car because he had earlier noticed the man had placed his hand upon it. (Note: This would prove to be the first of several differing instances in which Rouse discussed both whom his victim was and how he had encountered him. Although he would later claim that his victim was a "down on his luck" individual he had met in a London pub, he would initially claim to police that the man was a "respectable" individual he had encountered on the Great North Road, hitchhiking to the Midlands.)

On 27 November, Rouse appeared at Northampton assizes to be formally charged with the murder of an unknown man. He was remanded into custody until 3 December. On this date, a formal trial date of 26 January was set.

== Trial ==
The trial of Alfred Rouse began at the Northampton winter assizes on 26 January 1931. He was tried before Mr. Justice Talbot. The chief prosecuting counsel for the Crown was William Norman Birkett KC; he was assisted by Richard Elwes. The chief defence counsel was Donald Finnemore, who was assisted by A. P. Marshall. On this date, Rouse formally pleaded not guilty to the charge of the murder of an unknown man. (Note: The defence fees at Rouse's trial were paid for by his wife, who also found employment in Northampton to be close to him throughout his trial.)

=== Witness testimony ===
Throughout his trial, Rouse stuck to his claim the death of the unknown man had been accidental. To support this contention, Donald Finnemore introduced an engineer who testified that in many instances, excessive heat in a burning car would invariably result in the loosening of the joint on the feeding pipe, and as such, Rouse's contention the victim had inadvertently set the vehicle ablaze could be true. This claim was refuted by both Sir Bernard Spilsbury and Dr. Eric Shaw, who had together performed an autopsy upon the unidentified victim and who were each called to testify on behalf of the prosecution. Both men testified that the victim had been alive and unconscious when the fire had been started, and that the mallet found near the Morris Minor had likely been the weapon used to club the victim about the head prior to the inception of the fire. Spilsbury further testified that one of the few fragments of clothing found upon the victim not to have been destroyed in the fire was a section of the fork of the victim's trousers, which was found to be soaked in petrol, thus corroborating the prosecution's contention that Rouse had extensively doused both his victim and his vehicle in petrol before setting his vehicle ablaze. This forensic claim would be challenged by the defence, who alleged the petrol stain supported Rouse's claims the victim may have spilled the petrol over himself while lunging in a drunken stupor.

Another witness to refute the accidental death theory was a vehicular expert who had studied the remains of the Morris Minor, and who testified that a joint on the feeding pipe between the petrol tank and the carburettor of the vehicle had been forcibly loosened to allow petrol to flow into and beneath the motor, thus discrediting earlier defence claims that excessive heat in a burning car would invariably result in the loosening of this particular joint. (At one stage as Rouse stood in the witness box to reiterate his claims the fire had been accidental, prosecuting attorney William Norman Birkett placed the actual carburettor of Rouse's vehicle in his hands, causing Rouse to become visibly nervous as he attempted to explain earlier witness testimony as to the forcible loosening of the feeding pipe between the petrol tank and carburettor of his vehicle.)

The prosecution contention at Rouse's trial was that the actual motive behind Rouse's committing this murder had been to fabricate his own death in order that he could escape the financial constraints brought about by his numerous affairs, and to simply start his life afresh. To emphasise this, William Birkett called three of his mistresses to testify, explaining to the jury the testimony of these women would illustrate that "Rouse's domestic life was not what it should have been". Also to testify was a Government fire and insurance inspector named Colonel Cuthbert Buckle, who demonstrated to the jury how, in his view, the fire had been deliberately started by what he termed "human agency", with a deliberate loosening of the locknut of the petrol feeding pipe.

Rouse himself testified in his own defence at his trial. Despite the brief episode of nervousness he had displayed when handling the carburettor as he answered the prosecution's questions as to the loosening of his vehicle's feeding pipe, he often displayed an air of confidence as he reiterated his claims the death of the unknown victim had been accidental. He would often perform poorly in the witness box; repeatedly being forced to either admit to the contradictions in the earlier statements he had provided to police and his current claims, or that he had lied about his actions or movements. He could not, for instance, explain why he had falsely claimed to his mistress in Glamorganshire that his car had been stolen in Northamptonshire and that he had reported the theft to police, or why this mistress had earlier testified that when he had arrived at her house on 6 November he had smelled of petrol, and his eyebrows had appeared slightly scorched.

== Conviction ==
The trial lasted just six days. In a final address to the jury Mr. Justice Talbot stated thus: "Of course, there can be no doubt about it that these facts create grave suspicion against this man who was the owner of the car, and who drove it to the place where it was burned. If he is an innocent man he has created a grave suspicion against himself by his own folly."

The jury debated for just 25 minutes before reaching their verdict: Rouse was unanimously found guilty of murder and sentenced to death on 31 January. Having calmly heard the verdict, just prior to the sentence of death being imposed, Rouse firmly declared to Mr. Justice Talbot, "I am innocent, sir." Rouse did lodge an appeal against his conviction, primarily contending immoral character evidence had been submitted at his trial, and that this had influenced the jury. His appeal was heard on 23 February 1931, although it would prove unsuccessful.

=== Execution ===
On Tuesday, 10 March 1931, Rouse was hanged in Bedford Gaol. In the days prior to his execution, his legal wife and two of his mistresses alternately visited him to bid him a final farewell.

Rouse never formally admitted his guilt to the murder of his victim to the police, although shortly before his execution, he did write a letter to the Daily Sketch in which he confessed his guilt. In this written confession, Rouse stated that initially, he had resisted the thoughts he had initially developed that summer to commit a murder in which he could fabricate his own death, although a chance encounter with the unknown victim outside a London pub in the autumn of 1930 had led him to rethink his plans.

"Nellie Tucker was expecting another child [and] I was expecting to hear from [Ivy] Jenkins similar news. There were other difficulties and I was fed up. I wanted to start life afresh. In the autumn of last year something happened which made me think again. A man spoke to me near the Swan and Pyramid public house. He was a down-and-out, and he told the usual hard-luck story. I took him into the public house and he had some beer. I had lemonade. Of course, I paid for the drinks. He told me he usually hung about there. He did not tell me his name, but he did say that he had no relations, and was looking for work ... and that he was in the habit of getting lifts on lorries. He was the sort of man nobody would miss, and I thought he would suit the plan I had in mind ... I suddenly realised I should do it on 5 November, when a fire would not be noticed so much. I think it was 2 or 3 November when I searched out the man. He was having a drink of beer and we talked. When I said that I intended to go to Leicester on the Wednesday, he said he would be glad of a lift up there ... I made an appointment with him for the Wednesday night for eight o'clock. I met him outside the Swan and Pyramid. We talked a lot [on the journey to Leicester], but he did not tell me who he actually was. I did not care ... The man was half-dozing – the effect of the whisky. I gripped him by the throat with my right hand. I pressed his head against the back of the seat. He slid down, his hat falling off. I saw he had a bald patch on the crown of his head. He just gurgled. I pressed his throat hard ... he did not resist."
Section of Alfred Rouse's written confession to the Daily Sketch, penned shortly before his execution

In this written confession, Rouse stated that as he had driven his intended victim to the Midlands, he had encouraged him to drink from the bottle of whisky he had purchased in order to inebriate him before turning onto Hardingstone Lane. At this location, he had strangled the victim to the point of unconsciousness before loosening the feeding pipe between the petrol tank and the carburettor of his vehicle; he had then taken the petrol can from the boot and poured petrol on both the victim and about his car before placing the petrol tank in the rear of his car and, standing from a distance, setting the vehicle ablaze with a match.

Initially, Rouse had intended to walk to Northampton and travel to Scotland via train to begin life afresh; however, when he had seen the two young men returning from a Guy Fawkes Night dance at the end of Hardingstone Lane, he realised people would know he was not the victim in the car; therefore, after briefly returning to his London home with a hastily concocted story of his car having been stolen, he had opted to travel to Glamorganshire to meet with one of his mistresses. When he read extensive accounts of the murder in the Welsh press in which he was named as the prime suspect, he had travelled to Hammersmith Broadway, where he was arrested.

In this confession, published after his execution, Rouse again stated he had never asked his victim's name, claiming "there was no reason why I should do so".

== Aftermath ==
The body of Rouse's victim was interred in a grave marked with a simple cross bearing the inscription "In Memory of an Unknown Man. Died Nov. 6, 1930" in the grounds of St. Edmund's Church in Hardingstone, Northamptonshire. A metal box containing several newspaper accounts of Rouse's trial was buried with the victim. Village constable Harry Bertie Copping was among the pallbearers at the service. A new cross was erected above the grave in August 2022.

Prior to his execution, Rouse refused to assist police in establishing the identity of his victim, simply stating his belief he should not assist officers in this task "as they have not helped me". He did, however, offer a general description of his victim's identity. Rouse claimed the man he killed had been: "Forty years of age, between 5 ft 6 in [and] 5 ft 8 in. tall, respectably dressed in a light-coloured overcoat, with the [general] appearance of a clerk." The man also had "a slight brogue", and had a boxing or sporting tattoo on his right forearm. Furthermore, he had been wearing police boots which Rouse claimed the man had informed him had been given to him by London police. The man also carried a sports diary.

In May 2012, the family of a 23-year-old man named William Briggs—missing since 1930—contacted Northamptonshire Police in the hope advances in DNA profiling may provide a positive identification; the family were redirected to a team of forensic scientists from the University of Leicester and Northumbria University who obtained archived tissue samples of the murdered man for comparison; the mitochondrial DNA samples did not prove to be a match.

To date, DNA testing has revealed nine families whose relatives disappeared around 1930 are not related to the victim of the "Blazing Car Murder." Nonetheless, inquiries to establish the victim's identity are ongoing.

== Media ==
=== Television ===
- Thames Television commissioned and broadcast an episode focusing upon the "Blazing Car Murder" as part of a series focusing upon infamous British murder cases. Written by Clive Exton and directed by Jonathan Alwyn, the episode, titled Killers: The Blazing Car Murder, was broadcast on 18 August 1976.

=== Books (factual) ===
- Cannell, John (1931). New Light on the Rouse Case. J. Long Publishing Ltd. ASIN B00089FML0.
- Hodge, James (1995). Famous Trials: Captain William Kidd, Dr. Thomas Smethurst, Alfred Arthur Rouse, Patrick Carraher, John Thomas Straffen. Penguin Books Ltd. ISBN 978-0-140-02041-0.
- Lane, Brian (1988). The Murder Club Guide to the Midlands. Harrap. ISBN 978-0-245-54681-5.
- Lane, Brian (1991). The Butchers. Virgin Publishing Ltd. ISBN 978-1-852-27297-5.
- Normanton, Helena (1995) [1931]. Trial of Alfred Arthur Rouse. William Hodge & Co Ltd. ISBN 978-1-561-69177-7.
- Rose, Andrew (2009). Lethal Witness: Sir Bernard Spilsbury, the Honorary Pathologist. Kent State University Press. ISBN 978-0-750-94423-6.
- Wilson, Colin (1992). Murder in the 1930s. Carroll & Graf Publishers Inc. ISBN 978-0-881-84855-7.

=== Books (fictional) ===
- The fictional novel Voice of the Fire, written by Alan Moore and published in 1996, contains a section devoted to the "Blazing Car Murder". The section in question is devoted to Rouse's trial, in which he unsuccessfully attempts to persuade the jury of his innocence of murder in the dock.
- Dorothy Sayers used the Rouse case to construct her short story "In the Teeth of the Evidence", published in her collection of that name in 1939. The case is mentioned by name.

=== Radio ===
- The case of the "Blazing Car Murder" was dramatised in an episode of Orson Welles' radio drama series The Black Museum. The episode was entitled "The Mallet", and was first broadcast in February 1952.

== See also ==
- Capital punishment in the United Kingdom
- List of executioners

== Cited works and further reading ==
- Browne, Douglas G. (1980) [1952]. Bernard Spilsbury: His Life and Cases. Companion Book Club. ISBN 978-0-245-53586-4.
- Castleden, Rodney (2013). Infamous Murderers: Maniacs Filled With Hatred and Rage. Canary Press. ISBN 978-1-907-79586-2.
- Gaute, J. H. H.; Odell, Robin (1991). The New Murderers' Who's Who. Intl Polygonics Ltd. ISBN 978-1-558820-93-7.
- Hall, Angus (1991) [1976]. Crimes of Horror: Sensational Accounts of 25 Monstrous Cases. Treasure Press. ISBN 978-1-850-51170-0.
- Harrison, Paul (1994). Real-Life Crimes. London, England: Eaglemoss Publications Ltd. ISBN 978-1-856-29998-5.
- Jacobs, Thomas Curtis Hicks (1956). Aspects of Murder. St. Paul. ASIN B000PCTPAY.
- Moss, Alan (2015). Scotland Yard's History of Crime in 100 Objects. The History Press. ISBN 978-0-750-96655-9.
- Normanton, Helena (1995) [1931]. Trial of Alfred Arthur Rouse. Notable British Trials. William Hodge & Co Ltd. ISBN 978-1-561-69177-7.
- Rose, Andrew (2009). Lethal Witness: Sir Bernard Spilsbury, the Honorary Pathologist. Kent State University Press. ISBN 978-0-750-94423-6.
- Shapiro, Gavriel (2003). Nabokov at Cornell. Cornell University Press. ISBN 978-0-801-43909-4.
- Waddell, Bill (1990). Murder Casebook, Investigations into the Ultimate Crime. London, England: Marshall Cavendish. ISBN 978-0-7485-3874-4.
- Tremayne, Sydney (1995) [1931]. The Trial of Alfred Arthur Rouse: The Blazing Car Murder. Geoffrey Bles Limited. ISBN 978-1-561-69177-7.
