= HM Prison Bedford =

Prison in Bedford, England

Coordinates: 52.1395°N 0.4701°W

HMP Bedford
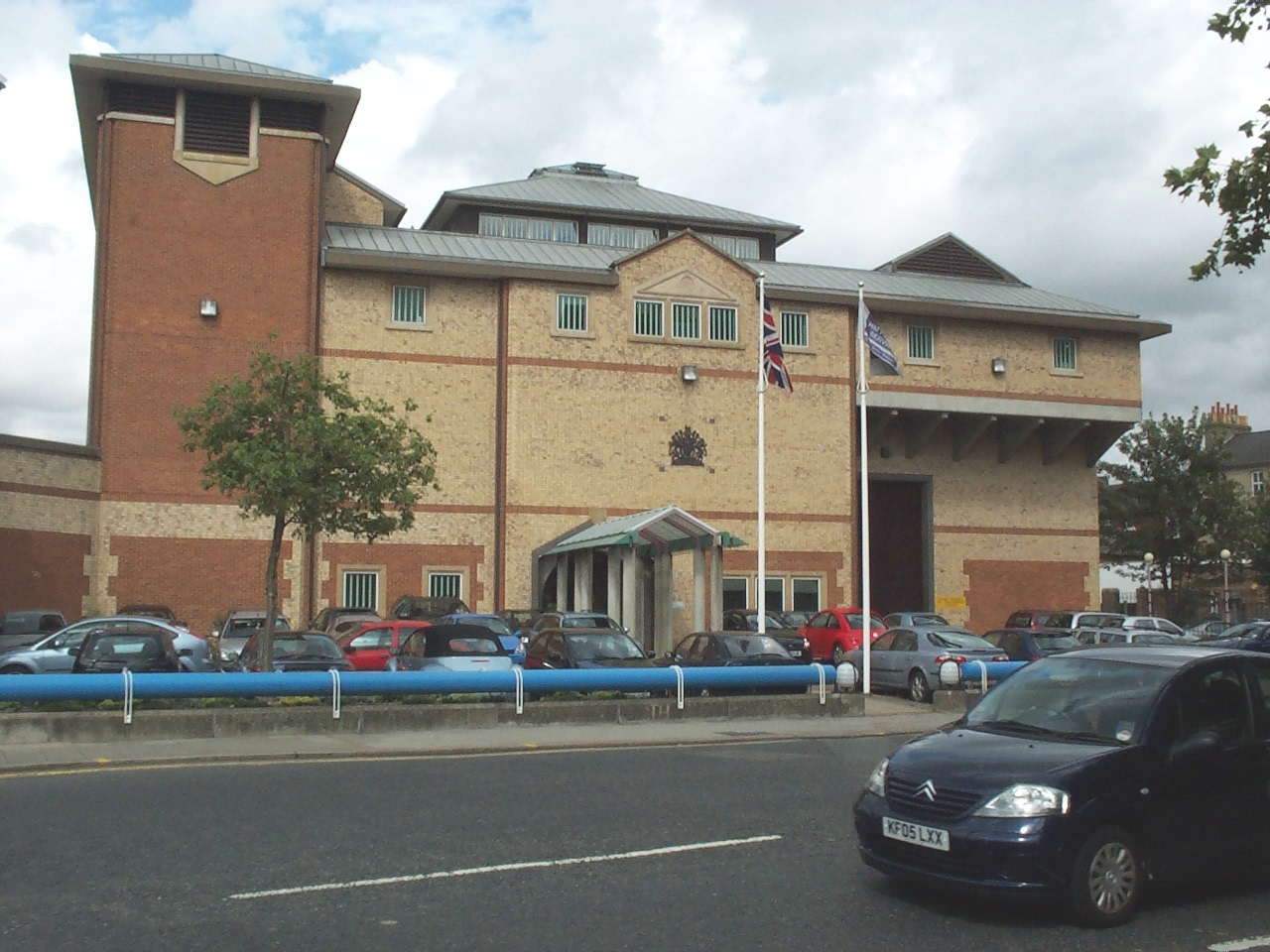
- Bedford Prison (new block)
- Interactive map of HMP Bedford
- Location: Bedford, Bedfordshire
- Security class: Adult Male/Category B
- Capacity: 500
- Population: 900+ (January 2019)
- Opened: 1801
- Managed by: HM Prison Services
- Governor: Sarah Bott
- Website: Bedford at justice.gov.uk

HMP Bedford is a Category B men's prison, located in the Harpur area of Bedford, Bedfordshire, England. The prison is operated by His Majesty's Prison Service.

== Building ==
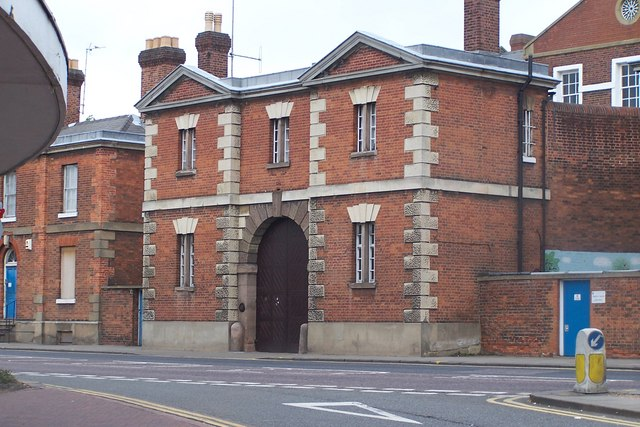
Old gatehouse

The prison has been on its current site since 1801 and was designed by the architect John Wing (1756–1826), who also designed the Bedford town bridge, the Infirmary and the House of Industry. The previous site was on the corner of the High Street and Silver Street, then known as Gaol Lane. The location is marked with a plaque in the pavement due to its connection with John Bunyan, being the probable place where he wrote The Pilgrim's Progress. Wing's original building included "...a turnkey's lodge, cells for debtors, felons and house of correction prisoners, hot and cold baths and an oven to purify infected clothing. The silence system was enforced with great severity, wooden partitions being placed between any two prisoners at work on the treadmill. Separate exercise was allowed in the yards, and meals were taken in the cells." The prison has been twice expanded, in 1849 and 1990.

== Role and facilities ==
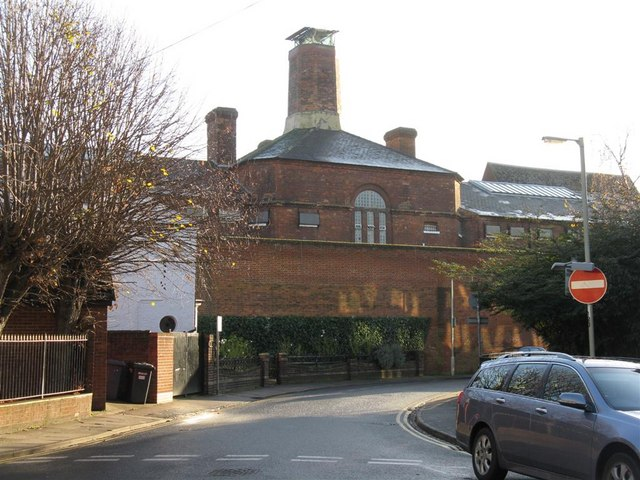
The west side of the prison viewed from Adelaide Square

Bedford is a local prison holding Category B male prisoners who have been remanded from Luton Crown Court and all magistrates' courts in Bedfordshire. The term 'local' means that the prison holds people on remand to the local courts, as well as sentenced prisoners.

There is a split regime operating within the prison, offering work and education on a part-time basis. There is a resettlement unit within the prison, a daily library provision, and gymnasium available. The prison hosts a healthcare centre with 12 beds and 24-hour health care coverage, while those prisoners who may be at risk from suicide or self-harm are provided a prisoner listener scheme.

Invisible Walls Community Interest Company runs the Visitors Centre, which features wheelchair access, a children's play area with supervised play activity and baby changing facilities. Two Quiet Gardens, affiliated to The Quiet Garden Trust, have been established inside the prison for quiet contemplation and prayer for both prisoners and staff.

== Conditions and events ==
In December 2009, the prison's own Independent Monitoring Board issued a report citing concerns over the high number of prisoners serving life sentences being held at Bedford. The report praised mental healthcare provision and highlighted staff morale, prisoners' property and the visits booking line of the prison. It also praised levels of respect between staff and inmates at the jail, along with the prison's food provision and hygiene standards.

In June 2010, Donna Stanton, aged 27, a female prison officer, was convicted after it emerged that she had a sexual relationship with an inmate. She had also smuggled a mobile phone, food, tobacco and newspapers into the prison for him. She was jailed for two years.

In September 2012, it was revealed that Bedford Prison had the highest suicide rate of any prison in England and Wales during 2011/12. Four inmates committed suicide at the prison during this period, out of a population of 465.

Michael Berry, 24, was the eighth prisoner to kill himself since 2017. Berry told staff he found it hard to ignore voices in his head telling him to kill himself but, despite this, no GP saw him and no anti psychotic medication was prescribed. The Prison and Probation Ombudsman said that, "significant issues remain" in mental health service provision at Bedford Prison.

Bedford Prison has been overcrowded; an inspection in 2016 revealed 495 prisoners while the certified capacity was just 322.

=== 2016 Riot ===
On Sunday 6 November 2016, there was a prisoner riot with 200 prisoners protesting against lockdowns due to staff shortages. Prisoners claim accessing drugs is easier than accessing clothing or bedding in the prison. Basics like soap and toilet paper were not consistently supplied. The Independent Monitoring Board at Bedford said that prisoners were not treated humanely before the riot. The numbers claiming they developed a drug problem while in the prison rose from 4% to 14%. The Prison Officers Association has been warning for some time about the risk of violence in British prisons. Her Majesty's Prison inspection in May 2016 found poor physical conditions and stated, “Arrangements for managing violent and bullying behaviour and supporting victims were weak.” The riot caused £1 million damage. The Howard League for Penal Reform stated officers refused to unlock prisoners when it was considered too risky. Andrew Neilson of the campaign said:

Of course that means prisoners are spending more and more time banged up in their cells. Personally I think that is partially why we've seen this incident happen, because if you are telling people they will spend 23 out of 24 hours of a day locked in basically a toilet, then you're breeding a lot of boredom and frustration.

It was one of four serious incidents within two months, with riots at Birmingham Prison, Lewes Prison and Swaleside Prison.

=== 2018 Special measures ===
In May 2018 inspectors found the prison was making insufficient progress and Bedford Prison was put into special measures. In September 2018 Peter Clarke activated the urgent notification protocol because inspectors had found high levels of violence and inexperienced staff having difficulty maintaining control. Clarke wrote, “The clear view of the inspectorate is that immediate and decisive intervention is needed at HMP Bedford to avert further decline and an even more dangerous lack of control than is currently the case. It is of great concern that for seven years the prison has been on a path of seemingly inexorable decline. Repeated inspection findings clearly show that this has been the case. For much of that time there was a marked inconsistency in the leadership of the prison, with frequent changes of governor.” Prisoners were effectively in control choosing when to comply with authority, and regularly breaking rules. There was a smell of drugs in all wings, 3 in 5 prisoners admitted developing a drug habit since getting into the prison, there was a rat and cockroach infestation. There were 116 assaults on staff during the 6 months to September 2018. Living conditions were bad and overcrowded and there was insufficient purposeful activity for prisoners.

== Notable former inmates ==
- John Bunyan – author of The Pilgrim's Progress, convicted for unlicensed preaching.
- Ahmed Ali Awan – convicted of the racially motivated murder of Ross Parker.
- Sarah Dazley – poisoner, hanged in 1843.
- Chris Denning – former BBC radio DJ convicted of multiple child sex offences.
- James Hanratty (25) – the last person to be executed in Bedford. Hanged on 4 April 1962 for the murder of Michael Gregsten (34) near Dunstable in August 1961.
- Nicholas Prosper – shot dead his mother, brother and sister and plotted to carry out a mass shooting at a school.
- Alfred Rouse (36) – hanged on 10 March 1931, for the Blazing car murder at Hardingstone which attracted sensational national interest. Rouse was tried at Northampton Assizes.
- Matthew Narroway – Stabbed and attacked two individuals outside a pub in Harpenden after not being allowed in a smoking area in 2024. Sentenced to three and a half years in prison.
