= The Quiet Garden Trust =

British charitable organization

- Formation: 1992
- Founded: September 1992
- Founder: Reverend Philip Roderick
- Registration no.: 1038528
- Location: The Quiet Garden Trust The Rectory, Dark Lane Ewyas Harold Herefordshire. HR2 0EZ
- Coordinates: 51.67649°N 0.60626°W
- Region served: Worldwide
- Key people: Charity Coordinator - Sarah Godson
- Website: quietgarden.org

The Quiet Garden Trust is a non-profit organisation which encourages the provision of gardens where people can set aside time for contemplation, prayer and renewal. The opening of Quiet Gardens is controlled by the respective owners, and the trust plays a co-ordinating and resourcing role. There are currently about three hundred such gardens in eighteen countries, and the idea has grown to encompass quiet spaces in churches, schools, hospitals and prisons. The gardens are open to people of all faiths, for stillness and reflection.

== History and founder ==
The Quiet Garden Movement started in 1992, founded by Reverend Philip Roderick, then the director of the Chiltern Christian Training Programme in the Diocese of Oxford. The first Quiet Garden was a domestic garden in Stoke Poges, Buckinghamshire, belonging to Geoffrey Cooper, who was The Daily Telegraph's aviation correspondent.

Roderick is an Anglican priest, a percussionist, an educator and a writer who worked as a trainer in theology and spirituality for both laity and clergy. Originally from South Wales, he was brought up a Methodist, and read Philosophy and English at Swansea University. Many threads are woven into his spiritual experience, including meditation, the monastic tradition and contact with other religions. He was ordained and became a university chaplain, and it was after visiting Christian communities in India and America during a sabbatical in 1992 that he realised the significance in the life of Jesus of withdrawing to a quiet place to spend time in solitude. It was this that led him to found the Quiet Garden Movement later that year.

The Quiet Garden Trust was registered as a charity by the Charity Commission for England and Wales on 21 June 1994.

== Garden locations ==
The Quiet Garden Movement has spread over the past twenty years to encompass about three hundred gardens in many parts of the world, not only in European countries such as the United Kingdom, Ireland, France, Belgium, Finland, Austria, Switzerland and Cyprus, but also in Australia, New Zealand, South Africa, Botswana, Kenya, Uganda, Brazil, Haiti, Canada and the USA.

The gardens vary widely in size, location and character. Most cater for a broad public, but some were created to serve a particular community, such as the Quiet Garden on the edge of the Nsambya Hospital in Kampala, Uganda for AIDS patients and carers. Polesworth Abbey in Warwickshire has created a sensory garden with fragrant herbal plants, designed in consultation with both sighted and partially sighted people, and a Quiet Prison Garden in HM Prison Bedford (now closed) benefited both prisoners and staff.

Others are simply private gardens which people have decided to share. For example, Michael and Janet Chapman frequently open their three-acre garden just outside London. "We are lucky enough to have this lovely garden. To hog it all to ourselves would be like keeping an Old Master tucked away in the basement," says Michael.

== Ecumenism and diversity ==
The Quiet Garden Movement transcends normal doctrinal barriers and denominational divisions. Although Roderick is an Anglican clergyman, the concept has been embraced by a diverse range of faiths.

A Quaker group in Beverley, Yorkshire, celebrated its fiftieth anniversary by creating a Quiet Garden next to their Friends meeting house. The first Orthodox Quiet Garden was set up in the grounds of the Orthodox Church in Sifton, Manitoba, Canada. Other fellowships that have established Quiet Gardens include Alcester Baptist Church, Immanuel Evangelical Lutheran Church in San Jose, California, and a Roman Catholic church in Stainforth, South Yorkshire, that reclaimed derelict land with the help of prisoners from a nearby prison. There is also a Quiet Garden at the English Benedictine Monastery of Worth Abbey in Crawley, West Sussex.

In the words of Philip Roderick, "Openness to God in unexpected places is what it is all about. God is all over the place, we only have to open our ears and our eyes."

== Patrons ==
The patrons of the trust are:

- Richard Foster, Christian theologian, speaker and author
- Kallistos Ware, Metropolitan Kallistos of Diokleia, Assistant Bishop, Greek Orthodox Archdiocese of Thyateira and Great Britain
- Margaret Magdalene Evening, writer and spiritual director
- The Most Revd Vincent Nichols, Archbishop of Westminster, head of the Roman Catholic Church in England and Wales
- The Rt Revd John Pritchard, Anglican Bishop of Oxford
- Professor Sir Ghillean Prance, British botanist and ecologist, former director of the Royal Botanic Gardens, Kew
- The Rt Revd Graham Usher, Anglican Bishop of Norwich and lead the Church of England's Environment Programme
- Shane Connolly, floral designer to Queen Elizabeth
