= Gervase Elwes =

English tenor (1866–1921)

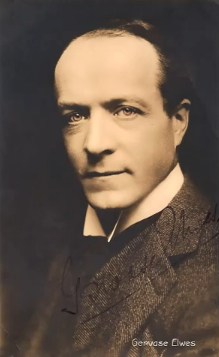
Gervase Elwes, circa 1918 (signed photo by Lena Connell).

Gervase Henry Cary-Elwes, DL (15 November 1866 – 12 January 1921), better known as Gervase Elwes, was an English tenor of great distinction, who exercised a powerful influence over the development of English music from the early 1900s up until his death in 1921 due to a railroad accident in Boston at the height of his career.

== Background to his career ==
Elwes was born in Billing Hall, Northampton, the son of Valentine Dudley Henry Cary-Elwes (1832-1909) and his second wife, Alice Geraldine, daughter of Rev. Henry Ward, of Killinchy, County Down, brother of the 3rd Viscount Bangor. A relative was the famous miser John Elwes. Of the Northamptonshire and Lincolnshire landed gentry, he was educated at The Oratory School (a Roman Catholic school) and Woburn School, Weybridge, where he arrived in 1885, and finally at Christ Church, Oxford, where he was active as a cricketer and violinist. At the age of 22 he married Lady Winifride Mary Elizabeth Feilding, a daughter of Rudolph Feilding, 8th Earl of Denbigh. After Oxford he trained as a lawyer and diplomat, spending some years in Brussels, where he began his first formal singing lessons at the age of 28. However, he had to overcome a social convention which resisted a member of the upper classes from becoming a professional singer, and it was not until the early 1900s, in his late thirties, that he gave his first professional performances in London. His principal teachers were Jacques Bouhy in Paris (1901–03), and in London Henry Russell and Victor Biegel, who remained his friend and teacher throughout his life. Bouhy asked him to decide between a baritone career in opera or a tenor career in oratorio and concert, and he chose the latter.

His first professional appearance in London was opposite Agnes Nicholls, in Wallfahrt nach Kevlaar by Engelbert Humperdinck at the St James's Hall, with the Handel Society under J. S. Liddle in late April 1903, and immediately afterwards he appeared at the Westmorland Festival. In June 1903 he was auditioned at the Royal College of Music in London by Charles Villiers Stanford, who left the room and brought Hubert Parry in to hear him as well. The violinist Professor Kruse, who was then attempting to revive the Saturday 'Pops' at the St James's Hall jumped out of his chair and promptly engaged him, and it was Kruse who arranged for his first appearance in Edward Elgar's The Dream of Gerontius early in 1904 as an addition to his Beethoven Festival. Harry Plunket Greene, who had encouraged Elwes through this audition, also remained his lifelong friend.

== The character of his voice ==
Elwes had a voice entirely in the English colouring, but with an unusual quality of sincerity and passion, and of considerable power. His diction and intonation were very secure, his delivery somewhat 'gentlemanly' but his phrasing long in conception and serving intense melodic inflexions. His singing possessed a spiritual fervour deriving from the religious disposition of his parents, who had taken the unusual step of converting to Roman Catholicism when he was five years old.

Victor Biegel, a "little round, bald Viennese", was for some time accompanist to the celebrated German lieder singer Raimund von zur-Mühlen and had a special understanding of the songs of Johannes Brahms, which he imparted to Elwes. There was a great rapport, and his teaching, especially during his six-month residence at Billing Hall (an Elwes estate) in 1903, completely freed and relaxed Elwes' voice, opening the way for the sustained power and brilliance of his upper register, and the vocal stamina which enabled him to maintain great oratorio roles (for which he was much in demand) with absolute conviction through a singing career of nearly two decades.

== Elwes and Lincolnshire music ==
During the early 1900s Elwes and his wife played an important part in encouraging and organizing the provincial Music Competition Festivals in Lincolnshire (Elwes often conducting or singing), centred upon their family home, the Manor at Brigg.

In 1905, at the suggestion of his friend Percy Grainger, an open competition class for folk singers was included. As a result, many wonderful songs were collected, notably from Joseph Taylor (who made some commercial records for the Gramophone Company). Taylor was the source of the melody used by Delius for his Brigg Fair.

== Gerontius and the St Matthew Passion ==
Elwes became the greatest living exponent (alongside John Coates) of Edward Elgar's The Dream of Gerontius, which he first performed on 9 April 1904, with Muriel Foster and David Ffrangcon-Davies at the Queen's Hall under the baton of Felix Weingartner. He was inspired by the music on hearing the concert performance in May 1903 just preceding the ceremonial opening of Westminster Cathedral. The religious authenticity of his interpretation was immediately recognised. He performed the work 118 times in all. He was also completely identified with the role of the Evangelist in Bach's St Matthew Passion. His appearances at the Three Choirs Festivals, and at those of Peterborough and Norwich, became annual fixtures. In 1908 at the Norwich Festival he was partnered (according to Henry Wood) in Gerontius by the Dutch contralto Julia Culp, and in the same festival performed Bach's Magnificat with Louise Kirkby Lunn and Herbert Witherspoon. In 1909 Elwes sang Gerontius and the St Matthew Passion Evangelist in New York under Walter Damrosch.

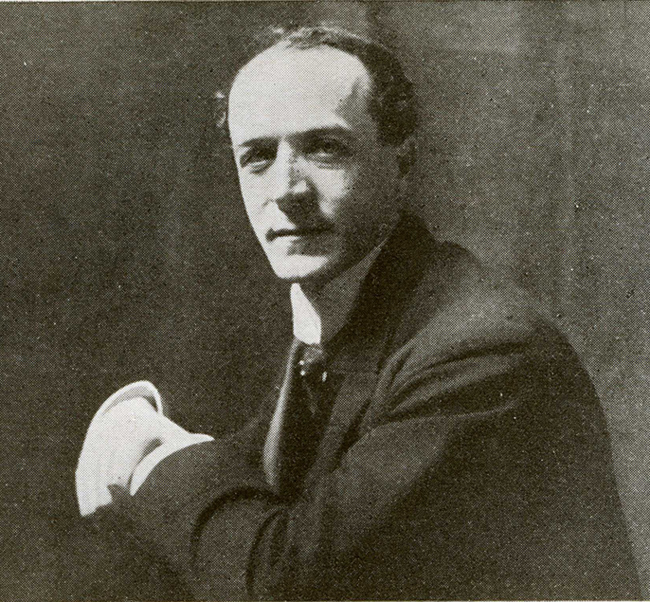
Elwes, circa 1920 (photo by Robin Legge).

Culp sang the Gerontius Angel role at the London Music Festival on 22 May 1911 with Elwes, Herbert Brown and the Norwich Festival Chorus, and Wood states that this was the occasion upon which Elwes finally established his reputation as the greatest exponent of the name part. Five days later Wood and Elwes closed the 1911 Festival with a performance of the St Matthew Passion with Agnes Nicholls, Edna Thornton, Herbert Brown, Herbert Heyner and Robert Radford. (It was also in 1911, at the Queen's Hall, that he gave the premiere of Franco Leoni's oratorio on the Passion, Golgotha, with Clara Butt, Kennerley Rumford and Maggie Teyte in the other solo roles.)

In May 1916 he gave six performances of Gerontius on consecutive days, with Clara Butt as the Angel, Charles Mott (Angel of the Agony) and Herbert Brown (Priest), the Leeds Choral Union and London Symphony Orchestra, conducted by Elgar himself, in aid of the Red Cross. His last performance of the work was in Northampton in October 1920, with Robert Radford and Norah Dawnay, shortly before leaving for his American tour.

== Lieder ==
Elwes became the foremost English-born performer of the Brahms lieder in the first decades of the 20th century. In January 1907, he made a singing tour of Germany which included Berlin, Munich, Leipzig, Frankfort, and Cologne, giving recitals with Fanny Davies (a celebrated pupil of Clara Schumann's). He sang mixed programmes, but his performance of German Lieder, and especially of Brahms, in German, was greatly admired. He was then singing such songs as Komm bald, Am Sonntag Morgen, Salamander, Ein Wanderer, Wir wandelten, Auf dem Kirchhof, Magyarisch, Die Kränze, Ständchen, and Botschaft. He sang the Brahms Liebeslieder in Brussels in 1908 with Marie Brema, and in London gave a recital with Paderewski. In January 1913 at the Queen's Hall, under Henry Wood, he sang Mahler's Das Lied von der Erde in company with the contralto Doris Woodall: Wood thought it 'excessively modern but very beautiful'. Brahms remained central to Elwes's repertoire to the end, and he also performed lieder of Grieg, Dvořák, and George Henschel. Early in his career he found an ideal accompanist in Frederick B. Kiddle, and they remained associated until his death.

In January 1912 in a recital for Henry Wood at Queen's Hall Elwes introduced the settings of poems of Paul Verlaine by Poldowski (Lady Dean Paul, born Régine Wieniawski, the daughter of Henryk Wieniawski). These songs then had a great vogue in Paris and this performance made a deep impression. During the First World War he sang in concert tours for British soldiers in France organized by Lena Ashwell.

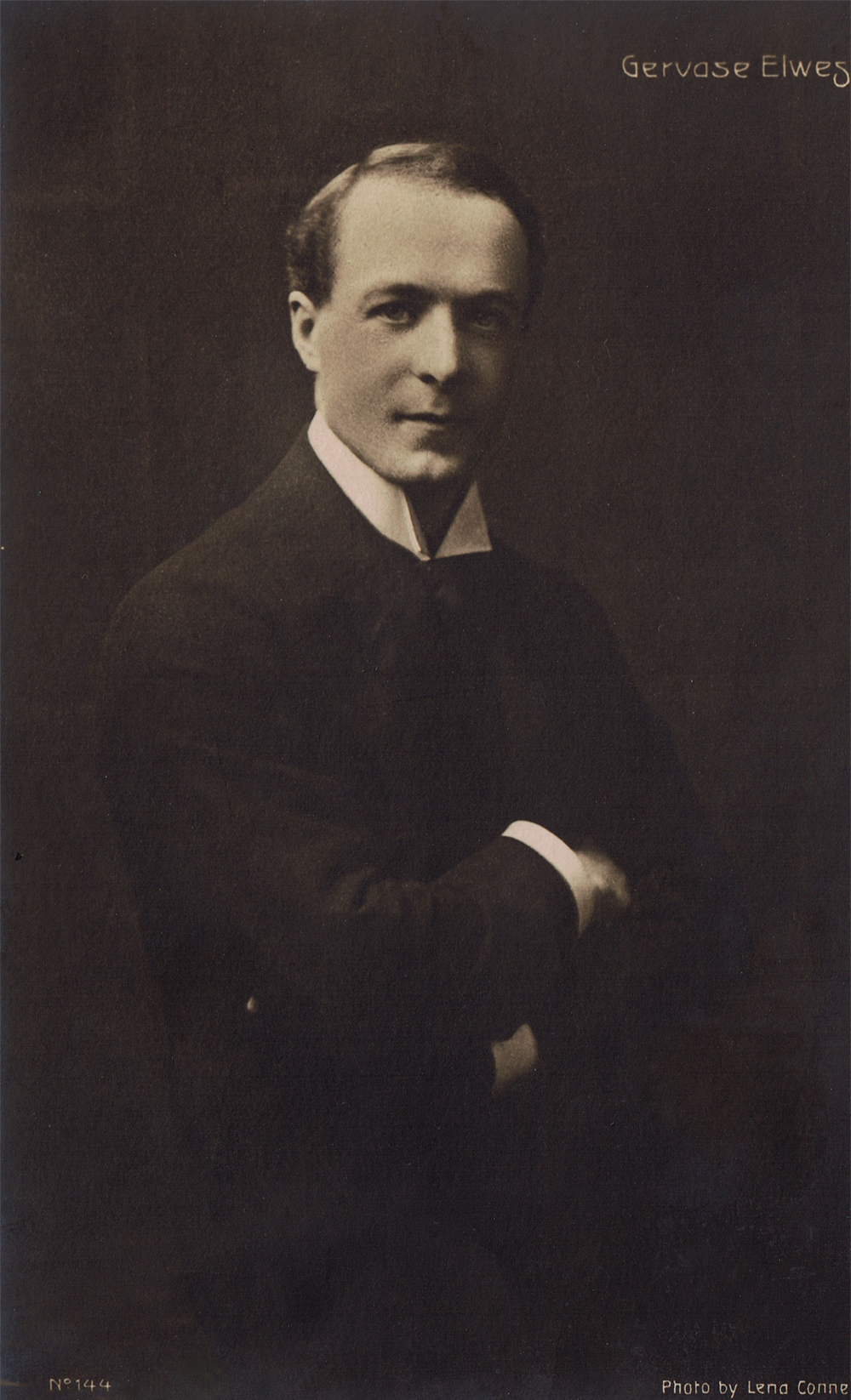
Elwes, circa 1918 (photo by Lena Conne).

== Elwes and English art-song ==
Elwes was an important influence on English art-song in his time. Contemporary composers Ralph Vaughan Williams and Roger Quilter wrote pieces for his voice. He premiered, and was first to record, Williams' song cycle, On Wenlock Edge, which the composer dedicated to him. Many of Quilter's songs, including the cycle, To Julia, were first performed by Elwes. In 1912 he premiered Thomas Dunhill's song cycle, The Wind Among the Reeds, for the Philharmonic Society.

He inspired a generation of British composers including Charles Villiers Stanford and Frank Bridge, as well as the leading British singers of his time, as documented in many private and published memorials.

== Family ==
He was the brother of Dudley Cary-Elwes, Roman Catholic Bishop of Northampton. Elwes was married in Kensington on 11 May 1889 to Lady Winefride Mary Elizabeth Feilding (died 24 February 1959), National President of the Catholic Women's League, daughter of the 8th Earl of Denbigh and Mary Berkeley. They lived at The Manor House, Brigg, Lincolnshire, and at Billing Hall, Northamptonshire, and had six sons and two daughters together:

- Robert Geoffrey Gervase John Elwes (1890–1956), First World War soldier
- Rudolph Philip Cary Elwes (1892–1962), Coldstream Guards Captain
- Francis Guy Robert Elwes (1896–1966), architect and interior designer
- Monsignor Aubrey Valentine Denis Elwes (1899–1966 Brigg, Lincolnshire), Roman Catholic cleric
- Sir Richard Everard Augustine Elwes (1901–1968), High Court judge and Recorder of Northampton
- Simon Edmund Vincent Paul Elwes (1902–1975), a portrait artist and Royal Academician; grandfather of the actor Cary Elwes.
- Margaret Mary Katharine Elwes (1903–), who married Lt. Col. John Eric William Graves Sandars (1906–1974) of Gate Burton Hall. They had one daughter, child actress Clare Sandars, who married Sir James McEwen, Bt.
- Clare Mary Alice Cynthia Catherine Celia Elwes (1905–1998), who married Sir John Henry Keswick, KCMG (1906–1982), and had one daughter Margaret, known as Maggie Keswick, gardening author (1941–1995), who founded Maggie's Centres for those suffering from cancer. She left two children by her husband, the landscape architect Charles Jencks.

== Death ==
On 12 January 1921, Elwes was killed in a horrific accident at Back Bay railway station in Boston, Massachusetts, in the midst of a high-profile recital tour of the United States at the height of his powers. Elwes and his wife had alighted on the platform when the singer attempted to return to the conductor an overcoat that had fallen off the train. He leaned over too far and was hit by the train, falling between the moving carriages and the platform. He died of his injuries a few hours later. He was 54 years old. A week after the event, Edward Elgar wrote to Percy Hull, 'my personal loss is greater than I can bear to think upon, but this is nothing – or I must call it so – compared to the general artistic loss – a gap impossible to fill – in the musical world.' He is buried in the cemetery of Our Lady of Perpetual Succour Church, Great Billing.

== Memorials ==
Among many memorial concerts nationwide, a memorial performance of The Dream of Gerontius was given at the Royal Albert Hall, at which John Coates and Frederick Ranalow sang with the Royal Choral Society. The Musicians' Benevolent Fund was first established as the Gervase Elwes Memorial Fund for Musicians, and his figure became a presiding genius of twentieth-century English music. His particular association with the lyrics of A. E. Housman and the music of Elgar, and his death soon after the First World War, reinforce his embodiment of the lost Edwardian generation, perhaps the last in which his religious conviction could so thoroughly have endeared him to so many. At much the same time the Glasgow Orpheus Choir instituted a Gervase Elwes Silver Medal, and the Feis Ceoil in Dublin inaugurated its Gervase Elwes Memorial Cup. A choir named after him was established at Walsall. A portrait plaque by Arthur Vokes was set up in the centre of the village of Billing.

A portrait bust of him by Malvina Hoffman was sent by Mrs Vincent Astor and was set in a specially prepared niche on the grand tier of the old Queen's Hall (the original venue of the Promenade Concerts) as a memorial by his American friends, being unveiled in 1922. Around the arch of the niche was a motto, 'With his whole heart he sang songs and loved Him that made him.' On that occasion two Bach chorales were conducted by Vaughan Williams.

Sir John Barbirolli (a successor of the original conductor of Gerontius, Hans Richter, as conductor of the Hallé Orchestra, who had played as an orchestral cellist in Gerontius under Elgar's baton with Elwes performing the Soul) remembered Elwes as 'that great and noble artist'. In addition to being a great singer, Elwes was a capital game shot and devoted much of his spare time to shooting on his estates.

== Recordings: Discography ==
Elwes recorded first in 1911–1913 for the Gramophone Company, and later for the Columbia Graphophone Company. This listing is thought to be complete for known recordings of this artist.

HMV

- 4-2156 Phyllis hath such charming graces (Lane Wilson arr.) recorded 29 July 1911 (matrix y13904e).
- 4-2161 Absent yet present (Maude Valérie White) recorded 29 July 1911 (matrix y13902e).
- 4-2189 Morning Hymn (Henschel) recorded 17 November 1911 (matrix ab14297e).
- 4-2195 To Daisies, and Song of the Blackbird (Quilter) recorded 17 November 1911 (matrix ab14296e).
- 4-2232 Sigh no more, ladies (Aiken) recorded 3 September 1912 (matrix y15619e).
- 7-42004 Ich liebe dich (Grieg) recorded 17 November 1911 (matrix ab14298e).
- 02379 So we'll go no more a-roving (M.V. White) recorded 17 October 1911 (matrix ac5577f) on YouTube.
- 02379X So we'll go no more a-roving (M.V. White) recorded 27 December 1912 (matrix z6936f).

Columbia

- 65826 Battle Hymn (arr Stanford)/F.B. Kiddle
- 65827 Sonnet XVIII (W.A. Aiken)/F.B. Kiddle
- 6847 Blow, blow thou winter wind (Quilter) 1916 on YouTube.
- 6848 Fill a glass with golden wine (Quilter)
- 6849 In Summertime on Breedon (Peel)
- 6850 Now sleeps the crimson petal, and Love's Philosophy (Quilter) 1916 on YouTube.
- 6851 The Roadside Fire (Vaughan Williams) 1920 on YouTube.
- 6852 Cuckoo Song (Quilter)
- 71017 Listen to the voice of love
- 71018 Brittany
- 71051 Gifts (Taylor)/F.B. Kiddle
- 71052 By Wenlock Town (Janet Hamilton)/F.B. Kiddle
- 74150 The Lake Isle of Innisfree (Ley)/F.B. Kiddle
- 74151 A Sea Dirge (Dunhill)/F.B. Kiddle
- 75329 O Mistress Mine! and Fair House of Joy (Quilter) on YouTube
- 75330 Songs my mother taught me (Dvorak)
- 75357 A carol of bells (C.V. Stanford)/F.B. Kiddle
- 75360 Where'er you walk (Handel)/F.B. Kiddle on YouTube
- 75419 On Wenlock Edge (Vaughan Williams)/London String Quartet on YouTube
- 75420 From far, from eve and Oh when I was in love with you (Vaughan Williams) /London String Quartet
- 75421 Is my team ploughing? (Vaughan Williams)/London String Quartet
- 75422 Bredon Hill (Vaughan Williams)/London String Quartet
- 75423 Clun (Vaughan Williams)/London String Quartet
- 76089 So sweet love seemed (Piggot) and Jenny kissed me (Brougham)/F.B. Kiddle
- 76091 A Pastoral (Colin Taylor)/F.B. Kiddle
- 76092 Love went a-riding (Bridge)/F.B. Kiddle
- 76093 Lift up your heads on high (Bach)/F.B. Kiddle on YouTube

== Ancestry ==
Ancestors of Gervase Elwes

Cary Elwes (1718–?)
Robert Cary Elwes (1772–1852)
Elizabeth Holgate (d. 1820)
Charles Cary Elwes (1800–1866)
Charles Anderson-Pelham, 1st Baron Yarborough (1749–1823)
Hon Caroline Pelham (d. 1812)
Sophia Aufrère (d. 1786)
Valentine Dudley Henry Cary-Elwes (1832–1909)
Rear-Admiral Peter Rye
Elinor Rye (d. 1859)
Gervase Henry Elwes
Bernard Ward, 1st Viscount Bangor (1719–1781)
Hon. Edward Ward (1753–1812)
Lady Ann Bligh (d. 1789), daughter of John Bligh, 1st Earl of Darnley and Lady Theodosia Hyde
Rev. Hon. Henry Ward (1795–1874)
William Crosbie, 1st Earl of Glandore (1716–1781)
Lady Arabella Crosbie (1757–1813)
Lady Theodosia Bligh (d. 1777), sister of Lady Ann Bligh (d. 1789)
Alice Geraldine Ward (1844–1907)
Ross Mahon (d. 1788)
Rev. Henry Mahon (1771–1838)
Lady Anne Browne (d. 1815), daughter of John Browne, 1st Earl of Altamont and Anne Gore (d. 1771)
Anne Mahon (d. 1875)
Abraham Symes (d. 1783)
Anne Symes (d. 1818)
Anne Le Hunte (d. 1817)
