= Mirabel Topham =

Topham [née Hillier], Mirabel Dorothy (1891–1980), racecourse owner

- Born: Mirabel Dorothy Hillier; 14 August 1891; London
- Died: 28 May 1980 (aged 88); Aintree
- Other name: Hope Hillier
- Known for: Aintree Racecourse Chairman; Actress
- Spouse: Arthur Ronald Topham

Mirabel Topham (15 August 1891 – 28 May 1980) was chairman and managing director of Topham Ltd for 36 years to 1973 and owner of Aintree Racecourse in Liverpool, England, where the Grand National horse steeplechase is held. She was one of the colourful and controversial personalities in UK racing during this time.

== Early life and stage career ==
Mirabel Dorothy Hillier was born in London on 14 August 1891 and spent her childhood at the Baron's Court Hotel in Fulham that was managed by her grandparents James and Rachel Hillier. Her parents Henry Hope and Nellie Hillier (née Buck) assisted, but by 1922 her father was manager of the Haymarket Theatre, London. She had one brother (Cedric, died 1991, aged 99), a sister Beatrice (1895–1988) and a second sister who died in infancy. The family moved to West Ham and then Walthamstow, by which time the sisters were working as actresses or gaiety girls under the names Hope and Trixie Hillier.

As Hope Hillier she appeared in plays, comedies and pantomimes in London's West End as well as touring productions. In 1907 she was in the farce Mrs Ponderbury's Post at the Vaudeville produced by Charles Hawtrey. While on tour appearing in The Cinema Star at the Royal Court Theatre, Liverpool, she met Arthur Topham whom she would later marry. Her last appearance was in a 1922 production of J. M. Barrie's Quality Street at the Haymarket.

Mirabel Hillier married Arthur Ronald Topham on 19 April 1922 at Our Lady and St Edward church, Chiswick. They had become engaged in 1916 when he was in the army (gunner, Royal Artillery). The couple had a difficult relationship. They did not have any children but later informally adopted a cousin's children, Patricia and James Bidwell-Topham, who later inherited most of her estate.

From 1937 Mirabel and Arthur Topham lived in Paddock Lodge on the Aintree Racecourse site. Ronald Topham was not suited to business life but Mirabel demonstrated business expertise and a real interest in the race course.

== Professional life with Topham Ltd ==
Topham's family had run the Aintree Racecourse near Liverpool since the 1840s. She joined the board of Topham Ltd, the family firm that ran Aintree Racecourse, becoming a director in 1935 and chairman and managing director in 1938 until 1973. Mirabel Topham was a forceful personality in the male-dominated world of racing. During the Second World War, although the racecourse was used by the military, the 1940 Grand National was run. Proposed construction that would have made horseracing difficult was not installed. After the war ended, Topham Ltd obtained permits, materials and workmen to repair damage to the stands and course so the Grand National could resume in 1946.

Under her Chairmanship the freehold of the Aintree Racecourse was purchased from Hugh Molyneux, Earl of Sefton in 1949 for £275,000. She was involved at the start of a campaign for bookmakers to pay for information from the course that became the Racecourse Amenities Fund to distribute money from all bookmakers to the racecourses. In 1960 she took the decision to end 'Jump Sunday', a traditional event when up to 100,000 sightseers could walk round and view the Grand National course prior to the races. This was after advice from the police following letters threatening to damage the jumps.

There were several new developments at Aintree during her Chairmanship. The Topham Steeplechase for the Topham Trophy was added to the Grand National in 1949. In addition, the 1 mile 4 furlongs Mildmay Steeplechase course was added in 1953 to increase the racing options. From the late 1950s attendance at horse racing declined. A new attraction of motorcar racing was introduced on a 3-mile Grand Prix circuit built within the racecourse at Aintree. The BBC concluded an agreement in 1959 for exclusive rights to televise both horse-racing and motorcar racing from Aintree for an initial 3 years. Between 1955 and 1962 Aintree hosted five British and one European Grand Prix, including in 1955 the first Formula One British Grand Prix won by Stirling Moss. However, 1962 saw the last British Grand Prix on this track. The full circuit was closed in 1964 although club events continued until 1982. Even though disused, the track survived into the 21st century.

These developments were not sufficient for financial stability at Aintree. The racing calendar declined from the 1950s and 60s so that by the early 1970s it consisted of a single three-day meeting each year that included the Grand National. In addition, the stands and facilities had become notably dilapidated. When the Earl of Sefton sold the Aintree Racecourse to Tophams Ltd in 1949, he put a restrictive covenant in place that the land could only be used for agriculture or horse-racing during his life. (He died in 1972.) In 1963, Mirabel Topham, as chairman, initiated negotiations with Lord Sefton to have this covenant put aside so that the land could be sold for housing development. Over the next nine years this led to court cases, possible sales and repeated assertions that each Grand National would be 'the last at Aintree'. Although the covenant was upheld by the lower courts, an appeal to the House of Lords ruled in Topham Ltd's favour in 1966. Aintree was finally sold to the Walton Group owned by property developer William Davies in 1973. However, planning permission for new housing was never granted. The land remained a racecourse where the Grand National continues to be held.

Mirabel Topham was a patron of the arts and benefactor of the Walker Art Gallery in Liverpool. In 1949 she introduced an annual silversmithing competition to design and create the silver Topham Trophy. A television programme about her was shown nationally on BBC1 in 1972. In 1973 she allowed filming at Aintree for Dead Cert (based on a Dick Francis novel) that starred Judi Dench and Michael Williams.

== Later life ==
She had extensive contacts and a social life with the sports and media world. For example, she was godmother to Amanda, the eldest daughter of Peter Dimmock, one of the BBC's first sports broadcasters and later a senior executive. Following the sale of the racecourse she continued to live at Paddock Lodge for the rest of her life. She also owned a house in Regent's Park, London and a holiday home on the Isle of Wight. She died at home of cancer on 29 May 1980 aged 88 and is buried in the Topham family vault in the Catholic monastery at Pantasaph in North Wales.
