= Peter Dimmock =

British sports broadcaster

Peter Dimmock OBE CVO
- Born: Peter Harold Moss Dimmock; 6 December 1920; Brixton, London, England
- Died: 20 November 2015 (aged 94); Upton Grey, Hampshire, England
- Occupations: Sports broadcaster; Television producer; Television executive
- Years active: 1946–2000
- Employers: BBC (1946–1977); American Broadcasting Company (1977–1990)
- Spouses: Pamela Gladys Brealey (m. 1951; div. 1958) Polly Elwes (m. 1960; died 1987) Christabel Rosamund Bagge (m. 1990)
- Children: 3

Peter Harold Moss Dimmock OBE CVO (6 December 1920 – 20 November 2015) was a British sports broadcaster, television producer and television executive for the BBC. He began his career as a racing correspondent for the Press Association before joining the BBC as a producer and commentator at their Outside Broadcasts television department, working on almost 2,000 outside broadcasts. Dimmock was the first host of the BBC's long-running Grandstand and of the BBC Sports Review of the Year awards and the weekly live sports programme Sportsview from 1954 to 1964. He was assistant head of outside broadcasts from 1949 before becoming its head in 1954 until 1972, securing broadcast agreements for boxing, cricket, ice hockey, rugby, swimming and tennis and major state events. Dimmock worked at the American network American Broadcasting Company (ABC) as the vice-president of Worldwide Syndication and Marketing for ABC Sports and later as the director of the cable and satellite sports channel ESPN from 1984 to 1990. He was appointed Officer of the Order of the British Empire (OBE) and Commander of the Victorian Order (CVO).

== Early life and war service ==
Dimmock was born on 6 December 1920 in Brixton, London. He was the son of the electrical engineer Frederick Moss Dimmock and his wife Ruby Pauline Sterling (née Hudd). Dimmock attended Dulwich College in South West London and a finishing establishment in France. He was first employed by the BBC as a clerk in publications in 1937. When the Second World War broke out, Dimmock joined the Royal Army Service Corps, a territorial unit, and served as a driver. He was called up only two months later to serve in France during the retreat from Dunkirk. In March 1941 Dimmock was allowed to transfer into the Royal Air Force (RAF) after taking advantage of a scheme allowing Army personnel to transfer to the RAF to train as pilots. After finishing his training, he became a pilot officer and went to a flying instructor course. Then in 1943 Dimmock became a flying instructor on Tiger Moth and Miles Magister trainers with the rank of Flight Lieutenant. In February 1944 he was appointed as a staff officer at the Air Ministry's Directorate of Flying Training.

== Television career ==
After demobilisation in January 1946, Dimmock briefly joined the Press Association as a racing correspondent because he realised he wanted to become a journalist. He returned to the BBC in May of that year as a producer and commentator at their Outside Broadcasts television department at Alexandra Palace, working on almost 2,000 outside broadcasts. His first job was on a golf match at Alexandra Palace, introduced the first television coverage of Royal Ascot in 1947, and helped to arrange 70 hours of television coverage of the 1948 London Olympics, which he also commented on. The following year he provided commentary on the University Boat Race between Cambridge and Oxford, but most of his commentaries were on horse racing. Dimmock was made deputy manager of outside broadcasts in 1947 and became assistant head of outside broadcasts in 1949. In 1950, he produced coverage of the BBC's first televised test cricket match at Trent Bridge. That August, Dimmock helped to organise the first live international television broadcast to Britain from Calais. He travelled to New York City to study American programmes and organising remote pick-ups on television.

Dimmock produced programmes such as Television Sports Magazine, a series of programmes for the Come Dancing series (he also compered editions of the programme) that were broadcast within the first three months of 1952, the monthly series Television Icetime in 1954. As assistant head of outside broadcasts, he was in charge of events such as the funeral of George V in February 1952, and the Coronation of Elizabeth II in June 1953, preparing for the job by studying the American television coverage of the first inauguration of Dwight D. Eisenhower. He provided commentary on the 1953 British Games at White City Stadium, London, the final races of the fourth match of the 1953 International Speedway series between England and Scotland at Motherwell Speedway, and an international swimming gala of continental champions against British champions in January 1954.

He launched a televisual coverage from April 1954 in front of the cameras as the regular presenter of a new live weekly sport news programme Sportsview (which became Sportsnight in 1968), with what would be a long-running Speedway series. In its first year the series featured Roger Bannister's record breaking four-minute mile run. The BBC Sports Review of the Year (today the Sports Personality of the Year) also started in 1954 – with Dimmock again taking the presenter role, which he was to continue for over a decade. Dimmock established the BBC Sportsview Unit in 1954, and was eager to publicise it by the installation of large placards fitted to the sides of commercial helicopters hired by the BBC to transport film to Lime Grove Studios. That November, he was appointed head of the Outside Broadcasts department (renamed to General Manager, Outside Broadcasts Television in June 1961), the youngest person to lead a BBC department at the time. He secured broadcast agreements for boxing, cricket, ice hockey, rugby, swimming and tennis.

He presented the Inter-Regional Dancing Contest between dancers from each of the six BBC regions that ran from January to April 1957, and helped with Prince Philip, Duke of Edinburgh's first television broadcast in The Restless Sphere: The Story of the International Geophysical Year that same year. In January 1957, he went to New York to study how the second inauguration of Dwight D. Eisenhower was broadcast on television in the United States and was impressed by the use of a portable television camera with a radio link that the BBC plan to experiment with. Dimmock took part in the 1958 Monte Carlo Rally as the co-driver of a Humber Hawk, and again in 1959 and 1960, both times driving a Ford Zephyr. Dimmock presented the afternoon programme Junior Sportsview for viewers between the ages of 10 and 15 in 1956, and fronted the first two programmes of the Saturday afternoon rolling sports programme Grandstand in October 1958 before handing over to David Coleman, but staying as producer.

He directed the first televised State Opening of Parliament in 1958, the Grand National in 1960 after a long campaign to persuade Aintree Racecourse owner Mirabel Topham to let the event be televised, and the Wedding of Princess Margaret and Antony Armstrong-Jones in 1960. Between 1959 and 1972, he was chairman and sports adviser of the sports committee of the European Broadcasting Union, ensuring that the 1960 Summer Olympics in Rome received global broadcast coverage. In 1961, Dimmock drove in the Monte Carlo Rally in a chartered Austin FX3 London taxicab. The cab he shared with Tony Brooks and co-driver Bob Gerard retired with gearbox problems in the Central French mountains. That same year, Dimmock travelled to Moscow and successfully negotiated with the State Committee of Television and Radio Broadcasting of the Soviet Union the broadcast of the country's May Day Parade to Britain.

In February 1962, he was sued by the boxer John Caldwell for alleged libel over comments Dimmock made during an edition of Sportsview. Two months later, Dimmock was appointed chairman of the BBC/ITV Satellite Programme Committee, and was part of an "inner cabinet" to deal with the issue of planning two programmes prior to the launch of BBC2. In 1963, Dimmock became liaison officer for the BBC to the British royal family, holding the position until 1977. He presented his final Sportsview in April 1964 because of time constraints, and was a judge at Miss World 1969, He continued to lead the Outside Broadcasts department until September 1972 and became general manager of BBC Radio and Television Enterprises at Villiers House, Ealing. Dimmock oversaw the promotion of television and radio programmes, BBC records, merchandise and an increase in the department's pre-tax profits from £700,000 to £1,250,000 by streamlining ways of administration and marketing.

Dimmock retired from the BBC in February 1977. In April of that year, Dimmock accepted an offer from his friend Roone Arledge to join the television department of the American network American Broadcasting Company (ABC). He took up the role of the vice-president of Worldwide Syndication and Marketing for ABC Sports. From 1984 to 1990, Dimmock was the director of ESPN, the American cable and satellite sports channel, and he was later moved to Monaco to become the managing director of ABC Sports International before it was absorbed into ABC Video Enterprises Division.

In 1990, Dimmock returned to the United Kingdom, and served as chairman of the independent production company Zenith Entertainment from 1991 to 2000. He also ran his own consultancy company called Peter Dimmock Enterprises. Dimmock retired in 2000. He was a part-time flying instructor at the London Aeroplane Club. Dimmock was the author of the Sportsview Annual from 1954 to 1965, Sports in View in 1964 and contributed to The BBC Book of Royal Memories in 1990. Between 1972 and 1977, Dimmock was a member of the London and South East Sports Council and chaired the Sports Development Panel from 1976 to 1977.

== Personal life ==
Dimmock was married three times. His first marriage was to the divorcee Pamela Gladys Brealey from 27 March 1951 until their divorce on 11 July 1958; the marriage was not mentioned in Dimmock's entry in Who's Who. His second marriage was to the BBC continuity announcer and What's My Line? panellist Polly Elwes on 12 March 1960. They remained married until Elwes's death from bone cancer in 1987. There were three children of the second marriage. On 8 June 1990 Dimmock married the widow Christabel Rosamund Bagge.

He died on 20 November 2015 of bronchopneumonia and cardiac failure at his home in Upton Grey, Hampshire. A memorial service for Dimmock took place at St Bride's Church, Fleet Street on the morning of 16 March 2016.

== Awards ==
He received various awards during his lifetime. Dimmock received the Silver Medal of Calais in 1950, and the Queen Elizabeth II Coronation Medal in 1953. He was appointed Officer of the Order of the British Empire (OBE) in the 1961 New Year Honours, and made a Commander of the Victorian Order (CVO) in 1968 for easing relations between the Royal Family and the BBC. Dimmock was elected a Freeman of the City of London in 1977, and a fellow of the Royal Television Society (RTS) in 1978. He was admitted to the RTS' Hall of Fame in 1996, and received the Special Judges Award at the 2004 RTS Sports Awards.

Preceded by new appointment	Host of Grandstand; 1958 (first two shows)	Succeeded by David Coleman
Preceded by new appointment	Regular Host of Sportsview; 1954–1964	Succeeded by Frank Bough
