= Estelle Roberts =

British Spiritualist medium

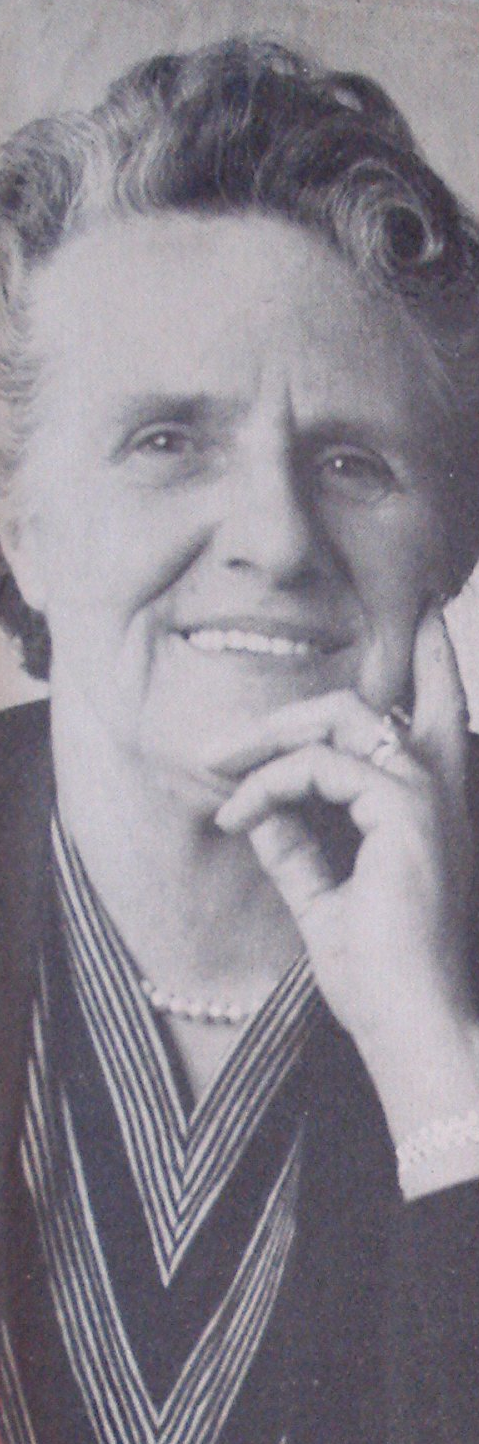
- Roberts in 1959
- Born: 10 May 1889; Kensington, London, England
- Died: 30 May 1970 (aged 81); Poole, Dorset, England
- Occupation: Spiritualist medium

Estelle Roberts (10 May 1889 – 30 May 1970) was a British Spiritualist medium.

== Life and career ==
Roberts is regarded by the British Spiritualist Movement as one of its finest exponents of mediumship in the 20th century but sceptics have not been convinced by her alleged powers. She claimed both physical and mental mediumship, and the teachings of her guide, a Native American Indian, known as Red Cloud, have been published. She toured the United Kingdom giving mediumship demonstrations for money.

On 13 July 1930 thousands of people attended the Royal Albert Hall for Arthur Conan Doyle's memorial service. During the service Roberts gave a mediumship demonstration to the audience and claimed to witnessed Doyle's spirit in a chair.

She wrote the book Forty Years a Medium (1959). The book was described in a review by journalist Tom Greenwell as non-scientific and was questioned how anyone apart from the author could take it seriously. The spirit guide of Roberts known as Red Cloud made false predictions. He predicted that World War II was not going to break out and that there was going to be peace. Roberts refused for her mediumship to be tested or observed by any scientist or psychical researcher. The Society for Psychical Research offered to test her abilities but she declined to be tested.

Roberts claimed to materialise an Indian spirit guide called "Red Cloud". Researcher Melvin Harris who examined some photographs of Red Cloud suggested that the face was the same as Roberts and she had dressed up in a feathered war bonnet.

== Publications ==
- Red Cloud Speaks (1938)
- Forty Years a Medium (1959)
- Fifty Years a Medium (1972)
