= Billing, Northamptonshire =

Civil parish in Northamptonshire, England

Coordinates: 52.2577°N 0.8222°W

Billing
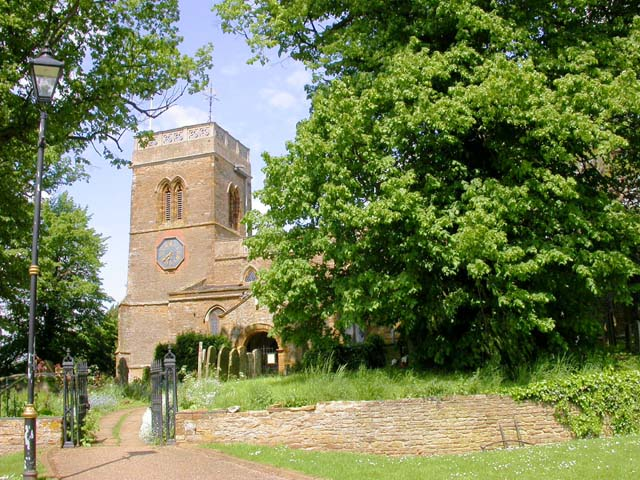
- St Andrew's Church

- Location within Northamptonshire
- Population: 8,457 (2001)
- OS grid reference: SP8062
- Civil parish: Billing
- Unitary authority: West Northamptonshire
- Ceremonial county: Northamptonshire
- Region: East Midlands
- Country: England
- Sovereign state: United Kingdom
- Post town: Northampton
- Postcode district: NN3
- Dialling code: 01604
- Police: Northamptonshire
- Fire: Northamptonshire
- Ambulance: East Midlands
- UK Parliament: Northampton South

Billing is a civil parish in eastern Northampton, in the West Northamptonshire district, in the ceremonial county of Northamptonshire, England. It covers the Great Billing, Little Billing, Ecton Brook and Bellinge areas. It is geographically the largest area of Northampton. According to the 2001 census the parish had a population of 8,642, decreasing at the 2011 census to 8,457. Billing consists of four estates, with each estate constituting a ward of the parish. Great Billing and Little Billing were developed around the existing villages; Bellinge (or Middle Ward) and Ecton Brook were created as new communities. Billing is accessible by the A45 westward to Northampton which runs along the south side of Billing and is accessed through the Lumbertubs Way Interchange.

Billing Aquadrome, a large leisure centre including lakes, a fair and also a caravan site which is home to over 2,000 people. Billing Aquadrome used to host the Northampton Balloon Festival which had previously for a number of years been situated at Racecourse Park in the Town Centre, before moving back to the Racecourse Park in the Town Centre.

There is a contrast of housing within the Billing ward with large houses dotted around Great Billing and Little Billing keeping the traditional 'village feel' as when both were villages. On the other side there is Bellinge and Ecton Brook; estates built in the 1970s and 80s as new towns to house the overspill of London and other areas which are council estates. Bellinge in particular had suffered from serious problems in the 1990s and became one of the most crime ridden estates in England suffering from drug dealing and vandalism until the local council demolished a series of flats which stood on what is now Billingmead Square. The estate is now much improved and does not suffer the serious problems it had once encountered.

== History ==
The parish was formed on 1 April 1935 from "Great Billing" and "Little Billing", on 1 April 1965 Billing gained 127 acres when Weston Favell was abolished.

== See also ==
- Daniel Cawdry, seventeenth-century clergyman of the Billing parish church
- Ecton
- Billing Hall
- Our Lady of Perpetual Succour Church, Great Billing
