= Billing Hall =

Coordinates: 52°15′33″N 0°48′56″W

Billing Hall was a manor house in Billing, Northamptonshire, England. Records of the manor, the predecessor to Great Billing Hall, date back to the 12th century. It was originally owned by the Barry family and Baron Dundalk built it in 1629. It became the county seat of the Earls of Thomond, descendants of Brian Boru, King of Ireland in 1002. With the arrival of the Elwes family in 1779 the history of Great Billing became inextricably linked to them. Perhaps the Hall's most famous resident was Gervase Elwes, the English tenor, who died in a rail accident in Boston, Massachusetts, US, in 1921.

== Arrival of the Elwes family ==
In the mid-1500s the religious ethos of Billing was changed for the next 300 years by the Reformation. The local Priory was dissolved and the churches became Anglican. The Cromwellian Revolution was strongly backed in this area and even following the restoration of the Monarchy a very strong Nonconformist element continued on. Slowly, any of traces Catholicism vanished and by 1800 they were confined to a few recusant families, itinerant workmen mostly from Ireland, served by a small number of discreet priests. This changed, however, with the arrival of the Elwes family. In 1779, Robert Cary Elwes, of Roxby, Lincolnshire bought Billing Hall, which by then had been rebuilt in the Palladian style by John Carr for the property's previous owner, Lord John Cavendish, in 1776. Close by the Hall, at Billing Lings, Elwes bred horses including two Derby winners, Mameluke in 1827 and Cossack in 1847. The estate was eventually taken over by his grandson Valentine Cary-Elwes who was received into the Catholic Church in France in 1874. Immediately he erected a chapel at the Hall and encouraged his estate employees to attend Mass there. His son, Dudley Cary-Elwes, subsequently 5th Bishop of Northampton 1921-1932, described how his father persuaded the Bishop to post a priest to the village. The former parish priest of Wolverton, Father (later Canon) Blackman, had just become available and was deemed ideal. He stayed as priest until 1907. The Elwes family at one time owned the whole of the village of Great Billing with the exception of one house and five cottages.

== Return to Catholicism ==
With Cary-Elwes' assistance, Blackman introduced many villagers to the Catholic faith. Initially Mass was said in the Hall chapel, but this soon became too small, so a small church was built in a simple classical style. A Catholic primary school was also started in what is now the village hall, but this did not last beyond World War I.

== Music at the hall ==
On Mr. Cary-Elwes' death, his son, Gervase Elwes, the famous tenor, took over the estate. Married to the Earl of Denbigh's daughter, Lady Winifride Feilding, and having a gregarious nature, he made the Hall and village both the centre of Catholic life and the musical focus for the area. Elwes was friends with many of the eminent musicians of the day including Ralph Vaughan Williams and Edward Elgar. He was Elgar's favourite Gerontius, singing this demanding role 118 times. He held many musical soirées at the Hall and famous musicians came from far and wide to attend. He and many members of his family, including his parents, his brother Bishop Dudley, and his son, Monsignor Valentine Elwes, who was parish priest of the village in the 1960s, are buried in the Catholic cemetery in the village. His second youngest daughter, Margaret, was buried there in 1997, aged 91 years. The Hall was sold in 1930 by Geoffrey Elwes and, a project for converting it into a home for indigent musicians in memory of Gervase Elwes having failed, it was sold again in 1935 to Mr. Hancock, a shoe-manufacturer of Northampton, and by him to Mr. J. P. B. Miller, who pulled down part of the Hall. In the village of Great Billing is a bronze memorial tablet to Gervase Elwes (d. 1921), the 'beloved squire' and famous singer.

Although Billing Hall was not converted into a home for musicians, Elwes' contribution to music, his interest in amateur music-making, professional musicians who had fallen on hard times, and innovation created by composers, singers and instrumentalists working together, led to the foundation, in 1921, of the Gervase Elwes Memorial Fund for Musicians which was incorporated in 1930 as the Musicians Benevolent Fund.

== Demolition ==
For reasons unknown the Hall was demolished in 1956. What is now Great Billing Pocket Park occupies what was once part of the estate.
