= 1921 in music =

This is a list of notable events in music that took place in the year 1921.

== Specific locations ==
- 1921 in British music
- 1921 in Norwegian music

== Specific genres ==
- 1921 in country music
- 1921 in jazz

== Events ==
- January – Amelita Galli-Curci marries her accompanist, Homer Samuels, who had been named in her divorce from the Marchese Luigi Curci.
- June–July – The Harvard Glee Club takes its first trip to Europe, garnering international press attention.
- November – A month before his death, Camille Saint-Saëns, 86, gives a final recital.
- Clarence Williams makes his first recordings
- Mary Stafford becomes the first black woman to record for Columbia Records
- The 17-string koto, or "Jūshichi-gen", is invented by Michio Miyagi.
- Cyril Rootham dedicates his "Suite in Three Movements" for flute and piano to French flautist Louis Fleury.

== Published popular music ==
Ain't We Got Fun?
Ain't We Got Fun?, recorded by Billy Jones in 1921 for Edison Records.

w. — words, m. — music

- "Ain't We Got Fun?" w.m. Richard A. Whiting, Raymond Egan and Gus Kahn
- "All by Myself" w.m. Irving Berlin
- "And Her Mother Came Too" w. Dion Titheradge m. Ivor Novello
- "Any Time" w.m. Herbert Happy Lawson
- "April Showers" w. B. G. De Sylva m. Louis Silvers
- "Baltimore Buzz" w.m. Noble Sissle and Eubie Blake
- "Bandana Days" w.m. Noble Sissle and Eubie Blake
- "Bimini Bay" w. Gus Kahn and Raymond Egan m. Richard Whiting
- "Boy Wanted" w. Ira Gershwin m. George Gershwin
- "Dancing Time" w.(Eng) George Grossmith, Jr. (US) Howard Dietz m. Jerome Kern US words written 1924.
- "Dapper Dan" w. Lew Brown m. Albert Von Tilzer
- "Dear Old Southland" w. Henry Creamer m. Turner Layton
- "Dirty Hands, Dirty Face" w. Al Jolson, Grant Clarke, Edgar Leslie m. James V. Monaco
- "Down South" w. B. G. DeSylva m. Walter Donaldson. Introduced by Al Jolson in the musical Bombo
- "Down Yonder" w.m. L. Wolfe Gilbert
- "Everybody Step" w.m. Irving Berlin
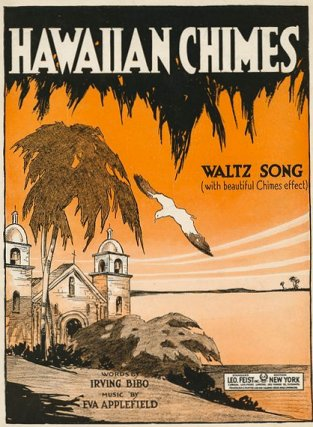
- "Hawaiian Chimes" w. Irving Bibo m. Eva Applefield
- I Ain't Nobody's Darling w. Elmer Hughes m. Robert A. King
- "I Found A Rose In The Devil's Garden" w.m. Fred Fisher and Willie Raskin
- "I Wonder If You Still Care For Me" w.m. Harry B. Smith and Francis Wheeler
- "I'll Forget You" w. Annelu Burns m. Ernest R. Ball
- "I'm Just Wild About Harry" w.m. Noble Sissle and Eubie Blake
- "I'm Nobody's Baby" w.m. Benny Davis, Milton Ager and Lester Santly
- "Jazz Me Blues" m. Tom Delaney
- "Keep Movin'" Helen Trix
- "Kitten On The Keys" m. Zez Confrey
- "Learn To Smile" w. Otto Harbach m. Louis A. Hirsch
- "Leave Me With A Smile" w.m. Charles Koehler and Earl Burtnett
- "Love Will Find A Way" w.m. Noble Sissle and Eubie Blake
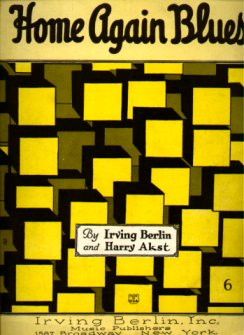
- "Ma! He's Making Eyes at Me" w. Sidney Clare m. Con Conrad
- "Make Believe" w. Benny Davis m. Jack Shilkret
- "Mandy 'N' Me" w. Bert Kalmar m. Con Conrad
- "My Sunny Tennessee" w.m. Bert Kalmar, Harry Ruby and Herman Ruby
- "Sally" w. Clifford Grey m. Jerome Kern
- "Say It With Music" w.m. Irving Berlin
- "Second Hand Rose" w. Grant Clarke m. James F. Hanley
- "The Sheik of Araby" w. Harry B. Smith and Francis Wheeler m. Ted Snyder
- "She's Mine, All Mine" w.m. Bert Kalmar and Harry Ruby
- "Shuffle Along w.m. Noble Sissle and Eubie Blake
- "Shimmy With Me" w. P. G. Wodehouse m. Jerome Kern from the musical The Cabaret Girl
- "Song Of Love" w. Dorothy Donnelly m. Sigmund Romberg
- "Strut Miss Lizzie" w. Henry Creamer m. Turner Layton
- "Sweet Lady" w. Howard Johnson m. Frank Crumit and Dave Zoob
- "Ten Little Fingers And Ten Little Toes" w. Harry Pease and Johnny White m. Ira Schuster and Ed G. Nelson
- "There'll Be Some Changes Made" w. Billy Higgins m. Benton Overstreet
- "Tuck Me To Sleep In My Old 'Tucky Home" w. Sam H. Lewis and Joe Young m. George W. Meyer
- "Wabash Blues" w. Dave Ringle m. Fred Meinken
- "When Big Profundo Sang Low C" w. Marion T. Bohannon m. George Botsford
- "When Buddha Smiles" w. Arthur Freed m. Nacio Herb Brown
- "When Shall We Meet Again" w. Raymond B. Egan m. Richard A. Whiting
- "Whip-poor-will" w. B. G. De Sylva m. Jerome Kern
- "Yoo-Hoo" w. B. G. De Sylva m. Al Jolson

== Top Popular Recordings 1921 ==
The following songs achieved the highest positions in Joel Whitburn's Pop Memories 1890-1954 and record sales reported on the "Discography of American Historical Recordings" website during 1921: Numerical rankings are approximate, they are only used as a frame of reference.

Rank	Artist	Title	Label	Recorded	Released	Chart Positions
1	Paul Whiteman and His Ambassador Orchestra	"Wang Wang Blues"	Victor 18694	August 19, 1920	December 1920	US Billboard 1921 #1, US #1 for 6 weeks, 17 total weeks, 457,000 sold 1921, later RCA Victor announced 1,000,000
2	Isham Jones Orchestra	"Wabash Blues"	Brunswick 5065	August 1, 1921	October 1921	US Billboard 1921 #2, US #1 for 6 weeks, 12 total weeks, 1,750,000 sold 1921-1922
3	Paul Whiteman and His Orchestra	"Cherie"	Victor 18758	August 9, 1920	July 1921	US Billboard 1921 #3, US #1 for 6 weeks, 12 total weeks, 405,647 sales
4	Paul Whiteman and His Orchestra	"Song of India"	Victor 18777	August 23, 1921	September 1921	US Billboard 1921 #5, US #1 for 5 weeks, 14 total weeks, 1,000,000 sold
5	Paul Whiteman and His Orchestra	"Say It with Music"	Victor 18803	April 21, 1921	November 12, 1921	US Billboard 1921 #4, US #1 for 5 weeks, 14 total weeks
6	Eddie Cantor	"Margie"	Emerson 10301	December 15, 1920	January 1921	US Billboard 1921 #6, US #1 for 5 weeks, 12 total weeks, 1,000,000 sold
7	Paul Whiteman and His Orchestra	"My Mammy-Beautiful Faces Medley"	Victor 18737	March 1, 1921	May 1921	US Billboard 1921 #7, US #1 for 5 weeks, 12 total weeks, 1,000,000 sales
8	Ted Lewis and His Band	"All by Myself"	Columbia 3434	June 11, 1921	September 1921	US Billboard 1921 #8, US #1 for 4 weeks, 12 total weeks
9	Al Jolson	"O-H-I-O (O My! O!)"	Columbia 3361	December 13, 1920	April 1921	US Billboard 1921 #9, US #1 for 4 weeks, 7 total weeks
10	Nora Bayes (Charles Prince Orchestra)	"Make Believe"	Columbia 3392	March 1, 1921	September 1921	US Billboard 1921 #10, US #1 for 3 weeks, 10 total weeks
11	Marion Harris	"Look for the Silver Lining"	Columbia 3367	December 29, 1920	April 1921	US Billboard 1921 #11, US #1 for 3 weeks, 10 total weeks
22	Mamie Smith & Her Jazz Hounds	"Crazy Blues"	Okeh 4169	August 10, 1920	November 1920	US Billboard 1920 #11, US #3 for 1 week, 11 total weeks, National Recording Registry 2005
24	Marion Harris	"I Ain't Got Nobody"	Columbia 3371	April 21, 1920	May 1921	US Billboard 1921 #24, US #3 for 1 weeks, 7 total weeks
28	The Original Dixieland Jazz Band	"Palesteena (Lena from Palesteena)"	Victor 18717	December 4, 1920	February 1921	US Billboard 1921 #28, US #3 for 1 weeks, 5 total weeks

== Classical music ==
- Agustín Barrios – La Catedral
- George Enescu – Symphony No. 3 in C major, Op. 21 (revised version)
- Gabriel Fauré
  - Cello Sonata No. 2
  - Piano Quintet No. 2 in C minor, Op. 115
- John Foulds – A World Requiem (1919–21; premiered 1923)
- Howard Hanson – Before the Night
- Albert Ketèlbey
  - Bells Across the Meadows
  - In a Persian Market
- Carl Nielsen – Moderen (stage music)
- Henrique Oswald – String Quartet No. 4 in C minor, Op. 46
- Willem Pijper
  - Symphony No. 2
  - Trio No. 2 for violin, violoncello & piano
- Sergei Prokofiev – Piano Concerto No. 3 in C Major
- Camille Saint-Saëns
  - Oboe Sonata, Op. 166
  - Clarinet Sonata, Op. 167
  - Bassoon Sonata, Op. 168
- Edgard Varèse
  - Offrandes
  - Amériques (1918–21)
- Ralph Vaughan Williams
  - The Lark Ascending, version for violin & orchestra
  - A Pastoral Symphony
- Heitor Villa-Lobos – Fantasia de Movimentos Mistos, for violin & orchestra
- Arnold Schoenberg – Suite for Piano Op. 25
- John Ireland – Two Pieces for Piano

== Opera ==
- Franco Alfano – La leggenda di Sakùntala
- Nicolae Bretan – Luceafarul
- Paul Hindemith – Mörder, Hoffnung der Frauen and Das Nusch-Nuschi (premiered together June 4 at Württembergisches Landestheater, Stuttgart)
- Leoš Janáček – Káťa Kabanová
- Hans Jelmoli – Die Badener Fahrt
- Emmerich Kálmán – Die Bajadere
- Pietro Mascagni – Il piccolo Marat
- Franco Vittadini – Anima allegra

== Film ==
- Paul Hindemith – Im Kampf mit dem Berge

== Musical theater ==
"I'm Just Wild About Harry"
Instrumental version of "I'm Just Wild About Harry" from the musical Shuffle Along by Noble Sissle & Eubie Blake. Recorded May 17, 1922.

- Bombo, Broadway production opened at Jolson's 59th Street Theatre on October 6 and ran for 213 performances
- The Broadway Whirl, Broadway revue opened at the Times Square Theatre on June 8 and ran for 85 performances
- The Golden Moth (Music: Ivor Novello) London production opened at the Adelphi Theatre on October 5. Starring Bobbie Comber and Thorpe Bates.
- Good Morning, Dearie, Broadway production opened at the Globe Theatre on November 1 and ran for 347 performances
- Pot Luck London production opened at the Vaudeville Theatre on December 24.
- The League of Notions London revue opened at the Oxford Theatre on January 17
- The Rebel Maid London production opened at the Empire Theatre on March 12 and ran for 114 performances.
- The Rose Girl (Music: Anselm Goetzl Book & Lyrics: William Carey Duncan) Broadway production opened at the Ambassador Theatre on February 11 and ran for 99 performances. Starring Mabel Withee, Charles Purcell and May Boley.
- Sally, London production opened at the Winter Garden Theatre on September 10 and ran for 387 performances
- Shuffle Along, Broadway production opened at the Daly's 63rd Street Theatre on May 23 and ran for 504 performances
- Sybil, London production opened at Daly's Theatre on February 19 and ran for 346 performances

== Births ==
- January 10 – Helen Bonchek Schneyer, folk musician (died 2005)
- January 17 – Lorna Cooke deVaron, choral conductor (died 2018)
- January 22 – Arno Babajanian, composer (died 1983)
- January 26 – Eddie Barclay, music producer (died 2005)
- January 31
  - Carol Channing, musical comedy star (died 2019)
  - Mario Lanza, operatic tenor and film star (died 1959)
- February 5 – Sir John Pritchard, British conductor (died 1989)
- February 13 – Jeanne Demessieux, French organist and composer (died 1968)
- February 16 – Vera-Ellen, dancer and actress (died 1981)
- February 20 – Ruth Gipps, composer (died 1999)
- February 26 – Betty Hutton, actress and singer (died 2007)
- March 2 – Robert Simpson, musicologist and composer (died 1997)
- March 6 – Julius Rudel, conductor (died 2014)
- March 8 – Cyd Charisse, dancer (died 2008)
- March 11 – Ástor Piazzolla, tango composer (died 1992)
- March 12 – Gordon MacRae, singer and actor (died 1986)
- March 21
  - Arthur Grumiaux, violinist (died 1986)
  - Antony Hopkins, composer and music writer (died 2014)
- March 22 – Nino Manfredi, actor and film score composer (died 2004)
- March 27 – Phil Chess, born Fiszel Czyż, record producer (died 2016)
- March 28 – Rostislav Berberov, music theorist and musicologist (died 1984)
- April 1
  - Douglas Allanbrook, composer (died 2003)
  - William Bergsma, composer (died 1994)
  - Arthur "Guitar Boogie" Smith, musician and composer (died 2014)
- April 3 – Darío Moreno, Turkish singer and composer (died 1968)
- April 8
  - Alfie Bass, actor (Tevye in West End production of Fiddler on the Roof) (died 1987)
  - Franco Corelli, operatic tenor (died 2003)
- April 22 – Cándido Camero, percussionist (died 2020)
- April 26 – Jimmy Giuffre, jazz musician (died 2008)
- May 17
  - Dennis Brain, horn virtuoso (died 1957)
  - Bob Merrill, US songwriter (died 1998)
- May 23 – Humphrey Lyttelton, English jazz musician (died 2008)
- May 25 – Hal David – US lyricist (died 2012)
- May 26 – Inge Borkh, German soprano (died 2018)
- June 1 – Nelson Riddle, US conductor, composer and arranger (died 1985)
- June 3 – Betty Freeman, patron of classical music (died 2009)
- June 21
  - Judy Holliday, US actress and singer (died 1965)
  - Jane Russell, US actress and singer (died 2011)
- June 24 – Peggy DeCastro, US singer born in the Dominican Republic, eldest of the DeCastro Sisters (died 2004)
- June 25 – Celia Franca, dancer and choreographer (died 2007)
- July 12 – Hilary Corke, writer and composer (died 2001)
- July 15 – Jack Beeson, American pianist and composer (died 2010)
- July 17
  - George Barnes, American swing jazz guitarist (died 1977)
  - Mary Osborne, American jazz guitarist (died 1992)
- July 20 – Carmen Carrozza, accordionist (died 2013)
- July 24 – Giuseppe Di Stefano, opera singer (died 2008)
- July 30 – Grant Johannesen, American pianist (died 2005)
- August 3 – Richard Adler, American composer and lyricist (died 2012)
- August 4 – Herb Ellis, American guitarist (died 2010)
- August 7
  - Manitas de Plata, French Gitano flamenco guitarist (died 2014)
  - Karel Husa, Czech-born classical composer (died 2016)
- August 9 – Lola Bobesco, Belgian violinist (died 2003)
- August 13 – Mary Lee, Scottish singer (died 2022)
- September 3 – Thurston Dart, English musicologist, conductor and keyboard player (died 1971)
- September 4 – Ariel Ramírez, Argentine composer (died 2010)
- September 8 – Sir Harry Secombe, Welsh singer and comedian (died 2001)
- September 19 – Billy Ward, R&B singer (The Dominoes) (died 2002)
- September 21 – Chico Hamilton, jazz drummer (died 2013)
- September 30 – Pedro Knight, Cuban musician, manager (died 2007)
- October 1 – James Whitmore, American actor in film musicals (died 2009)
- October 21
  - Sir Malcolm Arnold, English composer (died 2006)
  - Jarmil Burghauser, Czech conductor, composer and musicologist (died 1997)
- October 23
  - Denise Duval, French soprano (died 2016)
  - İlhan Usmanbaş, Turkish composer (died 2025)
- October 25 – Little Hatch, American blues musician (died 2003)
- November 5 – Georges Cziffra, pianist (died 1994)
- November 9 – Pierrette Alarie, soprano (died 2011)
- November 21 – Vivian Blaine, actress and singer (died 1995)
- November 23 – Fred Buscaglione, Italian singer, musician and songwriter (died 1960)
- December 3 – Phyllis Curtin, soprano (died 2016)
- December 4 – Deanna Durbin, singer and actress (died 2013)
- December 8 – Johnny Otis, blues musician (died 2012)
- December 15 – Alan Freed, disc jockey (died 1965)
- December 26 – Steve Allen, musician and comedian (died 2000)

== Deaths ==
- January 23 – Władysław Żeleński, pianist, organist and composer (born 1837)
- February 8
  - George Formby Sr, singer (born 1875; pulmonary tuberculosis)
  - Francisco D'Andrade, opera singer (born 1856)
- March 14 – Gustave Barnes, artist and musician (born 1877)
- March 24 – Déodat de Séverac, composer (born 1872)
- April 3 – Annie Louise Cary, operatic contralto (born 1842)
- April 5 – Alphons Diepenbrock, composer and writer (born 1862)
- April 7 – Víctor Mirecki Larramat, cellist (born 1847)
- April 20 – Tony Jackson, pianist, singer and composer (born 1876; cirrhosis of the liver)
- May 4 – Max Kalbeck, music writer and critic (born 1850)
- June 8 – Natalie Bauer-Lechner, viola player (born 1858)
- July 9 – Marianne Brandt, operatic contralto (born 1842)
- August 2 – Enrico Caruso, operatic tenor (born 1873; peritonitis)
- August 8 – Arthur Pougin, music critic (born 1834)
- September 3 – Rosa Linde, contralto
- September 27
  - Engelbert Humperdinck, composer (born 1854; heart attack)
  - Zdzisław Birnbaum, violinist and conductor (born 1878)
- September 28 – Princess Pauline von Metternich, patron of composers including Wagner and Smetana (born 1836)
- October 4 – Sophie Stehle, operatic soprano (born 1838)
- November 20 – Christina Nilsson, operatic soprano (born 1843)
- November 25 – Théodore Lack, pianist (born 1846)
- November 29 – Ivan Caryll, composer of operettas (born 1861; haemorrhage)
- November 30 – Henry Behr, founder of the piano manufacturing company, Behr Brothers & Co. (born 1848)
- December 10 – Victor Jacobi, composer of operettas (born 1883; illness)
- December 16 – Camille Saint-Saëns, composer (born 1835; tuberculosis)
- December 25 – Hans Huber, composer (born 1852)
