= List of artistic works with Orientalist influences =

This is an incomplete list of artistic works with Orientalist influences.

== Art ==
- David Roberts, The Holy Land, Syria, Idumea, Arabia, Egypt, and Nubia (1842)
- Théodore Chassériau, Arab Chiefs Challenging each other to Single Combat under the Ramparts of a City (1852)
- Léon Belly, Pélerins allant à La Mecque (1861)
- Gustave Guillaumet, Evening Prayer in the Sahara (1863)
- Alfred Dehodencq, Boabdil’s Farewell to Granada (1869)
- Henri Regnault, Summary Execution under the Moorish Kings of Granada (1870)
- Jean-Joseph Benjamin-Constant, Le jour des funérailles - Scène du Maroc (1889)

== Literature ==
- The Travels of Marco Polo, 13th century
- Travels of Sir John Mandeville, 14th century invented account of travels
- Fernão Mendes Pinto, Peregrinação (1556), the most complete of the early Portuguese written accounts of the Indic, southeast Asia, China and Japan
- Christopher Marlowe, Tamburlaine, 1588/89
- John Dryden, Aureng-zebe (1675), a heroic drama in theory based on the life of the reigning Mughal Emperor, Aurangzeb
- Antoine Galland – Les mille et une nuits (1704–1717), first European translation of Arabian Nights
- François Pétis de la Croix — Les mille et un jours (The Thousand and One Days) (1710–1712)
- Montesquieu – Persian Letters (Lettres persanes) (1721)
- Voltaire — Zadig (1747)
- James Ridley — The Tales of the Genii (1764)
- William Thomas Beckford – Vathek (1786)
- Jacques Cazotte and Dom Denis Chavis — Continuation des mille et une nuits (Continuation of the Thousand and One Nights) (1788–1790)
- Robert Southey – Thalaba the Destroyer (1801)
- Robert Southey – Curse of Kehama (1810)
- Lord Byron – his four "Turkish tales": The Bride of Abydos, The Giaour, The Corsair (1814), Lara, A Tale (1814), and other works
- Samuel Taylor Coleridge – Kubla Khan (published 1816)
- Thomas Moore – Lalla-Rookh (published 1817)
- Johann Wolfgang von Goethe – Westöstlicher Diwan (1819)
- Alexander Pushkin – Ruslan and Ludmila, (1820)
- Ralph Waldo Emerson – poem Indian Superstition (1821)
- Edgar Allan Poe – Tamerlane (1827), Al Aaraaf (1829), and Israfel (1831)
- Victor Hugo – Les Orientales (1829)
- George Meredith — The Shaving of Shagpat: An Arabian Entertainment (1856)
- Gustave Flaubert – Salammbô (1862)
- Eça de Queiroz – The Relic (A Relíquia) (1887) and The Mandarin (O Mandarim) (1889)
- Anatole France – Thaïs (1890)
- Edward FitzGerald – "translation" or adaptation of the Persian Rubaiyat of Omar Khayyam (1859)
- Pierre Loti (1850–1923) – highly popular French writer, mostly on his Oriental travels & novels set as far away as Japan and Tahiti
- Richard Francis Burton – translation of The Book of One Thousand and One Nights (1885–1888)
- Rudyard Kipling - The Jungle Book (1894)
- Gaston Leroux – Phantom of the Opera (1911)
- Leo Tolstoy – Hadji Murat (1912)
- Victor Segalen – René Leys (1922)
- Hermann Hesse – Siddhartha (1922)
- James Hilton – Lost Horizon (1933)
- André Malraux – Man's Fate (1934) (La Condition humaine, 1933)
- George Orwell – Burmese Days (1934)
- Marguerite Yourcenar – Nouvelles orientales (1938)

== Opera, ballets, musicals ==
- Antonio Lucio Vivaldi – Juditha triumphans (1716)
- Georg Friedrich Händel – Tamerlano (1724) and Serse (1738)
- Jean-Georges Noverre – Les Fêtes Chinoises (1754)
- Jean-Philippe Rameau – Les Indes Galantes (1735–1736)
- Wolfgang Amadeus Mozart – Die Entführung aus dem Serail (1782)
- Gioachino Rossini – Semiramide (1823)
- Giuseppe Verdi – Nabucco (1842)
- Jacques Offenbach – Ba-ta-clan (1855)
- Georges Bizet – Les Pêcheurs de Perles (1863)
- Giuseppe Verdi – Aida (1871)
- Emmanuel Chabrier – Fisch-Ton-Kan (1875)
- César Cui – The Mandarin's Son (1878)
- Gilbert and Sullivan – The Mikado (1885)
- Alexander Borodin – Prince Igor (1890)
- Sidney Jones – The Geisha (1896)
- Sidney Jones – San Toy (1899)
- Pietro Mascagni – Iris (1899)
- Howard Talbot – A Chinese Honeymoon (1896)
- Giacomo Puccini – Madama Butterfly (1904)
- Richard Strauss – Salome, opera in one act based on Wilde's play (1905)
- Giacomo Puccini – Turandot (1926)
- Franz Lehár – The Land of Smiles (1929)
- Sigmund Romberg – Oscar Hammerstein II and Otto Harbach – The Desert Song (1926) and film (1929)
- Richard Strauss – Die ägyptische Helena, opera with libretto by Hugo von Hofmannsthal (1929)

== Orchestral works ==
- Mily Balakirev – Tamara
- Alexander Borodin – In the Steppes of Central Asia; "Polovetsian Dances" from Prince Igor
- Mikhail Ippolitov-Ivanov – Caucasian Sketches
- Modest Mussorgsky – "Dance of the Persian Slaves" from Khovanshchina
- Nikolai Rimsky-Korsakov – Antar; Scheherezade
- Gustav Mahler – Das Lied von der Erde

== Shorter musical pieces ==
- Mily Balakirev – Islamey
- Ludwig van Beethoven – Turkish March from The Ruins of Athens, opus 113 (1811)
- Johann Joseph Fux – partita Turcaria, inspired by the 1683 Siege of Vienna by the Turks
- Alexander Glazunov – 5 Novelettes for String Quartet, Op 15
- Albert Ketèlbey – In a Persian Market (1920), In a Chinese Temple Garden (1925), and In the Mystic Land of Egypt (1931)
- Wolfgang Amadeus Mozart – Rondo alla turca from Piano Sonata No. 11 (K.331)
- Sergei Rachmaninoff – Oriental Sketch (1917)
- Pyotr Ilyich Tchaikovsky - “Chinese Dance” and “Arabian Dance” from The Nutcracker

== Theatre ==
- Tobias Bamberg's magic stage act as "Okito" (Germany, 1893 – United States, 1908)
- Oscar Wilde's Salomé (1893, first performed in Paris 1896)
- Alexander's mentalism stage act (United States, c. 1890s–1910s)
- William Ellsworth Robinson's, magic stage act as "Chung Ling Soo" (United States, 1900–1918)
- Mary Zimmerman's "The White Snake", stage play" (United States, 2012–present)
- James Fenton's "The Orphan of Zhao", stage play" (United States & Great Britain, 2012–present)

== Photography ==
- Emile Bechard (active in Egypt 1869–1890) (1844-?)
- Henri Bechard (active in Egypt 1870 -1880)
- Henri Chouanard (1883-1936)
- Roger Fenton
- Francis Frith
- J. Andre Garrigues (?-?) (cs:J. André Garrigues)
- Rafael Garzón (1863-1923)
- Eric Milet (1870-1950)
- Louis Antonin Neurdein (1846-1914)
- Dmitri Ivanovich Yermakov(1846–1916)

== Pulp magazines ==
- Oriental Stories: (1930–32), retitled The Magic Carpet Magazine (1933–34)

== Films ==
- Intolerance (1916)
- Broken Blossoms (1919)
- The Sheik (1921)
- The Lives of a Bengal Lancer (1935)
- The Thief of Bagdad (1940)
- My Geisha (1962)
- Indiana Jones and the Temple of Doom (1984)
- Aladdin (1992)

== Comics ==
- The Adventures of Tintin (1929–1983)
- Carnets d'Orient by Jacques Ferrandez
- Habibi (2011)

== Television ==
- Arabian Knights (1968–1969)

== See also ==
- List of Orientalist artists
- Orientalism
