= 1921 in British music =

This is a summary of 1921 in music in the United Kingdom.

== Events ==
- January – Sir Charles Villiers Stanford gives a public lecture entitled "Some Recent Tendencies in Composition", criticising current musical trends.
- 5 March – Charles Villiers Stanford makes his last public appearance when he conducts his latest work, the cantata At the Abbey Gate. The Observer thinks it "quite appealing even though one feels it to be more facile than powerful."
- 14 June – First performance of the orchestral version of Vaughan Williams's The Lark Ascending conducted by Adrian Boult with Marie Hall as violin soloist in a concert at the Queen's Hall in London.
- June – Adrian Boult conducts an experimental Opera Intime week at the Aeolian Hall (London).
- date unknown
  - A new production of The Tempest at the Aldwych Theatre, directed by Viola Tree, adds new incidental music by Arthur Bliss to that by Thomas Arne and Arthur Sullivan.
  - The Savoy Havana Band is formed as a resident dance band at the Savoy Hotel, London, by American saxophonist Bert Ralton.

== Popular music ==
- "And Her Mother Came Too": words by Dion Titheradge, music by Ivor Novello
- "Dancing Time": words by George Grossmith, Jr., music by Jerome Kern
- "Shimmy With Me": words by P. G. Wodehouse, music by Jerome Kern, from the musical The Cabaret Girl

== Classical music: new works ==
- Kenneth J. Alford – The Mad Major
- Arnold Bax – Mater ora Filium
- Eric Coates – Moresque
- John Foulds – A World Requiem (1919–21; premiered 1923)
- Albert Ketèlbey
  - Bells Across the Meadows
  - In a Persian Market
- John Ireland – Two Pieces for Piano
- Cyril Rootham – Suite in three movements for flute and piano

== Opera ==
- Gustav Holst – Savitri

== Musical theatre ==
- 17 January – The League of Notions London revue opens at the Oxford Theatre.
- 5 October – The Golden Moth (Music: Ivor Novello) opens at the Adelphi Theatre, starring Bobbie Comber and Thorpe Bates.

== Publications ==
- Porte, J. F. Sir Edward Elgar. London: Kegan Paul, Trench, Turner & Co. Ltd.

== Births ==
- 5 February – Sir John Pritchard, conductor (died 1989)
- 2 March – Robert Simpson, musicologist and composer (died 1997)
- 21 March – Antony Hopkins, composer and music writer (died 2014)
- 8 April – Alfie Bass, actor (Tevye in West End production of Fiddler on the Roof) (died 1987)
- 23 May – Humphrey Lyttelton, English jazz musician (died 2008)
- 12 July – Hilary Corke, writer and composer (died 2001)
- 13 August – Mary Lee, Scottish singer
- 8 September – Sir Harry Secombe, singer and comedian (died 2001)
- 21 September – Jimmy Young, singer and radio broadcaster (died 2016)
- 2 October – Robert Bruce Montgomery, composer (died 1978)
- 21 October – Sir Malcolm Arnold, composer (died 2006)

== Deaths ==
- 8 February – George Formby Sr, singer and comedian, 45 (tuberculosis)
- 25 February – John Thomas of Llanwrtyd, composer, 81
- 14 March – Gustave Barnes, violinist, painter and sculptor, 43
- 29 November – Ivan Caryll, Belgian-born composer of operettas in English, 60

== See also ==
- 1921 in the United Kingdom
