= Say It with Music (song) =

"Say It with Music" is a popular song written by Irving Berlin. It was introduced in the Music Box Revue of 1921, where it was the de facto theme song and sung as a duet. The song was popularised by Paul Whiteman and His Orchestra on 30 August 1921; this recording debuted on the charts on 12 November of that year, remained there for 14 weeks and peaked at number 1. Other popular versions in 1921/22 were by John Steel and by Ben Selvin.

== Popular culture ==
- "Say It with Music" became the theme song of all subsequent Music Box Revues. * *Ethel Merman sang it in the 1938 film Alexander's Ragtime Band.

== Other versions ==
Other artists who have recorded versions of the song include:

Ray Conniff - title song for his 1960 album, Say it With Music

- Jack Payne, who made it his signature tune,
- Pat Boone (1957)
- Dick Haymes (with Carmen Cavallaro in 1947 for Decca No. 24420).
