= The Clock and the Dresden Figures =

Light music piece for piano and orchestra by Albert Ketèlby

- Light music by Albert Ketèlbey
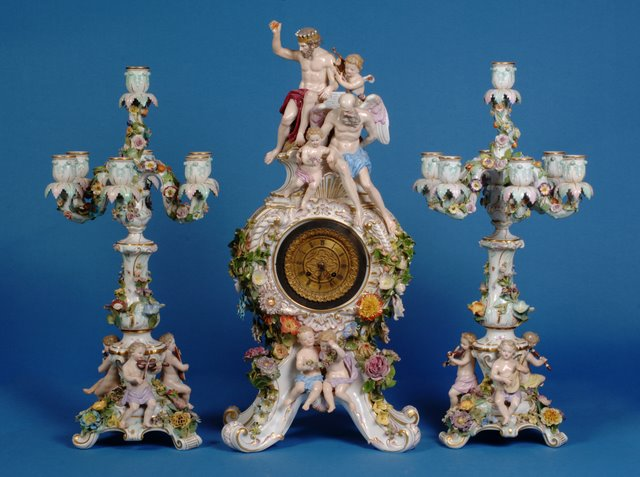
- Dresden china clock
- Composed: 1930
- Performed: February 8, 1930
- Published: 1930
- Scoring: piano (or xylophone); orchestra

The Clock and the Dresden Figures is a piece of light classical music for piano with orchestra (or military band) by Albert Ketèlbey. It was composed, first performed and published in 1930.

== History ==
The Clock and the Dresden Figures was premiered on 8 February 1930, using manuscript parts. The first recording was made on 27 February, resulting in a simultaneous issue of the recording and the sheet music, which was published by Bosworth. A version for xylophone replacing the piano was published later.

== Theme and music ==
A synopsis by the composer mentions that two Dresden china figures, which stand right and lift of a clock come to life. They dance, with the ticking clock providing the beat. When the Clock goes wrong, its spring breaks, and the figures return to their first positions.

In 1930, it was recorded, with the composer as the pianist, who took a fast tempo. It was reissued in 2002 in a collection of his light music.
