= The Day of the Funeral - Scene from Morocco =

1889 painting by Jean-Joseph Benjamin-Constant

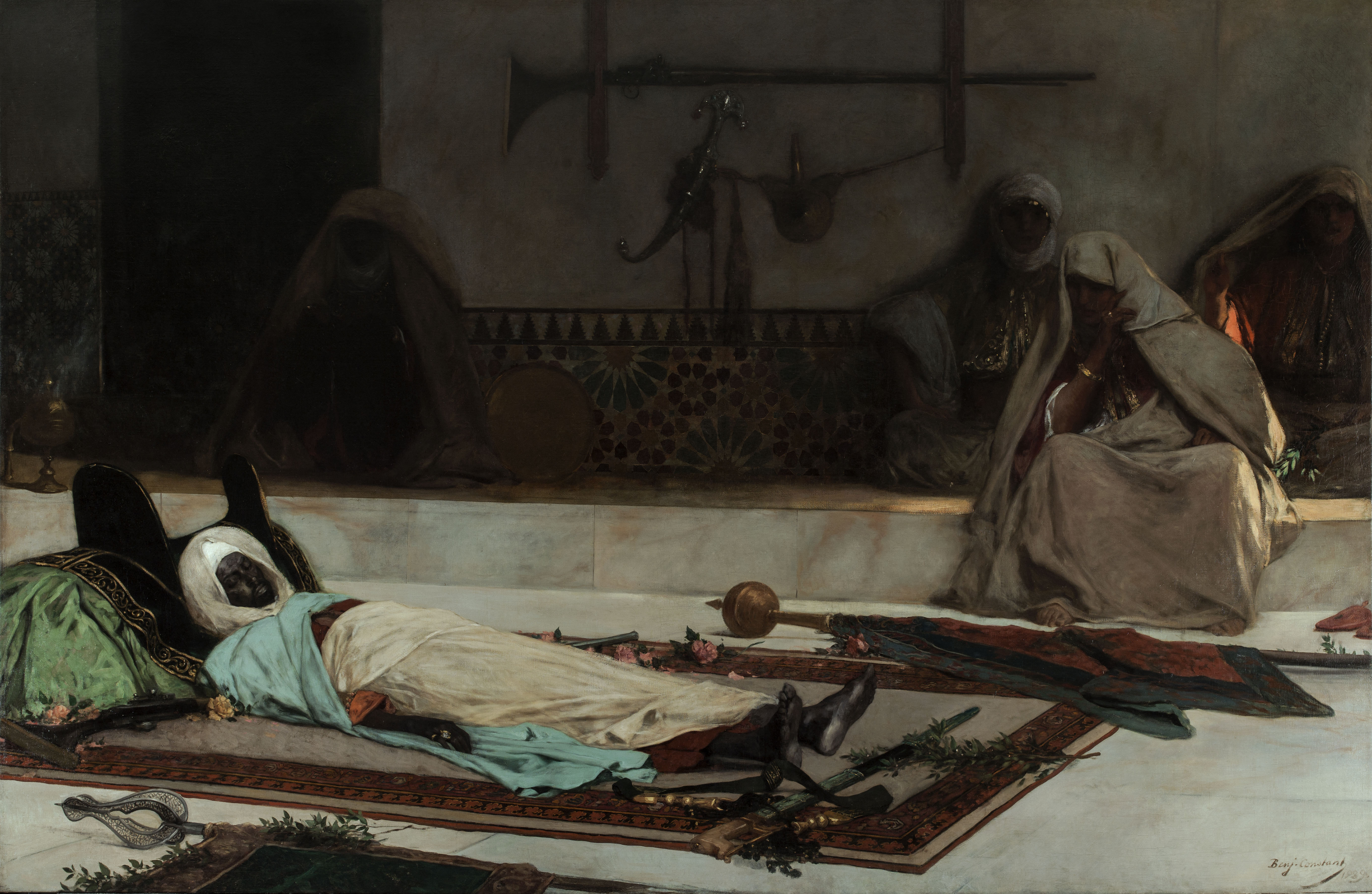
- Artist: Jean-Joseph Benjamin-Constant
- Year: 1889
- Type: Oil on canvas
- Dimensions: 278 cm × 428 cm (109 in × 169 in)
- Location: Petit Palais, Paris

The Day of the Funeral - Scene from Morocco or The Funeral of the Emir (French: Le jour des funérailles - Scène du Maroc, also known as Les funérailles de l'Emir) is an oil on canvas painting by Jean-Joseph Benjamin-Constant, from 1889. It was created more than twenty years after the painter's stay in Fez. It is held in the Petit Palais, in Paris.

== Subject ==
The canvas is a large orientalist work, 278cm high and 428cm wide. The subject is the interior of a Moroccan house on the day of a wake. In the foreground is the body of the dead man, with a standard in either side of him, lying on a decorated carpet strewn with roses and olive branches. His head rests on a saddle and his body is wrapped in a white burnous and a pale blue cloak. Behind him, sitting on a long marble step, are four women, watching over his body. A light from the right illuminates the three sitting near his feet with the warm hues of the setting sun. On the left, hidden in the shadows, a fourth woman sits, barely visible, near a smoking incense-burner. The walls of the room are decorated with tiles inspired by the Alhambra.

== History ==
The painting was the last of Benjamin-Constant’s orientalist compositions. It was not bought at the Salon, and won no prizes. Some time after 1889 the artist modified it by replacing the window in the background with a black veil.

The painting was donated by the artist’s widow Catherine-Jeanne Constant in 1905 and is in the collection of the Petit Palais in Paris. At the time of its accession to the museum it was known as La Mort de l’Emir (The Death of the Emir). The painting has been shown at a number of exhibitions, including:

- 2015 Benjamin Constant et l'Orientalisme sous la IIIe République, Montreal Museum of Fine Arts
- 2014-15 Benjamin Constant et l'Orientalisme sous la IIIe République, Musée des Augustins, Toulouse
- 1930 Centenaire de la conquête de l’Algérie (1830-1930) Petit Palais

There is an intaglio print version, also known as La Mort de l’Emir, by fr: Jean Antonin Delzers (1907).

== See also ==
- List of artistic works with Orientalist influences
