= Your Hundred Best Tunes =

Radio programme

- 1975 album of music from the show selected by Alan Keith (pictured)
- Genre: Music
- Running time: 60 minutes (9:00 pm – 10:00 pm)
- Country of origin: United Kingdom
- Language: English
- Home station: BBC Light Programme; BBC Home Service; BBC Radio 4 (1967–1970); BBC Radio 2 (1970–2007)
- Hosted by: Alan Keith (1959–2003); Richard Baker (2003–2007); Alfie Boe (2011 special)
- Created by: Alan Keith
- Original release: 15 November 1959 – 21 January 2007
- No. of episodes: approximately 2500

Your Hundred Best Tunes is a BBC radio music programme, always broadcast on Sunday evenings, which presented popular works which were mostly classical excerpts, choral works, opera and ballads. The hundred tunes which made up the playlist were initially selected by the creator and presenter, Alan Keith. Subsequently, tunes were suggested by requests and polls of listeners.

== History ==
The Hundred Best Tunes in the World was broadcast on the BBC Light Programme from 15 November 1959 until 7 February 1960, when Alan Keith's personal list of one hundred had all been played. The title was changed from 14 February 1960. At this point it ran for half an hour from 10 to 10.30 pm, but from 25 December 1960 it was extended and moved to earlier in the evening, running from 7.35 to 8.30 pm. From 12 March 1961 it adopted the 9 to 10 pm time slot which it would occupy for the rest of its life, on four different networks: it moved from the Light Programme to the Home Service from 5 January 1964, and remained there after it became Radio 4 from 1 October 1967, but returned to what had been the Light Programme, now renamed Radio 2, from 5 April 1970.

The last show was transmitted on 21 January 2007 – a run of over 47 years. For most of this time, it was presented by the original creator, Alan Keith, who continued up to the age of 94. After his death in 2003, Richard Baker presented the show. Holiday guest presenters included Evelyn Barbirolli, Rosalind Runcie, Earl Spencer and Ursula Vaughan Williams.

The show was cancelled by Lesley Douglas, Controller of Radio 2, who replaced it with a longer Melodies for You, presented by Alan Titchmarsh, which continued to play music from the same repertoire until it too was cancelled in 2011. A special edition of the format was aired on 30 December 2011, presented by Alfie Boe, who played a selection from the 2003 poll plus some of his own favourites.

== The hundred best tunes ==
Polls were taken to confirm the choice of the hundred best tunes. The results of the last poll in 2003 are below. The previous poll was in 1997 and the position of each work in that earlier poll is shown in the right hand column.

Number	Piece	Composer	Previous
1	"Au fond du temple saint" from The Pearl Fishers	Georges Bizet	1
2	"Nimrod" from Enigma Variations	Edward Elgar	16
3	"Va, pensiero" from Nabucco	Giuseppe Verdi	22
4	Violin Concerto No. 1 in G Minor	Max Bruch	12
5	Canon in D	Johann Pachelbel	52
6	Clarinet Concerto in A	Wolfgang Amadeus Mozart	33
7	Symphony No. 6 in F (Pastoral)	Ludwig van Beethoven	27
8	Piano Concerto No. 2 in C Minor	Sergei Rachmaninoff	8
9	"Intermezzo" from Cavalleria rusticana	Pietro Mascagni	23
10	The Lark Ascending	Ralph Vaughan Williams	–
11	Finlandia	Jean Sibelius	2
12	Symphony No. 9 in D Minor 'Choral'	Ludwig van Beethoven	5
13	The Planets	Gustav Holst	9
14	"Ombra mai fu" from Serse	George Frideric Handel	17
15	Piano Concerto No. 21 in C	Wolfgang Amadeus Mozart	25
16	Adagio for Strings	Samuel Barber	14
17	Piano Concerto No. 5 in E Flat 'Emperor'	Ludwig van Beethoven	24
18	"Méditation" from Thaïs	Jules Massenet	39
19	Symphony No. 9 in E Minor From the New World	Antonín Dvořák	36
20	Fantasia on a Theme by Thomas Tallis	Ralph Vaughan Williams	-
21	Ave Verum Corpus	Wolfgang Amadeus Mozart	28
22	Miserere mei, Deus – Psalm 51	Gregorio Allegri	–
23	"Hallelujah!" from Messiah	George Frideric Handel	32
24	"Laudate Dominum" from Solemn Vespers	Wolfgang Amadeus Mozart	-
25	"Romance" from The Gadfly Suite	Dmitri Shostakovich	29
26	Zadok the Priest, one of the Coronation Anthems	George Frideric Handel	68
27	"The Arrival of the Queen of Sheba" from Solomon	George Frideric Handel	38
28	Piano Concerto in A minor	Edvard Grieg	–
29	"Jesu, Joy of Man's Desiring"	Johann Sebastian Bach	85
30	Cello Concerto in E Minor	Edward Elgar	6
31	"What is Life?" from Orfeo ed Euridice	Christoph Willibald Gluck performed by Kathleen Ferrier	30
33	"Baïlèro" from Songs of the Auvergne	Joseph Canteloube	18
33	The Blue Danube	Johann Strauss II	
34	"Listen to the Mocking Bird"	Septimus Winner (as Alice Hawthorne)	42
35	"Song to the Moon" from Rusalka	Antonín Dvořák	4
36	"Bells Across the Meadows"	Albert Ketèlbey	–
37	Symphony No. 3 (Organ)	Camille Saint-Saëns	–
38	Pomp and Circumstance No. 1	Edward Elgar	31
39	Violin Concerto in E Minor	Felix Mendelssohn	40
40	"Che gelida manina" from La bohème	Giacomo Puccini	89
41	The Four Seasons	Antonio Vivaldi	–
42	Symphony No. 5	Ludwig van Beethoven	–
43	"Panis angelicus"	César Franck	13
44	"I Dreamt I Dwelt in Marble Halls" from The Bohemian Girl	Michael William Balfe	–
45	Piano Concerto No. 1	Pyotr Ilyich Tchaikovsky	–
46	"Grand March" from Aida	Giuseppe Verdi	26
47	"A Londonderry Air" - this was the theme tune – traditional, arranged	Percy Grainger	59
48	The Merry Widow	Franz Lehár	67
49	"Nessun dorma" from Turandot	Giacomo Puccini	51
50	Cantique de Jean Racine	Gabriel Fauré	–
51	"In Paradisum" from Requiem	Gabriel Fauré	–
52	Symphony No. 7	Ludwig van Beethoven	–
53	Toccata and Fugue in D minor	Johann Sebastian Bach	–
54	Adagio in G minor	Tomaso Albinoni	–
55	"Judex" from Mors et vita	Charles Gounod	–
56	Rhapsody on a Theme of Paganini	Sergei Rachmaninoff	–
57	Warsaw Concerto	Richard Addinsell	–
58	"Adagio" from Spartacus	Aram Khachaturian	–
59	Romeo and Juliet	Pyotr Ilyich Tchaikovsky	–
60	"Don't Be Cross" from The Mine Foreman (Der Obersteiger)	Carl Zeller	79
61	"Sanctus" from German Mass (Deutsche Messe)	Franz Schubert	20
62	"I know that my Redeemer liveth" from Messiah	George Frideric Handel	10
63	"Love Duet" from Madama Butterfly	Giacomo Puccini	15
65	Fantasia on "Greensleeves"	Ralph Vaughan Williams	–
65	Symphony No. 2	Sergei Rachmaninoff	–
66	Fingal's Cave	Felix Mendelssohn	–
67	"Polovetsian Dances" from Prince Igor	Alexander Borodin	–
68	The Yeomen of the Guard	Gilbert and Sullivan	–
69	Schindler's List Theme	John Williams	–
70	Symphony No. 5 (Adagietto)	Gustav Mahler	–
71	"Sanctus" from St. Cecilia Mass	Charles Gounod	–
72	Scheherezade	Nikolai Rimsky-Korsakov	–
73	"Old Comrades" ("Alte Kameraden")	Carl Teike	11
74	The Marriage of Figaro	Wolfgang Amadeus Mozart	–
75	"Nuns' Chorus" from Casanova	Ralph Benatzky (based on Johann Strauss II)	7
76	1812 Overture	Pyotr Ilyich Tchaikovsky	–
77	"Jerusalem"	Hubert Parry	58
78	"Morning Mood" from Peer Gynt Suites	Edvard Grieg	47
79	Concierto de Aranjuez	Joaquín Rodrigo	–
80	"Dance of the Blessed Spirits" from Orfeo ed Euridice	Christoph Willibald Gluck	–
81	"Casta diva" from Norma	Vincenzo Bellini	–
82	The Nutcracker Suite	Pyotr Ilyich Tchaikovsky	–
83	"Softly Awakes My Heart" from Samson and Delilah	Camille Saint-Saëns	49
84	Eine kleine Nachtmusik	Wolfgang Amadeus Mozart	–
85	"Ave Maria"	Franz Schubert	43
86	"O mio babbino caro" from Gianni Schicchi	Giacomo Puccini	–
87	Moonlight Sonata	Ludwig van Beethoven	–
88	"Sheep May Safely Graze"	Johann Sebastian Bach	–
89	"Where Corals Lie" from Sea Pictures	Edward Elgar	-
90	Concerto for Two Violins in D minor	Johann Sebastian Bach	–
91	Clair de lune	Claude Debussy	–
92	The Creation	Joseph Haydn	77
93	Crown Imperial	William Walton	–
94	"On the Road to Mandalay"	Oley Speaks	–
95	Romance No. 2 in F major	Ludwig van Beethoven	–
96	The Watermill	Ronald Binge	35
97	The Holy City	Frederic Weatherly and Stephen Adams	-
98	"Bredon Hill" from A Shropshire Lad	Graham Peel	–
99	William Tell Overture from William Tell	Gioachino Rossini	–
100	Hear My Prayer	Felix Mendelssohn	–

== Other media ==
Alan Keith published a book about the music played in the show in 1975. The Decca Record Company published a successful ten-volume series of records with the title The World of Your 100 Best Tunes. The BBC published a six-CD collection of the music selected by the final poll listed above.

== See also ==
- Classic FM Hall of Fame
