= In the Mystic Land of Egypt =

Piece of light classical music by Albert Ketèlbey

- Light music by Albert Ketèlbey
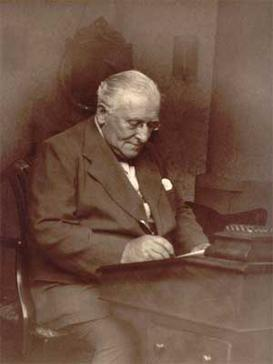
- Albert Ketèlbey
- Key: D minor
- Composed: 1931
- Published: 1931
- Scoring: orchestra

In the Mystic Land of Egypt is a piece of light classical music for orchestra and optional voices composed by Albert Ketèlbey in 1931. The piece was published by Bosworth the same year, also in versions with piano.

== History ==
Ketèlbey composed the piece after the successful model of In a Persian Market of 1920. Both work begin with march music followed by a romantic melody, and include singing. In the Mystic Land of Egypt was published by Bosworth in 1931, in versions for orchestra and for piano.

== Theme and music ==
The piece in D minor and 2/4 time is marked Con moto (quasi marcia). A synopsis of scenes by the composer mentions that first native soldiers pass through a village, followed by a soft song from a boat on the Nile. An Arab plays on a pipe, then the song is repeated by the orchestra, finally also by the returning soldiers.

The composer scored the work for a tenor or high baritone to perform the song, a male choir (or quartet) of soldiers, and a "colourful" orchestra including saxophones, banjos, mandolins, and marimba. In performance, the voices are often replaced by instruments.

A motif of a descending chromatic scale is introduced in the beginning, repeated throughout the piece in both the melody as the harmony, in the end inverted. The unifying element has been called "an attractive musical device, though hardly Egyptian".

== Selected recordings ==
A historic recording of the work, conducted by the composer, was reissued in 2002 in a collection of his light music. In 2008, it was included in a collection of Golden Age of Light Music: Globetrotting, with several works by English and American composers of "exotic, mostly tropical settings the listener becomes the beneficiary of a riot of imagination".
