= By the Blue Hawaiian Waters =

Piece of light classical music by Albert Ketèlbey

- Light music by Albert Ketèlbey
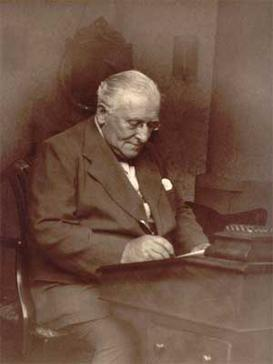
- Albert Ketèlbey
- Key: C major
- Published: 1927
- Scoring: orchestra

By the Blue Hawaiian Waters is a piece of light classical music for orchestra by Albert Ketèlbey. He composed the "tone-picture" in 1927. The piece was published by Bosworth the same year.

== History ==
Some of the music of By the Blue Hawaiian Waters had been incidental music in a play Ye Gods in 1916. Ketèlbey wrote the "tone-picture" in 1927. It was probably first performed in Harrogate the same year, and published that year, also in versions with piano.

== Theme and music ==
A synopsis of scenes by the composer mentions that after a short introduction and a vigorous hula dance, a lover plays his "native love-call", followed by the "Song of the Hula Girl". The work is concluded by a lively dance at a betrothal ceremony.

The piece in C major and common time is marked Allegretto dolce (with flowing movement). The melody of the love-call is played by the clarinet.

In 1929, it was recorded, conducted by the composer. He made only minor cuts, and added a Hawaiian guitar, played by Len Fellis, "a star of many a dance band". Ketèlbey replaced the clarinet by an alto saxophone for the love-call, making it "one of the earliest recordings of a standard orchestra to include a saxophone". It was reissued in 2002 in a collection of his light music. A review notes that the work "treads a dangerous and ultimately unsuccessfully schizophrenic path between the hula and urbane romanticism."

A recording with Frieder Weissmann conducting the Berliner Symphoniker, possibly in March 1931, also used the saxophone and Hawaiian guitar, but additionally gong, xylophone and a men's chorus singing without words, because it was coupled with In a Chinese Temple Garden which requires the larger ensemble.
