= In a Chinese Temple Garden =

Piece of light classical music by Albert Ketèlbey

- Light music by Albert Ketèlbey
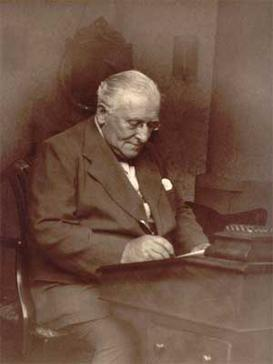
- Albert Ketèlbey
- Key: E minor
- Published: 1923
- Scoring: orchestra

In a Chinese Temple Garden is a piece of light classical music for orchestra by Albert Ketèlbey who composed it in 1923. Subtitled an Oriental Phantasy, it illustrates a priestly incantation, two lovers, a wedding procession, a street brawl and the restoration of calm by the beating of the temple gong.

== Theme and music ==
The piece in E minor and common time is marked Andante moderato. A synopsis of scenes by the composer mentions that after a short introduction, "The Incantation of the Priests in the Temple" is followed by "The Perfume of Incence Floats on the Air". Two lovers are illustrated by a melody for cello, viola and oboe accompanied by pizzicato, followed by a noisy Manchu wedding procession. An argument of coolies is based on a Chinese scale. The temple gong restores quietness, and the piece ends recalling many of the themes.

== Publishing and reception ==
In a Chinese Temple Garden was published by Bosworth Music in 1923, in versions for orchestra, piano, two pianos, and violin and piano. The critic Ronald Ever wrote in 1958 about Ketèlbey's use of "every exotic noisemaker known to man—chimes, orchestra bells, gongs (all sizes and nationalities), cymbals, woodblocks, xylophone, drums of every variety". He noted: "Oriental music is Ketèlbey music: the clashing cymbals; the little pinging bells; the minor modes; the amazingly graphic mincing step created by rapidly reiterated notes; the coy taps on the woodblock."

A historic recording of the work, conducted by the composer, was reissued in 2002 in a collection of his light music. The piece was recorded in 1992 by the London Promenade Orchestra, conducted by Alexander Faris, together with other works by the composer including In a Persian Market.
