= The Heart's Awakening =

1907 song by Albert Ketèlbey

- Song by Albert Ketèlbey
- Published: 1907

The Heart's Awakening is a song by Albert Ketèlbey, composed in 1907. It was published the same year by Novello.

The Heart's Awakening became the title of a collection of the composer's songs and piano music, recorded by tenor Peter Dempsey and pianist Guy Rowland.
