= Doris Ketelbey =

Caroline Doris Ketelbey FRHistS (1896–1990) was a historian and lecturer at the University of St Andrews. She was the first woman historian to hold a long-term position at the university.

== Early life and childhood ==
Doris Ketelbey was the youngest of five surviving children born to George Henry Ketelbey, a jewellery engraver, and his wife Sarah Ann, née Aston. Her elder brother, Albert William Ketelbey, was a composer, conductor, and pianist, best known for his short pieces of light orchestral music. Her brother Harold was also a celebrated British violinist. Her nephew-in-law was the English classical pianist Sir Clifford Curzon.

== Education ==
Ketelbey attended King Edward VI Grammar School and she gained a master's degree in 1914 at the University of Birmingham. She was awarded a research scholarships by her university in 1917. Her MA thesis was a comparative study of federation in the United States since the declaration of independence, in Switzerland since the thirteenth century and in Germany since 1866, with reference to federation in the British Empire.

In 1918 Ketelbey attended Somerville College, Oxford University.

== Early career and authorship ==
Ketelbey worked at St Leonard's School in St Andrews until 1927. In the mid-1920s, she began publishing in Harrap’s ‘Readings from Great Historians’ series. She compiled two volumes on European history: one in 1924 from ‘the fall of Rome to the eve of the French Revolution’ and in 1926 from ‘the eve of the French revolution to the eve of the Great War’. Her intention in these books was to introduce 'certain historical authors whose reputation were somewhat dimmed by the present convention'.

After leaving St. Leonard's she began work on A History of Modern Times: from 1789 to the Present Day, which was published by Harrap in 1929. It would go on to become a textbook for schools and at some universities. It was reprinted multiple times in at least five editions as late as the 1970s. In the preface to the book, she indicates that her areas of special study were the chief movements of the Age of Democracy and the factors which produced them.

Between 1930 and 1931 Ketelbey worked for press baron Lord Beaverbrook. Between 1931 and 1932 she gained her first appointment in a university as a temporary assistant to James Eadie Todd, professor of modern history at Queen's University Belfast.

== University of St Andrews ==
In 1934, Ketelbey returned to St Andrews to a role as Assistant Lecturer in the department of Modern History.

In the late 1930s, she gave talks on women's position in Nazi Germany, discussing the similarities and growing divergence in fascist Germany and Italy's approach to women. By this time she was also a Fellow of the Royal Historical Society. She also worked with the BBC teaching Scottish History to school children via the radio in 1938. In 1944, Ketelbey lectured RAF personnel on History through the Air Ministry Training Scheme offered by the university. She also contributed a pamphlet on The Growth of the British Empire to a series commissioned to educate members of H.M. forces.

In December 1942, Ketelbey petitioned the University Court for promotion to Lecturer ‘on account of her long service with the ‘approval and consent’ of Professor Williams, however, this request was denied. In 1945, after 11 years at the university, Ketelbey was finally promoted to Lecturer. In 1946, she was appointed as assistant advisor of studies and was appointed to the council of the Scottish History Association. In the same year, she contributed to a pamphlet on the teaching of history in Scottish junior secondary schools. In 1948, she became one of the Preliminary Examiners in History. She had also been appointed to the council of the Scottish History Association in 1946.

In 1950, Ketelbey accepted a temporary appointment as visiting professor at the University College of the Gold Coast to organise the Department of History. She worked there for 6 months and played an important role in the development of the curriculum.

In June 1951, Ketelbey again requested the university court consider her for a promotion but was refused. Finally, in 1955, she was promoted to Senior Lecturer at the university.

== Retirement and later life ==
Ketelbey retired from her position at the university in 1958. She continued to live in St Andrews until her death. In the 1970s, she set out to record her own family history, compiling two volumes on the Ketelbeys between 1975 and 1982.

She died in December 1990 and is buried in St Andrews’ Western Cemetery.

In 1991, the university's Alumnus Chronicle mislabeled Ketelbey as 'lecturer', rather as 'senior lecturer' which she had fought so hard for, so women appointed lectureships in the early 2000s believed they were the first women in Modern History at St Andrews.

== Selected publications ==
- Readings from the Great Historians: European History from the Fall of Rome to the Eve of the French Revolution (1924)
- European History From The Eve Of The French Revolution To The Eve Of The Great War (1926)
- A History of Modern Times: from 1789 to the Present Day (1929)
- History Stories to Tell (1931)
- A Short History of Modern Europe from 1789 (1945)
- Charles Dickens 1812–1870: A Biography, with examples of the work of his finest illustrators – John Greaves, C.D.M. Ketelbey, Sam Kyd (1962)
- Tullis Russell 1809–1959 (1967)
- In Search of Ketelbeys (unpublished, compiled between 1975 and 1982)
