= Margaret Ross Griffel =

American musicologist and author (born 1943)

- Born: 9 July 1943 (age 83); New York, New York
- Education: Barnard College; Boston University; Columbia University
- Occupation: Musicologist
- Writing career
- Notable works: Operas in German: A Dictionary; Operas in English: A Dictionary

Margaret Ross Griffel (born 9 July 1943) is an American musicologist and author.

== Biography ==
Griffel graduated from High School of Music & Art, in Manhattan, New York in 1961. She earned a B.A. from Barnard College in 1965, M.A. in European and American History from Boston University in 1966, and a Ph.D. in musicology from Columbia University in 1975. She has served as the senior editor at Columbia University's Office of Publications and has done editorial work for various publishers. Her January 2018 revised edition of Operas in German: A Dictionary contains more than 4,500 entries and her December 2012 revised edition of Operas in English: A Dictionary contains 4,400.

== Awards ==
The December 2012 revised edition of Operas in English: A Dictionary received the "Booklist Editor's Choice Award" in 2013 and the "Library Journal Best Reference" in 2012.

== Works ==
- Operas in German: A Dictionary, published in 1990, ISBN 9781442247963 (paper), ISBN 9781442247970 (ebook); revised 2018
- Operas in English: A Dictionary, published in 2013, ISBN 978-0-8108-8272-0 (print), ISBN 978-0-8108-8325-3 (ebook)
