= Jonathan Bellman =

American musicologist

Jonathan Bellman (born 1957) is a musicologist and pianist currently employed at the University of Northern Colorado. He is noted for his research on exoticism and music.

Bellman is the author of The ‘Style hongrois’ in the Music of Western Europe (Boston: Northeastern University Press, 1993, ISBN 1-55553-169-5) and of Chopin’s Polish Ballade: Op. 38 as Narrative of National Martyrdom (Oxford: Oxford University Press, 2009, ISBN 978-0-19-533886-7 ). He was editor of The Exotic in Western Music (Northeastern University Press, 1997, ISBN 1-55553-319-1), a collection of essays. His contributions to that volume, "Hungarian Gypsies and the poetics of exclusion" and "Indian resonances in the British Invasion, 1965-1968," are cited in musicological literature.

He has written numerous articles on topics related to music and exoticism in books such as Performing Brahms: Early Evidence of Performance Style (Cambridge University Press, 2003) and in major musicological periodicals such as the Journal of the American Musicological Society, Musical Quarterly, Journal of Musicological Research, Journal of Musicology, Early Music, and 19th-Century Music. His articles and books have received citations in indicator-databases such as Grove Music Online, Music Index, and RILM.

His book A Short Guide to Writing About Music (New York: Pearson Longman, 2000, 2nd edn 2007, ISBN 0-321-18791-1) is a style guide used in the field of music history pedagogy.

He currently participates in the musicology blog "Dial 'M' for Musicology."

As a pianist, in 2009, he premiered (with Lei Weng and Kiyoshi Tamagawa) a reconstruction of a piece jointly composed by Felix Mendelssohn and Ignaz Moscheles, the "Fantasy and Variations for Two Pianos and Orchestra on the Gypsy March from Carl Maria von Weber’s Preziosa."

== See also ==
- New musicology
