= Henry Behr =

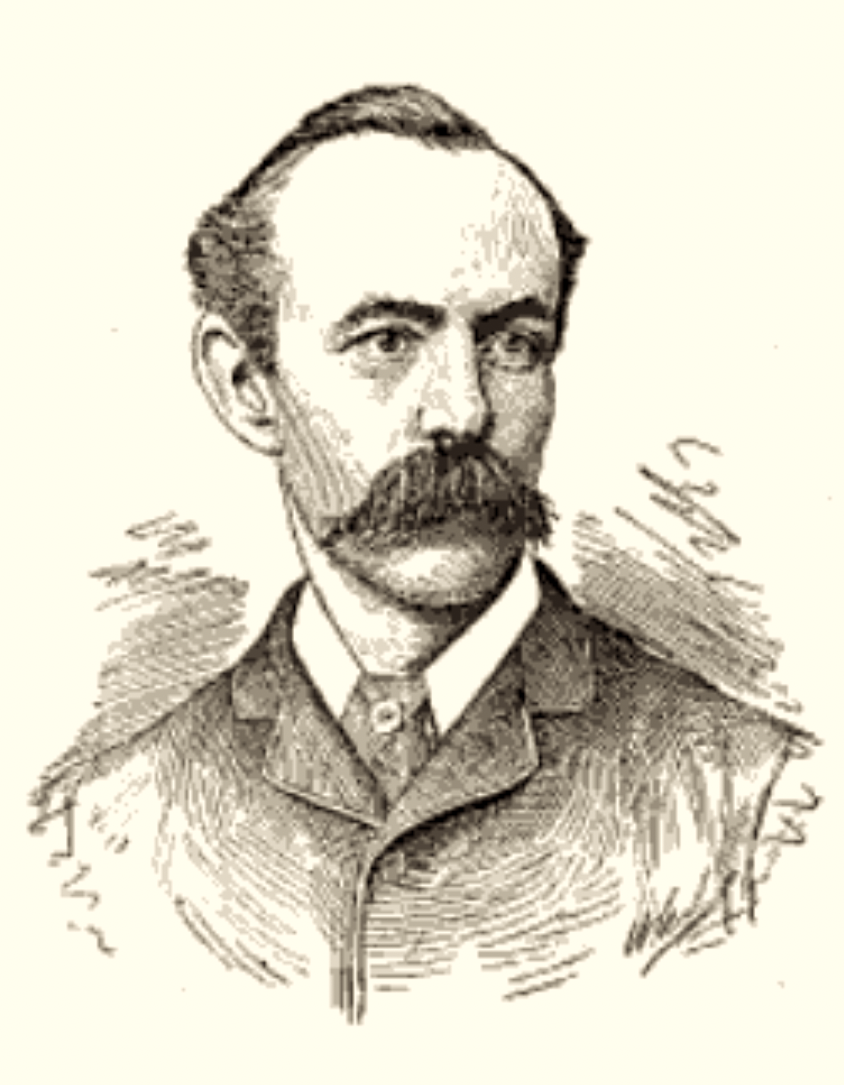
Henry Behr

Henry Behr (22 September 1848 – 30 November 1921) was a German-born American piano manufacturer who was the founder of Behr Brothers & Co.

== Early life, education, and war service ==
Henry Behr was born on 22 September 1848 in Hamburg, Germany. His father operated a hardware business in Germany and also exported goods to the United States. Henry immigrated with his family to America at a young age; settling in New York City in 1849 while just a year old. He was educated in New York City Public Schools until the age of 12 when he dropped out of school to help his father in his struggling business as a manufacturer of skates.

Behr was a soldier in the Union army during the American Civil War. He enlisted as a private in the 169th New York Infantry Regiment in 1864, and for a year served under General Alfred Terry's command in the Army of the Potomac. He fought in five major battles during this time and was one of the few survivors in his unit of a large magazine explosion at the Second Battle of Fort Fisher. The explosion occurred on January 16, 1865 and killed a minimum of 200 men with victims on both sides of the conflict. Wounded, he was sent to the hospital on Davids Island for care, and was ultimately honorably discharged for military service.

== Career and later life ==
After the Civil War ended in 1865, Behr made a living as a salesman of both glue and varnish. Several of his clients were piano makers which is how he first came into contact with the piano manufacturing trade. In 1875 he took up the making of piano cases; assuming that trade after one of his clients went bankrupt and he bought his business when it went into receivership. His initial partner in this new venture was Leopold Peck, and advertisements for the piano case manufacturing firm of Behr & Peck were published as early as 1876. Sources disagree as to how long this partnership lasted with one source reporting that Peck left the organization as early as 1876, and another in the year 1879. However, The Musical and Sewing Machine Gazette reported in its February 14, 1880 issue that the firm dissolved after a strike by its workers in January 1880.

Immediately after the demise of Behr & Peck, a new firm was established by Henry Behr with his younger brother, Edward Behr. It was originally called H. Behr & Brother when it was founded in 1880. It became Behr Brothers and Company in 1881 when piano maker Paul G. Mehlin joined the firm. It was later officially changed to Behr, Brother & Company in 1884, but was more often referred to as Behr Brothers. Mehlin left the company in 1886 at which time Siegfried Hansing became the company's technical director as well as overseeing the management of the company's factory. Hansing remained in that post through 1892. The quality of the company's pianos was on the higher end. Concert pianist Xaver Scharwenka used a Behr Brothers piano when he performed as a soloist with the New York Philharmonic in 1901, and also used on their pianos while touring the United States.

He resided for many year in Montclair, New Jersey. He had three daughters with his wife, Catherine Margaret Behr. Their son William J. Bere (born January 5, 1872, Brooklyn) followed in his father's path and became a partner in the Behr piano company in 1899; ultimately taking over the management of the factory in 1902 and heading the company's sales department.

Behr died on 30 November 1921 at the home of his daughter in Pasadena, California. His wife Catherine preceded him in death on January 4, 1914.
