= Albert Ketèlbey =

English composer and pianist (1875–1959)

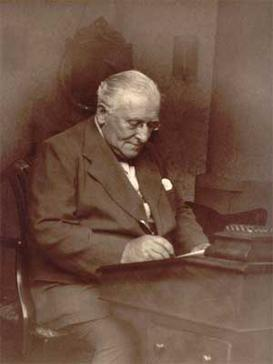
- Born: Albert William Ketelbey; 9 August 1875; Aston, Birmingham, England
- Died: 26 November 1959 (aged 84); Cowes, Isle of Wight, England
- Occupations: Composer; Conductor; Pianist

Albert William Ketèlbey (/kəˈtɛlbi/; born Ketelbey; 9 August 1875 – 26 November 1959) was an English composer, conductor and pianist, best known for his short pieces of light orchestral music. He was born in Birmingham and moved to London in 1889 to study at Trinity College of Music. After a brilliant studentship he did not pursue the classical career predicted for him, becoming musical director of the Vaudeville Theatre before gaining fame as a composer of light music and as a conductor of his own works.

For many years Ketèlbey worked for a series of music publishers, including Chappell & Co and the Columbia Graphophone Company, making arrangements for smaller orchestras, a period in which he learned to write fluent and popular music. He also found great success writing music for silent films until the advent of talking films in the late 1920s.

The composer's early works in conventional classical style were well received, but it was for his light orchestral pieces that he became best known. One of his earliest works in the genre, In a Monastery Garden (1915), sold over a million copies and brought him to widespread notice; his later musical depictions of exotic scenes caught the public imagination and established his fortune. Such works as In a Persian Market (1920), In a Chinese Temple Garden (1923), and In the Mystic Land of Egypt (1931) became best-sellers in print and on records; by the late 1920s he was Britain's first millionaire composer. His celebrations of British scenes were equally popular: examples include Cockney Suite (1924) with its scenes of London life, and his ceremonial music for royal events. His works were frequently recorded during his heyday, and a substantial part of his output has been put on CD in more recent years.

Ketèlbey's popularity began to wane during the Second World War and his originality also declined; many of his post-war works were re-workings of older pieces and he increasingly found his music ignored by the BBC. In 1949 he moved to the Isle of Wight, where he spent his retirement, and he died at home in obscurity. His work has been reappraised since his death; in a 2003 poll by the BBC radio programme Your Hundred Best Tunes, Bells Across the Meadows was voted the 36th most popular tune of all time. On the last night of the 2009 Proms season the orchestra performed his In a Monastery Garden, marking the fiftieth anniversary of Ketèlbey's death—the first time his music had been included in the festival's finale.

== Biography ==
=== Early life and education, 1875–95 ===
Albert William Ketèlbey was born on 9 August 1875 at 41 Alma Street in the Aston area of Birmingham, England. (Note: Despite several sources claiming the composer's name was William Aston, Ketèlbey's biographer John Sant states that the original birth certificate is in the name Albert William Ketelbey.) He was the second of five children of George Henry, a jewellery engraver, and his wife Sarah Ann, née Aston. The grave accent was Albert's invention: the family name was spelled without it at the time of his birth and there had been several variants of the name in the previous generations. (Note: These variations included Kettelby, Kettelbey and Ketelby; George's birth certificate had the spelling Kettelbey, although his marriage certificate was in the name Ketelbey.) All the children were taught a musical instrument and Ketèlbey's brother, Harold, was later a violinist of note. Albert showed a natural talent for the piano and singing, and he subsequently became head chorister at St Silas' Church in nearby Lozells. His younger sister was the historian Doris Ketelbey.

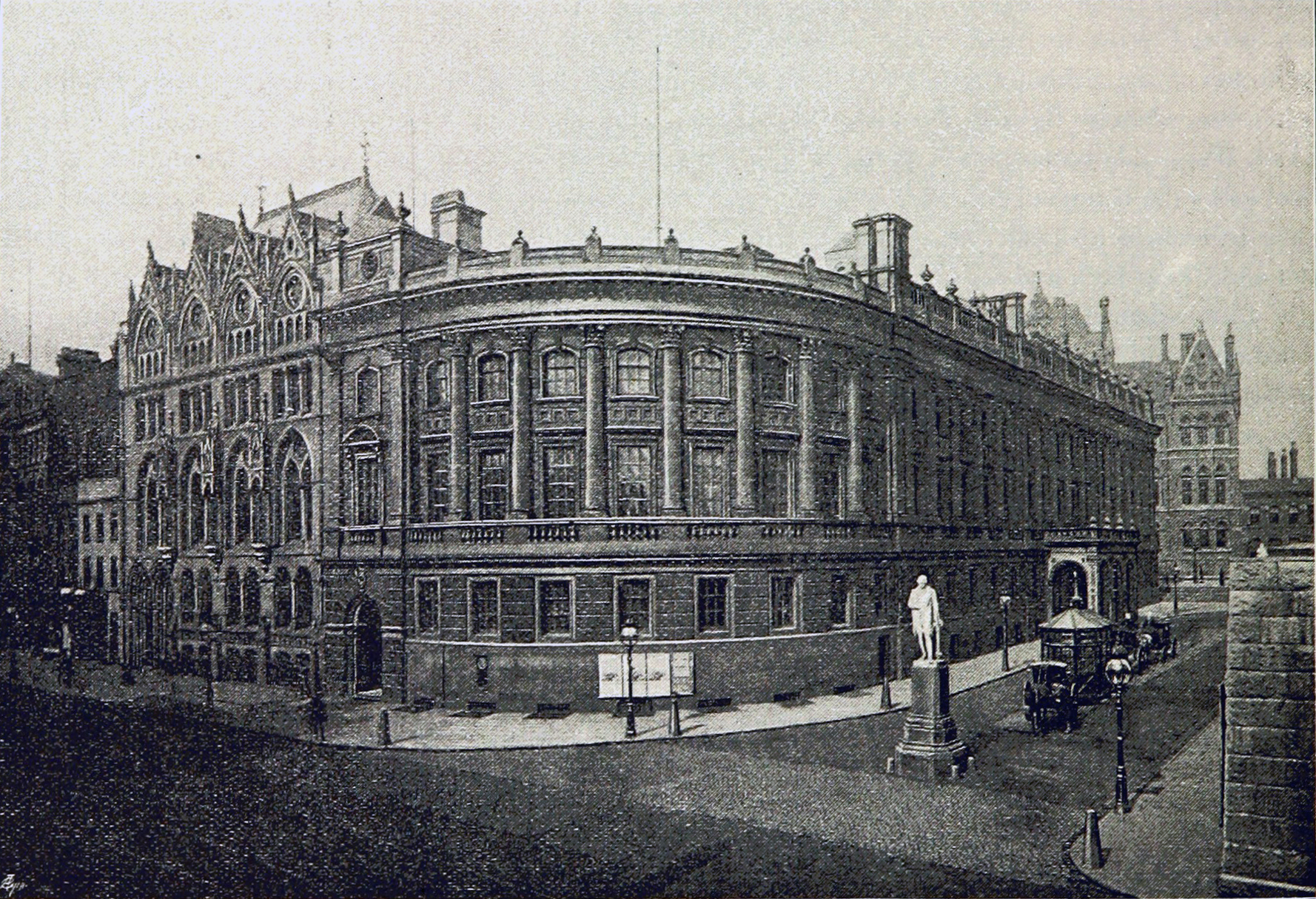
The Birmingham and Midland Institute (demolished) in Paradise Street, Birmingham

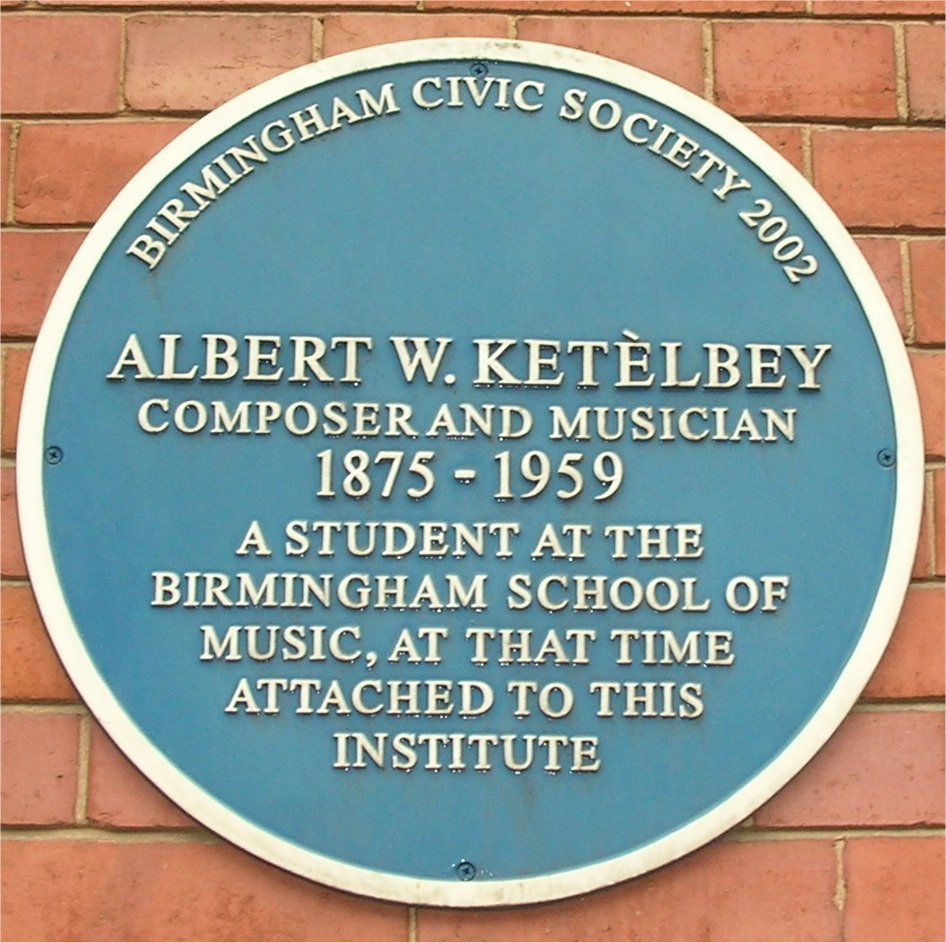
Blue plaque on the current institute building, commemorating Ketèlbey's time as a student of the school of music

At the age of eleven Ketèlbey joined the Birmingham and Midland Institute school of music (now the Royal Birmingham Conservatoire) where he was tutored by Dr Alfred Gaul in composition and Dr H. W. Wareing in harmony. At the age of thirteen Ketèlbey composed his first serious piece of music, "Sonata for Pianoforte", (Note: Tom McCanna, Ketèlbey's biographer, reports of rumours of an earlier piano sonata, written at the age of eleven, although this cannot be substantiated.) which, for Tom McCanna, his biographer, "shows a precocious mastery of composition". Ketèlbey competed for a scholarship to Trinity College of Music in London, and received the highest marks of all entrants; the future composer Gustav Holst came second. Ketèlbey entered the college in 1889, studying under G. E. Bambridge (piano), Dr G. Saunders (harmony) and Frederick Corder (composition).

In 1892 Ketèlbey again won the annual scholarship competition and was appointed as the organist at St John's Church, Wimbledon, London. He held the post for the next five years, during which time he wrote several anthems and hymns, the latter of which included "Every Good Gift", "Behold! Upon the Mountains" and "Be Strong! All ye People". It was around this time he added the accent to his surname, with the aim of moving the stress onto the second syllable, rather than the first. In that year he appeared in a series of concerts in London and provincial cities. In March 1892 at the capital's Queen's Hall he played Frédéric Chopin's Scherzo No. 2 in B-flat minor; the reviewer for The Illustrated London News thought the "brilliant" Ketèlbey played "most beautifully". He won several prizes at the college before being awarded his certificate in 1895. (Note: In 1890 he won the Turner Pianoforte Medal; in 1892 the college medals for Harmony and Counterpoint and the Gabriel Prize; and in 1895 the Sir Michael Costa Prize and the Tallis Gold Medal.) During this period, The British Musician reports, some critics found likenesses between Ketèlbey's music and that of Edward German.

Towards the end of his time at the college Ketèlbey wrote lighter, mostly mandolin-based, compositions. As he still aspired to be a serious composer, he adapted the pseudonym Raoul Clifford in an effort to distance himself from the genre. On leaving the college he became one of its examiners in harmony. (Note: In later years he also became one of the main board examiners for the college.) He wrote piano pieces as part of his role, and used the pseudonym Anton Vodorinski for the work; he subsequently used the name for more serious works, which he published with French titles. (Note: He also used several other pseudonyms when publishing work, including Geoffrey Kaye, Dennis Charlton, A. William Aston and Andre de Basque.)

=== Early career, 1896–1914 ===
In 1896 Ketèlbey took up the post of conductor for a travelling light opera company; his father, who wanted his son to be a composer of serious music, disapproved of what he saw as a lightweight role. After a two-year tour Ketèlbey was appointed as musical director of the Opera Comique Theatre—at age 22, the youngest theatrical conductor in London at the time. He moved into a house in Bruton Street, in London's Mayfair, where he wrote the song "Blow! Blow! Thou Winter Wind", to words from Shakespeare's As You Like It. The Opera Comique staged a successful revival of the musical Alice in Wonderland between December 1898 and March 1899, and according to his biographer John Sant, it is possible that Ketèlbey wrote some of the music. This was followed by the comic opera A Good Time from April, for which Ketèlbey wrote the music and songs. Following poor reviews, the short run of the piece ended in May and the Opera Comique closed because of the losses brought about by the production. There, Ketèlbey began a relationship with the actress and singer Charlotte "Lottie" Siegenberg. The couple married in 1906 but the relationship was childless. (Note: Lottie's fraternal nephew—and therefore Ketèlbey's nephew by marriage—Sir Clifford Curzon (1907–1982) later became famous as a pianist.)

Ketèlbey wrote music in the style of the Gilbert and Sullivan works for a comic opera The Wonder Worker, which was staged at the Grand Theatre, Fulham in 1900. The reviewer for the London Evening Standard thought Ketèlbey's score was "attractive though conventional ... No originality is shown in conception or treatment, but the conception is appropriate, and the treatment effective." The same year Ketèlbey began undertaking transcription work at the music publisher A. Hammond & Co, making arrangements of music for smaller orchestras. (Note: Palm court orchestras were becoming increasingly popular in Britain, and Ketèlbey's job was to arrange full orchestra works for these smaller ensembles.) In 1904 he also began to work for a second music publisher, Chappell & Co, a third in 1907, the Columbia Graphophone Company, and a fourth in 1910, when he worked for Elkin & Co. McCanna considers that "this hack-work may have been tedious, but the experience was invaluable in moulding the composer's fluent writing for both piano and orchestra". Throughout the time working for the companies he continued to compose and publish his own work, comprising organ music, songs, duets, piano pieces and anthems. He worked for Columbia for over twenty years and rose to the position of musical director and adviser, working with leading musicians across a range of musical styles; Columbia released more than 600 recordings with Ketèlbey conducting.

In 1912 the composer and cellist Auguste van Biene offered a prize for a new work to complement his popular piece The Broken Melody. Ketèlbey was the winner of the competition with a new composition, The Phantom Melody, which became his first major success. In the following year he won two prizes totalling £200 in a competition held by The Evening News: second place with a song for female voices, and first place with his entry for male voices. The latter song, "My Heart Still Clings to You", is described by Sant as "a typical tragical-love ballad of this time, and its almost Victorian sentimentality comes through in its words". In the early to mid-1910s Ketèlbey began to write music for silent films—a new growth industry in Britain from 1910 onwards—and he had great success in the medium until the advent of talking films in the late 1920s. (Note: In 1915 Ketèlbey published a collection of his film pieces under the name Kinema Music, and in the following year sixteen of his piano works for film appeared in New Moving Picture Book.)

=== Rising reputation and success, 1914–46 ===
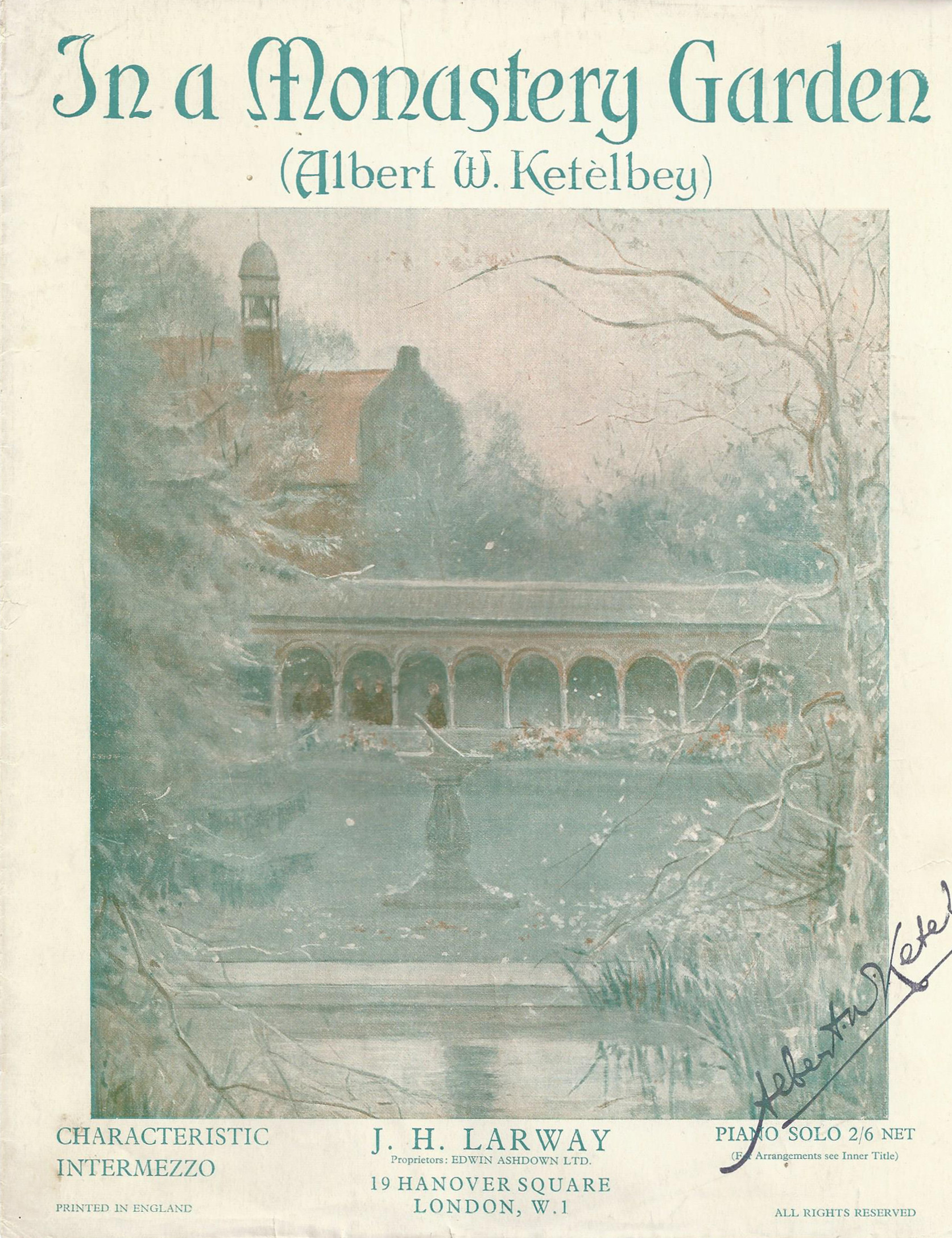
The cover for In a Monastery Garden (1915)

In 1914 Ketèlbey wrote the orchestral work In a Monastery Garden, which was published in the following year both as a piano piece and in full orchestral form. It was his first major success, his most famous piece, and became known all over the world; by 1920 over a million copies of the sheet music had been sold. There are two competing stories detailing the inspiration behind the piece: although Ketèlbey later said that he wrote the work for an old friend, he also stated that he composed it after visiting a monastery. The musicologist Peter Dempsey considers that "this piece ... remains to this day a world-renowned staple of the light-music repertoire, while McCanna opines that from the first bar, listeners "... might sooner expect such a device in the impassioned world of a [Gustav] Mahler symphony than in a genteel English salon piece". (Note: McCanna particularly highlights "where a discordant note in the melody resolves on to a chord whose bass note has simultaneously changed from major to minor, thus tingeing the moment of relaxation with a feeling of sorrow.") The success of The Phantom Melody and In a Monastery Garden led to Ketèlbey's engagement by André Charlot as the musical director for the 1916 revue Samples! at the Vaudeville Theatre. The appointment led to similar positions at other London theatres, including the Adelphi, Garrick, Shaftesbury and Drury Lane theatres.

Because of the rise in Ketèlbey's popularity, and in sales of his sheet music, in 1918 he became a member of the Performing Rights Society. (Note: The Performing Rights Society—now the PRS for Music—had been formed in 1914 to collect income for public performance of music on behalf of composers.) Except for a brief interval in 1926 when he resigned over a dispute about the allocation of funds to its members, he remained a lifelong member. In 1919 he composed the romantic work In the Moonlight, which his publisher considered to be "a work of striking beauty". In the following year he wrote Wedgwood Blue—a gavotte—and In a Persian Market; the latter became one of his more popular works. The musicologist Jonathan Bellman, calling In a Persian Market "immortal", describes it as "an 'intermezzo scene' for band or small orchestra; reprehensibly demeaning or delightfully tacky". The work was not without its critics; the composer and conductor Nicolas Slonimsky quotes the view of a Russian journal that "the suite ... had its 'immaculate conception' in imperialistic colonial England. The composer's intention is to convince the listener that all's well in the colonies where beautiful women and exotic fruits mature together, where beggars and rulers are friends, where there are no imperialists, no restive proletarians." (Note: Slonimsky quotes from Krasnukha, G (1931). "Innocent" Propaganda of Imperialism. Russian Association of Proletarian Musicians.) In The Musical Times, the pseudonymous reviewer "Ariel" described the work as "naive and inexpensive pseudo-orientalism", which led to heated correspondence in the journal over the following months between the composer and the critic.

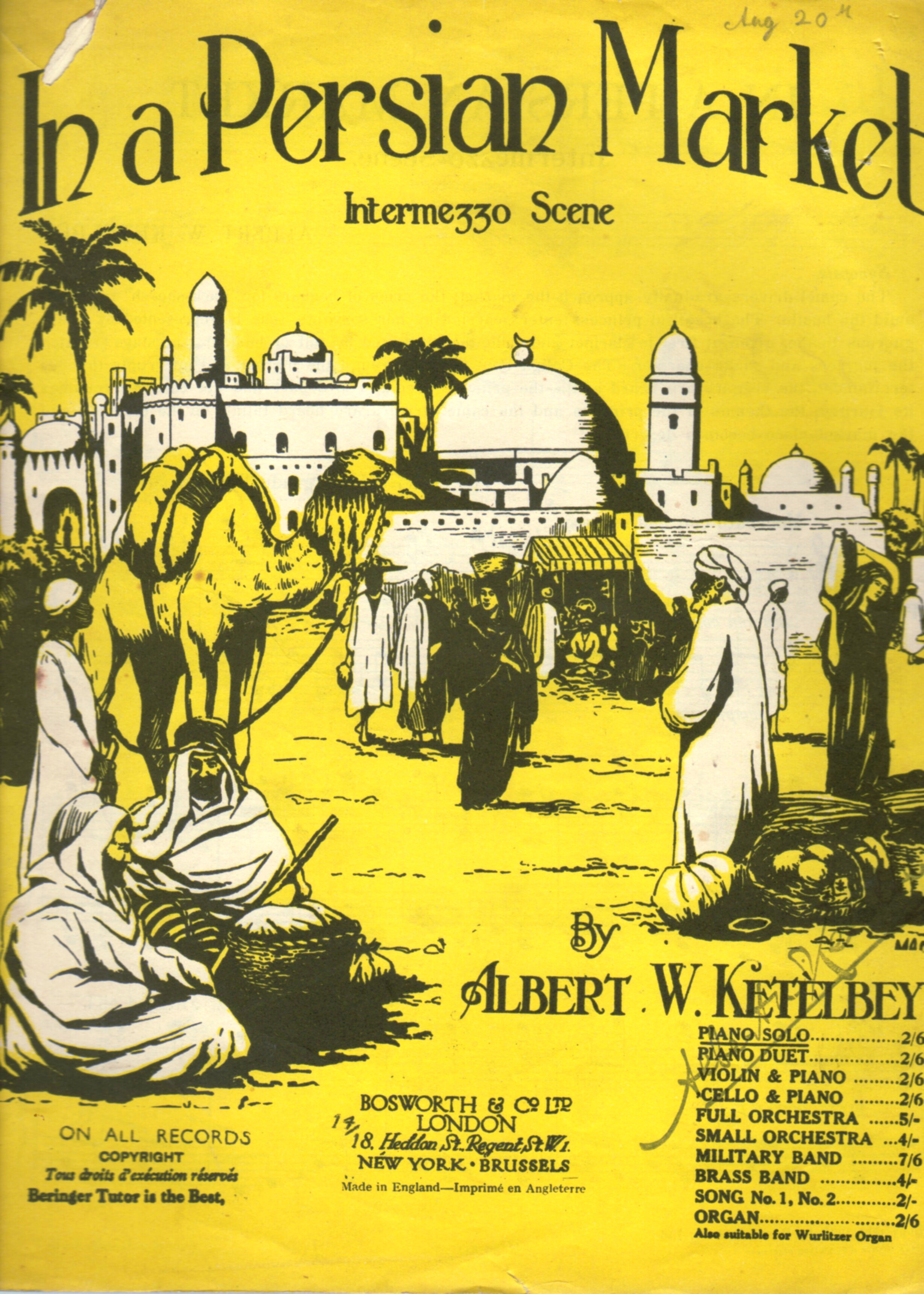
Sheet music for In a Persian Market (1920)

In 1921 Ketèlbey moved from his home in St John's Wood, where he had been living for the previous seven years, to Frognal, an area of Hampstead, north west London. He installed a billiards table in the basement, which became his favoured form of relaxation. He produced a series of orchestral pieces in the first half of the 1920s, including Bells Across the Meadows released in 1921, (Note: During the Second World War the piece was not broadcast by the BBC as it contained unaccompanied church bells, which (being reserved as a general signal in case of invasion) were not allowed to be broadcast while the conflict continued.) and Suite Romantique (1922), which the music critic Tim McDonald considers "impressive". In the following year Ketèlbey wrote In a Chinese Temple Garden, followed in 1924 by Sanctuary of the Heart and Cockney Suite. The last of these contained the finale " 'Appy 'Ampstead", which the writers Lewis and Susan Foreman describe as "... a kaleidoscope of passing images, mouth organs, a cornet playing, ... a band, ... shouts of a showman ... with his rattle and a steam engine and roundabout".

In 1923 the composer Frederic Austin wrote the opera Polly, closely based on the 1729 work of the same name by John Gay and Johann Christoph Pepusch; recordings of Austin's work were published by Columbia's main rival, the Gramophone Company. At Columbia's request Ketèlbey produced his own version of Gay's original. Austin considered that it copied elements of his, and sued for copyright infringement. Acting as a court expert witness, the composer Sir Frederick Bridge thought that the case "... is an awful bore. ... These two good men are good musicians, and they have no business to be fighting over the game. It is not worth the trouble. ... It is rubbish. I am sick of 'Polly'." After three weeks the case ended with the judge finding against Columbia.

Such was Ketèlbey's popularity that by 1924 his works could be heard several times a day in restaurants and cinemas, and in that year the Lyons tea shops spent £150,000 on playing his music in their outlets. He continued to build on his success in 1925 with In a Lovers' Garden and In the Camp of the Ancient Britons—inspired by a trip he took to Worlebury Camp, near Weston-super-Mare. He undertook annual tours of Britain, conducting his music with municipal orchestras, and also worked with the BBC Wireless Orchestra. He was invited to conduct several international orchestras, and spent time in Belgium, Germany, France, Switzerland and particularly in the Netherlands, where he built a strong relationship with the Concertgebouw and Kursaal Grand Symphony orchestras. His music was popular on the continent and his obituarist in The Times later reported that one Viennese critic considered that Ketèlbey's music was behind only that of Johann Strauss and Franz Lehár. Continental audiences often called him "The English Strauss".

Ketèlbey was financially successful enough to leave Columbia Records in 1926 to spend more time composing, although he continued to conduct for them on an occasional basis, particularly between 1928 and 1930 when he conducted sixteen of his own works with the company, published as Ketèlbey Conducting his Concert Orchestra. He spent his time undertaking annual conducting tours and composing, and in 1927 he published By the Blue Hawaiian Waters and the suite In a Fairy Realm, while in the following year he wrote another suite, Three Fanciful Etchings. His works continued to sell well, and in the October 1929 issue of the Performing Right Gazette his publisher described him as "Britain's greatest living composer"; when the advertisement was mentioned in The Musical Times, the anonymous writer wrote "we sympathise with Mr Ketèlbey in being thus raised to a pinnacle which he himself, we are sure, would be very far from claiming." Sant writes that Ketèlbey subsequently became Britain's first millionaire composer. In February 1930 he began what became an annual series of concerts at the Kingsway Hall, conducting a new work, The Clock and the Dresden Figures. In a review of the 1933 concert, the critic S.R. Nelson wrote that "as a descriptive writer Ketèlbey really does take some beating. He has the happy knack of combining infinitely melodious themes and the cleverly diluted likeness of the authentic atmosphere."

The introduction of talking films in 1927 with The Jazz Singer and the subsequent growth of the medium had a serious impact on composers and music publishers involved in the film industry as it heralded a decline in the sales of sheet music. Although Ketèlbey's income from this source declined, the period was also marked by a rise in the popularity of the radio and gramophones and his new compositions were successful with audiences at home. By the early 1930s over 1,500 broadcasts of his work were made on BBC Radio in a year, and more than 700 on continental radio stations, including a weekly Sunday programme of his music, sponsored by Decca Records on Radio Luxembourg. For this programme he wrote the theme music, "Sunday Afternoon Reverie", with the melody based on the musical notes D E C C A.

Ketèlbey wrote an intermezzo—A Birthday Greeting—in 1932, on the sixth birthday of Princess Elizabeth (later Queen Elizabeth II). His connection to royalty continued in 1934, when his march A State Procession was played to accompany the arrival of King George V at a Royal Command Performance; the king requested that the march should be played again during the interval, and he and the queen stayed in the royal box to listen to the piece. In the following year Ketèlbey wrote the march With Honour Crowned for the king's silver jubilee; the work was played for the royal family at Windsor Castle before Ketèlbey conducted its first public performance at Kingsway Hall. The work was played at that year's Trooping the Colour and at the Jubilee Thanksgiving Service at St Paul's Cathedral.

Ketèlbey continued to conduct on his annual tours during the Second World War, but these were on a smaller scale because of travel restrictions. He also continued with his annual concerts at Kingsway Hall, and introduced a new march, Fighting for Freedom, which he had written in a supportive response to Winston Churchill's "We shall fight on the beaches" speech. Apart from composing and conducting, he also acted as a Special Constable during the war.

=== Post-war; retirement and death, 1946–59 ===
The winter of 1946–47 was harsh, and in February the sub-zero temperatures burst the water main outside Ketèlbey's Hampstead home. With his house partially flooded, he lost most of his correspondence, manuscripts and papers, and he and his wife both contracted pneumonia. The couple were taken to the Regent's Park Nursing Home, where Lottie died two days later. He sold his house and moved temporarily to the Hendon Hall Hotel, where he had a nervous breakdown. He spent the remainder of the year staying in hotels in southern England; in Bournemouth he began a relationship with Mabel Maud Pritchett, a hotel manageress, and the couple married in October in the following year.

In 1949 Ketèlbey and his new wife moved to the Isle of Wight, and purchased Rookstone, Egypt Hill, in Cowes, where he partly retired, although he composed occasionally. Tastes in popular music had changed during and after the Second World War and his music declined in popularity; his income in 1940 had been £3,493, which dropped to £2,906 in 1950—a particularly steep drop when wartime inflation is considered. (Note: £3,493 in 1940 equates to approximately £170,000 in 2015, while £2,906 in 1950 equates to approximately £89,000 in 2015, according to calculations based on Consumer Price Index measure of inflation.) McCanna writes that apart from a commission for the National Brass Band competition in 1945, Ketèlbey produced nothing memorable after the war, and his biographer Keith Anderson considers that in the postwar period Ketèlbey's work "... lacked novelty. Of the handful of works published ... most were reworkings of old material, although the composer attempted to disguise the origins". The BBC also began to ignore his work. In their 1949 Festival of Light Music, none of his compositions were played, which he found distressing. In his letter to the Director-General of the BBC, Sir William Haley, Ketèlbey said the exclusion was "a public insult". His music still found an audience: in 1952 and 1953 With Honour Crowned was again played as a slow march at the Trooping the Colour ceremony.

Ketèlbey died in his Cowes home of heart and renal failure on 26 November 1959. By the time of his death he had slipped into obscurity. Only a handful of mourners attended his funeral, which was held at Golders Green Crematorium in London.

== Music ==
Under his own name and at least six pseudonyms, Ketèlbey composed several hundred works, about 150 of them for the orchestra. In the Grove Dictionary of Music and Musicians, Phillip Scowcroft writes, "His gifts for melody and sensitive, colourful scoring ensured continuing popularity with light orchestras and bands until after 1945. The most popular of his hundreds of pieces emphasize emotionalism and sometimes exaggerated effects at the expense of structure and harmonic subtlety."

=== Early works and serious music ===
Ketèlbey's early compositions are classical and orthodox in form, reflecting the training at Trinity College. The first substantial work was a piano sonata (1888); it was followed by a Caprice for piano and orchestra (1892), a Concertstück for piano and orchestra (circa 1893) and a piano concerto in G minor (1895). Ketèlbey's piano writing was notable for its brilliance, and the composer's own performance of the solo part of the Concertstück brought out that quality. As a student, Ketèlbey composed a cadenza for the first movement of Beethoven's First Piano Concerto, judged "clever and effective" in performance in 1890.

For the chamber repertoire, Ketèlbey composed a string quartet (c. 1896) and a quintet for piano and wind (1896) which won the Costa Prize and the College Gold Medal. His 1894 Romance for violin and piano was praised as "a charming, musicianly work". His other early works include choral pieces, including the anthems "Every good Gift"; "Behold upon the mountains", and "Be strong, all ye people" (all 1896). After these works he moved professionally into conducting light opera, and serious music became the exception rather than the rule in his compositions.

Ketèlbey's concert music was less well known in England than in continental Europe, where he conducted many programmes of his own works for the Concertgebouw Orchestra and others. The composer's more avowedly serious music was less widely esteemed by his compatriots. In a 1928 profile the magazine The British Musician commented, "There is no need to explain here why his serious music, whether written thirty years ago or as recently as 1927 ... has not won the popularity of, say, Edward German's dances: it is pleasant music, delightfully scored; but it is not so fascinating as that from which it derives—the music of the Viennese writers of dance music, of Delibes and Gounod and the like." The reviewer added, "Albert Ketèlbey's works of the Monastery Garden type are by far the best that anyone in this country has written, and they represent the end to which he was born."

=== Light orchestral ===
Ketèlbey, a capable player of the cello, clarinet, oboe, and horn, was a skilled orchestrator. He generally followed the normal style for light music of his day: picturesque and romantic, with colourful orchestral effects. Reviewing a collection of Ketèlbey's music, the authors of The Penguin Guide to Recorded Classical Music commented in 2008, "when vulgarity is called for it is not shirked—only it's a stylish kind of vulgarity!" Many of Ketèlbey's pieces are programmatic, typically lasting between four and six minutes. His penchant for arranging his works for various combinations of instruments makes them harder to categorise than the works of many other composers. His first two pieces to make a mark with a wide public were The Phantom Melody (1911) and In a Monastery Garden (1915), both best known in their orchestral versions, but originally written for cello and piano and for solo piano respectively. For the familiar orchestral version of the second of these pieces the composer published a synopsis:

The first theme represents a poet's reverie in the quietude of the monastery garden amidst beautiful surroundings—the calm serene atmosphere—the leafy trees and the singing birds. The second theme in the minor expresses the more 'personal' note of sadness, of appeal and contrition. Presently, the monks are heard chanting the "Kyrie Eleison" with the organ playing and the chapel bell ringing. The first theme is now heard in a quieter manner as if it had become more ethereal and distant; the singing of the monks is again heard—it becomes louder and more insistent, bringing the piece to a conclusion in a glow of exultation.

Ketèlbey followed the same basic formula for many of his most popular later works. For In a Persian Market his synopsis notes "the camel drivers approaching, the cries of beggars, entry of beautiful princess (represented by a languorous theme given at first to clarinet and cello and then full orchestra) ... she watches the jugglers and snake-charmers ... the Caliph passes by, interrupting the entertainment ... all depart, their themes heard faintly in the distance, and the marketplace becomes deserted." Ketèlbey establishes the eastern setting in the opening section, employing the distinctive melodic intervals, A–B♭–E. The orchestral players are instructed to sing at two points in the score, a descending motif representing beggars crying for baksheesh. Although one contemporary critic belittled the music as "pseudo-orientalism", McCanna comments that "The princess portrayed by the big romantic theme is a cousin of the princesses in Stravinsky's Firebird".

Ketèlbey sought to repeat the exoticism of In a Persian Market in several later pieces. Among them is In a Chinese Temple Garden (1923), described as an "oriental phantasy", with episodes depicting a priestly incantation, two lovers, a wedding procession, a street brawl and the restoration of calm by the beating of the temple gong. Another example is In the Mystic Land of Egypt (1931), which, like its Persian predecessor, opens with a vigorous march theme followed by a broad romantic melody. Again, the composer employs unconventional musical devices for colour—in this case a chromatic scale, descending at each appearance until the closing bars, where it is inverted. In 1958, the critic Ronald Ever wrote that Ketèlbey was noted for his use of "every exotic noisemaker known to man—chimes, orchestra bells, gongs (all sizes and nationalities), cymbals, woodblocks, xylophone, drums of every variety". Ever commented that Ketèlbey's exoticism had left an immovable impression of eastern music on western ears, to which "Oriental music is Ketèlbey music: the clashing cymbals; the little pinging bells; the minor modes; the amazingly graphic mincing step created by rapidly reiterated notes; the coy taps on the woodblock."

Among Ketèlbey's light orchestral works with a wholly British flavour is Bells Across the Meadows (1921), redolent, in the words of McDonald, of "rose-entwined thatched cottages standing amidst gardens full of hollyhocks with a gentle brook bubbling on its rustic way and cows grazing peacefully in the pastures beyond". Urban life was evoked in the five-movement Cockney Suite (1924), described by The Times as "character pieces complete with leering saxophone, cheeky mouth-organ, and some infernally catchy tunes". Ketèlbey depicts successively a royal procession from Buckingham Palace to the Houses of Parliament; an East End pub, with a main theme based on the Cockney ditty "'Arf a pint of mild and bitter"; a waltz at a palais de danse; a sombre glimpse of the Cenotaph in Whitehall; and in the finale, "'Appy 'Ampstead", a picture of the August Bank Holiday fair on Hampstead Heath.

Much of the music Ketèlbey wrote as accompaniment to silent films between 1915 and 1929, though lucrative at the time, has proved ephemeral, although he reused and rearranged some of it in solo pieces for amateur pianists. With the requirements of cinemas of all sizes in mind, his film music was published in the "Bosworth Loose Leaf Film Play Music Series" in versions for solo piano or for small orchestras. The titles offered included Dramatic Agitato, Amaryllis (described by the composer as "suitable for use in dainty, fickle scenes"), Mystery ("greatly in favour for uncanny and weird picturizations"), "Agitato Furioso" ("famous for its excellence in playing to riots, storms, wars, etc.") and Bacchanale de Montmartre (for "cabaret, orgy and riotous continental scenes").

=== Instrumental works ===
In addition to arrangements for solo instruments of his popular orchestral works, Ketèlbey wrote a range of music for organ and for piano. Some of the more serious of these pieces were published under his "Vodorinski" pen name. Among the organ works are Pastorale and Rêverie dramatique, both dating from about 1911. The piano works include the early classical pieces such as the 1888 Sonata, and shorter items in a more popular style, such as Rêverie (1894) and Les pèlerins (1925), by way of A Romantic Melody (1898), Pensées joyeuses (1888), In the Woodlands (1921), A Song of Summer (1922), and Légende triste (1923). The musical influences on his piano works were on the whole conservative: for the early works McCanna mentions Haydn and Mendelssohn in this context. Much of the piano music published in the years after the First World War was aimed at a domestic audience; it requires only a modest technical proficiency to play and is simple in structure with deft harmonies. The most commercially successful of the Vodorinski works was the Prelude in C♯ minor (1907). McCanna comments that not only the title but the material is reminiscent of Rachmaninoff: "the music turns out to copy some of the more illustrious composer's features, notably the final fortissimo statement of the melody in the bass". Ketèlbey followed Chopin's model in several waltzes in the key of A♭ major, including La grâcieuse (1907) and two different pieces under the title Valse brillante (1905 and 1911).

=== Songs ===
Throughout his career Ketèlbey composed songs, providing the words for most of those written after 1913. His first, unpublished, song, "Be Still, Sad Heart" dates from 1892, and during the rest of the 1890s he wrote songs for children as well as sentimental ballads like "Believe Me True" (1897) for their seniors. Many had words by Florence Hoare, whose other lyrics included English words for songs by Tchaikovsky, Gounod and Brahms. Ketèlbey's popular ballads included "The Heart's Awakening" (1907), "My Heart-a-dream" (1909), "I Loved You More Than I Knew" (1912), "My Heart Still Clings to You" (1913), "Will You Forgive?" (1924), and "A Birthday Song" (1933). He wrote patriotic songs for use in three wars: "There's Something in the English After all" (1899, during the Boer War), "The Trumpet Voice of Motherland is Calling" (1914, for the First World War) and "Fighting for Freedom" (1941, during the Second World War). His sole Shakespeare setting, "Blow! Blow! Thou Winter Wind" (1898, revised 1951), was written as incidental music for a production of As You Like It.

== Reputation and legacy ==
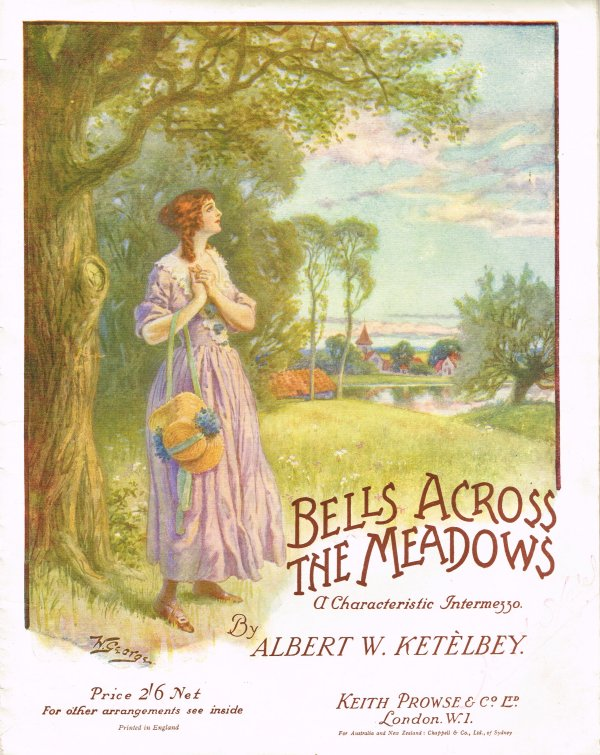
Sheet music for Bells Across the Meadows

The obituarist for The Musical Times wrote that "Ketèlbey's especial fame ... consisted in his phenomenal success as a composer of light music. His remarkable gift for alluring tunes, rich in homely sentiment, was reflected in the immense popularity of [his] pieces". McCanna opines that Ketèlbey's popularity

lay in its memorable expressive melodies combined with its ability to set the scene by enhanced use of different kinds of colour: local colour in the choice of characteristic settings, often with explicit narrative captions printed above the music; musical colour in the form of exotic scales and harmonies; orchestral colour in the novel use of singing by the players and of sound effects executed by the drummer.

During his tenure at Columbia, Ketèlbey promoted the works of several composers, including Haydn Wood, Charles Ancliffe, Ivor Novello, James W. Tate and Kenneth J. Alford, helping to increase the popularity of British light music. Ronnie Ronalde made In a Monastery Garden his signature tune from 1958, while Serge Gainsbourg used the theme of In a Persian Market for his 1977 song "My Lady Héroïne".

Dempsey, writing in 2001, considered that Ketèlbey's "late-Romantic tone miniatures ... are deserving of reappraisal". The composer's reputation has improved over time, and the cultural historian Andrew Blake identifies a "form of 'cult following'" for him. In the 21st century, Ketèlbey's music is still frequently heard on radio and in a 2003 poll by the BBC radio programme Your Hundred Best Tunes, Bells across the Meadows was voted thirty-sixth most popular tune of all time. The last night of the corporation's 2009 Proms season included In a Monastery Garden to mark the fiftieth anniversary of Ketèlbey's death; it was the first time the tune had been included in the festival's finale. Tim Page, the music critic for The Washington Post, considers that Ketèlbey's work expresses an "ornate, perfumed, genteel Orientalism [which] found expression in miniatures"; he adds that "all of Ketèlbey's music is pretty weird—deeply derivative yet unmistakably personal, tidy in form yet grandiose in execution, amiable and often touching despite its unashamed mawkishness."

== Notes, references and sources ==
=== Sources ===
- Bellman, Jonathan (1998). The Exotic in Western Music. Lebanon, NH: Northeastern University Press. ISBN 978-1-55553-319-9.
- Blake, Andrew (1997). The Land Without Music: Music, Culture and Society in Twentieth-century Britain. Manchester: Manchester University Press. ISBN 978-0-7190-4299-7.
- Bourderionnet, Olivier (2011). Swing Troubadours: Brassens, Vian, Gainsbourg: les Trente Glorieuses en 33 tours (in French). Birmingham, AL: Summa Publications. ISBN 978-1-883479-64-0.
- Brown, Julie; Davison, Annette (2013). The Sounds of the Silents in Britain. New York, NY: Oxford University Press. ISBN 978-0-19-979761-5.
- Foreman, Lewis; Foreman, Susan (2005). London: A Musical Gazetteer. New Haven, CT and London: Yale University Press. ISBN 978-0-300-10402-8.
- Griffel, Margaret Ross (2012). Operas in English: A Dictionary. Plymouth, Devon: Scarecrow Press. ISBN 978-0-8108-8325-3.
- Ketèlbey, Albert W (1915). In a Monastery Garden. London: J.H. Larway. OCLC 6203274.
- March, Ivan; Greenfield, Edward; Layton, Robert; Czajkowski, Paul (2008). The Penguin Guide to Recorded Classical Music, 2009. London: Penguin. ISBN 978-0-14-103335-8.
- McCanna, Tom (2000). The Music of Albert W. Ketèlbey: A Catalogue. Sheffield: University of Sheffield. OCLC 48092577.
- PRS for Music (2014). 100 Years of British Music. London: Music Sales Limited. ISBN 978-1-78323-565-0.
- Sant, John (2001). Albert Ketèlbey: From the Sanctuary of his Heart. Sutton Coldfield: Manifold Publishing. ISBN 978-0-9538058-0-8.
