= Behr Brothers & Co. =

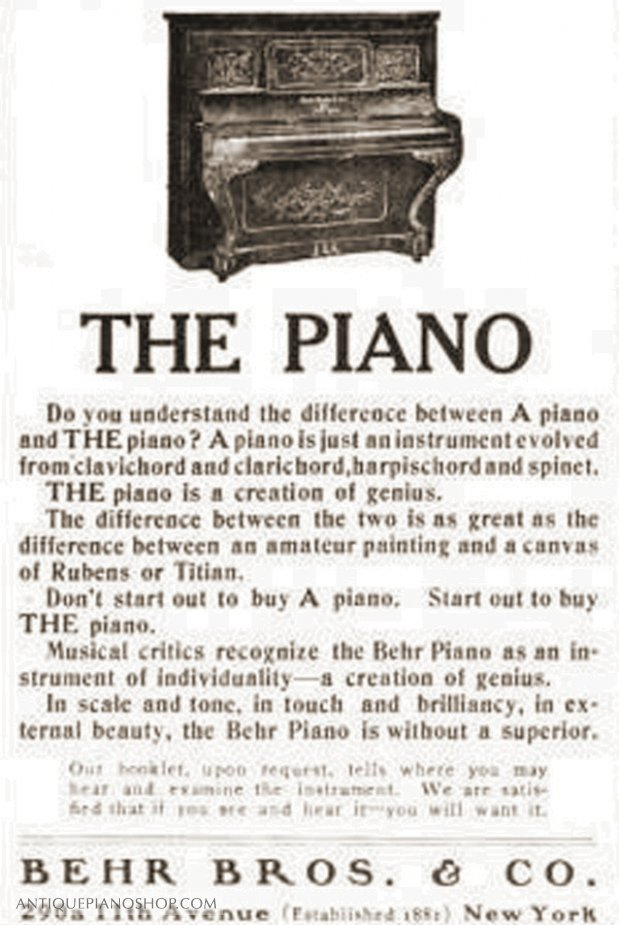
piano

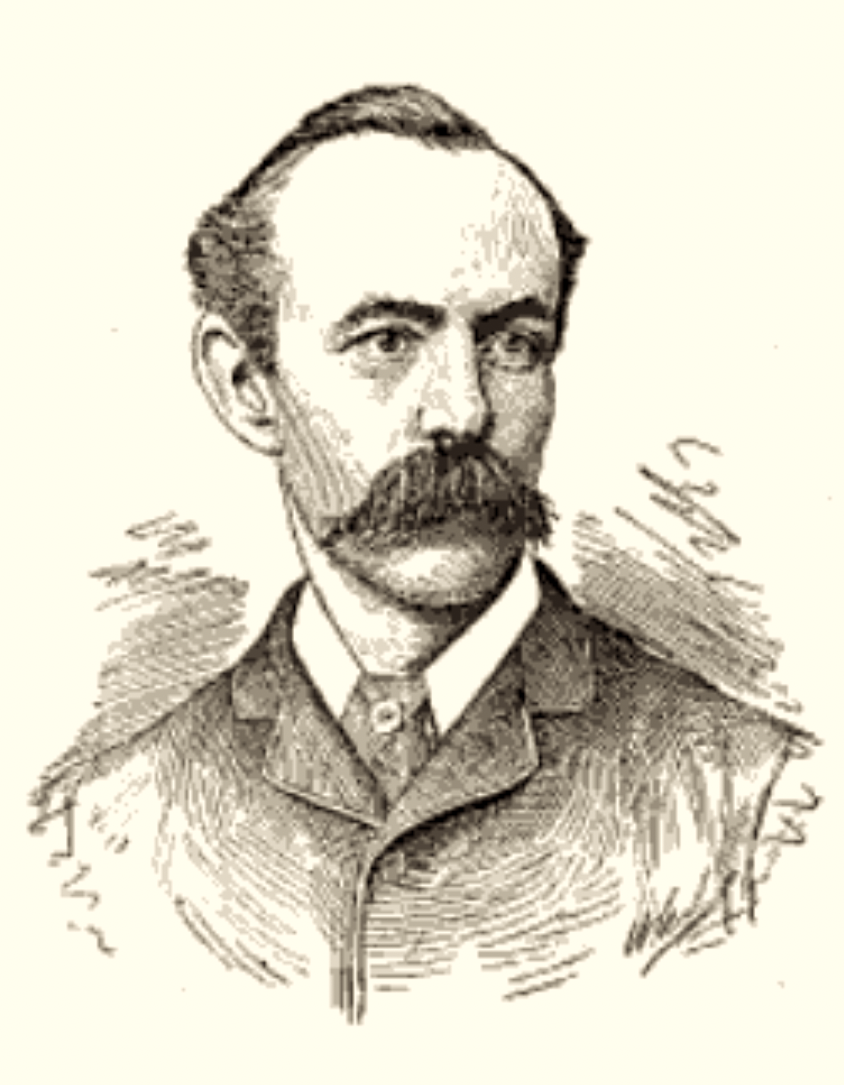
1890 sketch of Henry Behr.

Behr Brothers was a New York based piano company founded in 1880 and hailed as a major contributor to the piano industry of the late nineteenth and early twentieth centuries. Henry Behr of Hamburg, Germany initially established a piano company in New York alongside Leopold Peck (of "Hardman Peck Piano Company") in 1877, named "Behr & Peck", which operated until 1879. In 1880, Behr and his brother Edward Behr went into partnership to form "H. Behr and Brother Piano Company", although this later changed to "Behr, Brother and Company", followed by "Behr Brothers & Company". The company was taken over by Kohler & Campbell in 1910, who continued to produce pianos under the Behr name until the 1950s.

Highest awards have been granted to Behr Bros. instruments at leading world's fairs and centennial expositions, such as the World Cotton Centennial held in New Orleans in 1884 and the World's Columbian Exposition held in Chicago in 1893. Xavier Scharwenka, Moritz Moszkowski, S. B. Mills, Edottard Remenyi and a host of other world famous artists and composers have endorsed instruments bearing the Behr Bros. & Co. logo.
