= Gustave Barnes =

Australian artist (1877–1921)

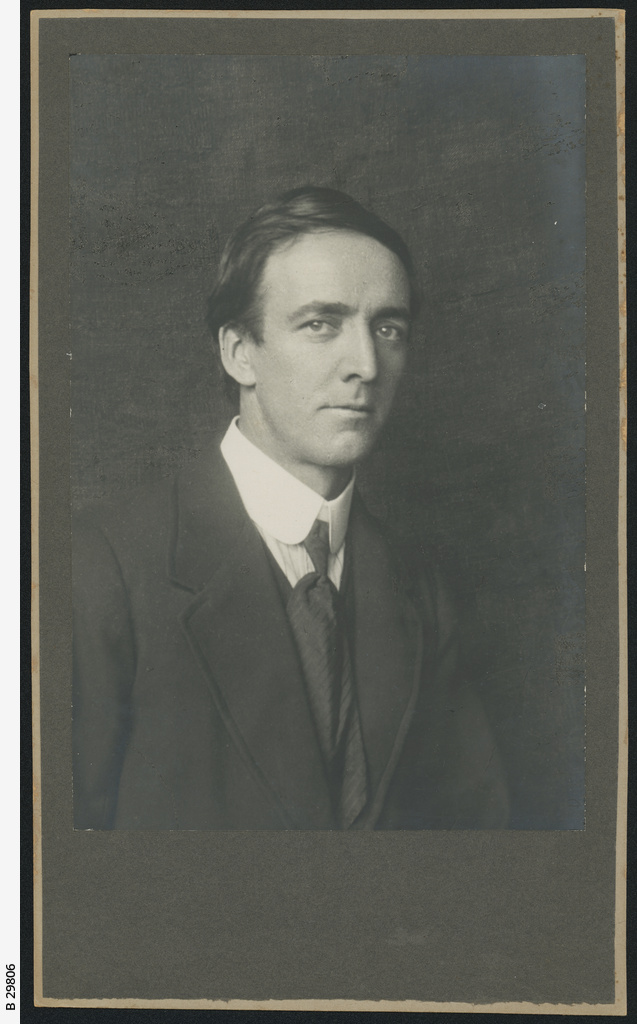
- Born: 9 May 1877; Islington
- Died: 14 March 1921; Adelaide
- Education: Royal College of Art
- Occupations: Painter, etcher, landscape painter, curator
- Employers: Art Gallery of South Australia; Royal Doulton

Gustave Adrian Barnes (9 May 1877 – 14 March 1921) was an Australian art curator, painter, arts administrator and violinist.

== Early life and education ==
Barnes was born in 1877 in London, England. He emigrated to Australia as a child but returned to England later in life to study violin and art at the Royal College of Art, London. His father was a designer and plaster modeller with Barnes and Neate where Barnes began his artistic training. Barnes was active in the drawing and painting circles of Adelaide.

== Career ==
Barnes spent two summers painting and studying in Fifeshire, Scotland, alongside fellow South Australian painter, Hans Heysen. Heysen was especially complimentary of Barnes' works, The Quarry and The Pipes of Pan, noting that Barnes' use of colour had becoming richer and more balanced over the years.

For a time Barnes was employed as a designer, painter and modeller for the Doulton & Co. whilst also continuing to study painting at night classes.

Barnes returned to Australia when his father died and took over his father's business. He was later employed by the Board of Governors of the South Australian Public Library, Museum, and Art Gallery as an arts administrator between 1915 and 1918.

From 1918 to 1921, Barnes was promoted to curator of the National Gallery of South Australia.

He died in Adelaide, South Australia on 14 March 1921, and is buried at Payneham Cemetery, Adelaide.

His work was exhibited posthumously at the South Australia Society of Arts Gallery, in the Institute Building on North Terrace only weeks after his death. It was opened by the Governor of South Australia, Sir Archibald Weigall.

== Select works ==
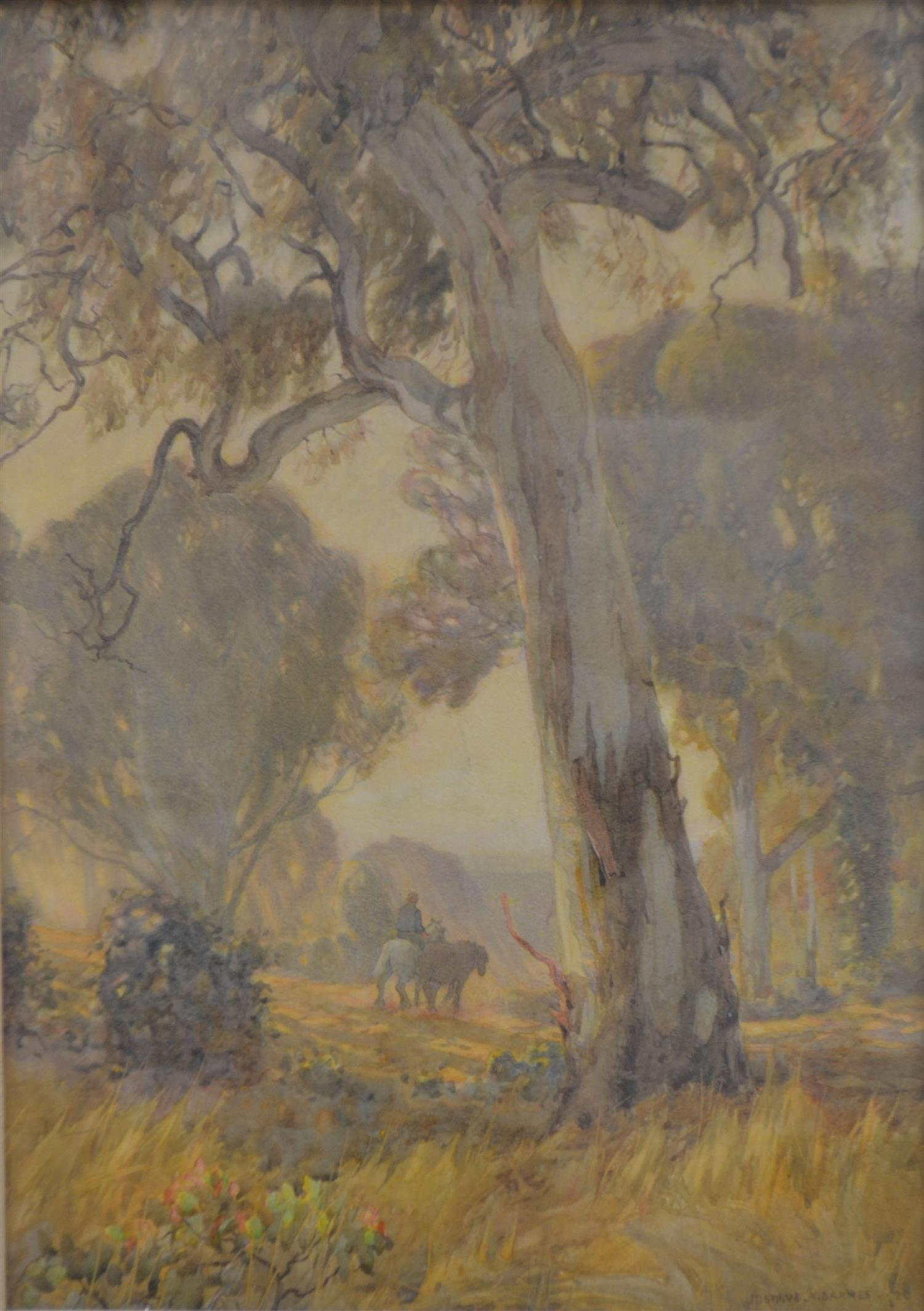
Bush Scene, 1920, Watercolour.

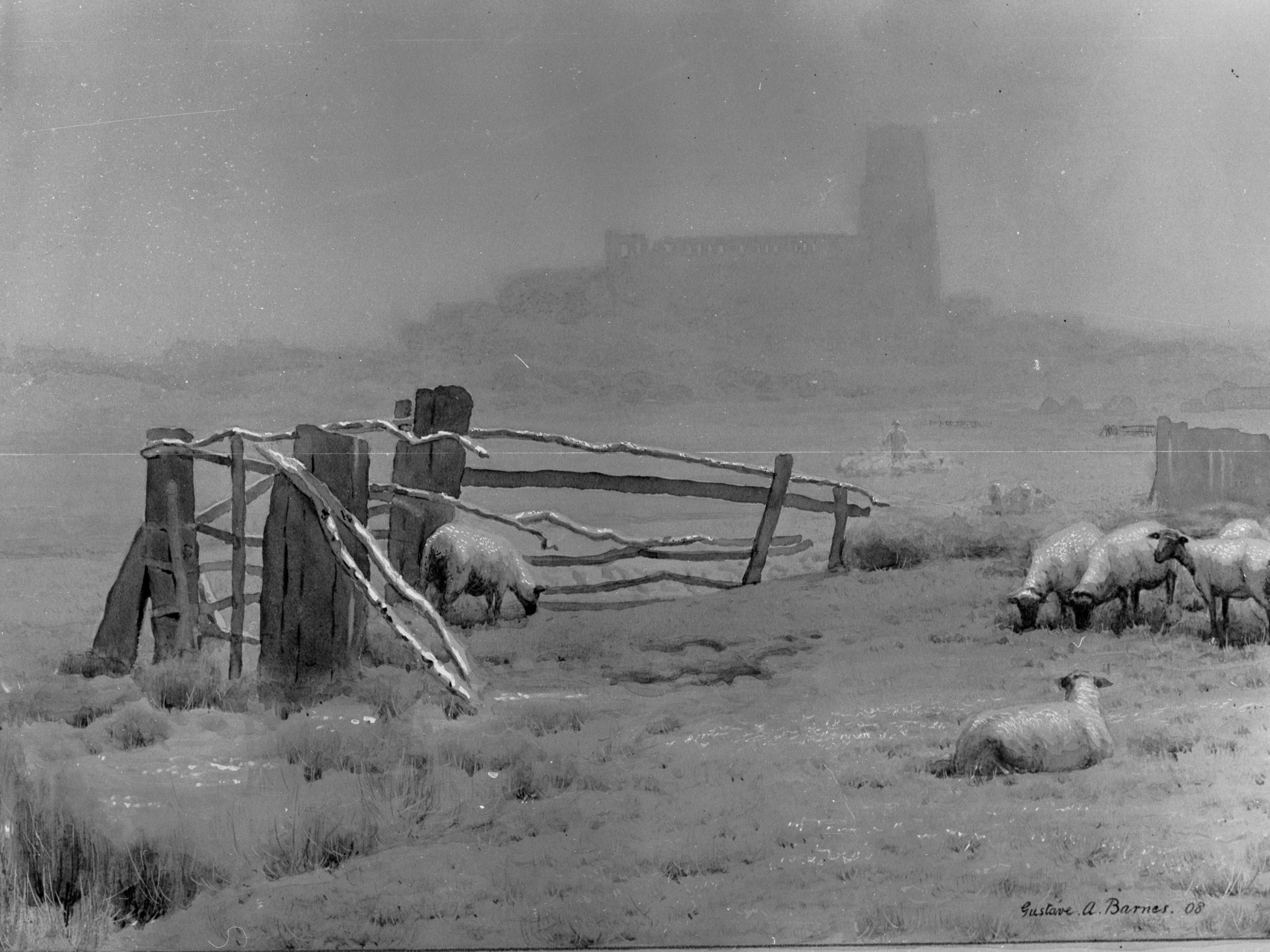
Sheep in field, 1908, glass negative.

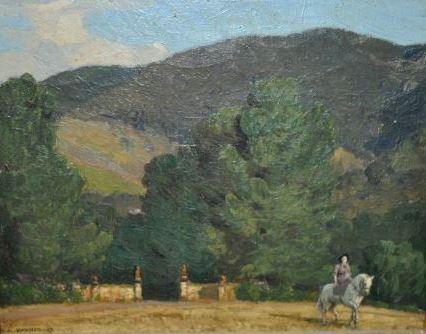
Enchanted Ground Near Kensington Gardens, oil on canvassed board, 1922

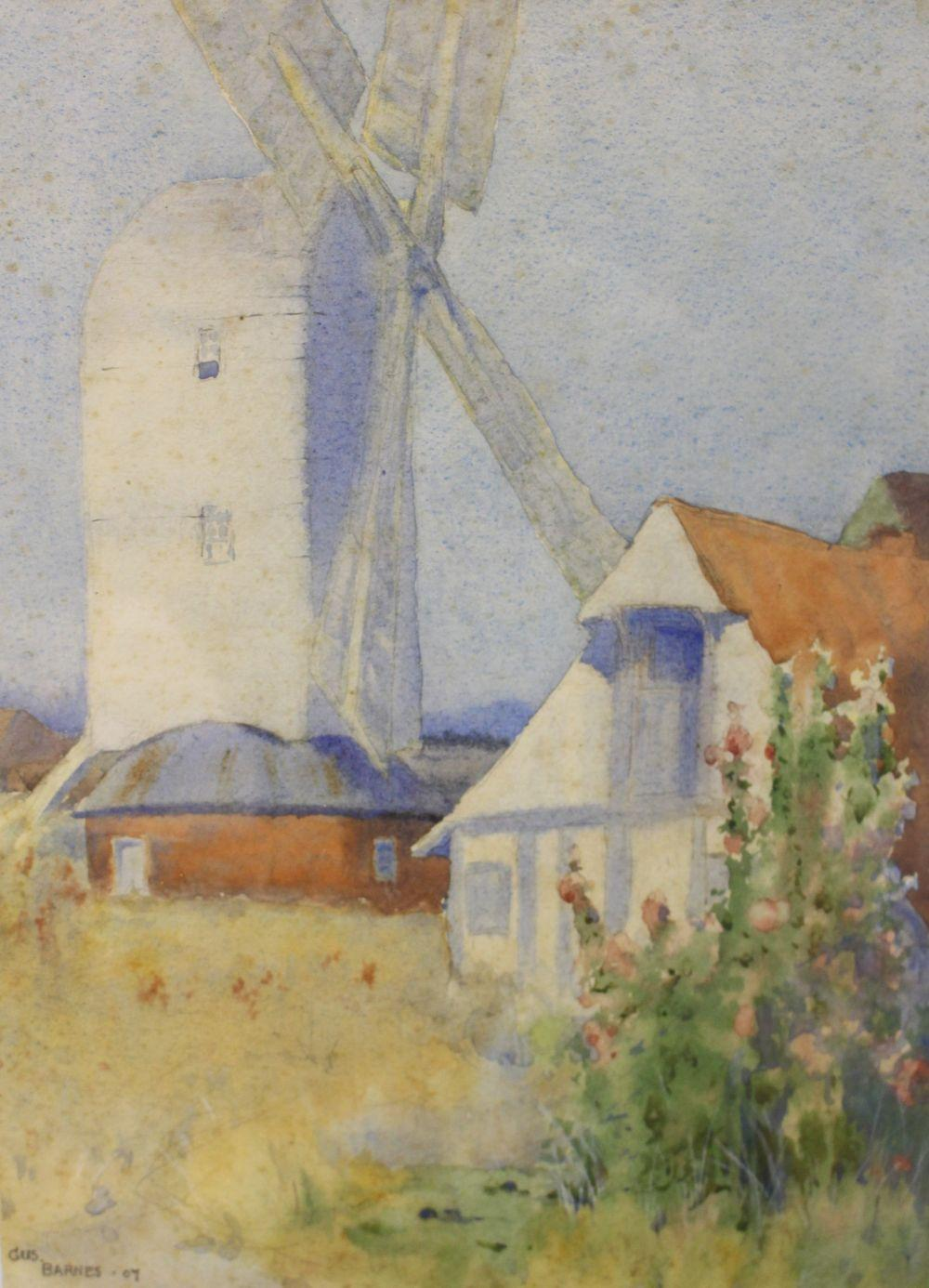
untitled windmill scene, 1907.
