= Eastwood Performing Arts Center =

Theater in Los Angeles

Coordinates: 34°05′26″N 118°18′29″W

The building at 1089 North Oxford Avenue in Hollywood, Los Angeles, California, United States was originally a meeting hall for fraternal organizations and has been a theater space since the 1960s. Currently known as the Eastwood Performing Arts Center, the theater has operated under many names over the years, and hosted early work by director Rob Reiner and the Groundlings improv troupe.

== History ==
The Hollywood group of Odd Fellows was organized around 1923. The Hollywood Lodge 465 of the Odd Fellows club was originally located at the street address 1077 Oxford.

Around 1931 the IOOF temple was moved or the street address was changed to 1089 North Oxford. Circa 1933 the building was known as the Hollywood Odd Fellows Temple. In 1934 it was used for meetings of the Hollywood parlor of the Native Sons of the Golden West. In 1945 it was a meeting place for the Fraternal Order of Eagles. In 1946 the Catholic Daughters of America were using that space. The Canadian Legion used the IOOF Hall for meetings as of 1959.

In 1961 and 1964 the address was home to what was called the Actors' Theater. In October 1963 the Young Peoples' Theatre was holding auditions for a production of Tom Sawyer at the address. In 1965 the touring Actor's Theater Repertory Company, based out of 1089 N. Oxford, was formed from a merger of Rudy Solari's Actor's Theater and Corey Allen's Freeway Circuit. By 1967 it was the Oxford Theatre. In 1969 a young Rob Reiner and friends were using the venue for one-acts they had written and directed.

An Oxford Theater Repertory Company was formed in 1970. Ghosts by Henrik Ibsen was staged there in 1971. What was called the Oxford Playhouse in 1973 had two stages and a weekend children's theater program. The Groundlings improv and theater group did their first show in the basement theater of the building in 1974 before moving to Melrose Avenue in 1975.

By 1975 the Los Angeles Actors' Theatre was resident in the building. The company returned to the building in 1984 as part of the Olympic Arts Festival for the 1984 Summer Games in Los Angeles. In 1988 plays were staged at what was being called the Ensemble Theater. In 1991 the place was called the Met. Doma Theatre Co. was staging musicals at the Met in 2012.

Now called the Eastwood Performing Arts Center (Eastwood is short for East Hollywood), the renovated building houses two theaters, the 99-seat main stage, and the 40-seat Oxford Underground black box theater.

== See also ==
- Barnsdall Art Park
