= Bells Across the Meadows =

Classical music piece

- by Albert Ketèlbey
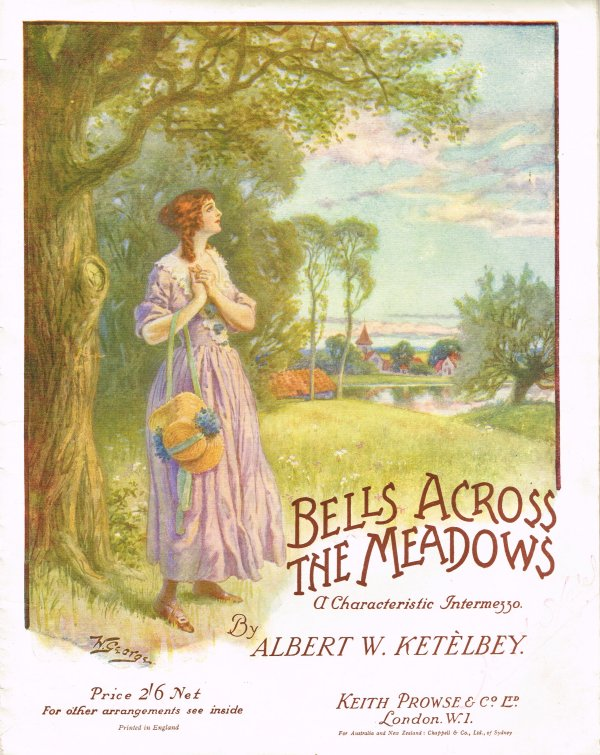
- Cover of the sheet music
- Key: E-flat major
- Genre: light music
- Published: 1921
- Scoring: orchestra; piano; other arrangements, including brass band

Bells Across the Meadows is a piece of light classical music by Albert Ketèlbey. It was published in 1921 for both orchestra and piano, and first recorded by the composer a year later. In 1927, Ketèlbey added lyrics to the piece, which was published as a song for voice and piano. Ketèlbey called the piece a "characteristic intermezzo". In 2003 it was selected in the final poll by the BBC radio programme Your Hundred Best Tunes and voted the 36th most popular classical tune of all time.

== History ==
English composer Albert Ketèlbey's instrumental piece Bells Across the Meadows was published by Keith Prowse & Co in 1921, in versions for both orchestra and piano. The first recording, with orchestra conducted by the composer, was made in April 1922. Arrangements for varying instruments followed, and the work has been popular with brass bands. Song lyrics by the composer were added in 1927 but have rarely been recorded.

The composition was selected in a 2003 poll by the BBC radio programme Your Hundred Best Tunes and voted the 36th most popular classical tune of all time.

== Theme and music ==
A synopsis by Ketèlbey mentions solo bells beginning the music, followed by a quiet melody in strings and woodwinds. When repeated, a "chimes effect" provides the illusion of being "heard from a distant belfry across the meadows". Bells accompany a middle section. In a reprise of the first part, the melody is given to the cellos, accompanied by soft chimes. A last repeat is carried by "bells ringing out joyously and then gradually dying away in the distance".

In 1993 music critic Tim McDonald described Bells Across the Meadows as "unashamedly sentimental", adding that it offers modern audiences evocations of "by-gone scenes" reminiscent of nostalgic and idealised Victorian-era illustrations of the English countryside.

The piece is in E-flat major and common time, and is marked "Moderato". The entry of the melody is marked "Melodia con espressione", and the final entry of the bells is marked "Bells (joyously)".

== Recordings ==
Bells Across the Meadows has been recorded dozens of times. Ketèlbey's own recording with his concert orchestra was reissued in 2002 in volume 2 of the collection British Light Music, described by a reviewer as mood music "unashamedly unrestrained and sentimental and melodramatic".

The piece was included in the album The Immortal Works of Ketèlbey, part of Decca's 1969 Concert Series with the Royal Philharmonic Orchestra conducted by Eric Rogers; a 2014 reviewer of the series' CD reissue noted the Phase 4 Stereo recording's "ear-pricking tintinnabulations". In 1995 it was recorded by the New London Orchestra conducted by Ronald Corp; this was later anthologized in a 2006 four-CD set called British Light Music Classics. A recording is included in the BBC's 2003 six-CD collection of the final listener-poll selections for Your Hundred Best Tunes.
