= In a Persian Market =

1920 light classical music piece by Albert Ketèlbey

- Light music by Albert Ketèlbey
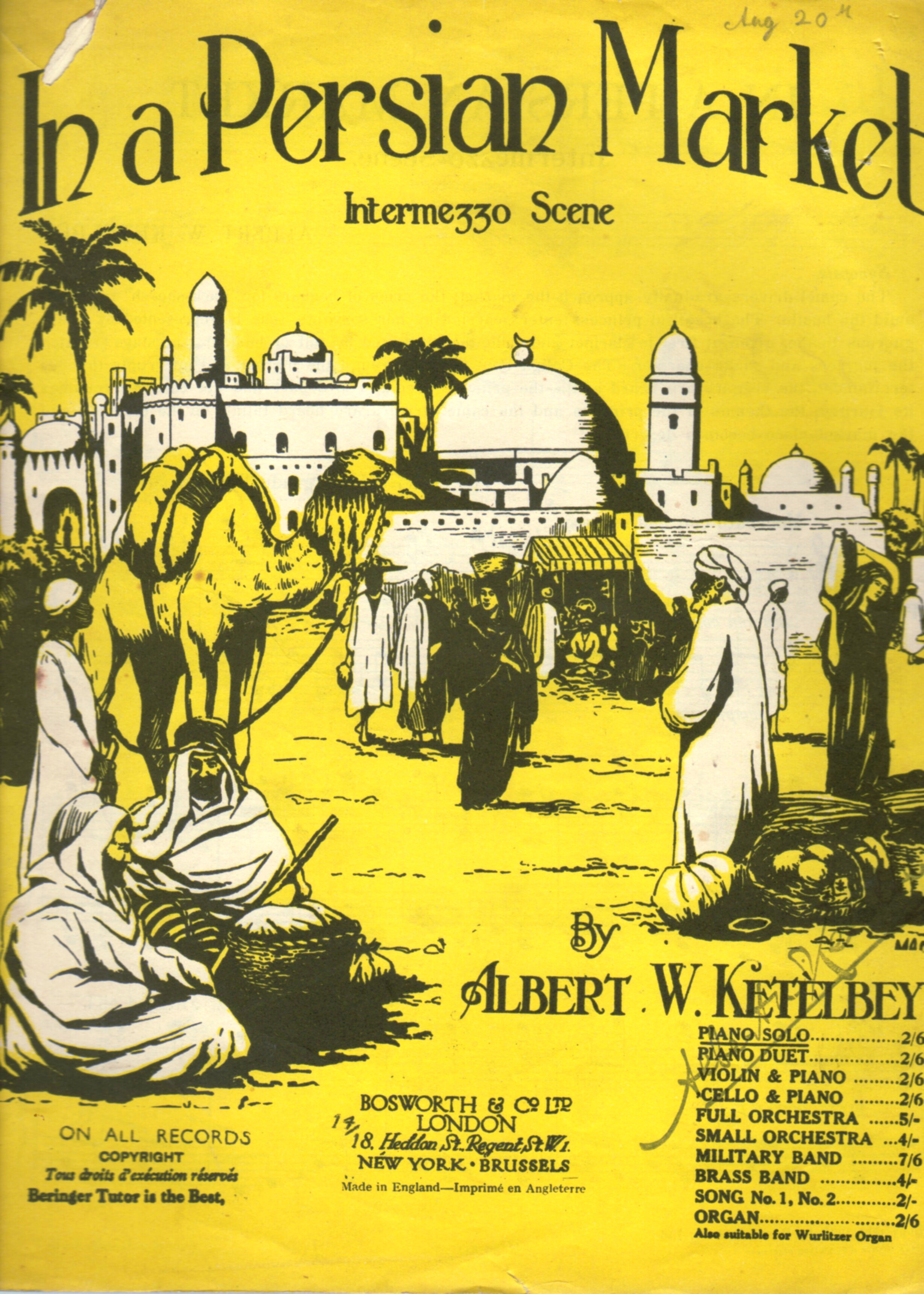
- Cover of the sheet music
- Composed: 1920
- Published: 1921
- Scoring: orchestra; optional chorus

In a Persian Market is a piece of light classical music for orchestra with optional chorus by Albert Ketèlbey who composed it in 1920. Subtitled Intermezzo Scene, it was published by Bosworth in 1921. It evokes exotic images of camel-drivers, jugglers, and snake-charmers. When it was first published in a version for piano, it was advertised as an "educational novelty".

== Theme and music ==
A synopsis of scenes by the composer mentions a caravan arriving, beggars, a princess carried by servants, jugglers, snake-charmers, and a caliph. After the princess and the caliph have left, a muezzin calls to prayer from a minaret. The caravan continues its journey, and the market becomes silent. The duration is around six minutes.

An opening march shares "exotic" intervals, A – B-flat – E, with the composer's oriental intermezzo Wonga, used for the play Ye Gods in 1916. A chorus of beggars sings: "Baksheesh, baksheesh Allah"; passers-by sing "Empshi" ("get away"). A romantic theme portrays the princess, similar to Stravinsky's Firebird. Trumpets announce the caliph. The concluding section "Call to prayer" of 22 measures was added later.

== Publishing and reception ==
The music was first announced in Musical Opinion in January 1921 as a piano piece, in a section "Educational novelties”. Half a year later, Bosworth printed the orchestral version.

In a Persian Market has been regarded as a work of orchestral impressionism. The work has been used as theatre music for comic oriental scenes, used in sketches by Morecambe and Wise, and by The Two Ronnies, and also in schools as theatrical repertory.

== Selected recordings ==
In a Persian Market was recorded completely, with chorus, in 1999 by the New London Light Opera Chorus and the New London Orchestra, conducted by Ronald Corp. It is part of a 2002 recording of the same name, an anthology of historic recordings of works by Ketèlbey performed by different ensembles and conductors (including the composer) made between 1917 and 1939. Also music was used in "My Lady Heroine" by French singer Serge Gainsbourg.
