= Jeffrey Skidmore =

English conductor (born 1951)

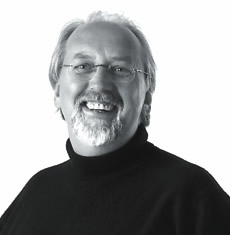
Jeffrey Skidmore

Jeffrey Skidmore OBE (born 27 February 1951) is the conductor and artistic director of Ex Cathedra, a choir and early music ensemble based in Birmingham, West Midlands, England. He has researched and performed choral works of the 16th to 18th centuries and worked with other musicologists to prepare new performing editions of French and Italian music.

== Early life and education ==
Jeffrey Skidmore was born in Birmingham, England, in 1951. He attended St. Heliers Road Sunday School in Northfield before 1962, when he went to Bournville Boys Technical School (later, Bournville Grammar-Technical School for Boys).

== Ex Cathedra ==
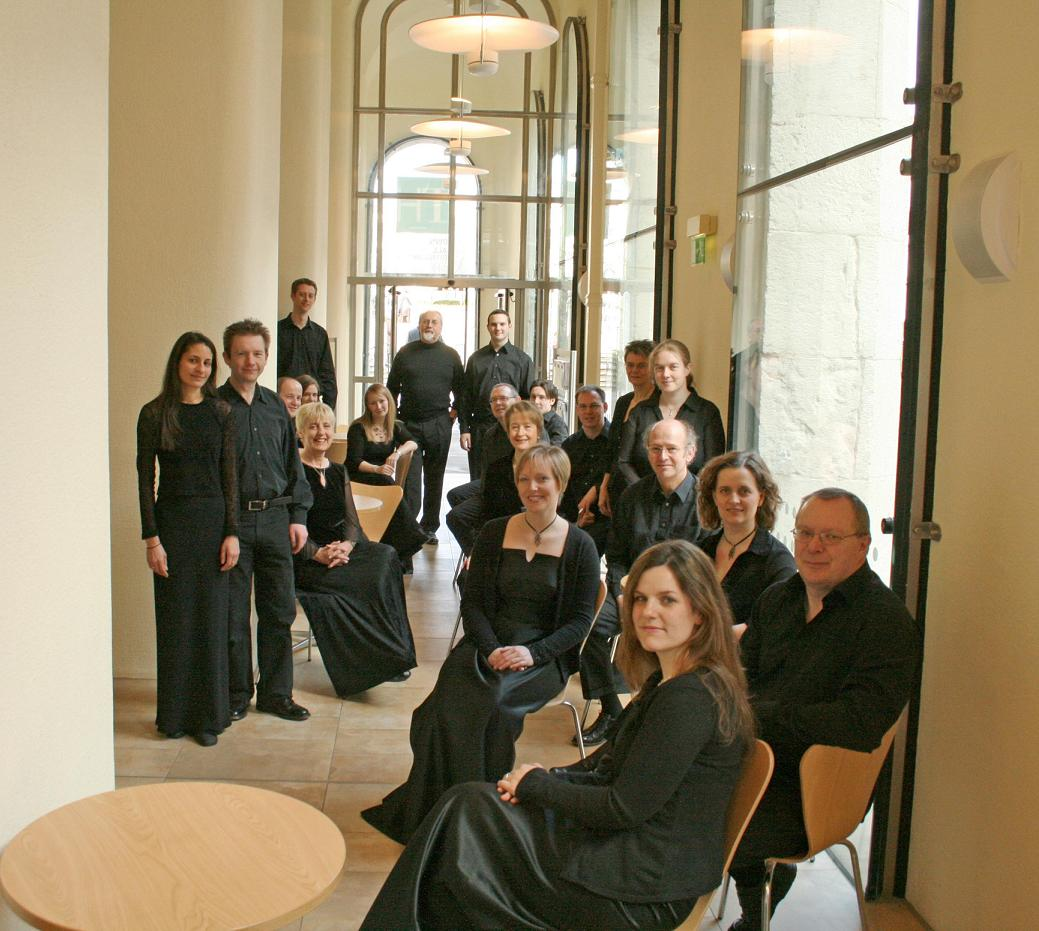
Skidmore (rear, in front of the door) with the Ex Cathedra choir in the café of the Birmingham Town Hall, 1 March 2008

Skidmore began conducting at school at 18 years old when he founded the Ex Cathedra choir in Birmingham in 1969. After Bournville, he went on to read music with David Wulstan at Magdalen College, Oxford, where he was a choral scholar under Bernard Rose. He then taught as a music school teacher in Birmingham, including at John Willmott School in Sutton Coldfield.

While directing the Ex Cathedra choir, and its associated Ex Cathedra Consort and Baroque Orchestra, Skidmore appeared in concert series and festivals across the UK and abroad, and has produced several recordings. He regularly conducts other ensembles such as the BBC Singers, the City of Birmingham Symphony Orchestra, and the Hanover Band. He and Ex Cathedra have commissioned over thirty new works and conducted many world premieres by composers including Sally Beamish, Fyfe Hutchins, Gabriel Jackson, John Joubert, James MacMillan, Alec Roth, Daryl Runswick, Peter Sculthorpe, Philip Sheppard, Peter Wiegold, and Roderick Williams.

In the field of opera, Skidmore worked with Marc Minkowski and David McVicar on the 2004 production of Eccles's Semele, at the Théâtre des Champs-Élysées in Paris, and conducted Cavalli's La Calisto, Purcell's Dido and Aeneas, and Rameau's Pigmalion at the Royal Birmingham Conservatoire. With Ex Cathedra, he gave the first performances in modern times of the French Baroque operas Zaïde, reine de Grenade ('Zaïde, Queen of Grenada') by Royer and Isis by Lully.

Skidmore was appointed Officer of the Order of the British Empire (OBE), in the 2015 New Year Honours, for services to choral music.

On 27 Jan 2026 Ex Cathedra announced that Skidmore would retire as Artistic Director in the autumn of 2027, continuing as Founder and Conductor Emeritus. James Burton will join Ex Cathedra as Artistic Director Designate in the spring of 2026.

== Contributions to musicology and musical education ==
A lecturer and honorary fellow at Royal Birmingham Conservatoire, and a research fellow at the University of Birmingham, he has worked with many musicologists to prepare new performing editions of French, Italian, and Spanish music by Giovanni Animuccia, Juan de Araujo, Marc-Antoine Charpentier, Michel Richard Delalande, Claudio Monteverdi, and Jean-Philippe Rameau.

Skidmore is Artistic Director of Early Music at Royal Birmingham Conservatoire and director of Ex Cathedra's education programme. He frequently gives choral training workshops and teaches at summer schools in the UK and overseas. He has regularly directed the choral programme at Dartington International Summer School and was Classical Music Programmer for the 2005 Kilkenny Arts Festival.

== See also ==
- Ex Cathedra
