= Lauren Zhang =

American pianist

- Born: December 2001 (age 23–24); Albuquerque, New Mexico
- Genres: Classical
- Instrument: Piano
- Years active: 2018–present
- Website: https://laurenzhang.com/

Lauren Zhang (born in December 2001) is an American-born pianist who won the BBC's Young Musician Contest in May 2018. In 2010, Zhang moved with her parents to Birmingham, United Kingdom, where she studied music at the junior department of Royal Birmingham Conservatoire while attending King Edward VI High School for Girls. She began studying at Harvard University in 2020. Zhang is currently a medical student at Columbia University Vagelos College of Physicians and Surgeons. She graduated from Harvard College in 2024, where she concentrated in Chemistry and did a secondary in applied mathematics.

== Biography ==
Born in Albuquerque, New Mexico, Lauren Zhang started to play the piano under Madeline Ignazito when she was four years old, and the violin under Terry Coulton at the age of six in Illinois. In 2010, when her family moved to England, Lauren Zhang joined the Junior Department at the Royal Birmingham Conservatoire and initially studied piano with Rebeca Omordia. Since 2011, she has been studying the piano under Dr Robert Markham who was a finalist at the Tchaikovsky International Competition in Moscow in 1994, and the piano class winner of the BBC Young Musician of the Year Competition in 1986. Zhang has also studied the violin at the Conservatoire under Sam Mason. In addition, Lauren Zhang has received advice and participated in masterclasses with Kenneth Hamilton, Lan Mi, Fabio Bidini, Peter Donohoe, Kalman Drafi, Philip Martin, Pascal Nemirovski, Menahem Pressler and John Thwaites. Lauren also receives guidance from Christopher Elton. She achieved her fellowship diploma in piano performance at the age of 13, having completed her licentiate diploma the year before. She also achieved her licentiate diploma in violin at the age of 12. Interested in chamber music, she plays in ensembles.

At the final of the Young Musician competition, Zhang played Prokofiev's Second Piano Concerto, accompanied by the City of Birmingham Symphony Orchestra conducted by Mark Wigglesworth. Commenting on her performance, the judging panel chair Kerry Andrew praised her "technical skill and intelligent musicality". The winner of the 2004 competition, and 2018 BBC Young Musician Ambassador, the violinist Nicola Benedetti, noted her "natural genuine musicianship" while Julian Lloyd Webber, head of Royal Birmingham Conservatoire, said: "Having spent a lifetime making music with some of the world’s finest musicians, I can honestly say that Lauren is up there with the best—she is a total phenomenon." Timothy English, who heads the Junior Conservatoire, commented: "Lauren has been a student at the Junior Conservatoire for the past eight years and it has been a great privilege to watch her develop into an extraordinary young pianist. She is a musician of exceptional talent and commitment, and this latest success is richly deserved."

In 2016, Lauren Zhang won the first prize at the 15th Ettlingen International Piano Competition for Young Pianists in Germany. Among other achievements, she was a prize winner at the Young Pianist of the North International Competition (2015) and the Wales International Piano Festival (2016), first prize winner in the EPTA-UK competition (18 and under (2016), 15 and under (2015), 12 and under (2013)), and first prize in the Emanuel Piano Trophy competition (2015).
