= Ex Cathedra =

British choir and early music ensemble

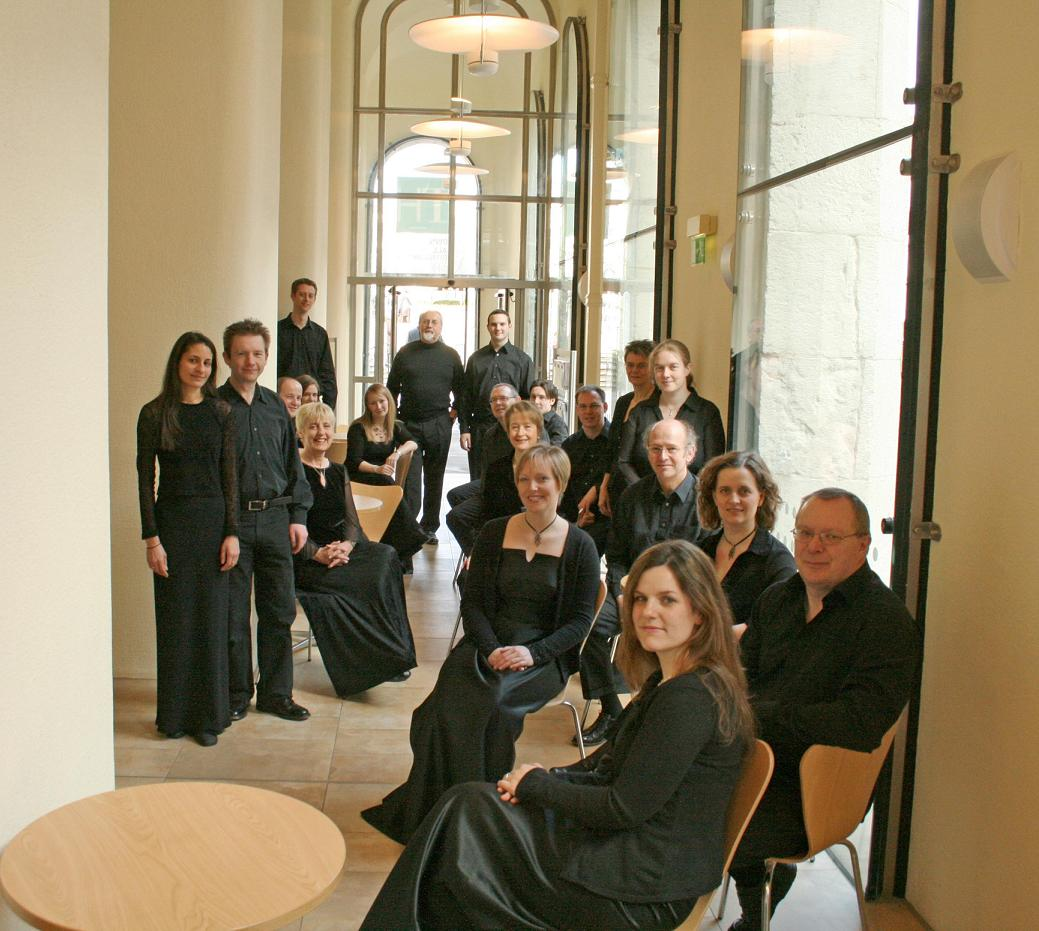
- Ex Cathedra in the foyer of Birmingham Town Hall, where it is an Associate Artist

Background information
- Origin: Birmingham, England
- Years active: 1969–present
- Labels: ASV Records; Hyperion Records; Own label
- Website: www.excathedra.co.uk

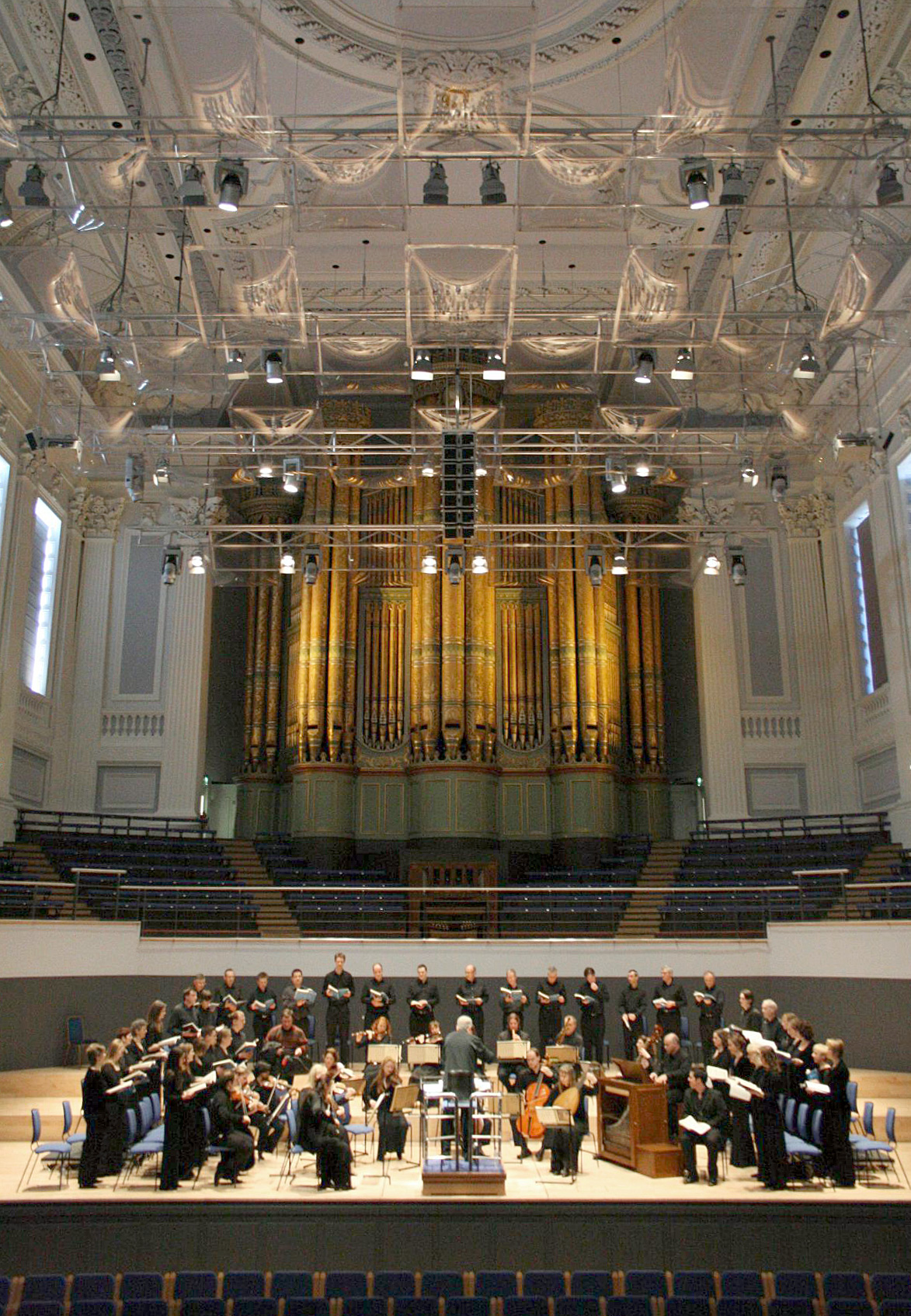
The Ex Cathedra Choir in performance at the Birmingham Town Hall – photographed on 1 March 2008

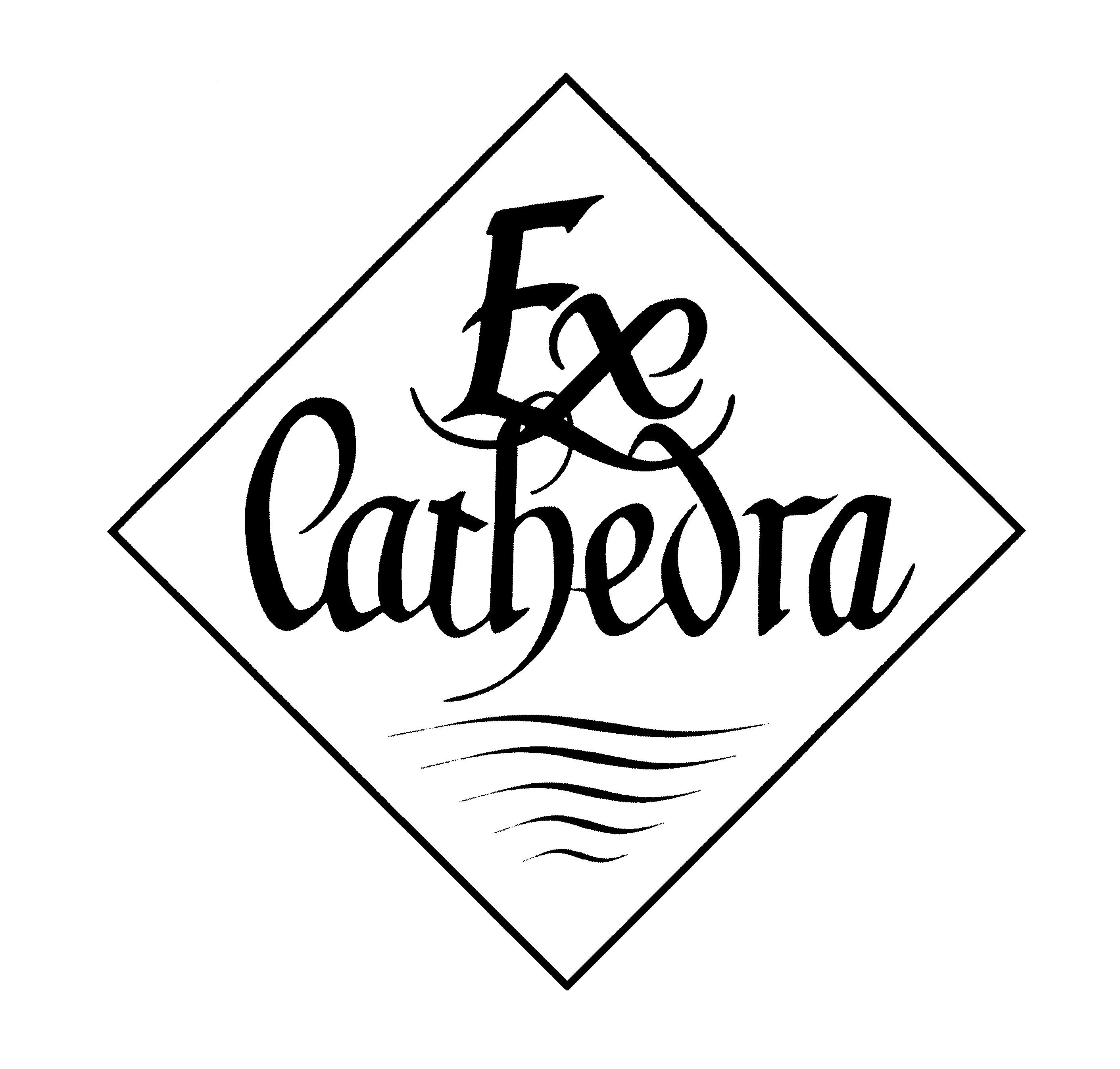
Ex Cathedra's logo

Ex Cathedra (/ˌɛks kəˈθeɪdrə/ EKS-kə-THAY-drə) is a British choir and early music ensemble based in Birmingham in the West Midlands, England. It performs choral music spanning the 15th to 21st centuries, and regularly commissions new works.

== History ==
Jeffrey Skidmore OBE founded Ex Cathedra in Birmingham in 1969, serving as its artistic director and conductor. It comprises a chamber choir of about 40 singers, a specialist vocal Consort made up of ten professional singers who feature regularly as soloists, and a Baroque ensemble/orchestra. The choir presents a season of programmes in various venues in and around Birmingham, across the Midlands and in London. It has been a resident ensemble at Birmingham Town Hall Symphony Hall since 2007. The first period instrument orchestra to be established in an English regional city, Ex Cathedra's Baroque Orchestra was founded as part of the choir's 1983–1984 season and made its début with a performance of Bach's Mass in B Minor. Comprising the UK's leading period instrumentalists, the orchestra's principals regularly give master classes and coach students at the Birmingham Conservatoire as part of its early music programme.. Since 2014, the ensemble has made regular appearances at Hereford Cathedral, St Peter's Collegiate Church in Wolverhampton, Southwell Minster and St James the Greater in Leicester.

Ex Cathedra has performed in concert series and festivals across the UK, including the BBC Proms where it performed Stockhausen in 2013, the Barbican Centre, Brighton Early Music Festival, Cheltenham Music Festival, Edinburgh International Festival, Kilkenny Festival, Lichfield Festival, London Festival of Baroque Music, Spitalfields Festival, St David's Festival, Three Choirs Festival and York Early Music Festival. The group has also appeared at festivals in Belgium, Finland, France, (Germany), Israel, Italy, Spain, and the United States.

Ex Cathedra has collaborated with Fretwork (music group), the City Musick, His Majestys Sagbutts & Cornetts, Concerto Palatino, Birmingham Opera Company, Sinfonia New York, Birmingham Royal Ballet, the City of Birmingham Symphony Orchestra, Quebecois dance company Cas Public, the Shakespeare Institute, and the Shakespeare Birthplace Trust.

Skidmore is scheduled to conclude his directorship of the ensemble at the close of the 2026-2027 season, and subsequently to take the title of Founder and Conductor Emeritus. In January 2026, the ensemble announced the appointment of James Burton as its next artistic director, effective with the 2027-2028 season. Burton is to take the title of artistic director-designate in the spring of 2026.

== Music education ==
Ex Cathedra has its own youth and children's choirs, the Academy of Vocal Music, for children aged 4–20. In 2017 it launched a Scholarships scheme for young professionals and, in partnership with Birmingham Conservatoire, a Student Scholarships scheme.

In addition, since 1990 the choir has been involved in education programmes in schools and local communities. It established Ring of Sound, an intergenerational choir for the Perry Common Regeneration Project and runs Singing Communities Ladywood, a community choir in the Ladywood inner city district of Birmingham.

Ex Cathedra's 'Singing Medicine' project has worked with children every week across all wards since 2004 at Birmingham Children's Hospital, at paediatric wards at Birmingham Heartland's Hospital since 2011, and at Birmingham Women's Hospital since 2016.

For over 25 years, Ex Cathedra has worked extensively in schools, particularly focusing on primary schools. This activity expanded during the 2007–2008 academic year, when Ex Cathedra inducted its 'Singing Playgrounds' project in schools in Birmingham, Coventry, Derby and London as part of the government's Sing Up initiative. By 2017, 'Singing Playgrounds' had reached over 600 schools across the UK and as far afield as Belgium, China, New Zealand, Singapore and Thailand.

== Recordings ==
Ex Cathedra has made a number of recordings for ASV Records, NMC, Orchid, Signum Records, Somm Records, Hyperion Records, and on its own label, with a particular focus on French and Latin American Baroque music. In 2015, the CD 'Britten to America' was shortlisted for a Grammy Award, whilst 'A French Baroque Diva' won a Gramophone Award 2015 (Recital category).

Title and CD number	Release date	Performers
Vivaldi: Vespers; ECCE EXCCD001	1991	Ex Cathedra Chamber Choir and Baroque Orchestra; Jeffrey Skidmore
Michel-Richard de Lalande: Regina Coeli; De Profundis; Cantate Domino; ASV Gaudeamus CD GAU 141	16 January 1995	Ex Cathedra Chamber Choir and Baroque Orchestra (leader Micaela Comberti); Jeffrey Skidmore
Sanctus: Baroque Music for the Nativity; ASV Gaudeamus CD GAU 166		Ex Cathedra Chamber Choir and Baroque Orchestra; Jeffrey Skidmore
Monteverdi: Madrigali Fatta Spirituale; ASV Gaudeamus CD GAU 174	[Unknown]	Ex Cathedra; Jeffrey Skidmore
Sir Christèmas: Carols Old and New; ASV Gaudeamus CD DCA 912	21 February 1995	Ex Cathedra; Jeffrey Skidmore
Orlande de Lassus: Sacred Choral Music; Missa ad Imitationem Vinum Bonum; ASV Gaudeamus CD GAU 150	13 March 1996	Ex Cathedra; His Majesty's Sagbutts and Cornetts; Jeffrey Skidmore
A New Heaven: 1,000 Years of Sacred Choral Music; ECCE EXCCD002	2000	Ex Cathedra; Jeffrey Skidmore
Christmas Music by Candlelight: Alleluya, a New Work; ECCE EXCCD003	2001	Ex Cathedra; Jeffrey Skidmore
New World Symphonies: Baroque Music from Latin America; Hyperion CDA67380	7 April 2003	Ex Cathedra; Jeffrey Skidmore
Charpentier: Messe à Quatre Chœurs; Salve Regina à Trois Chœurs; Salut de la Veille des 'O'; Le Reniement de St Pierre; Hyperion CDA67435	5 January 2004	Ex Cathedra; Jeffrey Skidmore
Rameau: Règne Amour: Love Songs from the Operas; Hyperion CDA67447	3 May 2004	Carolyn Sampson; Ex Cathedra Choir & Baroque Orchestra; Jeffrey Skidmore
Peerson: Latin Motets; Hyperion CDA67490	3 January 2005	Ex Cathedra Consort; Jeffrey Skidmore
Moon, Sun & All Things: Baroque Music from Latin America – 2 Hyperion CDA67524	29 August 2005	Ex Cathedra; Jeffrey Skidmore
Fire Burning in Snow: Latin American Baroque 3 Hyperion CDA67600	28 January 2008	Ex Cathedra Consort; Jeffrey Skidmore
J.S Bach: St Matthew Passion; Orchid ORC100007	1 November 2009	Ex Cathedra; Jeffrey Skidmore; Grace Davidson – Soprano I Mark Chambers – Alto I Jeremy Budd – Tenor I & Evangelist; Eamonn Dougan – Bass I & Jesus; Greg Skidmore – Bass I & Pilate; Natalie Clifton-Griffith – Soprano II; Matthew Venner – Alto II; Christopher Watson – Tenor II; James Birchall – Bass II
Joy in the morning Orchid ORC100008	1 November 2009	Ex Cathedra; Jeffrey Skidmore; Andrew Fletcher – organ
Orlande de Lassus: St Matthew Passion; SOMMCD0106	1 April 2011	Ex Cathedra Consort; Jeffrey Skidmore; Nicholas Mulroy – Evangelist; Greg Skidmore – Jesus
Alec Roth: Shared Ground; Signum SIGCD270	1 November 2011	Ex Cathedra; Ex Cathedra Academy of Vocal Music; Jeffrey Skidmore; Philippe Honoré – violin
Giovanni Gabrieli: Sacred Symphonies; Hyperion CDA67957	1 November 2012	Ex Cathedra Consort; His Majestys Sagbutts & Cornetts; Concerto Palatino; Jeffrey Skidmore
Benjamin Britten: Britten to America; NMC D190	9 November 2013	Ex Cathedra Consort; Jeffrey Skidmore; The Hallé; Mark Elder; Andrew Kennedy; Huw Watkins; Samuel West
A French Baroque Diva; Hyperion CDA68035	1 June 2014	Carolyn Sampson; Ex Cathedra Consort & Baroque Orchestra; Jeffrey Skidmore
Brazilian Adventures; Hyperion CDA68114	1 November 2015	Ex Cathedra Consort & Baroque Orchestra; Jeffrey Skidmore
Alec Roth: A Time to Dance; Hyperion CDA68144	1 February 2016	Ex Cathedra Choir & Baroque Orchestra; Jeffrey Skidmore; Grace Davidson – soprano Matthew Venner – alto Samuel Boden – tenor Greg Skidmore – bass Tim Harper – organ
Roxanna Panufnik: Celestial Bird; Signum SIGCD543	1 September 2018	Ex Cathedra; Milapfest; Jeffrey Skidmore
Penelope Thwaites: From Five Continents; SOMMCD0612	1 April 2020	Ex Cathedra; Jeffrey Skidmore; Carolyn Sampson - soprano James Gilchrist - tenor William Dazeley - baritone Penelope Thwaites - piano Rupert Jeffcoat - organ

=== Hyperion lawsuit ===
In 2001, Ex Cathedra recorded four works by Michel-Richard de Lalande for Hyperion Records. The sessions used editions prepared by scholar Lionel Sawkins. Sawkins subsequently sued Hyperion for royalties arising from his claimed copyright in the editions. The recording was issued but subsequently withdrawn from the market after Sawkins won the lawsuit and subsequent appeal.

Upon Hyperion's appeal, the Court of Appeal held on 19 May 2005 that Sawkins owned the copyright in his modern performing editions of the de Lalande music, even though de Lalande's music itself was out of copyright. The decision received criticism, such as from Peter Phillips, the director of the Tallis Scholars and himself a music editor:

"All the music I perform has to be edited, or we couldn't read it. But copyright should be there ... to reward creativity, not scholarship or diligence. How much an editor did or did not write should never be asked and judged upon during a million-pound lawsuit involving a small and innovative recording company."

Following the death of Sawkins in September 2025, Hyperion has restored this recording to download and CDR availability.

== See also ==
- Arts in Birmingham – classical music
- Jeffrey Skidmore
- List of early music ensembles
