= David Sulkin =

English theatre and opera director (born 1949)

David Charles Sulkin
- Born: 1 June 1949 (age 77); West Sussex, United Kingdom
- Education: Guildhall School of Music and Drama; Rose Bruford College
- Occupations: Theatre director; actor

David Charles Chester Sulkin OBE (born 1 January 1949 in West Sussex) is an English theatre and opera director and currently director of artist development at the National Opera Studio. In 2017 Sulkin received a Finzi Scholarship to work in Brno, Czech Republic, to complete work on a play about Leoš Janáček and the composer’s relationship with his wife and other women: My Life with Janáček [working title]. This is now being developed into a film script.

== Biography ==
Sulkin is the younger son of Emmanuel and Dorothy Sulkin. He was born and grew up in Worthing, West Sussex, and decided to be an actor at the age of 8 when he saw his first professional play at the Connaught Theatre. His grandparents on his father's side were Jewish immigrants from Poland arriving in London in 1904.

Sulkin studied drama at the Guildhall School of Music and Drama and at Rose Bruford College (RBC), and graduated in 1973. Since then he has worked as an actor, theatre and opera director and producer. He has taught at RADA, RBC and the Royal College of Music. He has held executive roles in three music charities – National Foundation for Youth Music, Help Musicians UK and the National Opera Studio. He was appointed Officer of the Order of the British Empire (OBE) in HM The Queen's 2014 New Year Honours for his work in the arts, education and charity.

== Early career ==
=== 1975–1984: Actor, director, workshop leader and community activist ===
After working on contract at the Donovan Maule Theatre in Nairobi, Kenya, and for the Bolshoi Ballet in London, Sulkin became one of the co-founders of the Hoxton Theatre Trust [1975] where he was a resident actor, director, workshop leader and community activist. In 1980, he became director of the Young People's Theatre and the Young Writers' Festival at the Royal Court Theatre working with Max Stafford-Clark. While at the Royal Court, Sulkin received an Anglo-Soviet Study Scholarship to investigate the impact of the long-established national network of Theatres of the Young Spectator across Russia [1983]. He helped start the International Festival of Young Playwrights in Australia [1985] and was the co-founder of the Baylis Programme at English National Opera working with Rebecca Meitlis and the international opera director, David Pountney [1985].

=== 1986–1997: Opera director ===
In 1987, the Baylis Programme commissioned him to write and direct Gretel and Hansel, an opera with music by Alec Roth for young people to perform, based on the opera Hansel and Gretel by Engelbert Humperdinck and the fairy tale by the Brothers Grimm. While at ENO Sulkin began working extensively in the Czech Republic and became associate director of Janáčkovy Hukvaldy – the Janáček Festival where he directed Janáček's Liška Bystrouška (The Cunning Little Vixen), Benjamin Britten's Archa Noemova (Noye's Fludde) in collaboration with the Britten Pears Foundation, Zakladní škola, Hukvaldy and the Department of Alternative Theatre and Puppetry at DAMU, Prague. He later produced Hans Krasa's opera Brundibar. He worked at the National Theatre of Prague directing Ilja Hurník's opera Dama i Lupiči [completed 1966] based on the Ealing comedy of 1955, The Ladykillers. He also directed Pozvání pana sloana (Entertaining Mr Sloane) at the Činoherni Studio, Ustí nad Labem. In 2006 Sulkin directed Dame Ethel Smyth's opera The Wreckers at the Hall for Cornwall to mark the centenary of Smyth's completion of the work. The 2006 production was the first in Cornwall where the opera is set.

== Later career ==
In 1999, Sulkin became the director of policy and programmes at the National Foundation for Youth Music, supporting young people who would not normally have access to music training. Genres included, among many, rock, jazz, hip-hop, folk, and classical music. In 2008 Sulkin was invited to become executive director of Help Musicians UK, which provides a wide range of services for musicians, helps talented young artists get a foot on the ladder of success. A major achievement of his time at Help Musicians UK was the change of the charity's name from the Musicians Benevolent Fund to Help Musicians UK in 2014. Help Musicians is 100 years old in January 2021. He continues to maintain his acting, directing and writing work.

== Personal interests ==
Sulkin speaks some Czech and is studying Russian again after a long break. His personal interests include cooking and especially bread-making; motorcycling, early gramophones and acoustic recordings.

Voluntary roles. Sulkin has held numerous voluntary roles, which have included being a governor and chair of the Cripplegate Foundation, a trustee of the De La Warr Pavilion, Bexhill-on-Sea, a trustee of the Association of Charitable Organisations, a trustee of Nuance Music, trustee and chair of the Hastings and East Sussex Creative Partnership and a trustee of Theatre Centre. He served as the founding Chair of Trustees of the Sing Up Foundation, the charitable arm of Sing Up focused on singing for children and young people's mental health and wellbeing, from its establishment in 2017. He was chair of the New London Children's Choir and, for seventeen years, chair of governors of Clerkenwell Parochial Church of England Primary School in London.

In November 2020, Sulkin was invited to advise the National Theatre (Prague) (Národní Divadlo) in Prague, Czech Republic, to create a new department for learning and participation for the opera ensemble.

== Publications ==
Sulkin edited two collections of plays (1983 and 1984) by young writers as part of the Royal Court Young People's Theatre. Entitled Young Writers and Primary Sauce, they were plays mainly by primary school children.

As the result of an Anglo Soviet Scholarship, he wrote a report called Young People's Theatre in the Soviet Union. An abstract was published in Drama – The Quarterly Theatre Review (1988. Vol. 1) under the title Russian Youth Theatre. Times Educational Supplement also published Sulkin's article entitled "Art of the State" (23 October 1987).

Amongst his publications are New Old – Thirty Thousand Years of Experience (1999) with Katrina Duncan. This was a research project and report which makes recommendations about how artists might develop their careers after the age of 50 and what people who have had other working lives, but have creative urges, do to become fulfilled artists after 50. This report was published by SEA and funded by the De Hahn family [Saga].

In 2000, Sulkin contributed to Reflections on the Rose Bruford College (2000) by Robert Ely, ISBN 1-903-454-00-X and using his pseudonym, Dave Chester, he wrote a short story, Immigrant, published in a collection of stories called Rough Stuff (Alyson Books, 2000). ISBN 1 55583 520 1. The editors were Simon Sheppard and M. Christian.

In 2005, Sulkin acted as editor for the Singbook – Twelve Songs Worth Singing for Youth Music, published by Faber Music and supported by NASUWT and Arts Council England. ISBN 0-571-52398-6.

In 2012, Sulkin edited a facsimile edition of the 1927 book The New River Head by G F Stringer, to celebrate the 40th anniversary of the Amwell Society. An article in the Journal of the Islington Archaeology & History Society Summer 2012 Vol 2, No 2 describe the preservation of the New River Head site.

Sulkin contributed a section entitled Salomon Gruschka and candles to Traces of Jewish Presence in Prague 2 by Martin Šmok and a team of authors published by the City of Prague 2 in 2015.

Sulkin features in Nicholas Holden's academic thesis for the University of Lincoln (2018) Building the Engine Room: A Study of the Royal Court Young Peoples’ Theatre and its Development into the Young Writers’ Programme.

Sulkin has produced a film for the National Opera Studio which was released on 17 November 2020. The director is Alisdair Kitchen. 12:42 traces the course of commissioning new opera works during the time of total quarantine caused by the Coronavirus.
