= Sulkin =

Sulkin is a surname. Notable people with the surname include:

- Alec Sulkin (born 1973), American animation writer and producer
- David Sulkin (born 1949), English theatre and opera director
- Gregg Sulkin (born 1992), British actor
