= Darren Henley =

Chief Executive of Arts Council England (born 1973)

Darren Richard Henley (born February 1973) is the Chief Executive of Arts Council England and an author of books about the arts. He is a member of the UK government's Creative Industries Council.

== Education ==
He attended St Edmund's School Canterbury, and is a graduate of the University of Hull (BA Hons, politics), the University of South Wales (MSc, management), the University of Buckingham (MA, history of art), Middlesex University (DProf professional doctorate examining the role of the outsider as an agent for change), Buckinghamshire New University (MSc, applied positive psychology) and Henley Business School (PGCert, coaching and behavioural change). He holds an FLCM fellowship diploma from the London College of Music at the University of West London.

== Career ==
Between 1989 and 1994, he worked as a freelance radio journalist for stations including Invicta FM, LBC, and Classic FM (UK), first working for Classic FM in 1992 as a weekend and overnight newsreader before becoming programme editor of the station's Classic Newsnight programme in 1995. He was made News Manager in 1996, Programme Manager in 1999, Managing Editor in 2000, Station Manager in 2004 and Managing Director in 2006. In 2014, he was announced as the new Chief Executive of Arts Council England, succeeding Alan Davey.

In this post, in 2022 he presided over his organisation's funding cuts to established arts companies - notably the removal of English National Opera from the national portfolio of funded organisations - and caused further furore in the operatic world by suggesting that operatic performance in England and Wales needed to move away from theatres, as "A new generation of audiences is embracing opera and music theatre presented in new ways: opera in car parks, opera in pubs, opera on your tablet".

The cuts of £50m centred on London and included long-established producers of new writing, Stockroom, the Donmar Theatre and the Hampstead Theatre.

== Government reviews ==
In 2011, he undertook an independent review of the funding and delivery of music education in England for the Department for Education and the Department for Culture, Media and Sport of the UK government. The following year, he authored an independent review of cultural education in England for the same two government departments. He was a member of the Scottish Government's Instrumental Music Group, which published a report into instrumental music tuition in Scotland in 2013.

== Music and cultural education ==
From 2007 to 2010, he chaired the Music Manifesto Partnership and Advocacy Group, set up by Education Minister Andrew Adonis as part of a government-backed campaign to improve young people's music education in England. From 2013 to 2015, he co-chaired the government's Cultural Education Board, first with Schools Minister Liz Truss MP and Culture Minister Ed Vaizey MP and then with Nick Gibb MP and Ed Vaizey MP. His other arts related roles have included Chair of the Mayor of London's Music Education Task Force, Patron of the Mayor of London's Fund for Young Musicians, member of the governing body of the Associated Board of the Royal Schools of Music, trustee and Vice-President of the Canterbury Festival and Commissioner on the University of Warwick's Commission on the Future of Cultural Value.

== Books ==
Henley has written or co-written thirty books on arts related subjects, including the Sunday Times bestselling Everything You Ever Wanted To Know About Classical Music...But Were Too Afraid To Ask and an official history of the Royal Liverpool Philharmonic Orchestra. He is the co-author of The Virtuous Circle: Why Creativity and Cultural Education Count and the author of The Arts Dividend: Why Investment in Culture Pays and Creativity: Why It Matters.

== Honours and awards ==
Henley's audiobook for children The Story of Classical Music was nominated for a Grammy Award in 2005. He was a Finalist in the Station Programmer category at the Sony Radio Academy Awards in 2008 and was named Commercial Radio Programmer of the Year at the Arqiva Commercial Radio Awards in 2009, having been nominated in the same category in 2007. Classic FM won the UK Station of the Year Category at the Sony Radio Academy Awards in 2007, the Music Programming Gold Award in 2009, a Special Award to mark the station's 20th anniversary in 2012 and the inaugural UK Radio Brand of the Year Gold Award in 2013. At the Arqiva Commercial Radio Awards, Classic FM was named Station of the Year in the TSA 1 million+ category in 2011, while Henley and Classic FM jointly won the Arqiva Gold Award in 2012. The station also won a Classic BRIT Award in 2012 and a Royal Philharmonic Society Award in 2013. Henley was appointed a Fellow of the Royal Society of Arts in 1998, a Companion of the Chartered Management Institute in 2009, an Honorary Fellow of Canterbury Christ Church University in 2010, an Honorary Fellow of Trinity Laban Conservatoire of Music and Dance in 2011, a Fellow of the Radio Academy in 2011, an Honorary Member of the Royal Northern College of Music in 2012, an Honorary Member of the Incorporated Society of Musicians in 2013, an Honorary Fellow of Liverpool John Moores University in 2014, an honorary fellow of the Guildhall School of Music and Drama in 2015, an honorary member of the Royal College of Music in 2016, a companion of the Liverpool Institute for Performing Arts in 2016 and an honorary fellow of Arts University Bournemouth in 2017. He holds honorary doctorates from the University of Hull, Birmingham City University, Buckinghamshire New University, the University of the Arts London, York St John University, the University of Sunderland and Manchester Metropolitan University and an honorary MA from the University for the Creative Arts. He was awarded the Sir Charles Groves Prize for "his outstanding contribution to British music" in 2013 and the President's Medal by the British Academy for the humanities and social sciences in 2015 for "his contributions to music education, music research, and the arts".

He was appointed Officer of the Order of the British Empire (OBE) in the 2013 New Year Honours for services to music and Commander of the Order of the British Empire (CBE) in the 2022 Birthday Honours for services to the arts.
