= PureSolo =

- Website type: Music recording
- Available in: English
- Website: www.puresolo.com
- Commercial: Yes
- Registration: free
- Launched: 2008
- Current status: Active

PureSolo is an application creation company specialising in music and vocal recording technology for a range of mobile devices.

Once users download their chosen PureSolo app from their preferred store, they gain access to a catalogue containing thousands of professionally produced backing tracks and accompaniments. Once a track has been selected, users can record their performance using the app's own built-in recorder.

Once completed, a recording can then be exported to social and video networks such as YouTube, Facebook and Twitter. User profiles can also be created on PureSolo apps where members can upload a photo, share feedback, follow favourite artists and promote their tracks.

The current catalogue contains recordable versions of songs for karaoke, guitar, and accompaniment. With 35 different genres of music, from rock and hip hop through to jazz and Classical, there is a wide variety of tracks to choose from for over 20 different instruments.

== Licensing ==
Through licensing agreements with music publishers including EMI, Universal, Warner/Chappell, and Sony/ATV and collecting societies including the PRS, PureSolo is the only website which provides this recording service legally.

== Competitions ==
PureSolo has teamed up with artists including David Guetta, Mark Knopfler, Westlife, P!nk, The Saturdays and JLS, to hold competitions where users can upload their own versions of songs to win prizes such as attending concerts and meeting the artist(s).

PureSolo also launched the original online X Factor Karaoke site in 2009 in an exclusive deal with the X Factor, and has run competitions with Jazz FM featuring some UK jazz artists including Snake Davis, Dennis Rollins and Steve Waterman.

== Educational partnerships ==
The ABRSM platform enables instrumentalists to record musical pieces from the ABRSM (Associated Board of the Royal Schools of Music) examination syllabus using the PureSolo app. PureSolo also offers content and discounts for schools through the Education Platform.

PureSolo has also formed a partnership with the UK government's Sing Up campaign. Sing Up is a not-for-profit organisation promoting singing in the classroom. The resource, in the form of backing tracks, lyrics and accompanying notes, provides teachers the means to encourage students to get involved with singing songs from the new UK songbook. At the end of January 2010, they added a new ‘Sing & Share’ functionality which enables individual pupils, classrooms or whole schools to record and share their efforts. This functionality is powered and hosted by PureSolo.

== History ==
PureSolo was founded by former Goldman Sachs partner David Kaplan and UK session musician John Thirkell. Thirkell has had a career as a trumpet player, playing on songs by artists such as David Bowie, Jamiroquai, George Michael and Tina Turner, added to live performances with Phil Collins, Eric Clapton and Bon Jovi along with many others. PureSolo's Beta launch took place in October 2008.
