= Sing Up Foundation =

UK registered charity

- Founded: 2017
- Type: Registered charity
- Location: United Kingdom
- Key people: Michelle James (CEO, Sing Up), Celi Barberia and Baz Chapman (Joint Heads of Foundation), Dr Jeremy Sleith (Chair of Trustees)
- Website: singupfoundation.org

Sing Up Foundation is a UK registered charity (no. 1172438) focused on singing for children and young people's mental health and wellbeing. It is the charitable arm of Sing Up, an education organisation that provides singing resources, training and guidance to schools. The Foundation develops research, resources, podcasts and events for practitioners working with children and young people, and since 2021 has led the international legacy of the British Council's World Voice singing programme.

== Background ==
Sing Up began as the National Singing Programme, a government-funded initiative established in 2007 by the Department for Education with the aim of reversing a decline in singing in English primary schools. The programme was delivered by a consortium led by Youth Music, with Faber Music, The Sage Gateshead and advertising agency Abbott Mead Vickers. By 2012, when government funding ended, the programme had engaged around 98% of primary schools in England. Sing Up subsequently became independent, sustaining itself through earned income from school membership subscriptions.

== History ==
To mark the 10th anniversary of the National Singing Programme's launch, Sing Up established the Sing Up Foundation in 2017 as a dedicated charitable entity focused on singing for health and wellbeing, to expand the organisation's work.

The Foundation's first Chair of Trustees was David Sulkin OBE, who had previously led Youth Music's advocacy for singing in primary schools. In January 2023, Dr Jeremy Sleith was appointed as the next Chair of Trustees, having served as a trustee since 2020. At the time of his appointment, Sleith was Head of St Helens Music Service; he subsequently became Head of Bury Music Ltd.

=== Board of Trustees ===
In 2021, three new trustees joined the Foundation's board: Dr Andrew McWilliams, a child and adolescent psychiatrist and researcher with experience studying the impact of arts and health interventions; Sleith, who had over 30 years of experience working with young people and music practitioners across music organisations and hubs; and Dr Motje Wolf, a Senior Lecturer in Education at De Montfort University and a member of the steering committee of 'Singing in Music Education' within the European Association of Music in Schools. The board also includes Michelle James, Chief Executive of Sing Up and author of The Singing School Handbook (Faber Music, 2018), and Beth Millett, Publishing Manager at Sing Up, reflecting the Foundation's structural relationship with its sister organisation.

In September 2024, six further trustees were appointed to the Foundation board: Vernon Fuller, a musician, community singing facilitator and mental health and wellbeing tutor; Sarah-Jane Gibson, an ethnomusicologist and Music Lecturer at York St John University; Beth Ismay, Learning Programmes Manager at the National Youth Jazz Orchestra; Becky Kingsnorth, assistant director of Primary Care Strategy at NHS North Central London Integrated Care Board; Rhona Miller, an Associate Assistant Head Teacher at Addington School with experience in music and special education for young people with learning disabilities; and Zeny Zerfu, a teacher and trainer who has worked with the British Council in Ethiopia as a World Voice Master Trainer.

== Work and programmes ==
The Foundation's work spans international singing programmes, original research into singing and mental health, practitioner resources, and broadcasting. In 2019, the BBC cited the Foundation as an authority on singing and wellbeing as part of BBC Music Day, a national campaign in which 1,500 schools and over 300,000 children took part in singing activities. In 2020, Joint Head Celi Barberia was interviewed by Welsh National Opera for their podcast The O Word, discussing the health and wellbeing benefits of singing for children and young people.

=== World Voice ===
In 2021, the Sing Up Foundation took on responsibility for continuing the legacy of the British Council's World Voice programme, which had run from 2013 to 2020. Developed by Artistic Director Richard Frostick, World Voice trained teachers in 23 countries to use singing as a tool for classroom learning, with projects adapted to support language learning, cultural awareness and work with children in refugee settings. Over seven years, the programme reached 1.55 million children and involved over 12,000 teachers.

An independent evaluation of the programme was commissioned by the British Council in January 2020 and carried out by Sound Connections, a London-based music education organisation. Published in 2023, the evaluation examined the programme's impact in Colombia, Ethiopia, Greece, Nepal and Palestine and informed the handover of World Voice resources to the Sing Up Foundation for further development.

The Sing Up Foundation makes World Voice training materials, the World Voice Teacher's Handbook and a World Voice Songbook of songs from participating countries freely available, and has developed new projects building on the programme's work with refugee and displaced communities.

=== Research into singing and refugees ===
In 2024, the Foundation published a report titled Then the dream started to be more: Singing and Music-Making with Refugee Children and Unaccompanied Minors: Insights From Research and Practice. The research was supported by a British Council grant to continue the legacy of the World Voice programme. Commissioned from a team led by Dr Hala Jaber, with Dr Fran Garry and Professor Helen Phelan from the University of Limerick's Irish World Academy of Music and Dance, the report drew on a literature review and interviews with organisations including Fairbeats, Music Action International, SurreyArts and Together Productions, as well as international partners from the British Council's World Voice project.

The research identified four thematic areas in the literature: challenges faced by refugee and migrant young people; the role of singing and music in social bonding; overcoming language barriers; and the creation of safe and inclusive musical spaces. Interview participants reported that participation helped children to feel free, valued and safe, and highlighted the importance of appropriate training and psychological support for facilitators working in these settings.

Building on the report's recommendations, the Foundation developed an action research project, Chorus of Hope, to create and disseminate an evidence-based model for vocal work with young refugees and unaccompanied minors in the UK and beyond.

=== Publications ===
In May 2026, the Foundation published Being Seen, Being Heard, Feeling Connected, a report examining how singing and vocal work can support young people's mental health. Drawing on over 50 sources including practitioner insights, case studies and young people's lived experiences, the report argued that many mental health challenges among young people are rooted in disconnection, and introduced Connection Theory, a framework mapping how singing can restore connection across emotional, social and physiological dimensions. The report also proposed the DO, KNOW, BE practitioner framework, addressing the musical skills, mental health knowledge and relational capacity required of practitioners in this area. It positioned singing not as a replacement for clinical services, but as a complementary approach, and called for greater investment in training, infrastructure and research to support its use as part of a broader mental health response.

The publication was launched during Mental Health Awareness Week 2026 with a webinar and panel discussion featuring Professor Graham Welch of the UCL Institute of Education, Benjamin Turner of Rap Club, and Baz Chapman, facilitated by Katherine Zeserson, Chair of Sing Up.

=== Inspiring Voices podcast ===
In September 2023, the Foundation launched Inspiring Voices, a podcast examining the role of singing, songwriting and creative music-making in children and young people's mental health and wellbeing. The first series, hosted by Baz Chapman, Joint Head of Foundation, featured nine episodes and was funded through Arts Council England's Cultural Recovery Fund. Guests in the first series included Professor Graham Welch, Chair of Music Education at University College London and Shlomo (beatboxer).

A second series followed, co-hosted by Chapman and Barberia with episodes exploring racism and cultural barriers in music, neurodivergence, and young people's experiences of creative music-making for wellbeing. Across both series, topics have covered many themes including singing with disabled young people, care-experienced children, neurodivergent young people, young refugees and those with long-term health conditions. Guests across both series have included Daisy Fancourt, Professor of Psychobiology and Epidemiology at University College London; Howard Goodall CBE, composer and broadcaster; and BAFTA award-winning vocal coaches and broadcasters David Grant MBE and Carrie Grant MBE.

=== Conferences and broadcasting ===
In May 2023, the Sing Up Foundation co-organised a two-day online conference titled Singing for Mental Health and Wellbeing: Spotlight on Children and Young People, in partnership with the Singing for Health Network and Music for Good. The conference brought together researchers and practitioners in singing and health to address the mental health and wellbeing of children and young people, and was aimed at students, researchers, educators, healthcare professionals and singing practitioners.

In 2024, Chapman and Barberia appeared as guests on the Singing Teachers Talk podcast, produced by the British Academy of Singing Teachers (BAST), discussing the role of singing in children's mental health and wellbeing.

From December 2025, the Foundation became a contributing partner to Music Teacher magazine's health and wellbeing column, with Chapman writing on the role of connection in singing for children's mental health and wellbeing.

In February 2026, Chapman appeared on BBC Radio 4's Woman's Hour to discuss the role of singing in young people's mental health and wellbeing, the barriers young people face in maintaining access to singing during adolescence, and the Foundation's work with displaced young people.

The Foundation has also been cited as an authority on singing and children's wellbeing by regional and national press, including The Week Junior and the South West Londoner.

== See also ==
- Sing Up
- Music education in the United Kingdom
- Arts Council England
- British Council
- David Sulkin
- Department for Education
- National Youth Jazz Orchestra
- Daisy Fancourt
- Howard Goodall
- David Grant (singer)
- Carrie Grant
