= Gwynne Kimpton =

English musician and conductor (1873-1930)

Edith Gwynne Kimpton (1873 – 26 November 1930) was a pioneering woman conductor and founder of many orchestras, including the British Women's Symphony Orchestra in 1923.

== Early career ==
Kimpton was of Welsh parentage. She attended the Guildhall School of Music and the Royal Academy of Music, studying violin with Alfred Gibson (1849-1924), and began her professional career as a violinist. She was for many years the leader of the orchestra at Bow and Bromley, which she first conducted in 1893. There was an associated choir at Bow and Bromley, conducted by William McNaught. She also taught music at Bromley High School for Girls in the 1890s. Kimpton founded the Strings Club in 1902 to further string quartet playing, and organised and played in many string quartet concerts in Bromley between 1906 and 1914.

From January to June 1911 Kimpton was the conductor of the Orchestral Concerts for Young People series of five concerts and short lectures held at the Steinway Hall, the first concerts to be given for children in London. At this pre-war period she set up various orchestras and conducted them, including an orchestra at Chislehurst (which evolved into the Bromley and Chislehurst Orchestra), and a professional London orchestra using women members of the London Symphony and Queen's Hall orchestras. During the war she formed the London Amateur Orchestra. In 1917 she co-founded (alongside fellow Bromley teacher Beatrice Fowle) the Bromley Symphony Orchestra.

== British Women's Symphony Orchestra ==
The 80-strong British Women's Symphony Orchestra was founded by Kimpton in 1923. Its inaugural concert took place at the Queen's Hall on 3 April 1924 and featured contralto Lady Maud Warrender (1870-1945) and the cellist Beatrice Harrison. Half the works in the concert were by women composers, and Dame Ethel Smyth was there to give a speech and conduct her piece On the Cliffs of Cornwall. Kimpton conducted several more concerts with the orchestra, including the first performance of Germaine Tailleferre's Piano Concerto No. 1 in London on 3 December 1924 with Alfred Cortot as the soloist. But her long-standing ill-health soon led her to withdraw. Subsequent conductors included Adrian Boult (who on 4 May 1927 conducted the first performance of Gerald Finzi's Violin Concerto with soloist Sybil Eaton), the young Malcolm Sargent, Alec Sherman, Susan Spain-Dunk and (from 1933) Grace Burrows. The orchestra was filmed by Pathé News in 1934 with Burrows conducting.

== Death ==
Gwynne Kimpton's health issues continued, and she largely withdrew from public life during her final three years. She died following surgery in November 1930, aged 57.
