= Henry Fairs =

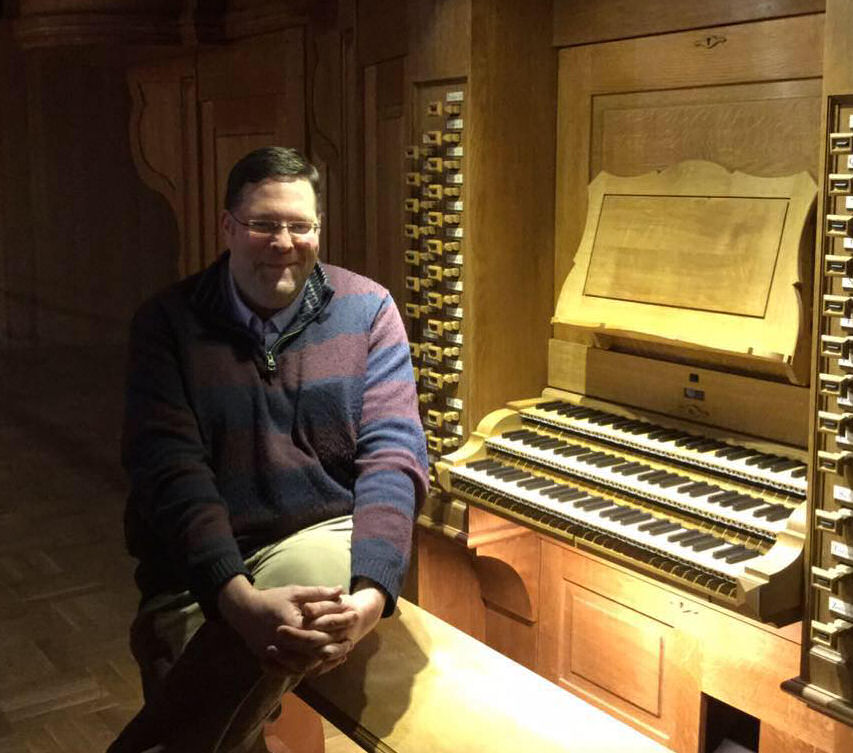
- Henry Fairs

Background information
- Born: 1976 (age 49–50); Hereford, England
- Occupation: Lecturer
- Instrument: Organ
- Label: Naxos
- Website: www.henryfairs.com

Henry Fairs (born 1976) is an English organist. He is organist to the University of Birmingham and Head of Organ Studies at the Birmingham Conservatoire. Since winning the Odense International Organ Competition, his concert career has taken him to the major European centres of organ music and to America, performing solo recitals and concertos on both historic and modern instruments.

== Biography ==
Born in Hereford, England, he received his earliest musical education as a chorister at Leominster Priory and studied at the Birmingham Conservatoire, Conservatoire NDR Rueil-Malmaison and the Hochschule für Musik Köln, supported by an award from the Countess of Munster Musical Trust. His teachers have included David Sanger, David Saint, Susan Landale and Thierry Mechler.

In 2007 he won both first prize and special prize at the Odense International Organ Competition in Denmark and released a Naxos disc featuring Maurice Duruflé's complete organ music on the Cavaillé-Coll organ in Notre Dame d'Auteuil, Paris, for which he also wrote the accompanying notes. During 2008 he was due to perform Messiaen's complete organ music in a series of six concerts for the Barber Institute of Fine Arts in Birmingham, but two concerts had to be rescheduled to 2009, due to injury.

In 2011-2012 he was invited to be a guest tutor and jury member at the Carl Nielsen International Festival and Competition, Denmark; Edinburgh Organ Academy; London Organ Day; and the Royal Norwegian Academy, Oslo.

Projects include 2012–2015: JS Bach – organ works 2011: Alain – organ works (performed in three concerts) 2011: 'Lisztomania' – Three Great Organ Works and Reubke Sonata (Birmingham and Edinburgh) 2008: Messiaen – organ works (six concerts for the Barber Institute of Fine Arts/University of Birmingham) 2002: Duruflé – organ works.
