= Meyrick Alexander =

English classical bassoonist (born 1952)

- Born: 18 May 1952 (age 72)
- Occupation: Bassoonist
- Known for: One of the UK's best known bassoonists and bassoon teachers

Meyrick Alexander (born 18 May 1952) is an English bassoonist. He is one of the UK's best known bassoonists and bassoon teachers.

== Life ==
He is the son of the philosopher Peter Alexander (1917–2006) and his wife Caryl.

As a performer, Alexander was Principal Bassoon of the Philharmonia Orchestra for 30 years, and currently plays principal with the London Chamber Orchestra.

Alexander is Professor of Bassoon at the Royal Academy of Music and has also taught at the Royal Welsh College of Music & Drama, where he was Head of Woodwind and remains a tutor, the Royal Northern College of Music, Royal Birmingham Conservatoire, and, for most of his career, at the Guildhall School of Music and Drama.

Alexander has appeared as a soloist on numerous occasions including performances of the Mozart Bassoon Concerto under Vladimir Ashkenazy; he has made two solo recordings with the London Chamber Orchestra. Alexander is a specialist on the baroque bassoon which he plays in John Eliot Gardiner's Orchestre Révolutionnaire et Romantique and the English Baroque Soloists.
