= Susan Spain-Dunk =

English composer, conductor and violinist (1880–1962)

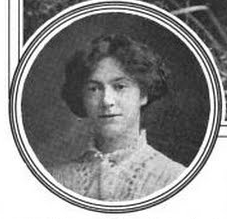
Susan Spain-Dunk, from a 1916 publication.

Susan Spain-Dunk FRAM (22 February 1880 Folkestone, England – 1 January 1962 London) was an English composer, conductor and violinist/violist.

== Life and career ==
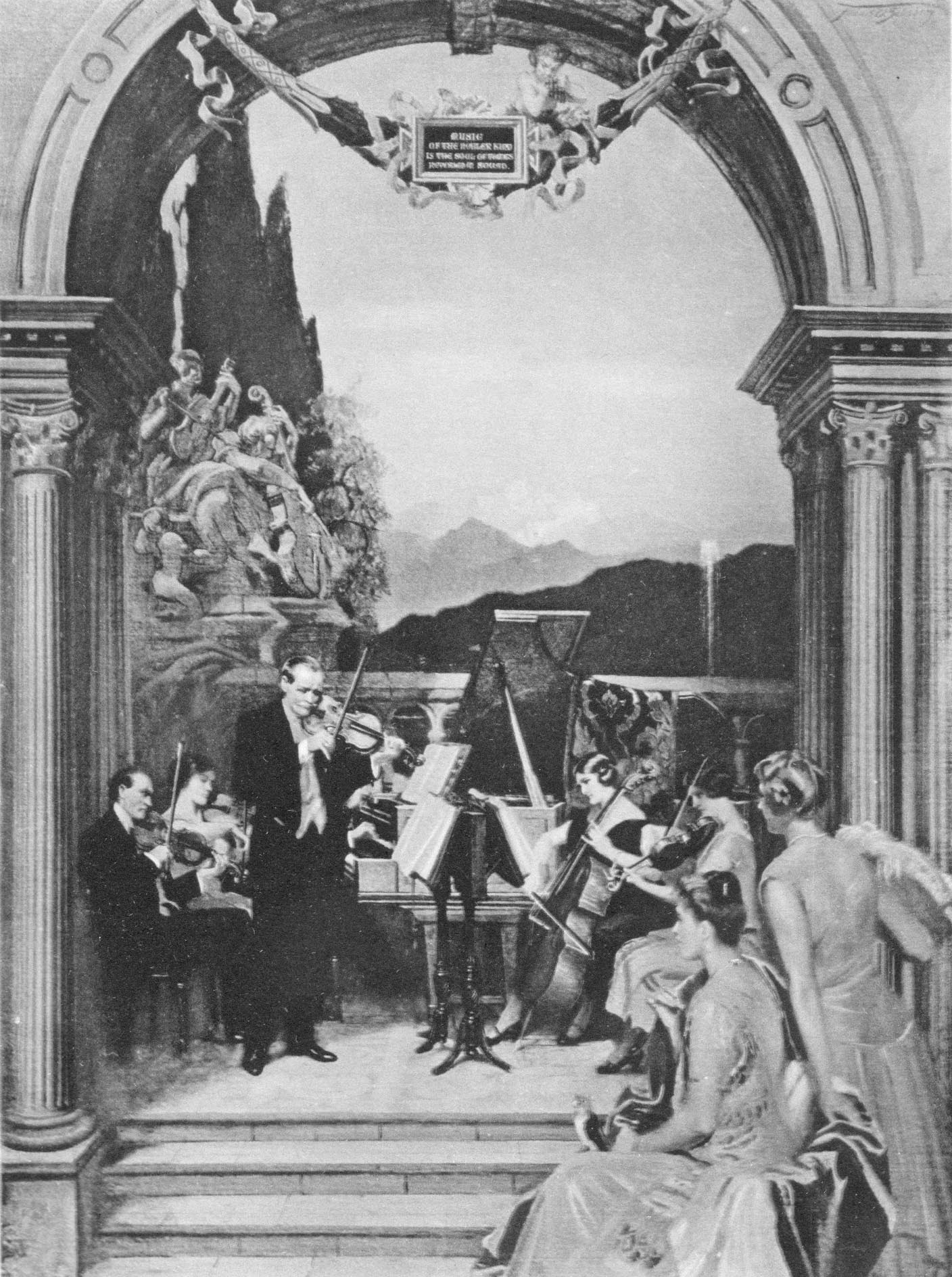
The Concert Party by Frank Owen Salisbury (1929), illustrating W. W. Cobbett's private quartet. Susan Spain-Dunk is playing the viola.

Susan was the third of four children (Ethel K Dunk b. 1876; John De Lanoy Dunk b. 1878; Susan Spain Dunk b. 1880; William Major b. 1882). Their father was a master plumber and house builder. Her second name, Spain, was added as the Dunk family were related to the Spain family. She studied violin and composition at The Royal Academy of Music, London with Alfred Gibson, Stewart Macpherson and Richard Walthew and later taught composition and harmony there. For a time she played the viola in a private quartet of Walter Cobbett. She also played (violin or viola) in the Winifred Small Quartet and Cobbett made suggestions for "Anthology" programmes for the quartet. She conducted some of her own works at the British Women's Symphony Orchestra. She also conducted her own works at The London Promenade Concerts (1924-1927) and at Bournemouth, Folkestone, Eastbourne and Torquay. Susan Spain-Dunk also conducted work by other women composers, including Edith Swepstone's tone poem, A Vision.

In 1908 she married Henry Gibson (7 October 1882 - 22 July 1954). He was a minor composer, violinist, organist and pianist. The marriage lasted about sixteen years and she had one son, The Reverend Alan Henry Gibson (November 1911-September 1999), and two grandchildren. In the mid-1930s she was living at 17, Elm Park Mansions in Chelsea. She died on 1 January 1962 aged 81.

Spain-Dunk appears in the book Some Folkestone Worthies by C.H. Bishop, and (anonymously) in the painting The Concert Party (1929) by Frank Owen Salisbury.

== Music ==
Her orchestral works include the Suite for String Orchestra (1920), the Idyll for Strings (1925), the overtures Water Lily Pool (1925) and Kentish Downs (1926), two symphonic poems: Elaine (1927) and Stonehenge (1929) and the Cantilena for clarinet and orchestra (1931). The Suite was premiered at the Proms on Thursday 21 August 1924. There is a modern recording, from a new edition of the score edited by Peter Cigleris. The Idyll and Water Lily Pool (for flute, harp and strings) were both premiered at a British Women's Symphony Orchestra concert at Queen's Hall on 25 May 1925, and repeated at the Proms on 13 October 1925.

Kentish Downs, first performed at the Proms on 30 August 1926 was revived on BBC Radio 3 in 1997 with the BBC Concert Orchestra, conducted by Barry Wordsworth with a further BBC Radio 3 broadcast in 2001. Elaine was conducted by the composer at the Proms on 25 August 1927, and Stonehenge was produced at the Eastbourne Festival in 1929 and played again in Bournemouth in 1931. It was revived by the BBC Concert Orchestra in a broadcast from Watford Colosseum under conductor Anna-Maria Helsing on 19 January 2019. The Idyll, Kentish Downs and Elaine are mentioned in the letters of Gerald Finzi and Howard Ferguson (p. 12).

The Cantilena for clarinet and orchestra (sometimes known as Poem) was revived by the Folkestone Symphony Orchestra with soloist Peter Cigleris on 16 March 2019, its first performance since 1931. It has since been recorded.

One of Spain-Dunk's most popular chamber works is the Phantasy for String Quartet in G minor (1915). A recording was made by the Archaeus String Quartet on the Lorelt Label and released on 27 June 2003. There are also modern recordings of her Violin Sonata No 3 in C minor (1910), Piano Quartet (circa 1920) and Rhapsody Quintet for wind ensemble. The autograph manuscript of the Quartet in B flat minor was written and dated March 1914 with an address of 49 Castletown Road, West Kensington, London.

Andred's Weald - for military orchestra (1925) – was conducted by Spain-Dunk on 28 February 1929 with the Bournemouth Municipal Orchestra. Andred's Weald was published as the Farmer's Boy overture. It was recorded and broadcast on BBC Radio 3 by the BBC Scottish Symphony Orchestra in 2021.They also recorded Kentonia, Malaya, Two Scottish Pieces and made a new recording of The Kentish Downs.

Two of Spain-Dunk's choral works, Verses from Psalm 43 and her cantata The Baptism of Jesus have been recorded by The BBC Singers.

A World Premiere performance of her two Preludes for Piano, by Duncan Honeybourne, was broadcast on BBC Radio 3 in May 2021.

Spain-Dunk's orchestral works and much of her chamber music have been transcribed and edited from her manuscripts by Peter Cigleris. This has led to a number of works being recorded by BBC orchestras and broadcast.

== Publicly available recorded works ==
The following works are known to have been recorded and released:

- Phantasy Quartet in D minor. Archaeus String Quartet. LORELT LNT114 (2003).
- Karisma. Palm Court Light Orchestra, conducted by Charles Job. Palm Court Souvenirs (2008).
- Phantasy Quartet. Suffrage Sinfonia, conducted by Alice Farnham. The Lost Women Of Music (2019).
- Cantilena for Clarinet and Orchestra, Op. 51. Edited by Peter Cigleris. Peter Cigleris clarinet, Deian Rowlands harp, BBC National Orchestra of Wales, conducted by Ben Palmer. Cala Signum SIGCD656 (2021).
- Suite in B Minor for string orchestra and Lament for string orchestra. Edited by Peter Cigleris. Sudwestdeutsches Kammerorchester Pforzheim, conducted by Douglas Bostock. CPO CX 5457 (2021).
- Violin Sonata no 3 in C minor, Violin Sonata in B minor and Les Sylphes. Patrick Wastnage violin, Elizabeth Dunn piano. Guild GMCD7828 (2022).
- Piano Quartet. Edited by Peter Cigleris (2021). Tippett Quartet, Lynn Arnold piano. Dutton Epoch CDLX 7396 (2022).
- Rhapsody Quintet. Edited by Peter Cigleris (2021). Camarilla Ensemble. Dutton Epoch CDLX 7398 (2022).
- The Water Lily Pool, Petite Serenade and Valse Caprice. Anna Noakes flute, Leo Nicholson piano. Dutton Epoch CDLX 7409 (2024).
- Piano Preludes No 1 and 2. Duncan Honeybourne piano. Prima Facie PFCD244 (2024).
- Winter Song. Catherine Wilmers cello, Jill Morton piano. Divine Art DDX 21134 (2025).
- Two Pieces, Shirley Turner (violin), Peter Mallinson (viola). A Musical Soirée, Meridian CDE84686 (2026)

== List of works ==
=== Orchestral ===
- Suite for string orchestra in B minor (1920)
- Andred's Weald, for military orchestra (1925)
- Idyll for strings (1925)
- Water Lily Pool, Overture for flute, harp and strings (1925) (also variously known as Romantic Piece and Sketch)
- Kentish Downs, Overture (1926)
- Elaine, symphonic poem (1927)
- Karisima (1928)
- Kentonia, concert march (1928)
- Serenade de Capri (1928)
- Farmer's Boy, Overture (1929)
- Stonehenge, symphonic poem (1929)
- Cantilena for clarinet and orchestra (also known as Poem) (1931)
- Notre Dame d'Albert, tone poem (1931)
- Highland Overture (1935)
- The Flute Player of Brindaven (1939)
- Somya Devi (Prelude) (1940)
- Legend for oboe and strings (1955)
- Cinque Ports Suite - 'Dover Castle', 'Rye Harbour', Winchelsea Gate' (1958)
- Malaya, tone poem (1958)
- Weald of Kent, Fantasia for orchestra
- Four Spanish Dances for piano and orchestra (orchestrated from piano works)
- Two Scottish Pieces for orchestra, Op.54/1. 'By St.Mary's Loch', 54/2. 'Kerrera' (also a version for violin and piano)
- Blessed Sonya, prelude
- Lament for string orchestra

=== Chamber ===
- Petite Serenade for flute and piano (1907)
- Phantasy piano trio in A minor (1907) (Cobbett prize)
- Halligen, Scandinavian dance for violin and piano (1908)
- Springdays, Scandinavian dance for violin and piano (1908)
- Violin Sonata in B minor (1908) (Cobbett prize - only the Romance survives)
- Violin Sonata No 3 in C minor (c. 1910)
- String Quartet in B flat minor (1914)
- Phantasy string quartet in D minor (1915), pub. Goodwin & Tabb, London.
- Piano Quartet (c.1920, ed. Peter Cigleris, 2021)
- Les Sylphes (c.1926-29) for violin and piano
- Lorelei Legend for violin and piano (1933)
- Jarabe, Spanish dance for violin and piano, Op.57 (1933)
- Winter Song for cello and piano (1938)
- Sextet in F major (1941)
- Dead Roses for violin and piano
- Two pieces for violin and viola: 'The lonely moor'; 'Jig'
- Trio for two violins and piano
- Violin Sonata in D minor
- Wind quintet

=== Piano ===
- Six Spanish Dances - La Madrilena, El Jaleo, Aragonaise, Pepita, Cachucha, El Ole (1936) - four were later orchestrated.
- London Pride (1937)
- Two pieces for two pianos based on two hymns by Rev. H. J. Trueman (1941)
- Piano Preludes No 1 and 2 (1941)

=== Organ ===
- Organ Prelude No 2 (1941), edited by Andrew Johnstone (2024).

=== Harmonium ===
- Farmer's Boy Overture (1935)

=== Choral ===
- Sonnets from the Portuguese - How Do I Love Thee? (1920)
- Verses from Psalm 43 - Send Out Thy Light (1958)
- The Baptism of Jesus, cantata (1959)

=== Brass band ===
- Song for Devon (1925)
- Watch Your Step (1925)
- London Pride (1937)
- Cinque Ports Suite - Dover Castle, Rye Beach, Winchelsea Gate (1958)

=== Military band ===
- Kentonia (March) (1925)
- Serenade for Military Band (1925)
- Song for Devon (1925)
- Farmer's Boy (1935)
- Scottish Phantasy (1937)
- Weald of Kent (March) (1940)

== Bibliography ==
- Bishop, C.H: Some Folkestone Worthies: Ten outstanding persons who have contributed to the life and development of old Folkestone (published by Printed by Southern Litho Printing Co., Ltd., Folkestone circa 1970), pp. 48 with monochrome illustrations and photographs.
- Finzi, Gerald; Ferguson, Howard; Hurd, Michael: Letters of Gerald Finzi and Howard Ferguson (Boydell & Brewer, 2001 - Biography & Autobiography), pp. 310. July 2001 ISBN 9780851158235
- Hodges, Betsi: W. W. Cobbett's Phantasy: A Legacy of Chamber Music in the British Musical Renaissance. (Ph.D. Dissertation, University of North Carolina, Greensboro. ProQuest, 2008), pp. 81 (p. 26)
- Powell, Ardal: The Flute (Yale University Press, 2002), pp. 347. ISBN 978-0300094985
- Sadie, Julie Anne and Samuel, Rhian (eds.) The New Grove Dictionary of Women Composers (London: Macmillan, 1994).
- Seddon, Laura: British Women Composers and Instrumental Chamber Music in the Earliest Twentieth Century (Farnham: Ashgate, 2013), pp. 248. ISBN 978-1-409-43945-5 (hb)
