= Lise de la Salle =

French classical pianist

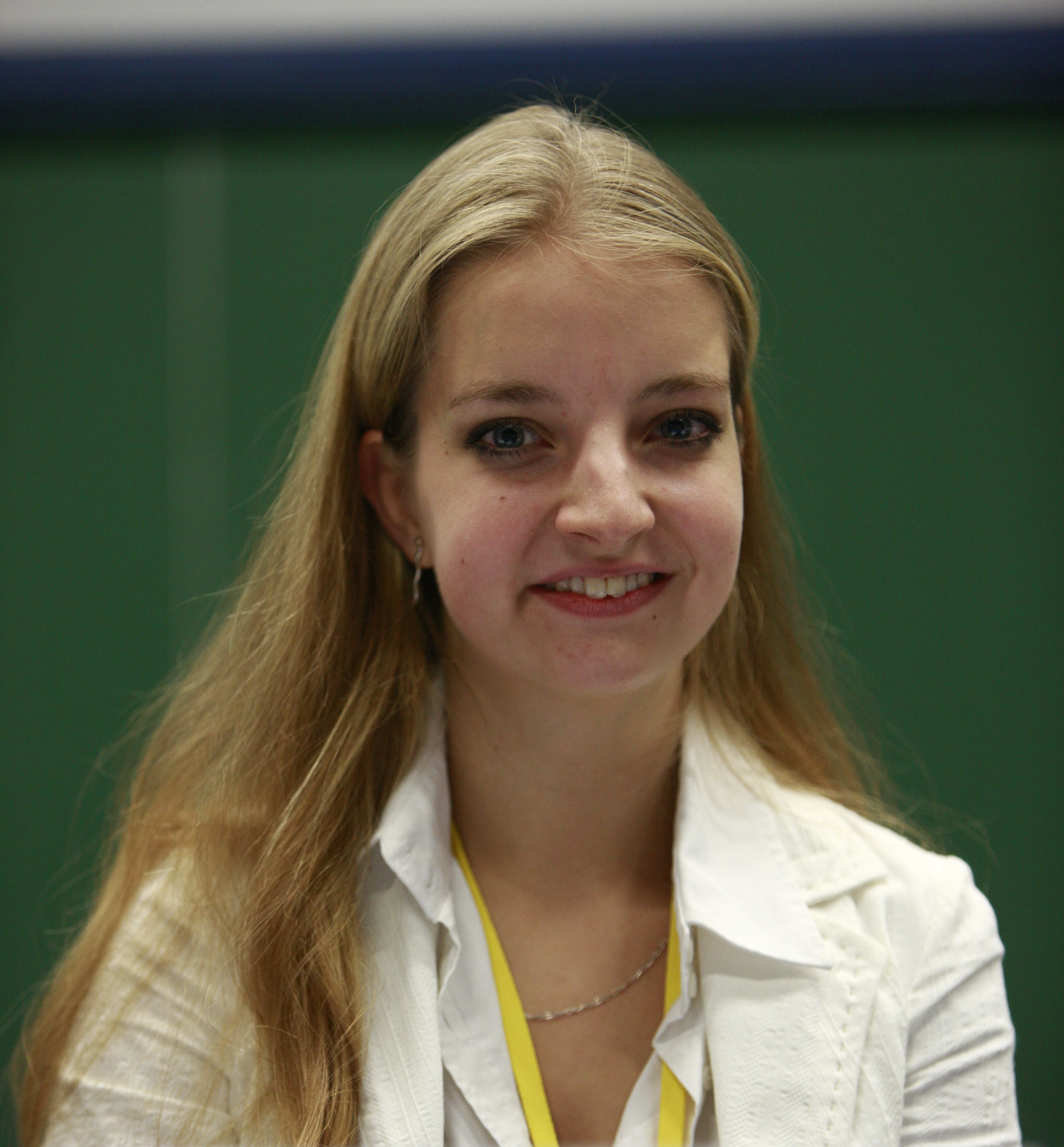
- Lise de la Salle in 2008
- Born: 8 May 1988 (age 37); Cherbourg, Northwestern France
- Occupation: Pianist
- Website: Official website

Lise de la Salle (born 8 May 1988) is a French classical pianist.

== Career ==
De la Salle first performed aged 9 on Radio France. At 12 years old, she won the First Prize at the Seventh Ettlingen International Piano Competition (Germany). She is also a prize winner of the Natexis Banques Populaires Foundation, and won First Prize of "European Young Concert Artists" in Paris in October 2003, and First Prize of the Young Concert Artists International Auditions in New York in January 2004. She became "an international solo pianist very early".

She has performed with the symphony orchestras of London, Berlin, Paris, Chicago, Boston, Washington, Los Angeles, Munich, Dresden, Philadelphia, BBC, la Scala, Rotterdam, St Petersburg, Stockholm, Singapore, and Tokyo.

She has been taught since 1998 by Pascal Nemirovski.
