= Christopher Edmunds =

English composer (1899–1990)

Christopher Montague Edmunds (26 November 1899 – 2 January 1990) was an English composer, academic and organist who lived and worked in Birmingham.

Edmunds was born in Small Heath, Birmingham. After serving as a young soldier in the war, he studied music with Granville Bantock at the Birmingham School of Music and went on to teach there from 1929 under Bantock. In 1945 he became Principal of the School (following Dr A.K. Blackall who had succeeded Bantock in 1934), a position he held until 1956. He was organist and choirmaster at Aston Parish Church from the 1930s until 1957.

His most popular composition remains the Sonatina for recorder and piano which has always stayed in print. A song, The Bellman was performed twice at The Proms, in 1929 and 1931. But he also composed widely for the choral festival movement in the 1920s and 1930s, and produced two significant works foreshadowing the war: the B minor Piano Sonata and the Symphony No 2. The Sonata was premiered by Tom Bromley in Birmingham in May 1938. It was recorded for the first time in 2021 by Duncan Honeybourne. Lewis Foreman has called the Second Symphony "a notable example of music responding to the challenges of the war in 1939 and 1940". The first complete performance, with the BBC Northern Orchestra conducted by Julius Harrison, was broadcast in April 1944.

A short opera, The Blue Harlequin, received performances in 1929 and 1937. As with the later short opera, The Fatal Rubber, it was based on a "diminutive drama" by Maurice Baring. There were also lighter orchestral and band pieces, often played during the 1960s by the BBC Midland Light Orchestra. Examples include the Festival of Youth overture and the Harlequinade suite for strings. The University of Birmingham archive includes three symphonies, four operas, 10 choral works, 25 chamber pieces and many pieces for solo piano.

For many years Edmunds lived at 19, Blythe Way in Solihull. He died in Whixley, Yorkshire.

== Selected works ==
(a list of works in the Birmingham archive is available)

Orchestral

- The Blackbird, theme and variations for small orchestra (1967)
- Concert Overture for brass band
- Festival of Youth, overture (1950)
- Harlequinade, suite for strings (1932)
- Romance for Piano and Orchestra (1942, BBC commission fp. 1944)
- Shepherd's Song for strings
- Suite of English Dances for strings and recorder (1950)
- Summer Night, waltz for harmonica and strings (1967)
- Symphony No 1 for Strings (1937)
- Symphony No 2 (1940)
- Symphony No 3 (early 1940s)
- Viola Concerto (soloist with strings, 1937)

Opera

- The Blue Harlequin, opera (1928)
- Fatal Rubber, opera (1930)
- Gallant Cassian, a puppet play (1936)
- The Goose Girl, an opera for children (1931)
- Iphigenia in Taurus, opera

Choral and vocal

- The Bellman (1929, text Robert Herrick)
- Blessed are they whose strength is in thee, anthem (1942)
- English Mass in D
- Kye-Song Of Saint Bride for soprano, chorus and orchestra (1951, text Fiona Macleod)
- The Lady of Shalott, cantata for female voices and orchestra (1926)
- The Revenge, choral cantata for treble and alto voices and orchestra
- Stabat Mater (1968)
- Thorberg’s Dragon-Ship, choral ballad (1923)

Chamber and instrumental

- Andante, Longing for Summer and High Summer for oboe and piano (Schott, 1950)
- Four Pieces for piano and viola (1948)
- Highland Croon, Gay Hornpipe and Lament for clarinet and piano (Schott, 1950)
- Miniature Suite for recorder trio (Schott, 1939)
- Miniature Quartet (1955)
- Octet for Strings
- Organ Sonata in B flat (1922)
- Piano Quintet (circa 1932)
- Piano Sonata in B minor (1938)
- Prelude and Fugue on 'Es ist ein Ros' entsprungen' for organ (Lengnick, 1948, for A.K. Blackall)
- Sonatina for recorder and piano (1940)
- String Quartets No 1 and No 2
- Suite in G Major for harpsichord (1960)
- Three Pieces for Piano, Op. 30 (1936)
- Two Fantasies (in Fugue) for piano, dedicated to Marjorie Hazelhurst (1947)
- Viola Sonata in D minor (1957, dedicated to Bernard Shore)
- Violin Sonata (1938)
