= Duncan Honeybourne =

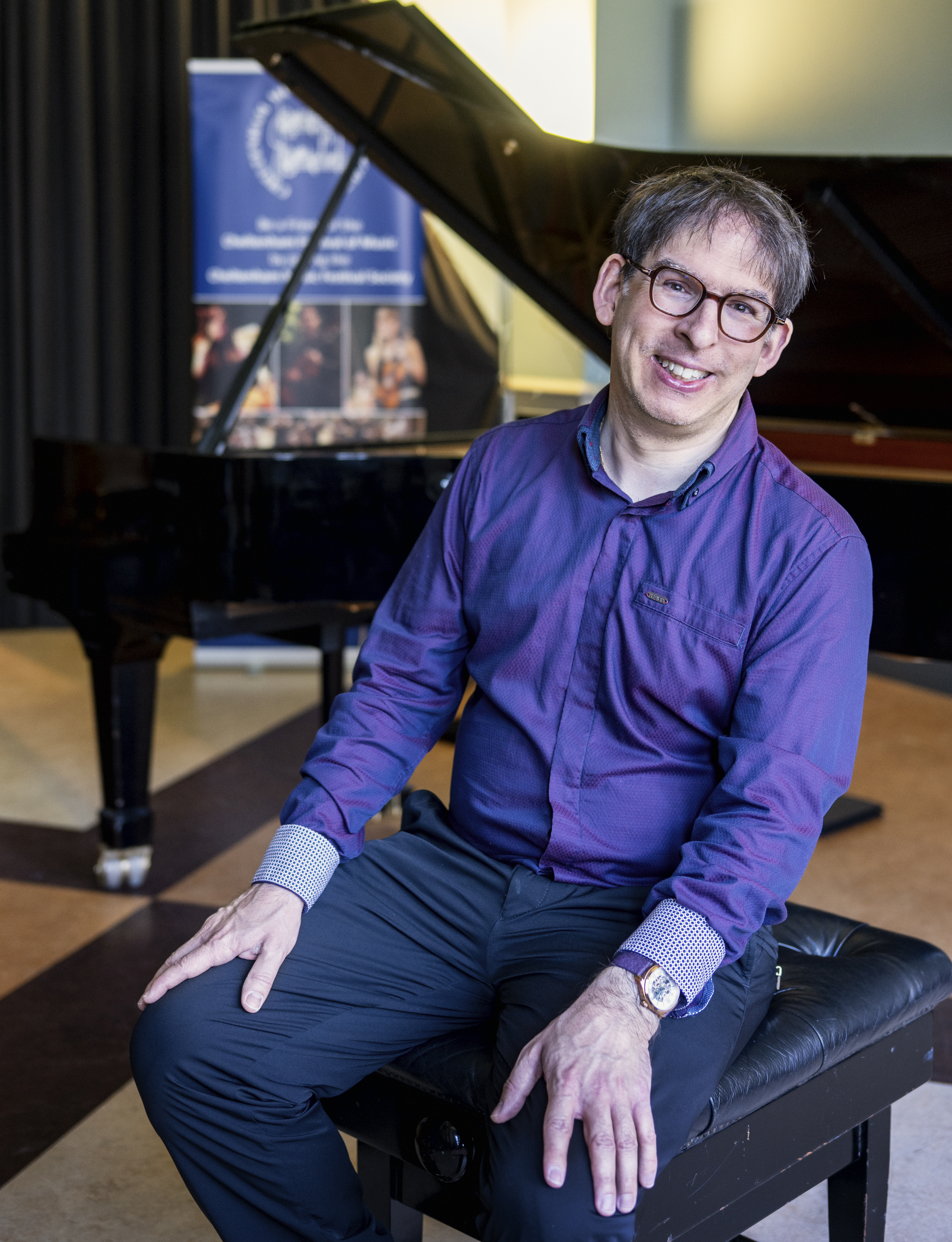

Background information
- Born: Duncan Honeybourne; 27 October 1977 (age 48); England
- Genre: Classical
- Occupations: Pianist, teacher
- Years active: 1990-

Duncan Honeybourne (born 27 October 1977) is an English pianist, teacher and lecturer.

== Biography ==
Honeybourne was born in Weymouth, Dorset. He began his studies at the Royal Academy of Music Junior Department, where he won the senior piano prize. He gave his first London recital at the age of fifteen and toured extensively throughout Britain as a solo recitalist and concerto soloist. Awarded a place to continue at the RAM, he chose instead to move to the Royal Birmingham Conservatoire where he graduated in 2000 with a B.Mus First Class Honours degree and won many prizes. He later received the honorary award of HonRBC for professional distinction. His teachers included John York in London, Fanny Waterman in Leeds, Rosemarie Wright and Philip Martin. He continued his studies in London for three years with the Russian pianist Mikhail Kazakevich, on a Goldenweiser Scholarship from the Sheepdrove Trust. He made his debut as soloist at Symphony Hall, Birmingham and the National Concert Hall, Dublin, in 1998.

He has played concertos and given solo and chamber music recitals throughout the UK and Europe. Premieres of solo works written for him have included John Joubert's "Third Piano Sonata", three piano cycles by Sadie Harrison, and "Piano Concerto" by Andrew Downes at Birmingham Town Hall. Honeybourne's programmes have included lesser-known works by composers of earlier generations, such as the 2021 premiere of two rediscovered piano preludes by English romantic composer Susan Spain-Dunk, in a BBC recital broadcast live on Radio 3 from St David's Hall, Cardiff. Alongside the release of a disc of works by Archy Rosenthal, in 2014 he gave first performances before an Oxfordshire audience including Rosenthal's grandson, Mark Bredon. 2020 saw the world premiere performances of "Tempus Plangendi" by John Casken and "After the Darkness" by Adam Gorb. In June 2021, he performed the world and London premieres of Cecilia McDowall's "Notes from Abroad" in Weymouth and Piccadilly respectively. His solo performances have been broadcast on radio networks worldwide, including BBC Radio 3, RTÉ (Ireland), Radio France Musique, Radio Suisse Romande, Austrian, Belgian, Dutch, Finnish, Portuguese and German Radio, SABC (South Africa), ABC Classic FM (Australia) and Radio New Zealand Concert.

His discography on the EM Records, Divine Art and Prima Facie labels includes the complete solo piano music of E.J. Moeran, Andrew Downes and John Joubert, and premiere recordings of works by Baines, Edgar Bainton, Christopher Edmunds, Armstrong Gibbs, Ivor Gurney, Walford Davies, Thomas Pitfield and Imogen Holst. Honeybourne has also recorded works by Bax, Elgar, Aloys Fleischmann, Howells, Stanford and Vaughan Williams. His CD A Forgotten English Romantic, exploring the piano music of composer, poet and priest Greville Cooke, was a MusicWeb International Recording of the Year in 2014.

Honeybourne's career in music education includes posts as piano tutor at the Royal Academy of Music Junior Academy (since 2022) Lecturer in Performance at the University of Southampton (2013-) and piano teacher at Sherborne School (since 2014). He has given regular masterclasses and lecture recitals.
