= Royal Birmingham Conservatoire =

Music school, drama school and concert venue in Birmingham, England

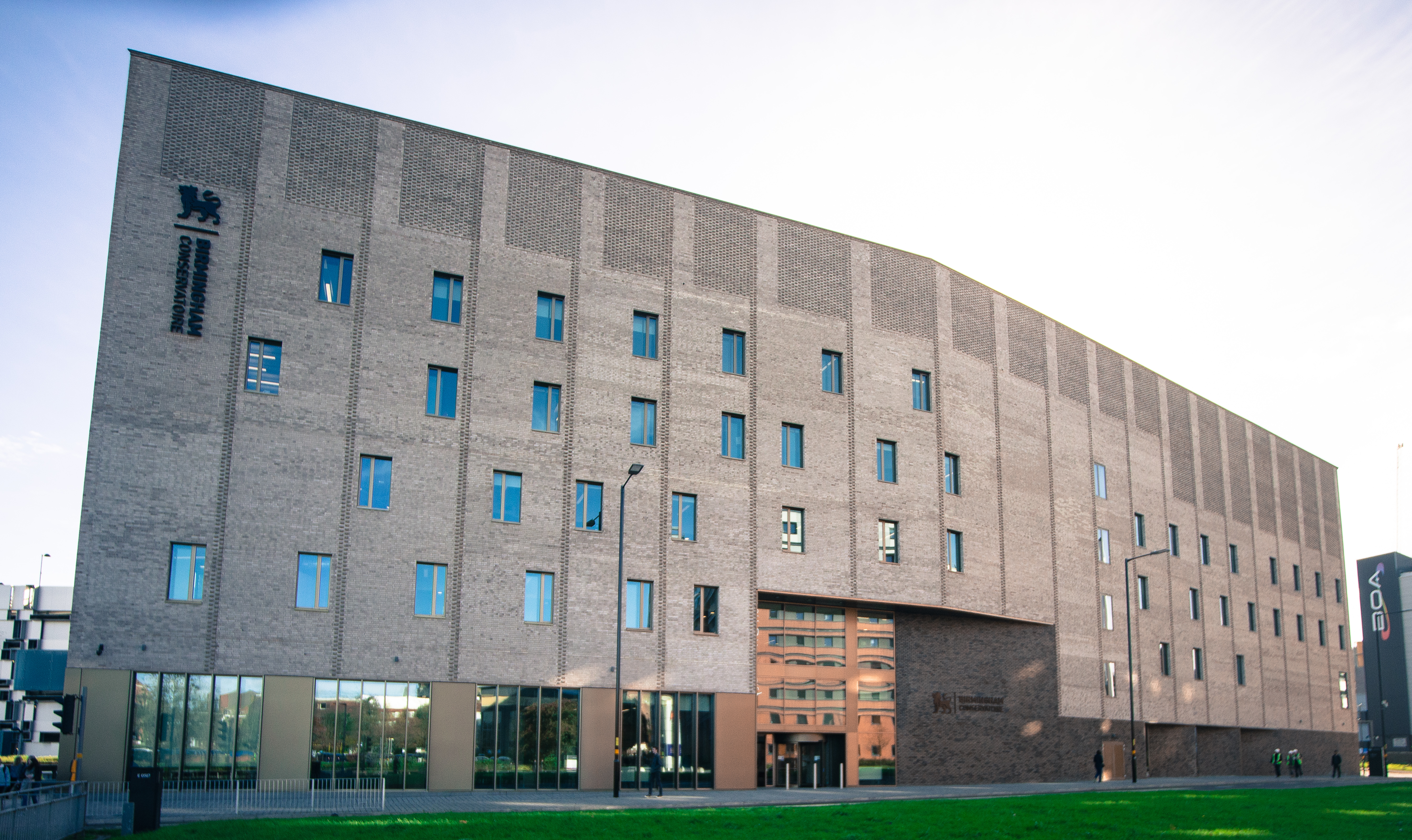
- Motto: Achieve the Extraordinary
- Type: School of Music and Acting
- Established: 1886 (as Birmingham School of Music); 1989 (as Birmingham Conservatoire); 2017 (as Royal Birmingham Conservatoire)
- Parent institution: Birmingham City University
- Affiliations: Conservatoires UK; European Association of Conservatoires; Federation of Drama Schools
- President: Sir Simon Rattle
- Vice-president: Peter Donohoe
- Principal: Stephen Maddock
- Administrative staff: 100
- Students: 1200
- Location: Jennens Road, Birmingham, B4 7XR, United Kingdom; 52.48397°N 1.88637°W
- Campus: Urban
- Website: www.bcu.ac.uk/conservatoire
- Building details

General information
- Elevation: 122 m (400 ft) AOD
- Construction started: August 2015
- Completed: August 2017
- Opened: September 2017
- Cost: £57 million

Height
- Height: 26.4 metres (87 ft)

Technical details
- Material: Pale Buff Brick
- Floor count: 1 (UG) 5(OG)
- Floor area: 10,350 m^{2} (111,406 sq ft)
- Lifts/elevators: 3

Design and construction
- Architecture firm: Feilden Clegg Bradley
- Services engineer: Hoare Lea
- Main contractor: Galliford Try

Royal Birmingham Conservatoire is a music school, drama school and concert venue in Birmingham, England. It provides education in music, acting, and related disciplines up to postgraduate level. It is a centre for scholarly research and doctorate-level study in areas such as performance practice, composition, musicology and music history. It is the only one of the nine conservatoires in the United Kingdom that is also part of a faculty of a university, in this case Arts, Design and Media at Birmingham City University. It is a member of the Federation of Drama Schools, and a founder member of Conservatoires UK.

The conservatoire houses a 500-seat concert hall and other performance spaces including a recital hall, organ studio, and a dedicated jazz club. It was founded in 1886 as the Birmingham School of Music, the first music school to be established in England outside London.

== History ==
Royal Birmingham Conservatoire was founded in 1886 as the Birmingham School of Music, grouping together into a single entity the various musical education activities of the Birmingham and Midland Institute. The institute had conducted informal musical instruction from its foundation in 1854, and its predecessor organisation, the Birmingham Philosophical Institution, had held music classes since 1800; but it was in 1859 that music was established as a formal part of the institute's curriculum. Singing classes began in that year and, after some initial struggles, 110 students and were performing regular concerts by 1863. In 1876, a proposal was heard at the institute's council that further classes should be established on the model of the Leipzig Conservatoire, and that year the composer Alfred Gaul began teaching classes in the theory of music. In 1882 instrumental classes were started, attracting 458 students on their first year, and a separate music section created within the institute. This was established as the separate "School of Music" in 1886, with William Stockley as its first principal. The school's second principal Granville Bantock was recommended for the position by Edward Elgar.

The name 'Birmingham Conservatoire' was adopted in 1989, with its undergraduate diploma and award (GBSM and ABSM) renamed from 'Graduate/Associate of the Birmingham School of Music' to 'Graduate/Associate of the Birmingham Schools of Music', to reflect the internal structure adopted of the Schools of Creative Studies, of Orchestral Studies, of Keyboard Studies, and of Vocal Studies. In 1995, the GBSM degree-equivalent diploma was redesigned to become a full Bachelor of Music (BMus) degree. In 2008, as part of the university's reorganisation of faculties, it became a part of the Faculty of Performance, Media and English (PME), which has since merged to become the Faculty of Arts, Design and Media.

As part of the Paradise Circus redevelopment the former site of the Conservatoire was subject to a compulsory purchase by Birmingham City Council. The Conservatoire received £29 million in compensation in a deal agreed in December 2013; this deal included £12.4 million of council expenditure. Designed by Feilden Clegg Bradley Studios the new building on Jennens Road contains teaching and performance space including a 500-seat concert hall to replace Adrian Boult Hall. Building work started in August 2015 and was completed in August 2017. Adrian Boult Hall was demolished in June 2016. The remaining building on Paradise Circus was demolished by April 2018 as part of Phase I of the scheme. In July 2015, Galliford Try were confirmed as principal contractor on a £46 million contract.

In 2017 the conservatoire merged with the Birmingham School of Acting, which had been founded as a drama school in 1936, bringing music and drama teaching together into a single organisation.

On 24 September 2017 the conservatoire was granted Royal status by Queen Elizabeth II.

== The conservatoire ==
In 2003, there were around 600 students enrolled in the Conservatoire's undergraduate and postgraduate degrees. Subjects include solo performance, composition, chamber music, orchestral playing, music technology and jazz. Students on the four-year BMus(Hons) are encouraged to spend time studying in Europe or the USA.

In their Junior Department, training for children aged 8 to 18 years takes place weekly on Saturdays during the local school term.

The museum has a notable collection of musical instruments.

== Departments ==
- Brass
- Chamber Music
- Composition
- Conducting (Choral)
- Conducting (Orchestral)
- Early music
- Jazz
- Keyboard
- Music Technology
- Percussion
- Performing Ensembles
- Strings
- Vocal & Operatic
- Woodwind

== Performances ==
Conservatoire students perform regularly in the conservatoire's concert venues, and also nationally often at Symphony Hall Birmingham and Birmingham Town Hall and internationally under such conductors as Sir Simon Rattle, Pierre Boulez, Sakari Oramo, Mirga Grazinyte-Tyla, Paul Spicer and Jeffrey Skidmore.

The conservatoire collaborates with other schools of music, colleges, academies and conservatoires worldwide, including participating in the Erasmus student and staff exchange programme.

== Courses offered ==
Royal Birmingham Conservatoire offers training from pre-college level (Junior Conservatoire) to PhD.

- Bachelor of Music honours degrees
  - BMus (Hons) Performance
  - BMus (Hons) Jazz
  - BMus (Hons) Composition
  - BMus (Hons) Music Technology
- Bachelor of Science honours degree
  - BSc (Hons) Music Technology
- Graduate Diploma in Jazz
- Postgraduate Certificate
  - PgCert
- Postgraduate Diploma
  - PgDip (Music)
  - PgDip (Musical Theatre) — to be delivered jointly with Birmingham School of Acting
- Advanced Postgraduate Diploma
  - Advanced PgDip
- Master of Music
  - MMus
- Master of Philosophy
  - MPhil
- Doctor of Philosophy
  - PhD

== People ==
=== Principals ===
- William Stockley (1886–1900)
- Granville Bantock (1900–1934)
- Allen Blackhall (1934–1945)
- Christopher Edmunds (1945–1956)
- (Management Committee) (1956–1957)
- Sir Steuart Wilson (1957–1960)
- Gordon Clinton (1960–1973)
- John Bishop (1973–1975)
- Louis Carus (1975–1987)
- Roy Wales (1987–1989)
- Kevin Thompson (1989–1993)
- George Caird (1993–2010)
- David Saint (2010–2015)
- Julian Lloyd Webber (2015–2020)
- Shirley Thompson (Interim, 2020–23)
- Stephen Maddock (2023-)

=== Staff ===
As of 2013, Royal Birmingham Conservatoire had around 80 full-time members of staff that included active professional musicians, performers, composers, conductors and scholars. In addition, nearly 250 specialist tutors, musicians and scholars visit the conservatoire to give classes and guest lectures or to serve as visiting faculty members.

Notable current and former staff and visiting guest artists include:

- Meyrick Alexander - bassoonist
- Stephen Barlow - conductor
- Ed Bennett - composer; leader/conductor, decibel
- Mark Bebbington - pianist
- Nicola Benedetti - violinist
- Christian Blackshaw - pianist
- Arno Bornkamp - saxophonist
- Margaret Cookhorn - contrabassoonist
- Philip Cobb - trumpeter
- Joe Boughton - Folk Musician, composer, band leader
- Rutland Boughton - composer
- Pierre Boulez - composer
- Jiafeng Chen - violinist
- Jiaxin Cheng - cellist
- Gary Cooper – conductor, harpsichordist
- Joe Cutler - composer
- Nicholas Daniel - oboist
- Danielle de Niese - soprano
- Andrew Downes - composer
- Tony Dudley-Evans
- Henry Fairs - organist
- Catrin Finch - harpist
- Margaret Fingerhut - pianist
- Byron Fulcher - trombonist
- James Galway - flautist
- James Gilchrist - tenor
- Rivka Golani - violist
- Mirga Grazinyte-Tyla - conductor
- Simon Halsey - conductor
- Stephen Hough - pianist
- Leonidas Kavakos - violinist
- Sheku Kanneh-Mason - cellist
- Miloš Karadaglić - guitarist
- Jonathan Kelly - oboe
- Hans Koller - pianist; composer; bandleader
- Stephen Kovacevich
- Justin Lavender - vocal
- Robert Levin - harpsichord/fortepiano
- Tasmin Little - violinist
- Julian Lloyd Webber - cellist
- Louis Lortie - pianist
- Rupert Marshall-Luck - violinist
- Philip Martin - pianist
- Denis Matthews - pianist
- Melinda Maxwell - oboist
- John Mayer - composer
- Daniel Moult - organist
- Tai Murray- violinist
- Pascal Nemirovski - pianist
- Liam Noble - pianist; composer; bandleader
- Craig Ogden - guitarist
- Edwin Roxburgh - composer; conductor; oboist
- Howard Skempton - composer; accordionist
- Jeffrey Skidmore - conductor, Ex Cathedra
- Dmitry Sitkovetsky - violinist; conductor
- Paul Spicer - conductor
- Mike Stevens (saxophonist) - musical director
- Simon de Souza - horn
- Errollyn Wallen - composer
- Michael Wolters - composer
- Jian Wang (cellist) - cellist
- Mary Wiegold's Songbook - vocalist
- Sarah Willis - horn
- Barry Wordsworth - conductor
- Di Xiao - pianist
- Ivan Yanakov (pianist) - pianist
- Xuefei Yang - guitarist
- Lauren Zhang - pianist

=== Fellows ===
- Gildas Quartet - Junior Fellows

=== Alumni ===
- Ben Lee - jazz mandolin player
- Richard van Allan - opera singer
- Nicola Coughlan - actress
- Fred Thelonius Baker - guitarist, bassist
- Dave Cliff - jazz guitarist
- Krzysztof Czerwiński - organist; conductor
- Henry Fairs - organist
- Brian Ferneyhough - composer
- Mark Gasser - pianist
- Duncan Honeybourne - pianist
- Albert Ketèlbey - composer, conductor
- Jim Moray - singer, producer
- Laura Mvula - singer
- Michael Rayner - opera singer
- Jean Rigby - opera singer
- Rhydian Roberts - singer
- Michael Seal - violinist, conductor, CBSO
- Mike Stevens - musical director, producer
- Ian Venables - composer
- Segun Akinola - composer

== Venues ==
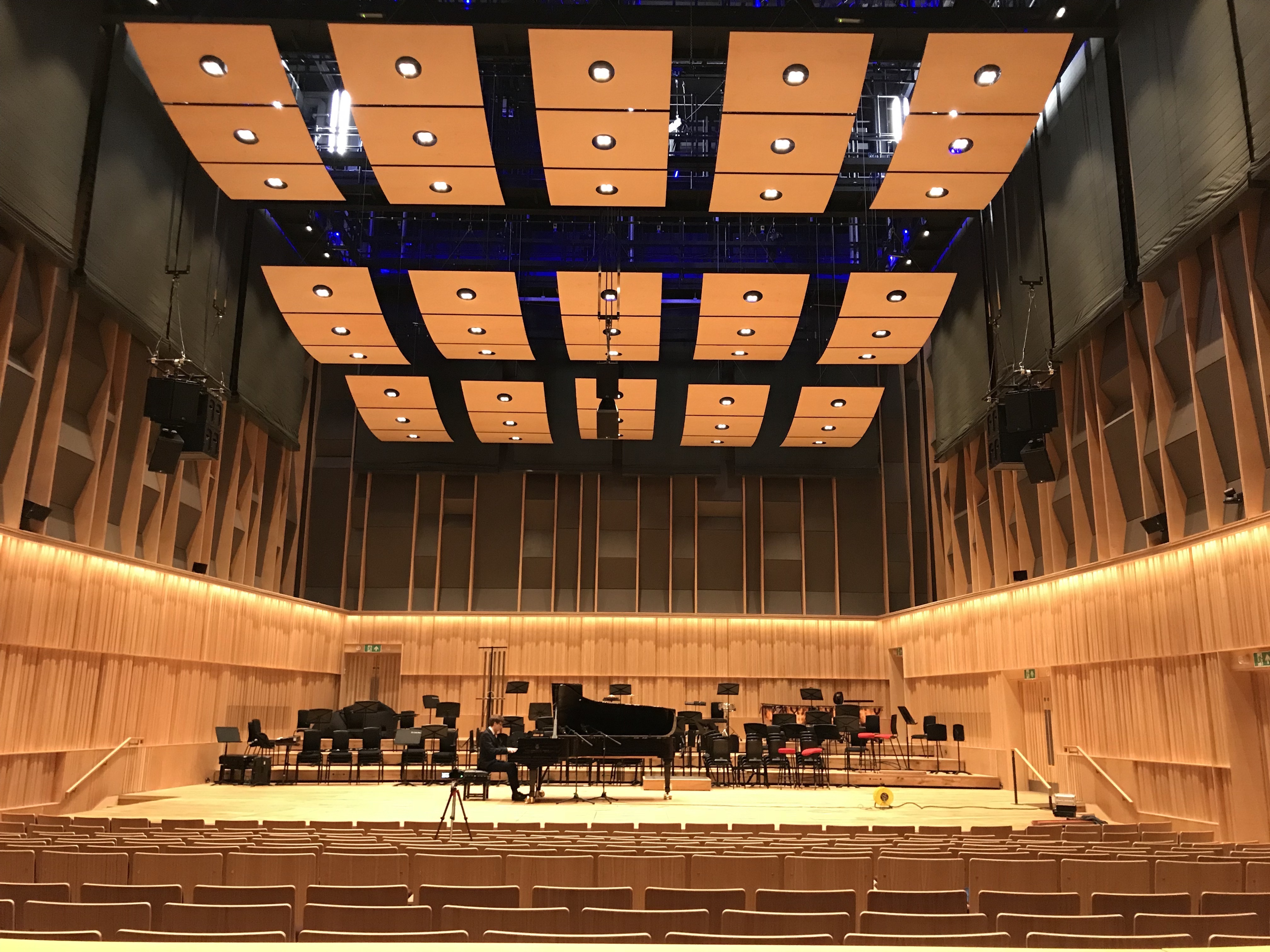
The Bradshaw Hall

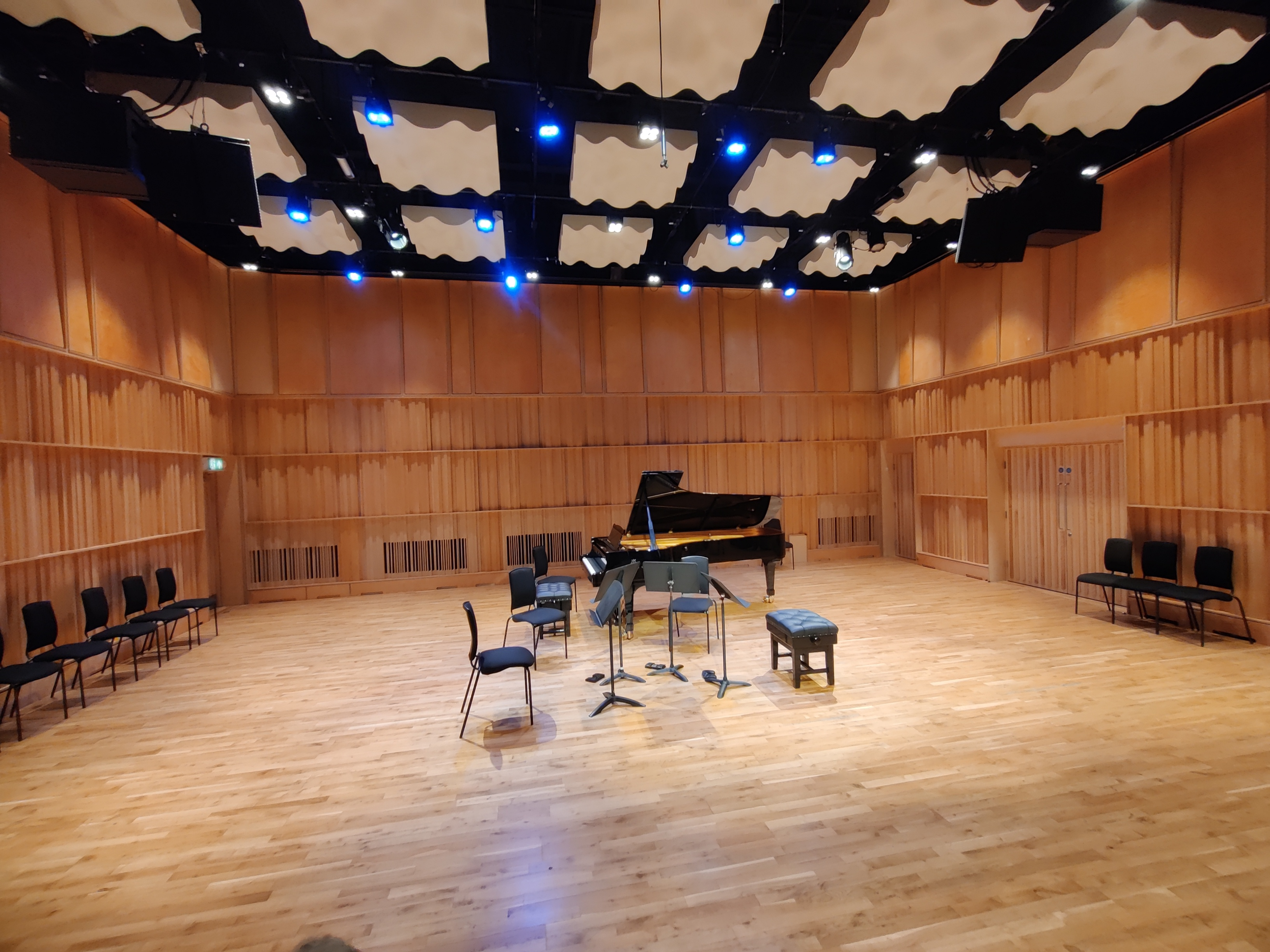
The Recital Hall, set out for the performance of a piano quintet

- The Bradshaw Hall, formerly known as The Concert Hall, 500 seats
- Recital Hall, 150 seats
- Organ Studio, 100 seats
- Eastside Jazz Club, 80 seats
- Experimental Music Lab

== See also ==
- Education in Birmingham

== Bibliography ==
- Brock, David (1986). The Birmingham School of Music: its first century. Birmingham: City of Birmingham Polytechnic.
- Smith, John D. (2011). "Celebrating 125 Years of Birmingham Conservatoire" (PDF). Birmingham Conservatoire.
- Morley, Christopher. Royal Birmingham Conservatoire, 2017, Elliott & Thompson
