= Joe Cutler =

British composer

Joe Cutler (born London, 17 December 1968) is a British composer who grew up in Neasden and studied music at the Universities of Huddersfield and Durham, before receiving a Polish Government Scholarship to study at the Chopin Academy of Music in Warsaw, Poland. He has taught composition at the Royal Birmingham Conservatoire since 2000, and since 2005 he has been the Head of Composition there. In 2015 he was made Professor of Composition. He is also the co-founder of the instrumental ensemble Noszferatu.

== Influence ==
During the late 1980s and early 1990s, Cutler, like many of his generation, including Americans composers Michael Gordon and David Lang, and British composer Steve Martland, was influenced by the minimalist music of Louis Andriessen. Like Andriessen, Cutler rejected the atonal inheritance of Arnold Schoenberg in favour of the more rhythmically driving music of Igor Stravinsky. In these early works, Cutler showed influences ranging from Minimalism and Andriessen to 1980s avant-garde modernism and even the rhythmic aspects of the New Complexity movement. This is seen in such works as Epitaph for Nebula (1989) and Blast! (1992), where atonality and complicated driving rhythms preside.

== Works ==
During the 1990s, as Cutler's mature style developed, the complicated rhythms were gradually replaced with simpler, but still motoric, jazz inspired rhythms whilst the atonal element lost ground to allusions to Eastern-European modality and jazz. This is seen in one of his most popular works, Sal's Sax (1996), written for the De Ereprijs Ensemble. In more recent years, Cutler has developed a more lyrical side along with his influences from postminimalism, which led to works such as Awakenings (1998), Sikorski (2005) and Hawaii Hawaii Hawaii (2019).

Cutler has been commissioned by Opera 21, BBC Proms, BBC Radio 3, London Symphony Orchestra, BBC Concert Orchestra, Scottish Chamber Orchestra, Swedish Chamber Orchestra, London Sinfonietta, Sage Gateshead, Birmingham Contemporary Music Group, Seoul National University, Orkest de Ereprijs, Orkest de Volharding, Royal National Theatre, HCMF, Spitalfields Festival, Orchestra of the Swan, London Cultural Olympics, Scottish Ensemble, Schubert Ensemble, International Guitar Foundation a.o.

He received a Special Mention at the 1997 Gaudeamus Music Week, and 2nd Prize in the 2000 Toru Takemitsu Award. In 2008, Cutler won the Chamber Music Category in the BBC Composer Awards with his piece, 'Folk Music'. In 2016, he also received a British Composer Award in the Jazz Category for ‘Karembeu's Guide to the Complete Defensive Midfielder’. In 2023 he was shortlisted for a Royal Philharmonic Society Award in the Large Scale Work Category for ‘Concerto Grosso’.

In 2010, Cutler was one of twenty composers commissioned to write a piece for the London 2012 Olympics.

== Recordings ==
Cutler has released four albums of his work. Bartlebooth was released on NMC in 2008 and was one of Gramophone's Top 20 releases of 2008. Boogie Nights was released in 2012 on Birmingham Record Company. Elsewhereness was released on NMC Recordings in 2018, reaching number 10 in the Classical Specialist Charts. His most recent release is Hawaii Hawaii Hawaii which was released on Birmingham Record Company in 2020

== Selected works ==
- Epitaph for Nebula (1989), for mixed ensemble
- Blast! (1992), for clarinet, violin, cello and piano
- Gaia (1993), for viola solo
- Shamen (1994), for trombone solo
- Sal's Sax (1996), for mixed ensemble
- Awakenings (1998), for large orchestra
- Urban Myths (1999), for saxophone and piano
- Five Mobiles after Alexander Calder (2000), for soprano saxophone (or clarinet), viola and piano
- Without Fear of Vertigo (2001), for mixed ensemble
- Music for Cello and Strings (2005), for cello and string orchestra
- In Praise of Dreams (2005), for soprano and piano
- Sikorski (2005), for mixed ensemble
- Folk Music (2007), for string quartet
- Music for Sunflowers (2009), for viola and string orchestra
- Ping! (2012), for string quartet and four table tennis players
- Boogie Nights (2012), for mixed ensemble and mechanical organ
- Karembeu's Guide to the Complete Defensive Midfielder (2015), for improvising duo and mixed ensemble
- McNulty (2016), for piano trio
- Elsewhereness (2018), for symphony orchestra
- Hawaii Hawaii Hawaii (2019), for saxophone and orchestra
- Just Passing Through (2020), for solo piano and large ensemble
- Concerto Grosso (2022), for solo ensemble and string orchestra/timpani
- Painted Time (2023), for piano trio

Cutler's music is published by Composers Edition.
