= Pascal Nemirovski =

French pianist and piano teacher

- Born: January 1962 (age 64); France
- Education: Juilliard School
- Occupations: Pianist, piano teacher

Pascal Nemirovski (born January 1962) is a French pianist and piano teacher.

== Biography ==
Nemirovski studied in Paris with Elena Varvarova and France Clidat. In 1981 he was admitted to the Juilliard School on a Steinway scholarship covering three years of tuition, with further awards from the Juilliard School and the Freundlich Fund; there he studied until 1984 with Nadia Reisenberg, a pupil of Josef Hofmann, and Adele Marcus, a pupil of Josef Lhevinne and Artur Schnabel. He later worked with Alexis Weissenberg from 1987.

From 1989 to 1994 he was Assistant Adviser for the master classes to the violinist Vladimir Spivakov, artistic director of the Colmar International Festival. Until 1995 he performed in Europe, Asia and the United States, and broadcast for France Musique, France Culture and Radio France Internationale. In November 1995, following a recital in the Midis du Louvre series in Paris, he decided to devote himself fully to teaching.

In 2004 he released a studio recording, Entre Ciel et Terre, devoted to works by Chopin, Prokofiev and Scriabin. Reviewing it in Le Figaro, the critic Jacques Doucelin praised his performance of Prokofiev's Seventh Sonata for its "perfect rhythmic control and remarkable balance between virtuosity and musicality".

== Teaching ==
From 2006 to 2016 he taught at the Royal Academy of Music in London, where from 2008 he was responsible for the Piano Pedagogy specialism of the Licentiate of the Royal Academy of Music (LRAM); he was made an Honorary Associate of the Royal Academy of Music (Hon ARAM) in 2009. From 2011 to 2017 he also taught at The Purcell School. In 2015 he was appointed visiting professor at the Royal Birmingham Conservatoire, where he has held the International Chair in Piano since September 2016.

He has given master classes at institutions including the Central Conservatory of Music in Beijing, the Shanghai Conservatory of Music, the Guangzhou Conservatory, the Sibelius Academy in Helsinki, the Royal Irish Academy of Music in Dublin, the Buchmann-Mehta School of Music in Tel Aviv, the Jerusalem Music Centre, the Moscow Conservatory and the University of Oxford. His students include Lise de la Salle and Louis Schwizgebel, as well as Emanuil Ivanov, George Harliono, Daniel Lebhardt, Roman Kosyakov, Edward Leung, Mario Mora and Yi Zhong.

== Competitions and other activities ==
With Béatrice Quoniam he founded the Concours de Piano de Lagny-sur-Marne in 2006, which became international in 2009 and which he directed until 2015; together they created the Concours International de Piano Antoine de Saint-Exupéry in Saint-Priest, held from 2017 to 2019. In 2022 he was appointed artistic director and chairman of the Madrid International Piano Competition, and directed its 2023 edition. He has served on the juries of international piano competitions, including the MozArte International Piano Competition in Aachen, the Maria Canals International Music Competition in Barcelona and the Xinghai Cup in Beijing.

With Béatrice Quoniam he co-wrote the two-volume piano method Les Leçons de piano (Éditions Henry Lemoine, Paris, 2007 and 2010). In 2023 he founded IPM – International Piano Masters, which combines an international academy in Vienna with master classes, competitions and lectures for young pianists.
