= Music Manifesto =

The Music Manifesto is a government-supported campaign to improve young people's music education in England launched in 2004 and based on an agreed strategy and set of priorities. It promotes a 'music for all' agenda and wishes to see more musical opportunities for more young people.

== History ==
The Music Manifesto came about as a result of a collaboration between two government departments (the Department for Education and Skills (DfES), now DCSF, and the Department for Culture, Media and Sport (DCMS)) and a wide range of music organisations, musicians, teachers, composers, the music industry, broadcasting, teacher and musicians' unions, arts and education charities and Trusts.

It was developed through three seminars led by David Miliband, Member of Parliament and School Standards Minister. An internet discussion board was set up to allow ongoing discussion and input was sought from the Music Advanced Skills Teachers network and the wider National Music Education Forum. While working closely with the DCSF and DCMS, the Music Manifesto remains independent of the Government.

The Music Manifesto offers a strategic direction for the future of music education and a common agenda for joint action. It has published two reports, the second of which set out over 50 recommendations for improving music education.

== Campaigns ==
The latest project supported by the Music Manifesto is In Harmony, a programme inspired by Venezuela's El Sistema, which gives free instrumental tuition to young children in some of the country's most deprived areas.

In November 2007, the Secretary of State for Children, Schools and Families, Ed Balls, recognised the contribution of the Music Manifesto when he announced a £332 million funding package for music education.

The Music Manifesto's £40 million National Singing Programme, Sing Up, was launched in November 2007 with the aim to put singing at the heart of every primary school.

The Wider Opportunities programme aims to give all Key Stage 2 pupils the chance to play an instrument.

From 2005 to 2008, three Music Manifesto Pathfinder organisations developed a range of projects designed to offer young people access to inspiring, quality music provision.

For 2008-09 five partnership programmes have been funded to provide music activities in line with the Manifesto's aims.
