= Italian classical music =

Aspect of Italian Culture

== Medieval music ==
=== Plainsong ===
Plainsong, also known as plainchant, and more specifically Gregorian, Ambrosian, and Gallican chant, refer generally to a style of monophonic, unaccompanied, early Christian singing performed by monks and developed in the Roman Catholic Church mainly during the period 800-1000 . The differences may be marginal—or even great, in some cases. These differences reflect the great ethnic, cultural and linguistic diversity that existed after the fall of the Roman Empire on the Italian peninsula. Different monastic traditions arose within the Roman Catholic Church throughout Italy, but at different places and at older times. Even a musical non-specialist can hear the difference, for example, between the straightforward tone production in the Ambosian chants from Milan and the chants from Benevento, which display a distinct "eastern" ornamental quiver in the voice, reflecting the vocal traditions of the Greek Orthodox Church. Yet, in spite of the differences, the similarities are great. In any event, the formal Gregorian chant was imposed throughout Italy by 1100, although the music of Greeks rites continued to be heard at various places on the peninsula, especially in those places which Byzantium had once held, such as Ravenna or in the southern peninsula, which had been a refuge for those Greeks fleeing the great Byzantine iconoclast controversies before the year 1000. Obviously, where Greek rites were practiced, the chants were sung in the Greek language and not in Latin, as they were in the Roman Catholic liturgy.

=== Music of the Trecento ===
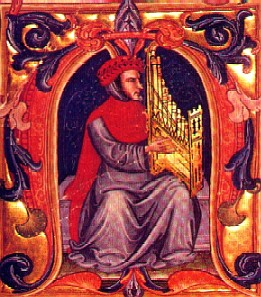
Francesco Landini, the most famous composer of the Trecento, playing a portative organ (illustration from the Fifteenth-century Squarcialupi Codex)

The Trecento, from about 1300 to 1420, was a period of vigorous activity in Italy in the arts, including painting, architecture, literature, and music. The music of the Trecento pioneered new forms of expression, especially in secular song and in the use of vernacular language, Italian. In these regards, the music of the Trecento may seem more to be a Renaissance phenomenon; however, the predominant musical language was more closely related to that of the late Middle Ages, and musicologists generally classify the Trecento as the end of the medieval era.

=== Secular music ===
Secular music before the year 1500 was largely the work of jongleurs, troubadours and mimes. This was the age of the great vernacularization of language in Italy—indeed, throughout Europe; that is, people started to write and sing songs in their native language, which was not Latin, but whatever brand of vernacular medieval neo-Latin was spoken in their area. Thus, Dante showed with the Divine Comedy in 1300 that the common language (his was called "Tuscan" and not "Italian" until as late as the 18th century) could be a vehicle for fine literature. Logically, that extended to the lyrics of the songs that people sang.

Two points are worth mentioning in this regard: (1) we know much more about the words of songs than we know about the actual sound of the music. Words were written down with much more ease than melodies were notated. (See musical notation). Thus, we know that there was a vibrant troubador tradition in the 12th century in the Provence in their language and we know that 1000 miles away on the island of Sicily there was also a vibrant troubador tradition at the Hohenstaufen court of Frederick II, songs sung in the dialect of the people (very much influenced, for example, by Arabic), but it is conjecture as to exactly what either one sounded like. We only know that southern French folk music, today, sounds quite a bit different from Sicilian folk music. Since folk music is relatively conservative in that it resists rapid change, we may assume that at least some of the obvious differences in melody, scales and approach to vocalising that exist now, existed then. The call and response nature of much popular choral singing in the Middle Ages—that is, a soloist singing a line that is then answered by a group—found its way into medieval church music as a way of involving all members of the congregation.

The complicated polyphonies of what is called the Ars Nova began to be heard in the 14th century and 15th century; popular items such as madrigals employed increasing dense overlays of different melodies sung at the same time, the point being to create an interwoven and euphonious texture of sound; this is NOT the same as harmony, the sounding of many notes together in order to form a chord. That is a later invention. Nevertheless, the move from the monophonic sounds of chants to the many simultaneous melodies of polyphony does represent a revolution in our musical perceptions: to wit, you can have more one thing sounding at the same time and still find it pleasant to listen to.

== The Renaissance ==
Most people do not think of music when they hear the term Renaissance. Yet, in the same sense that architects, painters, and sculptors of the 16th century were paying tribute to the newly rediscovered values of classical Greece, poets and musicians of that period attempted to do the same thing. The years between 1500 and 1600 are the most revolutionary period in European musical history; it is the century in which harmony was developed and the century that gave birth to opera.

These two developments are connected. Readers will have noted the move from the monophony of Gregorian chants to the complicated polyphonies of madrigals and other music of the few centuries before 1500. The next shift in musical perception involves a less common term: homophony; that is, the sounding of a harmonic chord or progression of chords, not meant to stand out, but which support an obvious melody on top of the harmony.

The desire—perhaps need—for homophonic music arose from a number of factors. First, there was a rejection of overly complicated polyphony of many different melodies running at the same time: second, a general, new musical aesthetic of the period, best summed up in the words of Leonardo da Vinci in 1500, who said that music was "the simultaneous conjunction of proportional parts"—that is, the sounding together of notes based on simple arithmetic rations such as 2:1 (which produces the sound of an octave), 3:2 (which produces the sound of fifth), and 5:4 (which produces the sound of a major third). Thus, if you generate notes at 400, 600, 800, and 1000 cycles per second, you have all the notes of the simplest and most harmonious sound in our music—the major chord. It really is that simple. (See Musical Acoustics.) Third on the list of factors that make the 16th century so important was the Renaissance desire to tell a story, to put people up on a small stage and have them sing songs about Greek mythology—the tale of Orpheus, for example. That is difficult to do if everyone is singing a melody at the same time; thus, polyphony gave way to homophony, and early opera consisted of relatively simple melodies with texts about Greek mythology, sung in Italian and supported by simple harmonies. The important city in Italy in this development of music in the 16th century was Florence. (See also: Florentine Camerata, Vincenzo Galilei, Jacopo Peri, Claudio Monteverdi, Palestrina, Arcangelo Corelli.)

Besides Florence, two other Italian cities are particularly worthy of mention in the period around 1600. There is somewhat of a friendly rivalry between advocates of the two cities as to which one is more important in the history of the development of music in Italy. Venice justly claims its place as the birthplace of commercial opera; Naples points to its own history of church-sponsored music conservatories, institutions that developed into "feeder-systems," providing composers and performing musicians for much musical life in Italy and, indeed, Europe as a whole.(See also: Music of Venice and Music of Naples.)

== 17th century ==
The period from about 1600 to 1750 encompasses the Baroque era of music. Many important things happened in this period. One was a return to the melodic complexities of polyphony; however, the melodies ran within a modern, established system of harmony based on chords and major and minor scales. This latter element is an extension of the concept of homophonic music and allowed melodic complexity of any variance to rise to dominance over the importance of text. The struggle for dominance between text and music goes back to the music of the Greeks and is still going on in all forms of European art music and popular music. This new dominance of melody within harmony at the expense of text led to great changes, including the expansion and invention of instrumental resources of the orchestra; the keyboard was extended in both directions; the making of instruments such as those by Stradivarius became a great industry in Cremona; and instrumental music started to develop as a separate "track," quite apart from the traditional role of accompanying the human voice. Instrumental forms include such things as the sonata and fugue. Well-known and influential musical figures from this time period in Italy include Alessandro and Domenico Scarlatti, Benedetto Marcello and Antonio Vivaldi, representing the importance of Naples and Venice, respectively, within this period.

== 18th century ==
From the early 18th century to the end of that century encompasses what historians call "classical music". (Note that this use of the term "classical" does not correspond to what non-historians mean when they say "classical music"—that is, all opera and symphonic music, as opposed to "popular music".)

The term "classical" is appropriate for this period of music in that it marks the standardization of musical forms such as the symphony and concerto. Thus the term "classical" is used in the Renaissance sense of classical Greek philosophy—Platonic form, the idea that things such as beauty exist eternally as ideals, and that the artist's job—in this case, the composer's job—is put form on that ideal. Thus, we have, for example, a symphony formalized as a standard work in four movements for orchestra, and so forth.

The physical plant for composition and performance of music in Italy advanced greatly during this century. It is the period in which the great opera houses in Naples and Milano were built: the San Carlo Theater and La Scala, respectively. It is the age, as well, of the rise to prominence of the Neapolitan—and then Italian—Comic opera. Important, too, is refinding of some sense of balance between text and music in opera, largely through the librettos of Metastasio.

Important Italian composers in this century are: Giovanni Battista Pergolesi, Niccolò Piccinni, Giovanni Paisiello, Luigi Boccherini, Domenico Cimarosa, Muzio Clementi, Luigi Cherubini, Giovanni Battista Viotti and Niccolò Paganini. It is also the age in which "Italian music" became international, so to speak, with many of these Italian composers beginning to work abroad.

== 19th century ==
This is the century of Romanticism in European literature, art, and music. Romanticism in music is marked by many of the same characteristics that define that century's literature and painting: less attention to the formalities of classicism, more involvement of human passions such as love, heroism, courage, freedom, etc., all of which is a direct outgrowth of the humanism of the French Enlightenment. Italian opera tends to forsake the light-heartedness of the Comic opera for the more serious fare of Italian lyric Romanticsm. Although the ever-popular Rossini is certainly an exception to that, Italian music of the 19th century is dominated at the beginning by the likes of Bellini, Donizetti, and then, of course, for the last fifty years of the century by Giuseppe Verdi, the greatest musical icon in Italian history. It is also the time of the early career of Giacomo Puccini, perhaps the greatest composer of pure melody in the history of Italian music, and certainly the last one. Puccini is the bridge to the age of the new music of the 20th century.

== 20th century ==
Romanticism in all European music certainly held on through the turn of century. In Italy, the music of Verdi and Puccini continued to dominate for a number of years. Other Italian Romantic composers—at least composers who continued to compose in the tonal traditions of Western music (as opposed to the new atonality and dissonances of post-World War I Europe—composers who "made it" into the 20th century include Arrigo Boito, Ruggiero Leoncavallo, Pietro Mascagni, Francesco Cilea, and Ottorino Respighi.

Yet, it was inevitable that Italian composers would respond to the fading values of Romanticism and the cynicism provoked in many European artistic quarters by such things as World War I and such cultural/scientific phenomena as psychoanalysis in which—at least according to Robert Louis Stevenson—"all men have secret thoughts that would shame hell." Romanticism—in spite of its lingering popularity with opera goers—died in the First World War. Romantic music in Italy, however, cannot be said to have died under its own weight, as one might say of the overlong and over-orchestrated works of the late Romantic music in Germany that gave way to Minimalist music. But abstraction and atonality and, simply, "difficult" music did come to Italy after the death of Puccini. Among the most important Italian names in 20th-century music are Luciano Berio, Luigi Dallapiccola, Goffredo Petrassi and Luigi Nono.
