= Alec Roth =

English composer

Alec Roth (born 1948) is an English composer. He is best known for his collaboration with Vikram Seth to produce the opera Arion and the Dolphin in 1994 based on the myth of Arion.

Roth studied music from 1976 as a mature student at Durham University, having previously completed a science degree at the University of Nottingham. He earned a doctorate from Durham in 1986. His thesis was entitled New composition for Javanese gamelan.

== Works, editions and recordings ==
- California Songbook - settings of poems written by Vikram Seth when he was living on the West Coast of the US
- Sometime I Sing - settings for solo voice and guitar, including: My Lute and I; Dark Night; 3 Night Songs; Autumnal; English Folk Songs; Lights Out. Mark Padmore, Morgan Szymanski piano. Signum Records, 2013
- Earth and Sky (2000) - A choral work for children’s choir, percussion, and piano on an entirely monosyllabic text by Vikram Seth. A BBC Proms commission, it was first performed by the Finchley Children's Music Group, Joanna MacGregor (piano), and Ensemble Bash, conducted by Nicholas Wilks at Royal Albert Hall in London on July 18, 2000. According to Roth, “In keeping with the millennial theme, a piece presenting a vision of the future was requested.” Hyperion, 2023
- The Traveller (2008) – A piece for narrator, violin, and tenor soloists, choir, and orchestra on texts by Vikram Seth. It was the third in a series of four pieces by Roth and Seth that was jointly commissioned by the Salisbury, Chelsea, and Lichfield Festivals between 2006 and 2009. 2008 was the 750th anniversary year of the consecration of Salisbury Cathedral and The Traveller had its first performance there. The Traveller explores the six “Ages of Man”: unborn, child, youth, adult, old, and dead. The narrator introduces each of these six sections and an epilogue by reciting one of the seven verses of the great "Hymn to Creation" from the Rigveda. Of the music, Vikram Seth wrote, “My main reward for writing these libretti has always been the music. From the moment in the darkened cathedral that a small bell led into the first verse of the hymn to creation, I was held by the power of it.” Hyperion, 2023
- Earthrise (2009) - A choral work inspired by the photograph of the same name taken from lunar orbit in 1968, considering the positive and negative sides of the human race's mastery and control of the world. The work was commissioned by the UK choir Ex Cathedra for the 40th anniversary of its founding, which was in the same year (2009) as the 40th anniversary of the Moon landing. It was written for 40-part choir, on the model of Thomas Tallis's famous Spem in alium. Earthrise also includes an example of eye music - in the central two pages of the work, the music's layout spells out the word 'ecce' (the Latin for 'behold') as the choir sings the same word.
- A Time to Dance (2012) - An oratorio for soloists, choir and orchestra on the theme of the seasons of the year, the times of day and the stages of the human lifespan. Hyperion Records, 2016
