= Sing Up =

English organisation promoting school age singing and music making

- Formation: 2007; 19 years ago
- Purpose: Music education
- Location: England
- Website: www.singup.org

Sing Up is a music education organisation in England that promotes singing and music-making among children and young people, particularly in schools. Founded in 2007 as part of the United Kingdom government’s National Singing Programme, the initiative aimed to place singing at the centre of primary education and increase participation in vocal music across schools. Its headquarters are located in Gateshead.

The programme was launched following recommendations from the Music Manifesto, a government-supported initiative to improve access to music education, and received substantial public funding during its early years. By 2012, Sing Up had engaged with approximately 98% of primary schools in England through teaching resources, training, and national singing campaigns designed to encourage participation in classroom and community singing.

After government funding ended in 2012, Sing Up transitioned into an independent not-for-profit organisation operating through membership subscriptions and educational partnerships. The organisation provides digital teaching resources, a library of songs and classroom materials, and professional development for teachers and choir leaders in the United Kingdom and internationally. In 2017, it also launched the Sing Up Foundation, a charity focused on promoting singing as a tool for wellbeing and mental health.

== History ==
In 2007, the then Department for Education and Skills announced a £10 million investment in a national singing programme in response to the recommendations of the Music Manifesto. In 2008, the funding was extended to £40 million over four years. In March 2011, the Government announced a further £4 million funding to Sing Up for the next financial year. The aim of this investment was to help the program build a sustainable future. Between January 2009 and March 2011, Sing Up was led by a consortium of partners, made up of Youth Music with, Faber Music and The Sage Gateshead. Children's charity Youth Music was the lead partner, with music publisher Faber Music overseeing the national singing resource, including the Song Bank library, while advertising agency AMV, BBDO led a media and PR campaign highlighting the benefits of singing. The Sage Gateshead led the Workforce Development programme, which aimed to build the confidence and expertise of teachers and musicians so they could lead and support children's singing activities. Due to restrictions in the programme's funding, AMV, BBDO stepped away from their role within the Consortium in 2011. From January 2009 to March 2011, Sing Up was championed by the composer and broadcaster Howard Goodall in his role as National Singing Ambassador. In 2010 Sing Up won the RPS Award and in 2013 the programme was praised in the National Plan for Music Education.

A research study conducted in 2013 by the Institute of Education concluded that singers engaged with Sing Up are 18 months to 2 years further advanced in their singing competency than those in non-Sing Up music. Research has also shown that singing has a benefit in language development, learning retention, motor skills and music development. Since 2009 Sing Up have worked with over 86,000 singers, 98% of English Primary Schools and SEN Schools and PRU (pupil referral units) with over 8,000 music practitioners. The website holds over 2,000 resources. Over 1,730 schools have achieved a Sing Up Award: 831 Silver, 565 Gold and 134 Platinum. Over 57,000 people have taken part in Sing Up training and professional development.

In April 2012, Sing Up became a not-for-profit organisation offering a membership scheme designed for schools, freelance music teachers and organisations, available internationally from 2016. In 2017 Sing Up was shortlisted in the category of Best Digital/Technological Resource in the Music Teacher Awards for Excellence. In 2018 Sing Up won the Music Teacher Editors Award at the annual Music Teacher Awards for Excellence.

In 2017, Sing Up launched the Sing Up Foundation, a charity aiming to promote singing as an aid to mental health and wellbeing.

== Resources ==
Sing Up's website and resources are aimed at providing teachers and music leaders access to cross-curricular singing resources for use in and out of the classroom. The organisation have launched a membership scheme for schools, individuals and organisations. Each package is made up of songs, resources, training and support to help provide singing opportunities for primary-aged children. Previously limited by funding restrictions to users in mainland England, Sing Up is now available across the UK and internationally where users can either purchase Membership or access a free Friends' account.

- The Song Bank is a resource of over 800 songs and warm-ups in an online learning space. Arranged specifically for children's voices, the songs range from choral classics to pop hits, each with accompanying resources including sheet music, audio tracks, curriculum-linked teaching activities and SEN resources.
- Teaching Tools and Advice is a set of over 2000 resources for teachers and music practitioners, including how-tos and guides, lesson plans and topic plans, monthly Assembly Plans, cross-curricular activity plans, a multimedia guide to vocal health, seasonal activity packs and a Quality Framework.
- Tutorial Videos: the Sing Up website and YouTube channels host over 180 tutorial videos providing multimedia support, including how to gain a Sing Up Award, lesson plans for teaching songs and Makaton and BSL sign-along videos.
- The Sing Up Magazine is a termly publication sent directly to member schools offering topic and lesson plans, teaching guides, advice, ideas and support, plus a CD of 10 songs per issue.
- Sing Up Awards recognise schools who put promote singing in school life. There are three different levels: Gold, Silver and Platinum.
- Accessible Learning (previously known as Beyond the Mainstream) aims to reach children who are educated in settings outside of mainstream education (SEN, Short Stay School or Pupil Referral Unit), or for children who attend primary mainstream schools but face accessing or attending (including looked-after children, children with special needs and refugee children). This strand of work aims to explore, develop and disseminate good practice, supporting and learning from the children and workforce in these settings. Sing Up's Accessible Learning incorporates specialist resources and integrated support for Autism, challenging behaviour, looked after children, Signed Song, Assistive Technologies and Makaton.

== Training and development ==
Sing Up run online training Webinars, where users log on and join a live audience via a video stream. The live and online audiences interact through instant messaging and social media, and can take part in a live web chat with the vocal leader following the session.

To help improve and enhance the quality of singing and singing leadership in schools and other settings, and to inspire singing leaders to reflect upon their practice and consider ways to develop it, Sing Up have also developed the Principles of Good Quality Vocal Leadership.
