= Music for Strings, Trumpets, and Percussion =

Bacewicz composition

Music for Strings, Trumpets, and Percussion is a three-movement piece completed in 1958 by Grażyna Bacewicz. The work was premiered in 1959 at Warsaw Autumn, a contemporary music festival. It is one of Bacewicz's most well-known compositions.

== Analysis ==
=== Structure ===
The piece is divided into three movements:

1. Allegro
2. Adagio
3. Vivace

The first movement begins in 4/4 time and frequently changes time signatures. It opens with agitated sixteenth-note figures layered throughout the string section, creating a discordant and complex texture. Despite being comprised largely of dissonant motifs and clashing harmonies, the movement takes on a more lively quality through jazz-like syncopations in a second musical idea. A slower, two-voice string idea briefly emerges, followed by a return to a more lively third section which features a heavy use of staccato. A new development is introduced, followed by recapitulations of previous themes in reverse order. Finally, the movement concludes with a fanfare.

The second movement contrasts the energetic character of the first movement with a mysterious, expressive spirit. It begins with an ostinato figure in the violins, which serves as a backdrop for a solo viola and solo double bass duo. As more instruments enter, the movement builds to a climax of emotional intensity, which gives way to an eerie section marked by sustained trills and sparse celesta attacks. Extremely high semitonal string passages, a trumpet sigh, and references to the opening ostinato rhythm bring the movement to a bleak, desolate close.

The third movement is in sonata-rondo form and serves as a vibrant finale to the piece. It features the first appearance of the xylophone, as well as returns to melodic and rhythmic elements from the previous two movements.

A standard performance of Music for Strings, Trumpets, and Percussion lasts around 20 minutes.

=== Style ===
Bacewicz frequently wrote in the neoclassical style, a musical movement emphasizing the classical Greek and Roman aesthetic ideals of order and clarity in contrast to the freedom of the Romantic period. Music for Strings, Trumpets and Percussion is not as overtly neoclassical as some of Bacewicz's other works, but retains some suggestions of the style. For example, frequent juxtapositions of solo instruments and larger groups hint at the concerto grosso form.

Although the title and instrumentation of the piece are similar to Music for Strings, Percussion, and Celesta, a 1937 composition by Béla Bártok, Bacewicz's composition aligns more with the neoclassical style than Bartók's. Stylistically, it exhibits influence from Stravinsky, another neoclassical composer. It can also be viewed as a reworking of Bacewicz's own Concerto for String Orchestra.

== Instrumentation ==
The work is scored for the following:

Brass

5 trumpets in C

Percussion

Celesta
Xylophone
Snare drum
Timpani

Strings

2 first and 2 second violins
2 violas
2 cellos
1 double bass

== Reception ==
Music for Strings, Trumpets, and Percussion was premiered on September 14, 1959 at Warsaw Autumn by the Polish National Radio Symphony Orchestra under the baton of Jan Krenz. In 1960, the piece won first prize in the orchestral division and third prize overall in UNESCO's International Rorstrum of Composers. Music for Strings, Trumpets, and Percussion is one of the best-known and most widely performed of Bacewicz's compositions.

== Notable recordings ==
- Ronald Corp and the New London Orchestra (2009)
- Nicholas Collon and the Finnish Radio Symphony Orchestra (2023)
