= Herbert Heyner =

British singer

Herbert Heyner in 1922

Herbert Heyner (26 June 1882 – 18 January 1954) was a noted English baritone. Heyner appeared in a handful of operas, and a number of broadcast operas, but his stage appearances were predominantly in oratorio and songs. He sang in some notable performances of Sir Edward Elgar's oratorios under the composer's baton. He sang in Britain, France, Germany, the United States and Canada, and he sang at The Proms 59 times between 1909 and 1937, in songs and operatic arias.

== Career ==
The Queen's Hall in 1912; Heyner made his first important appearance here in 1907

Herbert Augustus Otto Heyner was born in London on 26 June 1882. He was a choirboy at St Botolph's Aldersgate, making his debut in that capacity in 1892; he was also accepted for Lincoln's Inn Chapel. He studied at Brighton House School and it was planned that he would become an actuary, but music had a greater pull on him, and he studied singing with Frederic King in London, Victor Maurel in Paris, and Karl Scheidemantel in Dresden. Maurel had believed Heyner's true range was that of a bass, but it proved to be baritone.

His first important appearance was in 1907, at the Queen's Hall. On 27 May 1911 the London Music Festival closed with a performance of Bach's St Matthew Passion, with Heyner, Gervase Elwes, Robert Radford and Agnes Nicholls, under Sir Henry Wood's baton. In 1912 he and the soprano Muriel Foster sang in a series of concerts at Queen's Hall with the London Symphony Orchestra, led by Arthur Nikisch, Willem Mengelberg and Hamilton Harty.

At the start of the First World War, he volunteered along with many other musicians, artists and writers to join the United Arts Rifles. He was appointed temporary Second Lieutenant on 22 May 1915. He saw active service and was seriously wounded in 1916, but recovered and had risen to the rank of Captain by the end of the war.

Heyner returned to the stage in 1919. For the British National Opera Company he appeared at Covent Garden in five performances of Wagner's Parsifal in May 1922, along with Louise Kirkby Lunn, Walter Hyde, Clarence Whitehill, Percy Heming, Norman Allin and others, under conductors such as Percy Pitt and Eugène Goossens.

== Heyner and Elgar ==
Herbert Heyner had a significant association with Sir Edward Elgar. He sang in three notable performances of Elgar's oratorio The Apostles under the composer's direction, in 1922, 1925 and 1926, at the Three Choirs Festivals in Gloucester and Worcester, along with soloists Agnes Nicholls, Astra Desmond, Horace Stevens, Norman Allin, John Coates and Olga Haley. He also sang the work on other occasions, as well as the oratorio The Kingdom.

He recorded Elgar's The Dream of Gerontius under the composer's baton, with Margaret Balfour, Steuart Wilson and the Royal Choral Society, taken from a live performance at the Royal Albert Hall on 26 February 1927. Heyner's aria "Go, in the name of Angels and Archangels" later appeared on the HMV anthology "Great British Basses and Baritones". He also sang the work on other occasions: on 11 March 1925 with Astra Desmond and Hubert Eisdell, under the conductor Sir Henry Coward.

== Later career ==
On 23 March 1922, at the Queen's Hall in London, Herbert Heyner sang in Beethoven's Choral Symphony with Amy Evans, Phyllis Lett and Arthur Jordan, with the Royal Philharmonic Orchestra under Albert Coates, in the same concert as the world premiere of Frederick Delius's Requiem. On 11 November 1923, he was one of the soloists in the world premiere of John Foulds' A World Requiem in the Royal Albert Hall under the composer's direction. He also sang at the Théâtre des Champs-Élysées in Paris in 1923.

In 1925 he appeared in Dame Ethel Smyth's Mass in D at the Albert Hall, with Caroline Hatchard, Astra Desmond and Archibald Winter, under Malcolm Sargent's baton.

Heyner toured the United States and Canada in 1928, giving the New York premiere of Delius's Sea Drift. He also sang in North America in 1929 and 1930. At the Proms on 4 September 1930, he gave the first concert performance of Dame Ethel Smyth's Ode anacréontique, with the BBC Symphony Orchestra under the composer.

In 1936, Herbert Heyner appeared alongside Muriel Brunskill, Norman Walker and Victor Harding in a presentation of Wagner's Parsifal for the BBC under Sir Henry Wood.

He retired in 1945 due to illness. He wrote a book of memoirs, A Singer Looks Back.

He died in Saxmundham, Suffolk on 18 January 1954, aged 71.

== Dedications ==
Maurice Besly's 1922 song "An Epitaph", to words by Walter de la Mare, was dedicated to Herbert Heyner.

Charles Wood's song "The Fox" was also dedicated to Heyner.

== Personal life ==
In 1910 Heyner married the Savoyard contralto Bertha Lewis, who died in May 1931 after being involved in a car accident. He did not attend the funeral. In June 1931 he married Mary Louise Hamilton (1902–1973), with whom he had two daughters, Susan, born in 1936 and Diana, born in 1937.
