= Eva Heinitz =

German musician

- Born: 1907
- Died: 2001 (aged 93–94)
- Occupation: cellist

Eva Heinitz (February 2, 1907 – April 1, 2001) was a German musician, best known as a cellist but also highly acclaimed for her recordings on the viola da gamba. Heinitz, who was "half Jewish", left her native Berlin after the Nazis came to power, living first in France and later the United States, where she joined the faculty of the University of Washington in Seattle in 1948.

Heinitz was considered for some time to be an authority on the viola da gamba (especially regarding pieces written for the instrument by Johann Sebastian Bach), though it was a title she immensely disliked. Heinitz remained active late into her life, and continued teaching and giving occasional interviews until her death.

In 1931, in Berlin, she gave the premiere of the Cello Sonata by John Foulds.

While at the University of Washington, Heinitz was an excellent (and patient) teacher who introduced young Americans to the joys of early music and the viola da gamba. In 1964 she took on a group of students from Dr. Wallace Goleeke's Ingraham High School Madrigal Singers, teaching them to play in a viol ensemble of soprano, alto, tenor, and bass Renaissance instruments.
