= John Foulds =

English composer and cellist (1880–1939)

- Born: 2 November 1880; Hulme, Manchester, England
- Died: 25 April 1939 (aged 58); Calcutta, India
- Occupations: Cellist; Composer
- Organizations: Hallé Orchestra; All-India Radio

John Herbert Foulds (/foʊldz/; 2 November 1880 – 25 April 1939) was an English cellist and composer of classical music. He was largely self-taught as a composer, and belongs among the figures of the English Musical Renaissance.

A successful composer of light music and theatre scores, he directed his principal creative energies into more ambitious and exploratory works that were particularly influenced by Indian music. Suffering a setback after the decline in popularity of his World Requiem (1919–1921), he left London for Paris in 1927, and eventually travelled to India in 1935 where, among other things, he collected folk music, composed pieces for traditional Indian instrument ensembles, and worked in radio and became Director of All India Radio in Delhi in 1937.

Foulds' works include Three Mantras for orchestra and wordless chorus (1919–1930), Essays in the Modes for piano (1920–1927), the piano concerto Dynamic Triptych (1927–1929), and his ninth string quartet Quartetto Intimo (1931–1932).

== Biography ==
John Foulds was born in Hulme, Manchester, England, on 2 November 1880, the son of a bassoonist in the Hallé Orchestra. Prolific from childhood, Foulds himself joined the Hallé as a cellist in 1900, having already served an apprenticeship in theatre and promenade orchestras in England and abroad. Hans Richter gave him conducting experience; Henry Wood took up some of his works, starting with Epithalamium at the 1906 Queen's Hall Proms.

In some respects ahead of his time (he started using quarter-tones as early as the 1890s, while some of his later works anticipate Messiaen and Minimalism), Foulds was in others an intensely practical musician. He became a successful composer of light music – his Keltic Lament was once a popular favourite and in the 1920s the BBC scheduled his music on a daily basis. This was a source of irritation to Foulds; in 1933 he complained to Adrian Boult at the BBC that his serious music was not being performed: "[My light works] number a dozen or so, as compared with the total of 50 of my serious works. This state of affairs is rather a galling one for a serious artist." Foulds also wrote many effective theatre scores, notably for his friends Lewis Casson and Sybil Thorndike. Perhaps the best known was the music for the first production of Shaw's Saint Joan (Foulds conducted a Suite from it at the Queen's Hall Proms in 1925). He also wrote the score for Casson's highly successful West End production of Shakespeare's Henry VIII, which ran from December 1925 to March 1926. However, his principal creative energies went into more ambitious and exploratory works, often coloured by his interest in the music of the East, especially India.

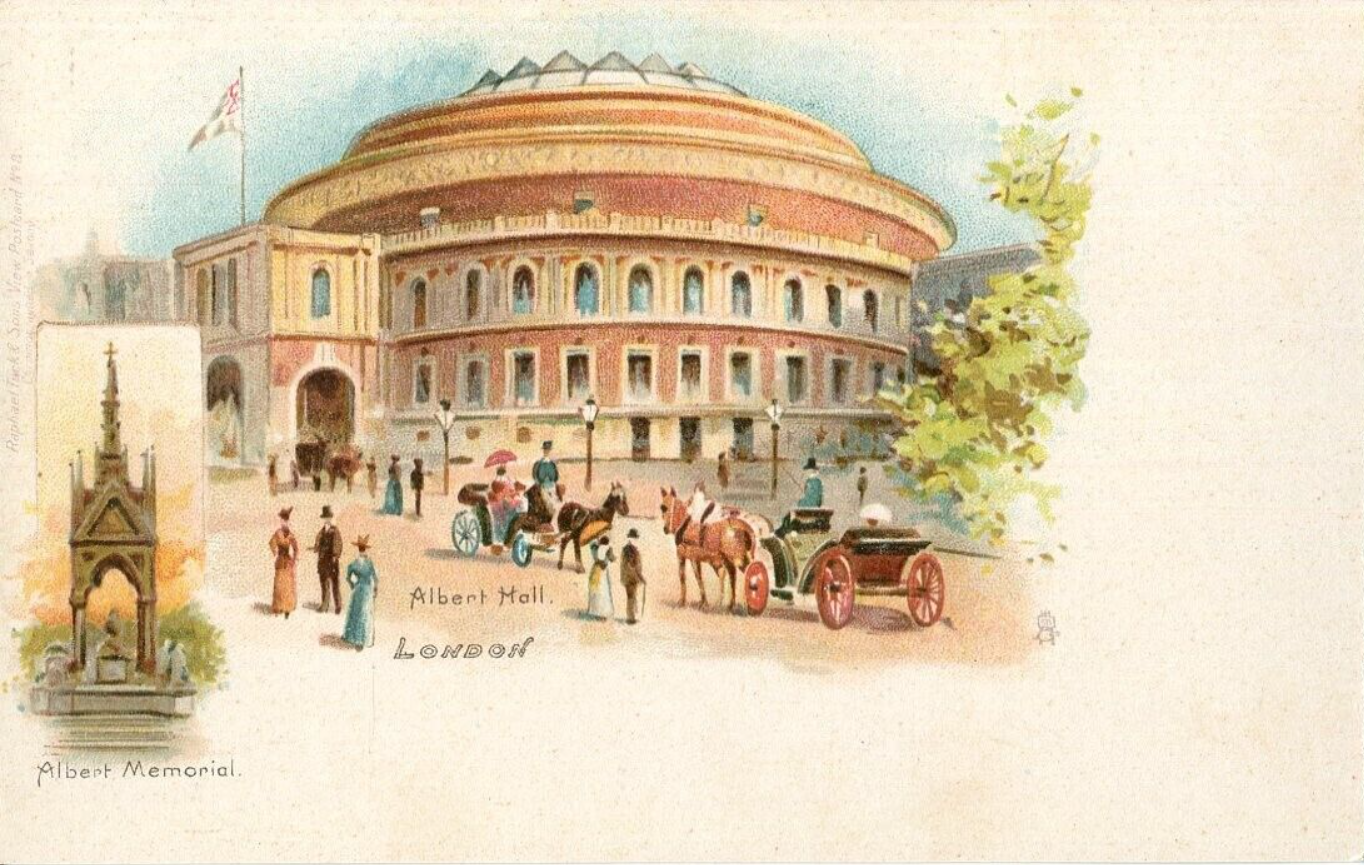
A postcard of the Royal Albert Hall (c.1903) (with an inset of the Albert Memorial), where Foulds' World Requiem (1919–1921) was performed in 1923 and 1926; in 1924 and 1925 it was performed at the Queen's Hall.

Foulds moved to London before World War I, and in 1915 during the war he met the violinist Maud MacCarthy, one of the leading Western authorities on Indian music. His gigantic World Requiem (1919–1921), in memory of the dead of all nations, was performed at the Royal Albert Hall, conducted by Foulds, under the auspices of The Royal British Legion on Armistice Night, 11 November, in 1923 by up to 1,250 instrumentalists and singers; the latter were called the Cenotaph choir. Performances in 1924 and 1925 took place at the Queen's Hall. In 1926 it returned to the Albert Hall, but this was to be the last performance until 2007, again at the Albert Hall. The performances in 1923–26 constituted the first Festivals of Remembrance. While some critics were not impressed by the work, it was nonetheless popular. One newspaper wrote: "The scope of the work is beyond what anyone has dared to attempt hitherto. It is no less than to find expression for the deepest and most widespread unhappiness this generation has ever known. As such it was received by a very large number of listeners, who evidently felt that music alone could do this for them." However, the work ceased to be performed after 1926. Some commentators have suggested a conspiracy against Foulds – his biographer Malcolm MacDonald has, for instance, implied some sort of "intrigue". It appears Foulds was regarded as an inappropriate composer for the occasion because he had not fought in the war, or because of his suspected Left-wing views.

When interest in the World Requiem lapsed, Foulds suffered a grave setback and in 1927 left for Paris, working there as an accompanist for silent films. Here, he was acquainted with the Irish-American composer Swan Hennessy with whom he shared an interest in musical Celticism. In 1934 he published a book on contemporary musical developments, Music To-day. In 1935 he travelled to India, where he collected folk music, became Director of European Music for All-India Radio in Delhi, created an orchestra from scratch, and began to work towards his dream of a musical synthesis of East and West, actually composing pieces for ensembles of traditional Indian instruments. He was so successful that he was asked to open a branch of the radio station in Calcutta. However, within a week of arriving there, he died of cholera on 25 April 1939. Foulds was responsible for banning the use of the harmonium on Indian music broadcast on radio.

He published a series of four articles titled The Present and Future of Music in India in 1936-1937. The articles covered harmony, orchestration, and notation and appeared in The Music Magazine, published under the patronage of Vijayadevji.

Foulds' most substantial compositions include string quartets, symphonic poems, concertos, piano pieces and a huge "concert opera" on Dante's The Divine Comedy (1905–1908), as well as a series of "Music-Pictures" exploring the affinities between music and styles of painting. (Henry Wood introduced one of them at the 1913 Proms.) Few of these works were performed and fewer published in his lifetime, and several, especially from his last period in India, are lost. (The missing scores included a Symphony of East and West for Oriental instruments and Western symphony orchestra.) Foulds' daughter deposited some of the surviving manuscripts by her father in the British Library.

== Revival ==
Foulds became a footnote to English music after his death, but from 1974 Malcolm MacDonald, editor of the music journal Tempo under the alias Calum MacDonald, conducted an often lonely campaign for Foulds after he came across the Foulds scores deposited in the British Library. MacDonald tracked down Foulds' daughter, who took him to a garage and showed him two coffin-sized boxes full of sketches and manuscripts she had been left by her mother. Unfortunately, many of the manuscripts were damaged: apparently, rats and ants had got at them while they were in India, where Foulds' wife stayed after his death.

An acclaimed recording of Foulds' string quartet music, including the previously unperformed Quartetto Intimo, by the Endellion Quartet in the early 1980s, began to reawaken interest in him, and this was sustained in the early 1990s by Lyrita Recorded Edition's decision to issue some of Foulds' works including Three Mantras and Dynamic Triptych on CD. A Proms performance of Three Mantras in 1998 was well received, and soon after the Finnish conductor Sakari Oramo began to champion Foulds' work in concerts with the City of Birmingham Symphony Orchestra (CBSO), to huge critical acclaim. In November 2005, the CBSO, with Peter Donohoe, gave the first live performance for more than 70 years of Foulds' piano concerto, the Dynamic Triptych (1927–1929). The orchestra has issued two well-received CDs of Foulds' music. On Armistice Night, 11 November 2007, the Royal Albert Hall staged the first performance for 81 years of the World Requiem under the auspices of the BBC, with the Trinity Boys Choir and Leon Botstein as conductor. The performance was recorded live and released in Super Audio CD format by Chandos Records in January 2008.

Foulds' Keltic Lament has once again become popular due to its regular playing on Classic FM, and BBC Radio 3 plans to revive a tradition of performing A World Requiem on Armistice Day.

=== Personal life ===
John Foulds was only 21 when he married librarian Dora Woodcock in 1902. She was seven years his senior and the daughter of a Yorkshire-born bookseller who had settled in Llandudno. Their son Michael Raymond was born in Manchester in 1911.

Foulds met his musical soul mate Maud MacCarthy in 1915, after moving to London. She was married to William Mann, with whom she had a daughter Joan, born in 1913.

According to Malcolm MacDonald's account, both were in unhappy marriages and it was love at first sight. Rather than enter into a clandestine affair, they laid the matter before their respective spouses. The two couples met together and agreed amicably on the divorces that would allow John and Maud to marry, though they did not in fact do so until 1932. They were to have two children: John Patrick born in 1916 and a daughter Marybride (later Marybride Watt) in 1922.

== Works ==
=== Choral/Vocal with Orchestra ===
- The Vision of Dante, a "concert opera" on Dante's Divina Commedia (The Divine Comedy) in the translation by Longfellow, Op. 7
- Lyra Celtica, concerto for wordless mezzo-soprano and orchestra, Op. 50 (unfinished; the two completed movements have been recorded)
- A World Requiem, based on texts from the Bible, John Bunyan, Kabir and other sources, Op. 60 (1923)

=== Orchestral ===
- Undine: Suite d'Orchestre, Op. 3 (1898)
- Epithalamium, Op. 10
- The Vision of Dante Prelude (1908)
- Holiday Sketches, Op. 16 (1908)
- Mirage, Op. 20
- Suite Française, Op. 22 (1910)
- Keltic Overture, Op. 28 (1930)
- Keltic Suite, Op. 29 (includes the Keltic Lament)
- Music-Pictures Group III, Op. 33
- Miniature Suite, Op. 38 (arr. from Wonderful Grandmama) (1913)
- Hellas: A Suite of Ancient Greece for double string orchestra, harp and percussion, Op. 45
- April – England, Op. 48, No. 1
- Isles of Greece, Op. 48, No. 2 (1927)
- Music Pictures Group IV for string orchestra, Op. 55
- Three Mantras from Avatara, Op. 61B
- A Gaelic Dream Song, Op. 68 (1922)
- Le Cabaret Overture, Op. 72A (arr. from Deburau) (1925)
- Suite Fantastique, Op. 72B (arr. from Deburau) (1924)
- Music Pictures Group VI: Gaelic Melodies, Op. 81 (1924)
- Saint Joan Suite, Op. 82 (1925)
- Henry VIII Suite, Op. 87 (1926)
- Sicilian Aubade (1927)
- Puppet Ballet Suite (1934)
- Carnival (1934)
- Deva-Music, Op. 94 (fragments)
- Chinese Suite, Op. 95 (1935)
- Indian Suite (1935)
- Kashmiri Wedding Procession (1936)
- Scene Picaresque (Spanish Serenade) (1936)
- An Arabian Night (1937)
- Basque Serenade (1938)
- Kashmiri Boat Song (1938)
- Grand Durbar March (1938)
- Pasquinades Symphoniques, Op. 98 (unfinished; the two completed movements have been recorded)
- Symphony of East and West, Op. 100 (lost)
- Symphonic Studies for string orchestra, Op. 101 (lost)

=== Concertante ===
- Lento e Scherzetto for cello and orchestra, Op. 12 (1906)
- Cello Concerto in G major, Op. 17
- Apotheosis for violin and orchestra, Op. 18 (in memory of Joseph Joachim)
- Piano Concerto Dynamic Triptych, Op. 88

=== Chamber ===
- String Quartet No. 4 in F minor (1899) (According to Malcolm MacDonald, Foulds wrote ten quartets, five of them before 1900, but did not give any of them numbers. The numbering used here is MacDonald's. Apparently only Nos. 4, 6, 8 and 9 survive complete.)
- String Quartet No. 6 Quartetto Romantico (1903)
- Cello Sonata, Op. 6 (1905, rev. 1927)
- String Quartet No. 8 in D minor, Op. 23
- String Trio, Op. 24 (only the second movement, Ritornello con Variazioni, survives complete)
- Two Concert Pieces for cello and piano, Op. 25
- Music Pictures Group II: Aquarelles for string quartet, Op. 32
- Ballade and Refrain Rococo for violin and piano, Op. 40, No. 1 (1914)
- Caprice Pompadour for violin and piano, Op. 42, No. 2
- Greek Processional for string quintet
- String Quartet No. 9 Quartetto Intimo, Op. 89
- String Quartet No. 10 Quartetto Geniale (only one movement Lento Quieto survives complete)
- About a dozen short pieces for an "Indo-European Ensemble" of traditional instruments (mostly fragmentary)

=== Piano ===
- Dichterliebe Suite (1897–1898, unfinished)
- Variazioni ed Improvvisati su una Thema Originale, Op. 4 (1900)
- Five Recollections of Ancient Greek Music (original version of Hellas)
- English Tune with Burden, Op. 89 (1914)
- Music Pictures Group VI: Gaelic Melodies, Op. 81 (1924)
  1. The Dream of Morven
  2. Deirdre Crooning
  3. Merry Macdoon
- April – England, Op. 48, No. 1 (1926)
- Gandharva-Music, Op. 49
- Music Pictures Group VII: Landscapes, Op. 13 (1927)
  1. Moonrise: Sorrento (after Morelli)
  2. Nightfall: Luxor (after Cameron)
- Essays in the Modes, Op. 78 (1928)
  1. Exotic (Mode II A)
  2. Ingenuous (Mode V K)
  3. Introversive (Mode II C)
  4. Military (Mode V E)
  5. Strophic (Mode V L)
  6. Prismic (Mode II P)
- Egoistic (Mode V L)
- Persian Love Song (1935)

=== Choral/Vocal ===
- Three Songs of Beauty for tenor and piano, Op. 11 (texts by Byron and Edgar Allan Poe)
- Five Mood Pictures for voice and piano, Op. 51 (texts by "Fiona MacLeod")
- Two Songs in "Sacrifice" for voice and string quintet, Op. 66 (texts by Rabindranath Tagore; also performable with violins and tambura)
- Three Songs for Voice and Piano, Op. 69 (texts by Longfellow and Griffin)
- Five Scottish-Keltic Songs for mixed chorus, Op. 70 (various texts)
- Three Choruses in the Hippolytus of Euripides for women's chorus with mezzo-soprano and piano, Op. 84B
- Garland of Youth, song-cycle Op. 86 (various texts)
- The Seven Ages, monologue with text by Shakespeare, for baritone and piano
- English Madrigals for unaccompanied voices (c. 1933)

=== Incidental music ===
- Wonderful Grandmama (Harold Chapin), Op. 34
- The Whispering Well (Rose), Op. 35
- Julius Caesar (Shakespeare), Op. 39
- Sakuntala (Kālidāsa), Op. 64
- The Trojan Women (Euripides), Op. 65
- Veils (Maud MacCarthy), Op. 70
- Deburau (Sacha Guitry), Op. 72
- The Goddess (Nirjan Pal), Op. 75
- The Fires Divine (Rosaleen Valmer), Op. 76
- The Cenci (Shelley), Op. 77
- Cymbeline (Shakespeare), Op. 80
- Saint Joan (George Bernard Shaw), Op. 82
- Masses and Man (Ernst Toller), Op. 83
- Hippolytus (Euripides), Op. 84
- The Dance of Life (Hermon Ould), Op. 85
- Henry VIII (Shakespeare), Op. 87
- The Merry Wives of Windsor (Shakespeare) (1932)
- Dear Brutus (J. M. Barrie) (1934)

=== Arrangements ===
- Borodin, Serenade, Op. 5, No. 5, arranged for small orchestra
- Glazunov, Meditation, Op. 32, arranged for small orchestra
- Glazunov, Serenade Espagnole, Op. 20, arranged for small orchestra
- Schubert, String Quartet in D minor, D 810 (Death and the Maiden), transcribed as a symphony (1930)

== Discography ==
- Dynamic Triptych; Music-Pictures III; April-England; The Song of Ram Dass; Keltic Lament. Peter Donohoe, CBSO, Oramo, Warner Classics 2564 62999-2
- Dynamic Triptych. Howard Shelley (piano), Royal Philharmonic Orchestra, Vernon Handley, Lyrita SRCD 211
- Le Cabaret; April-England; Pasquinade; Three Mantras; Hellas. LPO, Barry Wordsworth, Lyrita SRCD 212
- Three Mantras; Lyra Celtica; Apotheosis; Mirage. Susan Bickley (mezzo), Daniel Hope (violin), CBSO, Oramo, Warner Classics 2564 61525-2
- April-England. Academy of St Martin in the Fields, Sir Neville Marriner, Philips 454 444–2
- Keltic Lament. New London Orchestra, Ronald Corp, Hyperion CDA 67400
- String Quartets: (Quartetto Intimo, Op.89, Quartetto Geniale, Op.97: Aquarelles). Endellion String Quartet, Pearl SHE CD 9564
- Piano Music, including Essays in the Modes. Kathryn Stott, BIS-CD-933
- April-England (piano version); Gandharva-Music. Juan José Chuquisengo (piano), Sony SK93829
- Essays in the Modes; Variazioni ed Improvvisati; English Tune; Gandharva-Music; April-England. Peter Jacobs, piano, Altarus AIR-CD-9001
- Cello Concerto in G major. Raphael Wallfisch (cello), Bournemouth Symphony Orchestra, Martin Yates, Dutton Epoch CDLX 7284
- John Foulds: Vol. 1 – Keltic Overture; Keltic Suite; Sicilian Aubade (Allegretto); Isles of Greece; Holiday Sketches; An Arabian Night; Suite Fantastique. BBC Concert Orchestra, Ronald Corp, Dutton Epoch CDLX 7252
- John Foulds: Vol. 2 – Music-Pictures Group VI, Op.81 (Gaelic Melodies); The Florida Spiritual, Op.71 no.1; La Belle Pierrette; Derby and Joan, Op.42 no.1 (An Old English Idyll); Music-Pictures Group IV, Op.55; Strophes from an Antique Song; Indian Suite; Henry VIII Suite; Suite Française. BBC Concert Orchestra, Corp, Dutton Epoch CDLX 7260
- John Foulds: Vol. 3 – Undine: Suite d'Orchestre; Kashmiri Boat Song; Chinese Suite; A Gaelic Dream-Song; Basque Serenade; Kashmiri Wedding Procession; Miniature Suite; Scène Picaresque (Spanish Serenade); Gipsy Czárdás (Tzigeuner); Kashmiri Boat Song on Jhelum River. Cynthia Fleming (violin), BBC Concert Orchestra, Corp, Dutton Epoch CDLX 7307
- John Foulds: Vol. 4 – Carnival (ca. 1934), The Vision of Dante Prelude (1905–08); Lento e Scherzetto for cello and orchestra Op.12 (1906) (cello solo: Benjamin Hughes); Saint Joan Suite Op.82 (1924 arr. 1925); Hippolytus Prelude Op.84 No.1 (1925) (oboe solo: Bethany Akers); Puppet Ballet Suite (1932–34); Badinage (1936); Grand Durbar March (1937–38). BBC Concert Orchestra, Corp, Dutton Epoch CDLX 7311

== Bibliography ==
=== Books ===
- Foulds, John (1934). Music To-day: Its Heritage from the Past, and Legacy to the Future (Opus 92). London: Nicholson & Watson.
- MacDonald, Malcolm (1975). John Foulds: His Life in Music: with a Detailed Catalogue of His Works, a Discography, a Bibliographical Note, and with Music Examples and Illustrations. Rickmansworth, Herts.: Triad Press. ISBN 0-902070-15-0.
- MacDonald, Malcolm (1989). John Foulds and His Music: An Introduction. White Plains, N.Y.; London: Pro/Am Music Resources. ISBN 0-912483-02-4. Includes a short anthology of Foulds' writings.

=== Articles ===
- Fanning, David (10 November 2005). "Feast for Musical Connoisseurs". The Daily Telegraph. Archived from the original on 10 September 2006.
- Norris, Geoffrey (12 January 2006). "The Sound of Illumination (review of the City of Birmingham Symphony Orchestra at the Symphony Hall, Birmingham, 11 January 2006)". The Daily Telegraph. Archived from the original on 30 December 2006.
- Culshaw, Peter (26 April 2006). "Visionary Genius of the Spirit World". The Daily Telegraph. Archived from the original on 19 June 2006.
- Oramo, Sakari (28 April 2006). "The forgotten man". The Guardian.
- Heffer, Simon (31 March 2007). "Composition for 1,250 Musicians". The Daily Telegraph. Archived from the original on 7 December 2007.
- Ward, David (1 November 2007). "The spine-tingler : Audiences loved John Foulds' 1921 requiem for the first world war, but the piece fell out of favour". The Guardian.
- Duchen, Jessica (7 November 2007). "Composer John Foulds : The lost requiem : Branded a coward, labelled a communist, dismissed by his peers, forgotten by the critics. Now, finally rediscovered, the genius of John Foulds". The Independent. Archived from the original on 9 November 2007.
- Hewett, Ivan (8 November 2007). "John Foulds : The forgotten man of music : As John Foulds's 'World Requiem' is performed for the first time in 82 years, the composer's son talks to Ivan Hewett". The Daily Telegraph. Archived from the original on 13 November 2007.
- Brown, Geoff (9 November 2007). "Requiem for a lost composer : John Foulds's great lament for the First World War dead is back after 70 years". The Times. London.
- Hewett, Ivan (12 November 2007). "World Requiem comes alive after 81-year wait". The Daily Telegraph. Archived from the original on 12 November 2007.
