= Cello Sonata (Foulds) =

Sonata for cello and piano by John Foulds

- by John Foulds
- Opus: 6
- Composed: 1905, revised 1927
- Performed: 1931, Berlin
- Published: 1927, Paris
- Movements: 3

John Foulds composed his Cello Sonata, Op. 6, in 1905, and revised it in 1927 while living in Paris where it was first published. The premiere was played in Berlin in 1931 by Eva Heinitz and an unknown pianist. The cello sonata features advanced and original techniques, such as quarter-tones, but it is not certain that they already appeared in the early version. Calum MacDonald described the sonata as powerful and original, and rated it as "one of the finest, if not the finest Cello Sonata by an English composer".

== History ==
Foulds, a professional cellist, completed the first version of the Cello Sonata early in his career in 1905. It features some elements that were radical at the time, but they could also have been introduced in a revision in 1927, produced when the composer lived in Paris, in preparation for publication there. The original score is lost, therefore it is uncertain which pioneering material was already present in the first version which was composed before Debussy's well-known work. Foulds wrote detailed program notes. The first version was probably not performed, but the revised version was premiered in Berlin in 1931 by Eva Heinitz and an unknown pianist. The probably first performance in the UK was played by Moray Welsh and Ronald Stevenson at London's Purcell Room in 1975.

== Structure and music ==
The sonata is in the traditional three movements:

1. Moderato quasi allegretto
2. Lento
3. Molto brio

=== I. Moderato quasi allegretto ===
The first movement as structured in a "foreshortened sonata form". Foulds wrote in his program notes that some motifs contain "traces of two old English Puritan tunes which had been in the composer's mind since early boyhood". One of them is the first theme of the first movement, a simple and memorable tune, in "harmonic sophistication". The second theme is another singable "Puritan tune". The development section has been described as turbulent. The recapitulation begins, without the first theme, with the second theme now in G major, leading to a dramatic climax. In a coda, the first theme appears again, first in the bass, then rising to a "slashing" ending.

=== II. Lento ===
The expansive second movement begins with guitar-like pizzicato arpeggios in the unaccompanied cello. The tonality moves from D minor to D major. The writing for the cello shows Fould's knowledge of cello techniques. For the first time in his extant works, Fould used quarter-tones in this movement. Foulds, who later claimed to have used quarter-tones already in 1898, wrote later:

It must be understood that the quarter-tone as here used has nothing whatsoever to do with those "microtones" with which Eastern musicians are wont to embellish their modal melodies. It is an indigenous growth, offspring of the Bach equal-tempered scale.

The movement ends in "seraphically rising harmonics".

=== III. Molto brio ===
The final movement features pedal notes, culminating in a coda over a ground bass, presenting the main themes in imaginative counterpoint. A reviewer of Gramophone noted the work's "striking thematic material". Calum MacDonald summarised that the sonata was "powerful and original … one of the finest, if not the finest Cello Sonata by an English composer".

== Recordings ==
The sonata was recorded in 1998 by cellist Jo Cole and pianist John Talbot, in a collection of cello sonatas by neglected English composers which also includes works by Ernest Walker and York Bowen. The sonata was recorded again in 2012 by Paul Watkins and Huw Watkins as part of a collection of British music for cello and piano, combined with cello sonatas by Hubert Parry and Frederick Delius.
