= A World Requiem =

Composition by John Foulds

A World Requiem, Op. 60 is a large-scale symphonic work with soloists and choirs by the British composer John Foulds. Written as a requiem and using forces similar in scale to Gustav Mahler's Eighth Symphony, the work calls for a full symphony orchestra, soloists, massed choirs including children's choirs, offstage instrumentalists and an organ.

Foulds wrote the work between 1919 and 1921, and conceived it as a memorial to the dead of all nations in the wake of the First World War. The text (in English), assembled by his wife Maud MacCarthy, to whom the score is dedicated, is not liturgical, though it uses sections of the Requiem Mass plus several other Biblical passages as well as excerpts from John Bunyan's The Pilgrim's Progress, a poem by the Hindu poet Kabir and a few passages she wrote herself. There are 20 movements arranged in two parts of 10 movements each, though some movements are quite brief.

The score is notable as containing a rare instance of a key signature of more than seven sharps or flats: the final section of the work is written in G-sharp major, a key with eight sharps (one double-sharp and six single-sharps).

It was premiered under the auspices of the Royal British Legion on Armistice Night, 11 November 1923 in the Royal Albert Hall by up to 1,250 instrumentalists and singers; the latter were called the Cenotaph Choir. The soloists were Herbert Heyner, Ida Cooper, Olga Haley and William Heseltine. The programme-book for that occasion proclaimed on its cover that the work was 'A Cenotaph in Sound' and it is likely that Foulds wished to present his work as a musical equivalent of the Cenotaph recently erected in Whitehall and designed by his friend Sir Edwin Lutyens. The performance brought Foulds such popular acclaim that after his death Maud MacCarthy was able to publish a book devoted to the positive responses to the work, though critical reaction was mixed. The work was repeated from 1924 to 1926 and constituted the first Festivals of Remembrance.

The vocal score was published by W. Paxton & Co. Ltd., London, whose business was eventually absorbed by the music publishers Novello & Co. During the period when the work was being performed in the 1920s, Foulds introduced various revisions and modifications.

Having lain neglected for eighty years, the BBC in association with the Royal British Legion undertook a revival of the work, performed at the Royal Albert Hall on 11 November 2007. The BBC Symphony Orchestra was joined by soloists Jeanne-Michèle Charbonnet, Catherine Wyn-Rogers, Gerald Finley and Stuart Skelton and the BBC Symphony Chorus was joined by the Crouch End Festival Chorus, Philharmonia Chorus and Trinity Boys Choir and conducted by Leon Botstein.

The concert was broadcast live on BBC Radio 3 (and was streamed online from their site) and was also recorded for later release by Chandos Records. The Chandos recording was issued in January 2008.

The German premiere was held on 2 November 2014 in Wetzlar Cathedral.
