= New London Children's Choir =

New London Children's Choir with Artistic Director Ronald Corp

The New London Children's Choir was a children's choir which rehearsed at Highgate Primary School in North London and, latterly, All Hallows, Gospel Oak, giving singing opportunities to members aged seven to eighteen. Members were from London and surrounding areas. It was founded in 1991 by Artistic Director Ronald Corp, creating rehearsals in July 2022 due to the COVID-19 pandemic before briefly returning to performances in December 2023. The choir was officially dissolved in February 2024 according to Companies House. As well as performing its own concerts, the choir sang with orchestras and ensembles in many concert halls and opera houses worldwide and features on several film and TV soundtracks and CDs.

== History and organization ==
The choir was launched by its musical director Ronald Corp in 1991 with the aim of introducing children to the challenges and fun of singing and performing all types of music. It held its own concerts at the end of the Christmas and Summer terms, and also ran a residential Summer School during the holidays at a school in Berkshire. The choir appeared in major London concert halls working with symphony orchestras as well as in major festivals and concerts across the UK and abroad. It performed frequently at the Proms, made a number of film soundtrack and TV recordings, including the soundtrack to Star Wars: Episode I – The Phantom Menace and been engaged for concerts and recordings with all the major London orchestras and opera companies such as the London Philharmonic Orchestra, and sing onstage at the English National Opera.

The choir was organised into three groups: Training Choir (for children aged 7–10), Senior Choir (for children aged 11–18; this element is the main performing auditioned choir) and Youth Choir (ages 14+ mixed SATB voices).

== Performances ==
Recent highlights of the choir include:

- Royal Opening of St Pancras International with Katherine Jenkins in the presence of Queen Elizabeth II
- Winner of Best Opera Recording at the Grammys 2008 for Engelbert Humperdinck's Hansel and Gretel- CHANDOS Label, Charles Mackerras/ Philharmonia
- Lou Reed Berlin Tour Europe 2007 and Summer 2008
- Falklands War 25th Memorial Concert at Southwark Cathedral
- Damon Albarn Plague Songs concert at the Barbican Centre November 2007
- John Adams' On the Transmigration of Souls - Barbican Centre 2007 with London Symphony Orchestra and Choir
- Blue Peter Prom 2007 Royal Albert Hall with Connie Fisher
- Aldeburgh Festival 2007
- Soundtrack for BBC documentary on footballer Walter Tull
- World premiere of Martynov's La Vita Nuova with the London Philharmonic Orchestra
- Barbican Centre's Twisted Christmas 2008
- Sass & Bide Shine Collective charity event
- Carmina Burana with the Various Voices Festival Chorus 2009

Other highlights include:

Benjamin Britten's War Requiem at The Royal Albert Hall, The Queen's 80th Birthday Prom, Mahler's Eighth Symphony at The Royal Albert Hall/Birmingham Symphony Hall with the Royal Philharmonic Orchestra, Richard Blackford's Voices of Exile at the Barbican, Humperdinck's Hansel and Gretel at the Barbican, Tan Dun A World Symphony for the Millennium (Albert Hall), yearly appearances at the BBC Proms, The Magic Pot- Lorin Maazel 70th Birthday Celebration at the Barbican.

The choir has performed in Italy (RAI Television), France, Belgium, Spain, Switzerland, Germany, Holland and made its US debut in 2003 at the Lincoln Center, New York.

== Recordings ==
The choir has appeared on a number of CDs in collaboration with other artists, as well as releasing discs of their own. Some of these include:

Composer/Artist	Title	Label	Distribution no.
Benjamin Britten	A Ceremony of carols; Friday Afternoons & Three Two part Songs	Naxos	8.553183
Betty Roe	Family Tree	Somm	CD209
New London Children's Choir	Pigs Could Fly	Naxos	
Kindred Spirits	Kindred Spirits	EMI Classics (2007)	509950974726
Charlotte Church	Dream a Dream	Sony CB	811CDKCF
Russell Watson	Outside In	2007	

The choir recorded for various feature films and collaborated with artists including: Tarzan, A Little Princess, The Seed of Chucky, Roberto Alagna, Charlotte Church, Russell Watson, Fat Les, Star Wars: Episode I – The Phantom Menace, Katherine Jenkins, Lemar, Ozzy Osbourne and Sharon Osbourne, and Lou Reed

The choir had a special commitment to commissioning and premiered over forty new works by composers such as Diana Burrell, Simon Bainbridge, Howard Skempton, Philip Cashian, Patrick Nunn, Richard Causton, Tansy Davies, John Woolrich, Michael Nyman, Gary Carpenter and Morgan Hayes. It has performed the premieres of dozens of further works.

== Patronage ==
The choir's patrons included Louis Andriessen, the late Oliver Knussen CBE, and Michael Nyman.
