= Grand Theatre, Southampton =

Former theatre in Southampton, England

Coordinates: 50.9067°N 1.4054°W

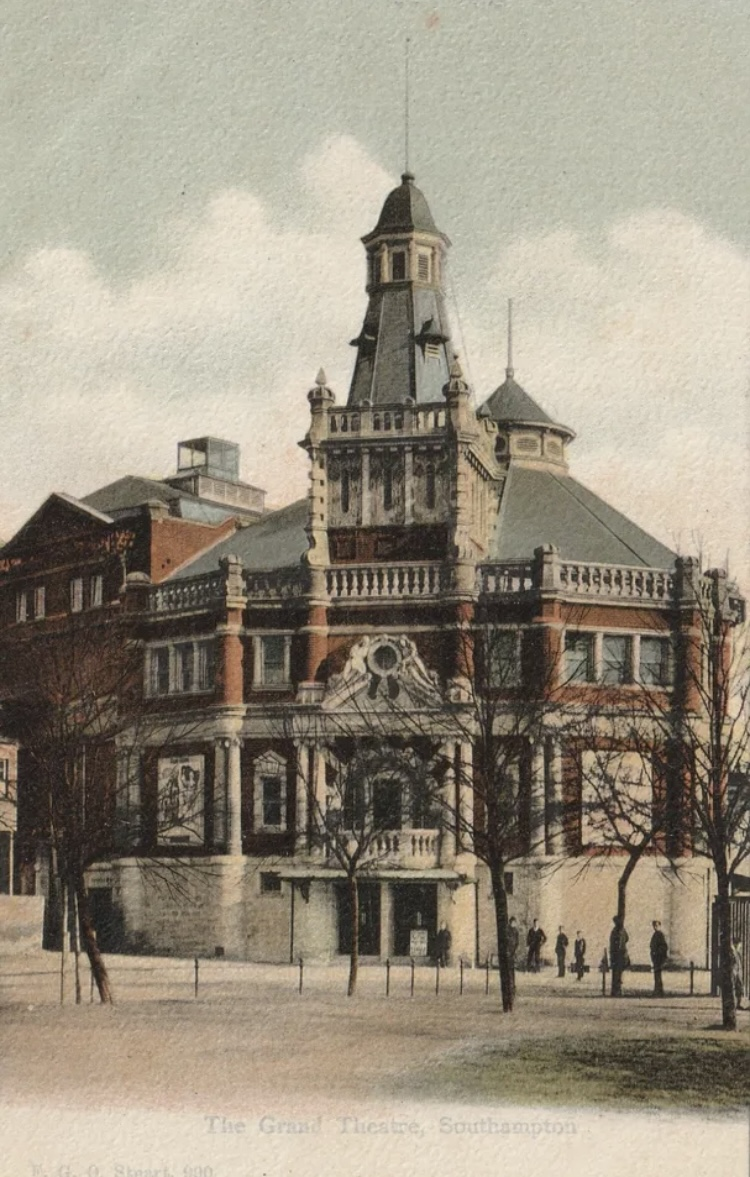
The Grand Theatre, Southampton in 1905

The Grand Theatre was a playhouse in Southampton in Hampshire, England from 1898 until it was demolished in 1960.

The Grand Theatre stood on the corner of Windsor Terrace and Civic Centre Road. It was constructed in 1898 but included some 18th-century buildings on its east side. It was designed by the architects William Hope and J. C. Maxwell of Newcastle upon Tyne and was built by Messrs Jenkins & Sons of Southampton in red brick with terracotta dressings in a French Renaissance style. The front entrance was enhanced with a balustrade above and a central tower, at the top of which was a high domed lantern fitted with a purple light.

The theatre was owned by Frederick Mouillot and H. H. 'Mackenzie' Morell, who put on productions with their own company with which they toured the provinces. Among the many theatres the two owned was the Swansea Grand Theatre in Swansea. The theatre's dressing rooms had originally been The Weighbridge, the former home of the Aslatt family in the 19th century, which was acquired by the theatre after the death of Henry Poate Aslatt in 1905.

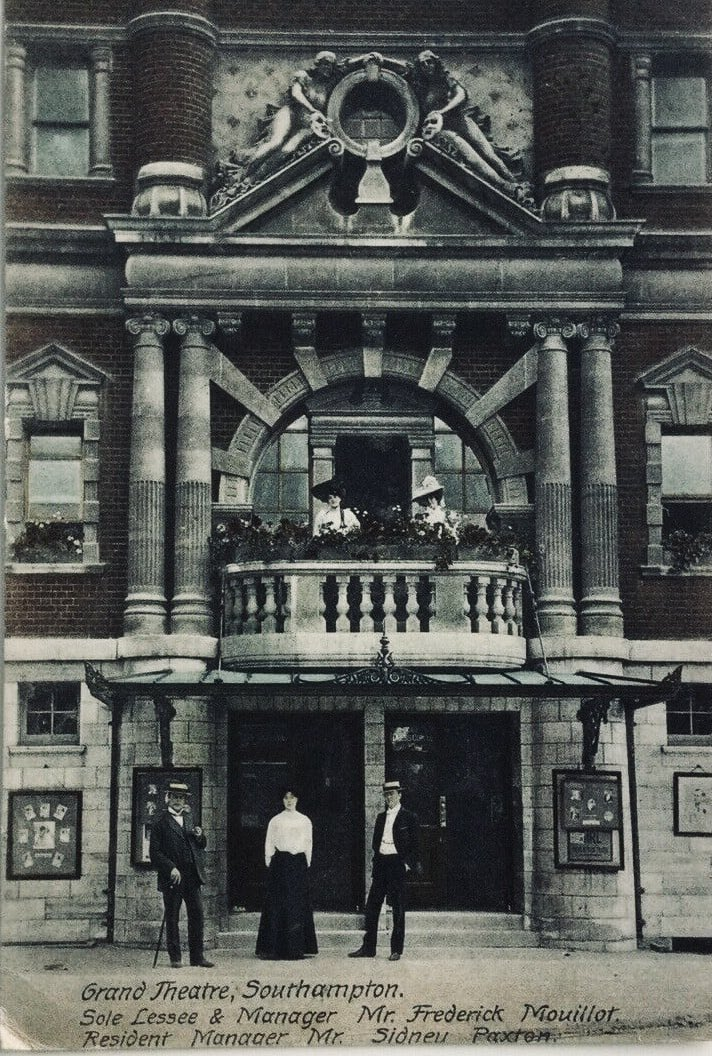
The staff of the Grand Theatre, Southampton in 1907

It opened on 5 December 1898 with a performance of The Little Minister by Frederick Harrison; it was performed by the theatrical company of Cyril Maude. The foundation stone was dedicated by the actress Mrs Kendal on 15 November 1898.

The theatre's horseshoe-shaped auditorium was 60 feet (18 metres) wide and two-tiered, with the Circle on the first tier and the Gallery on the second above that. The stage was 53 feet (16 m) in height from the floor to the grid and 37 feet (11 m) in depth. Below the stage was a large scene dock, a properties room, large cellars and a mezzanine floor. The theatre could seat 1,800 patrons and had electrical lighting throughout, with gas as an additional system.

The Grand Theatre was a "legitimate" theatre as it was a venue for plays, dramas and pantomimes performed by touring theatrical companies as opposed to music hall or variety acts. Among the performers to appear at the theatre were Sarah Bernhardt and Henry Irving. In 1904 Ellen Terry and her daughter Edith Craig appeared at the theatre in Much Ado About Nothing. The actor and theatre impresario Alfred Denville produced repertory plays at the Grand Theatre during the 1930s, and among the many actors who appeared in his productions at that time was Peter Cushing, who stayed with the company for about nine months. Early in its history the theatre was equipped to show bioscope films, with films of local events of interest being screened on 31 May 1902. On 2 July 1913 five short Kinemacolor films were shown.

Poster advertising an appearance by comedy duo Morecambe and Wise (1957)

The Grand Theatre became "The New Hippodrome" from 25 March 1939 until 14 September 1940, when it closed. It was used to provide accommodation for soldiers during World War II. With the end of war the theatre was renovated and, under its old name of the Grand Theatre, hosted dramas with its resident repertory company. As audiences dwindled in the 1950s as television became more popular, the theatre featured more striptease shows. The theatre finally closed in 1959 and was demolished in 1960. Marland House, a large commercial office block in the Brutalist style was constructed on the site in 1963 providing offices for local social services. On the demolition of this in about 2016 a new Marland House was built providing student accommodation for the nearby University of Southampton.
