= Ronald Corp =

British composer, conductor and Anglican priest (1951–2025)

The Reverend Ronald Corp OBE SSC
- Church: Church of England
- Diocese: Diocese of London

Orders
- Ordination: 1998 (deacon); 1999 (priest)

Personal details
- Born: Ronald Geoffrey Corp; 4 January 1951 Wells, Somerset, England
- Died: 7 May 2025 (aged 74) Bath, Somerset, England
- Denomination: Anglican
- Profession: Composer; Conductor; Clergyman
- Education: University of Oxford

Ronald Geoffrey Corp, OBE, SSC (4 January 1951 – 7 May 2025) was a British composer, conductor and Anglican priest. He was founder and artistic director of the New London Orchestra (NLO) and the New London Children's Choir. Corp was musical director of the London Chorus, a position he took up in 1994, and was also musical director of the Highgate Choral Society.

Corp was born and grew up in Wells, Somerset, later studying music at Oxford University. He was appointed Officer of the Order of the British Empire (OBE) in the 2012 New Year Honours for services to music. Corp died in Bath on 7 May 2025, at the age of 74.

== Ordained ministry ==
Corp attended the Southern Theological Education and Training Scheme to prepare for the priesthood. He was ordained in the Church of England as a deacon in 1998 and a priest in 1999. From 1998 to 2002, he served as a non-stipendiary minister (NSM) of St Mary's Church, Kilburn, London. From 2002 to 2007, he served as a NSM at St Mary's Church, Hendon. From 2007, he served as a NSM at the Church of St Alban the Martyr, Holborn. All three parishes in which he served are in the Anglo-Catholic tradition. He belonged to the Society of the Holy Cross (SSC).

== Conductor ==
=== New London Orchestra ===
See also New London Orchestra

When Ronald Corp founded the New London Orchestra in 1988, his conducting career was launched: engagements have included concerts and recordings with many orchestras including the Royal Liverpool Philharmonic Orchestra, Bournemouth Symphony Orchestra, BBC Concert Orchestra, Ulster Orchestra and Royal Scottish National Orchestra, as well as appearing at the BBC Proms.

Through his role as conductor and artistic director, Corp programmed and aimed to bring to life repertoire written in the late nineteenth and twentieth centuries that was rarely heard in concert. His introductions from the stage were a key part of his mission to make music more accessible. Together with the New London Orchestra, his championing of neglected music resulted in some 20 recordings with Hyperion Records which feature composers such as Milhaud, Satie, Elinor Remick Warren, Virgil Thomson, John Foulds and the Polish composer Grażyna Bacewicz; and a series of Light Music Classics, four of them of British, and one each of American Light Music Classics and European Light Music Classics.

The issue in late 2010 by Corp and the NLO of the first digital recording of Rutland Boughton's opera The Queen of Cornwall was designated 'Disc of The Month' in Opera magazine, March 2011 and 'Editor's Choice' in Gramophone, September 2011.

=== New London Children's Choir ===
The New London Children's Choir was launched by Ronald Corp in 1991 with the aim of introducing children to the challenges and fun of singing and performing all types of music. The Choir was one of the busiest and most successful children's ensembles in the country. It commissioned dozens of new pieces and premiered numerous other works by composers including its patrons Louis Andriessen and Michael Nyman as well as many by Corp himself. The choir performed frequently at the Proms, made a number of film soundtrack and TV recordings, including the soundtrack to Star Wars Episode 1, 'The Phantom Menace' and 'Cinderella', and was engaged for concerts and recordings with major London orchestras and opera companies. Choir members appeared on stage at the Coliseum and the Royal Opera House, and toured with artists including Lou Reed and Nick Cave.

== Composer ==
Corp began writing music at a very early age. Learning the piano gave him a means of hearing and notating the pieces. He wrote throughout his life and left a substantial body of work.

The list of his compositions is extensive and dominated by works for voice, whether solo, for small vocal groupings, church choirs or massive choral societies – Highgate Choral Society and the London Chorus have been regular performers over the years. His first major choral work And All the Trumpets Sounded was premiered in 1989 by Highgate Choral Society, the composer stating, "My piece focuses on war, the dead and the trumpets of the last judgement". Five years later, and combining text from the Te Deum with Wordsworth and Hopkins, the cantata Laudamus was premiered to great critical acclaim at St John's, Smith Square by the London Choral Society (now the London Chorus). In 2003 BBC Radio 3 commissioned a major work for the BBC Singers – an a cappella setting of Matthew Arnold's Dover Beach.

Following his work with youth choruses and the formation of the New London Children's Choir, Corp also established himself as a composer for young voices. On the strength of this reputation, he was commissioned to write for the Farnham Youth Choir who were winners of their section in the 'Sainsbury Choir of the Year' (1998), resulting in Four Elizabethan Lyrics to texts by Shakespeare, Dekker, Jonson and Chidiock Tichborne. Other substantial works for children's choir include Cornucopia, a cycle of songs with orchestra (1997), and its successor Kaleidoscope (2002) which includes a setting of 'The Owl and the Pussycat'. His Christmas opera Wenceslas was premiered by the New London Children's Choir in 1982 and revived in 2008, while a more recent children's opera, The Ice Mountain, had three performances in 2010–11 by the same choir, and has been recorded.

His interest in literature is evident in the many song-sets devoted to settings of a single poet, e.g. The Music of Francis Thompson which received its première at Benslow Music Trust in January 2010. An earlier set, The Music of Whitman, had its première at the 2011 Tardebigge English Song Festival in Worcestershire, performed by Mark Stone (baritone) and Stephen Barlow (piano); while The Music of Browning was first performed in October of the same year as part of the Little Venice Music Festival with Robert Presley (baritone) and Andrew Robinson (piano). In March 2013, the baritone Lee Tsang premiered The Music of Larkin at Middleton Hall in Hull, Yorkshire. There are also discrete songs such as the humorous The Bath, and song-cycles such as Flower of Cities which takes London as its unifying theme.

Among his orchestral works are Symphony No. 1 (2009) which evokes "a journey from darkness to light" and the programmatic triptych Guernsey Postcards (2004) with its depictions of a local fair, Pembroke Bay and St. Peter Port, commissioned by the Guernsey Camerata.

Another large-scale work is the Piano Concerto No.1 (1997) which has received three performances by pianists Julian Evans and Leon McCawley and was described by one critic as,

... possibly the most winningly successful British Piano Concerto of the last forty years or so. It is, wholly exceptionally, very well written in true virtuoso pianistic style.

The String Quartet No.1 'The Bustard' was premiered at the Wigmore Hall by the Maggini Quartet in 2008.

On Saturday 9 July 2011, Corp celebrated his 60th birthday year at the Royal Festival Hall in London with a performance of And All the Trumpets Sounded and the world première of The Wayfarer (In Homage to Mahler) for 16 solo singers and orchestra – a setting of two of Mahler's own poems from his Lieder eines fahrenden Gesellen and of his early poem 'Im Lenz'. Ronald Corp conducted the NLO, and the combined forces of Highgate Choral Society, The London Chorus and the New London Children's Choir were deployed in the rest of the concert. A pre-concert talk took place with Corp in conversation with Richard Morrison.

On 23 November 2011 a new anthem Laudate Dominum was performed at the Festival of St. Cecilia Service at Westminster Cathedral. This had been specially commissioned by the Musicians Benevolent Fund and was sung by the combined choirs of Westminster Cathedral, Westminster Abbey and St. Paul's Cathedral under Martin Baker.

The Queen's Diamond Jubilee was celebrated by a special concert given at the Barbican by Highgate Choral Society and the NLO on Saturday 9 June 2012, to include the première of This Sceptr'd Isle by Corp, a stirring seven-minute setting of text from Shakespeare's Richard II, the orchestra replete with surging sea-imagery and fanfares for four trumpets.

Corp's orchestrations of Erik Satie's Gnossiennes are featured in the film Chocolat of 2000.

More detailed information on Corp's life as a composer can be found on the Ronald Corp website.

=== Later works ===
An interest in Buddhist literature is reflected in his setting of parts of the Dhammapada (2010) for eight solo singers (or SATB choir) interspersed with recordings of bells at temples sacred to the Buddha; and the cycle Songs of the Elder Sisters (from the Therigatha) for mezzo-soprano, baritone, alto flute, clarinet and viola. The latter was recorded in February 2012 with Sarah Castle (mezzo-soprano) and Sam Evans (baritone) while Dhammapada had been recorded and released by Stone Records in 2011.

Andrew Stewart writes: "How does the composer respond to those who question why a Christian minister was drawn to set a fundamental Buddhist text? Dhammapada, he says, was created to open dialogue among faiths: 'It’s about inviting people to open their ears and minds to spirituality. These words, thought to be by the Buddha himself, tell us essential truths, which stand against cynical and untrusting ways of seeing the world and our place in it.' Dhammapada contemplates the corrupting force of material things and the transience of wealth, beauty and power."

The music critic Michael Church reviewed the recording thus: "...Set for small choir, it becomes a beguiling work, full of scrunchy dissonances but graceful to the ear", designating it 'Album of the Week' in The Independent, 29 January 2011.

Also recorded in May 2012 were the String Quartet No. 3, the Clarinet Quintet 'Crawhall' and The Yellow Wallpaper for mezzo-soprano and string quintet, all composed in 2011. In these, the Maggini String Quartet are joined by Andrew Marriner (clarinet), Rebecca de Pont Davies (mezzo-soprano) and John Tattersdill (double bass). Regarding the subtitle of 'Crawhall' for the Quintet, Ronald Corp stated:

Joseph Crawhall (1821–1896) was an engraver, writer, businessman, patron of arts, book designer, collector of antiquities, campaigner for the perseveration of architecture and a significant character in the life of Newcastle. His colourful life and wonderful woodblock illustrations have inspired this clarinet quintet which I hope gives some flavour of this most remarkable and likeable man.

The Yellow Wallpaper is a dramatic scena with text by Francis Booth adapted from the short story of Charlotte Perkins Gilman. This work continues the current trend for chamber compositions and unconventional instrumental/vocal groupings: Lullaby for a Lost Soul features a setting for counter-tenor, vibraphone, flute and cello with re-imaginings of the melancholy music of John Dowland. The text follows themes of loss, death and helplessness. It was recorded in September 2012.

In January 2013, three of these works, The Yellow Wallpaper, Songs of the Elder Sisters and Lullaby for a Lost Soul were performed at the event 'Corp de Ballet' in collaboration with The Chantry Dance Company for a CD launch at the Village Underground, Shoreditch, London.

== Recordings of Corp's music ==
Besides the recordings shown in the discography below, other recordings of compositions by Corp include:

- And All the Trumpets Sounded performed by The London Chorus, Mark Stone (baritone) and Bournemouth Symphony Orchestra under Corp on Dutton Epoch (2011).
- A Christmas Mass sung by Chantage on the disc Hark! Chantage at Christmas on EMI (2008).
- Five Flower Songs, Spring (When Daisies pied), Give to my Eyes, Lord and 'At Day-close in November' plus children's choir works by other composers on Pigs Could Fly, performed by the New London Children's Choir on Naxos (2008).
- Susanni sung by Worcester Cathedral Choir under Donald Hunt on the disc Joy to the World – A selection from The Novello Book of Carols on Hyperion/Helios (2003).
- A Cradle Song with the Armagh Girl Singers under Aubrey McClintock on Lammas Records (1999).

=== Discography ===
Disc Title	Contents	Performers	Label and Catalogue Number	Recording and Release Dates
Hail! Bright Cecelia 1947 – 2001	A Selection Of Anthems Commissioned By The Musician's Benevolent Fund God Is Gone Up (Gerald Finzi); Come Down, O Love Divine (John Rutter); Lord, Thou Hast Been Our Refuge (John Joubert); Christus Vincit (James MacMillan); God Is Our Hope And Strength (Simon Preston); Thou Mastering Me God (Jonathan Harvey); King Of Glory (Herbert Howells); Annunciation (John Tavener); Sing, Mortals! (Arthur Bliss); Live For Ever, Glorious Lord (George Dyson); The Voice Out Of The Whirlwind (Ralph Vaughan Williams) 'betwixt Heaven And Charing Cross (Anthony Payne)	BBC Singers cond. by Ronald Corp; Stephen Disley (organ)	MUSICIANS BENEVOLENT FUND RECORDS MBF 1	2004/ August 2004
Forever Child and Other Choral Music	Forever Child Verbum Patris; Give to my Eyes, Lord (Colin Coppen) 'May the Lord Bless You and Keep You' (from Adonai Echad); Dover Beach (Arnold) 'Weep You no more, Sad Fountains' (from Cornucopia); Two Partsongs ('Heraclitus' and 'I Strove with None'); Missa San Marco; Four Elizabethan Lyrics; Fear No More the Heat o' the Sun (Shakespeare); Lute-Book Lullaby (Sweet was the Song); Requiem (R. L. Stevenson)	Voces Cantabiles cond. by Ronald Corp	DUTTON EPOCH CDLX 7171	2005/ May 2006
[Orchestral Works]	Guernsey Postcards Piano Concerto No. 1 Symphony No. 1	Royal Liverpool Philharmonic Orchestra cond. by Ronald Corp; Leon McCawley (piano)	DUTTON EPOCH CDLX 7233	June 2009/ Nov. 2009
The Songs of Ronald Corp	The Music of Housman The Music of Whitman; Flower of Cities; Give to my Eyes, Lord (Colin Coppen); Break, break, break (Tennyson); The Owl and the Pussycat (Lear); Sleep (John Fletcher); Toward the Unknown Region (Whitman); The Bath (Harry Graham) and song arrangements from Cornucopia	Mark Stone (baritone) Simon Lepper (piano)	STONE RECORDS 5060192780031	2010/ Oct. 2010
String Quartets	String Quartet No. 1 'The Bustard' String Quartet No. 2 Country Matters (song-cycle for tenor and string trio to poems by Steve Mainwaring)	Maggini String Quartet Marke Wilde (tenor)	NAXOS 8.570578	2010/ March 2011
Dhammapada	Dhammapada	Apsara Chamber Choir cond. by Ronald Corp	STONE RECORDS 5060192780055	2010/ Jan. 2011
The Ice Mountain	The Ice Mountain (an opera for children's voices and small ensemble or piano, libretto by Emma Hill based on an old Swiss legend 'Die alte Frau and did Toten')	The New London Children's Choir Members of New London Orchestra cond. by Ronald Corp	NAXOS 8.572777	2010/ May 2011
Things I didn't say	Things I didn't say (Steve Mainwaring) The Revival (Henry Vaughan); Never weather-beaten Sail (Thomas Campion); Three Medieval Carols; Ave Maria; Ave verum The Pilgrim (John Bunyan); Psalm 150; The Bells of Paradise; We Will Remember Them (Laurence Binyon)	Apsara Chamber Choir Edward Batting (organ) cond. by Ronald Corp	STONE RECORDS 5060192780185	2010-2011/ 2012
String, Paper, Wood	String Quartet No. 3 The Yellow Wallpaper (for mezzo-soprano and string quintet); Clarinet Quintet 'Crawhall'	Rebecca de Pont Davies (mezzo-soprano); Andrew Marriner (clarinet); John Tattersdill (double bass); Maggini String Quartet	STONE RECORDS 5060192780246	May 2012/ Jan. 2013
Songs of the Elder Sisters	Songs of the Elder Sisters (cycle of songs and interludes for mezzo-soprano, baritone, alto flute, clarinet and viola, to texts translated from the Pali by Francis Booth)	Sarah Castle (mezzo-soprano) Samuel Evans (baritone); Jill Carter (alto flute); Sarah Thurlow (clarinet); Rachel Bolt (viola)	STONE RECORDS 5060192780369	March 2012/ 2013
Lullaby for a Lost Soul	Lullaby for a Lost Soul (cycle for counter-tenor, flute, vibraphone and cello to poems by Francis Booth, with "re-imaginings" of the music of John Dowland as Interludes)	Magid El-Bushra (counter-tenor) Jill Carter (flute); Matthew Turner (vibraphone); Julia Desbrulais (cello)	STONE RECORDS 5060192780413	Sept. 2012/ 2014

== List of compositions ==
The music of Ronald Corp is published by Boosey and Hawkes (BH), Chester Music (C), Colla Voce (CV), Faber Music (F), Novello (N), Oxford University Press (OUP), Royal Society of Church Music (RSCM), Stainer and Bell (SB), Trinity Guildhall (TG) and the Ronald Corp website (RC). Where no publisher is given, please refer to the Ronald Corp website.

Programme notes, music excerpts and links to publishers and score purchasing facilities can be found on the Ronald Corp website.

Orchestral

- Guernsey Postcards (1. The Viaer Marchi 2. Pembroke Bay 3. St. Peter Port) (2004)
- Gymnopédie No. 2 (Satie arr. Corp)
- Overture to the Games (2010)
- Piano Concerto No. 1 (1997)
- Le Piccadilly (Satie arr. Corp) (2011)
- A Purcell Suite (2003 rev. 2008)
- Symphony No. 1 (2009)
- Trois Gnossiennes (Satie arr. Corp)

Choir with orchestra

- Adonai Echad ('The Lord is One') (2000)
- And All the Trumpets Sounded (1988) (SB)
- Jubilate Deo (2008)
- Laudamus (1994)
- Mary's Song (2001)
- Mass 'Christ our Future' (1999) (OUP)
- A New Song (1999) (OUP)
- The Hound of Heaven (2009) (RC)
- This Sceptr'd Isle (2012) (RC)
- The Wayfarer (in Homage to Mahler) (2011) (RC)

Instrumental and chamber

- Clarinet Quintet 'Crawhall' (2011)
- Fanfare for Trinity (brass and timps)
- Homage to Martinů (flute and piano)
- Noël (organ solo)
- Pas de trios (flute, oboe and piano) (1982)
- Piano Sonata
- Piece for clarinet and piano (1981)
- Piece for oboe and piano (1980)
- Piece for violin and piano (1981)
- Priiditje and From the liturgy… (string trio)
- Rhapsody for Bassoon and Piano – Notes from 'The Egoist' (1980)
- Rhapsody for Double Bass and Piano
- Sarah's Gavotte (recorder and piano)
- String Quartet No. 1 "The Bustard" (2008)
- String Quartet No. 2 (2010)
- String Quartet No. 3 (2011)

SATB with organ or piano

- All my Heart this Night rejoices (RC)
- Alleluia! He is risen! (in Songs for Life, Volume 2) (RSCM)
- Ave verum (2001)
- The Bells of Paradise (RC)
- A Christmas Mass (2007) (SB)
- Carol of the Nativity (RC)
- Come, Landlord, fill the flowing Bowl
- Elegy for himself (from 'Four Elizabethan Lyrics') (SATB, pf) (OUP)
- Elegy for himself (from 'Four Elizabethan Lyrics') (SATB, organ and strings) (OUP)
- Give to my Eyes, Lord (OUP)
- Go tell it on the Mountain (RC)
- God be in my Head (see 'Forever Child') (OUP)
- Incline Your Ear, O Lord
- Mass 'Christ our Future' (unison/two parts/SATB) (OUP)
- May the Lord bless you and keep you (from Adonai Echad) (CV)
- O magnum mysterium (1987)
- People, Look East! (Advent carol) (RC)
- The Pilgrim (anthem) (RC)
- Praise the Lord, O my soul!
- Psalm 150 (O Praise God in His Holiness) (SATB, org) (RC)
- Psalm 150 (O Praise God in His Holiness) (SATB, org, brass)
- The Revival (The Lilies of His Love) (anthem) (RC)
- Shepherds, O Hark Ye
- Spirit of Mercy, Truth and Love (RSCM)
- The Spirit of the Lord is upon me (in The Voice for Life Songbook 1: The Blue Book. RSCM)
- Take up Your Cross (in Sunday by Sunday Collection, Volume 1. RSCM)
- There is no Rose (with organ/piano) (1979) (N)
- We Three Kings
- We Will Remember Them (RC)
- We Wish You a Merry Christmas (RC)
- The Wexford Carol (RC)
- What Tidings (1981)
- You visit the Earth (in Songs for Life, Volume 2) (RSCM)

SATB unaccompanied

- Ave Maria (2009) (RC)
- Ave verum (2009) (RC)
- Dhammapada (RC)
- Dover Beach
- Fear No More the Heat o'the Sun (with optional organ interludes) (RC)
- Forever Child (OUP)
- Gabriel's Message ('The Angel Gabriel')
- Gaudete
- Grace – Praise God from Whom all Blessings Flow
- Hodie (1986)
- The Huron Carol (RC)
- I Sing of a Maiden (1975) (RC)
- I'll miss you (RC)
- In dulci jubilo (1976)
- Infant Holy (1976)
- Jingle Bells (barbershop)
- Laudate Dominum (2011) (RC)
- Litany
- Lute-book Lullaby ('Sweet was the Song') (N)
- Mary was watching tenderly
- Missa Brevis
- Missa San Marco (with optional organ) (2002) (SB)
- Never weather-beaten Sail (RC)
- Nunc Dimittis
- O My Dear Heart (RC)
- Our Blessed Lady's Lullaby (RC)
- Red River Valley (barbershop)
- Requiem (R. L. Stevenson) (see 'Forever Child') (OUP)
- A Rose Bud by my early Walk
- Silent Night (RC)
- Susanni (N)
- Things I didn't say
- Three Medieval Carols (1. Myn Lyking 2. The Virgin's Cradle Hymn 3. Quem Pastores Laudavere) (SB)
- Three Shakespeare Songs (1983) (RC)
- Two Partsongs (1. Heraclitus 2. I strove with none) (RC)
- Verbum Patri (Verbum Patris umanatur) (OUP)

Selected works for children's voices with instrumental ensemble (or orchestra) or piano

- All ye Works of the Lord
- Cornucopia (Seasonal Songs: 1. Whether the weather 2. Cows 3. The Irish Pig 4. Winter Morning. Sadder Songs: 5. The Paint Box 6. Weep You no more, Sad Fountains 7. Lone Dog 8. Sensitive, Seldom and Sad. Sillier Songs: 9. The Ship of Rio 10. The modern Hiawatha 'When he killed the Mudjokivis' 11. I've had this Shirt 12. Granny) (1997) (OUP)
- For A Child/For Billy
- The Ice Mountain (An Opera for Children)
- Kaleidoscope (1. Weatherlore 2. The Shark 3. Grim and Gloomy 4. Plenty more Fish in the Sea 5. The Pobble who has no Toes 6. To Daffodils 7. There was a wee bit Mousikie 8. Proud Songsters 9. When Icicles Hang by the Wall (Winter) 10. Reeds of Innocence 11. Windy Nights 12. The Owl and the Pussycat 13. The Duchess's Lullaby 14. Weatherlore) (2002)
- Playing with the Sun (2002)
- Wenceslas (A Christmas Opera for Children)

Selected works for treble or women's voices with or without piano

- Ambapali's Song (RC)
- At Day-close in November (from Hardy Songs) (in BH anthology Kaleidoscope)
- Away in a Manger (Normandy tune arr. Corp) (N)
- A Cradle Song (aka Blake's Cradle Song) (N)
- Five Flower Songs (aka Flower Songs) (RC)
- Four Elizabethan Lyrics (OUP)
- Goin' Green (RC)
- I Know Where I'm Going (in BH anthology Kaleidoscope)
- May the Lord Bless You and Keep You (from Adonai Echad) (CV)
- Spring (When Daisies pied) (with piano) (OUP)
- The Owl and the Pussycat (in BH anthology Kaleidoscope)
- The Three Kings (Cornelius arr. Corp for upper voices)(OUP)
- Three Shanties (N)
- Tomorrow Shall Be My Dancing Day
- When Icicles Hang by the Wall (in BH anthology Kaleidoscope)

Songs, song-cycles and song sets

- The Bargain (1972)
- The Bath (RC)
- Break, break, break (tenor and piano) (1966)
- Break, break, break (baritone and piano) (1966)
- Come away, Death (with flute and guitar)
- Country Matters (RC)
- Down in a Valley and other Songs (1983) (RC)
- Elizabethan Songs (for Naomi)
- Flower of Cities (RC)
- Give to my Eyes, Lord (in compilation Oxford Solo Songs: Sacred (high voice) – 16 songs with piano or organ) (OUP)
- Give to my Eyes, Lord (in compilation Oxford Solo Songs: Sacred (low voice) – 16 songs with piano or organ) (OUP)
- He Kicked the Chair (RC)
- Miscellanie
- The Irish Pig (see 'Cornucopia') (OUP)
- The Music of Blake
- The Music of Browning (2011) (RC)
- The Music of Burns
- The Music of Byron
- The Music of Catullus (1972)
- The Music of Clare
- The Music of Donne (1973)
- The Music of Drayton (with oboe, bassoon, violin and cello) (1971)
- The Music of Drayton (with string quartet) (1971)
- The Music of Emily Dickinson (with guitar) (1974)
- The Music of Fletcher (1980)
- The Music of Housman (RC)
- The Music of Keats
- The Music of Landor
- The Music of Larkin (2012)
- The Music of Tennyson
- The Music of Francis Thompson (2010)
- The Music of Whitman (1973) (RC)
- The Music of Wilde (1976)
- O admirabile (1972)
- O Harry, thou hast robbed me of my youth
- The Owl and the Pussycat
- Perdita to Florizel (with flute) (1981)
- Portrait of the Artist as a Young Poet (D. H. Lawrence) (1981)
- Sensitive, Seldom and Sad (see Cornucopia) (OUP)
- The Ship of Rio (see 'Cornucopia') (OUP)
- Sleep (RC)
- Spring (When Daisies pied) (with flute and guitar) (OUP)
- Three Elizabethan Songs (Sidney, Chapman, Shakespeare)
- Toward the Unknown Region (RC)
- Weep You no more, Sad Fountains (see Cornucopia) (OUP)
- Who Has Seen The Wind (in compilation Singer's World Book 1) (TG)

Voice with ensemble

- Lullaby for a Lost Soul (countertenor, flute, vibraphone, cello) (RC)
- Songs of the Elder Sisters (from the Therigatha) (mezzo-sop., baritone, alto flute, clarinet, viola) (RC)
- The Yellow Wallpaper (mezzo-sop., string quintet) (RC)
