= Maud MacCarthy (Omananda Puri) =

Irish violinist, theosophist and esoteric teacher

- Also known as: Maud Mann; Tandra Devi; Swami Omananda Puri
- Born: 4 July 1882 Clonmel, County Tipperary, Ireland
- Died: 2 June 1967 (aged 84) Douglas, Isle of Man
- Occupation(s): Violinist, singer, theosophist, writer, poet, teacher
- Instrument: Violin

Maud MacCarthy (4 July 1882 – 2 June 1967), was an Irish violinist, singer, theosophist, writer, poet, esoteric teacher and authority on Indian music. She was among the first to begin a campaign to abolish the use of the harmonium in Indian music. She noted that keyed instruments and their rigid notes had caused the decline in vocal skills in Western music.

== Early life ==
MacCarthy was born in Clonmel, County Tipperary, Ireland, the daughter of Dr. Charles William MacCarthy and his wife Marion. Her early years were spent in Sydney, Australia, where the family emigrated in 1885. However, by 1891 she had returned to Britain to study the violin at the Royal College of Music, London, as a pupil of Enrique Fernández Arbós. As a child, she performed in standard concertos at the Crystal Palace and Queen's Hall. She also toured with the Boston Symphony Orchestra, and visited South Africa and Australia.

In 1905, she was forced to give up her ambitions as a concert soloist by the onset of neuritis and went to India as a companion of Annie Besant, where she studied Indian music, collecting manuscripts and instruments, learned Indian singing and also studied Indian mysticism. She returned to England in 1909 following the death of her younger brother. In 1911, she married William Mann, a fellow theosophist, thus changing her name to Maud Mann. The couple had a daughter, Joan, in 1912. The marriage was short-lived, as Maud soon met and fell in love with the composer John Foulds in 1915. Despite strong opposition from family and friends, Maud and John Foulds left their respective spouses and lived together from 1918 onwards. They had two children, John Patrick (1916–2009) and Marybride (1922–1988). They finally married in 1932. She compiled the text for his World Requiem which was performed at the Albert Hall on four consecutive Armistice Nights between 1923 and 1926.

== Spiritual teaching ==
In 1929, while living in the East End of London, they met a young man at a local social event whom they commonly referred to as 'The Boy'. A quiet yet powerful figure who worked at the local gas works, his real name was William (Bill) Coote. 'The Boy' almost instantaneously began to channel a group of beings known as 'The Brothers' who gave profound spiritual teachings through him for the next 26 years. Maud returned to India with John Foulds and William Coote in 1935 where 'The Brothers' continued their teachings through 'The Boy', making a profound impact on thousands of people in search of spiritual meaning. John Foulds died suddenly in 1939, and Maud married 'The Boy' in 1942.

She founded an ashram and published poetry under the name Tandra Devi. She took the name Swami Omananda Puri after her husband's death when she took sannyas (or renunciation of worldly life). It was under this name that she published her autobiography of her experiences with 'The Boy' in The Boy and the Brothers (London: Gollancz, 1959). A second book was posthumously published as Towards the Mysteries (London: Neville Spearman, 1968) which further expanded on The Brothers' teachings and message. Her papers are now held at the Borthwick Institute for Archives at the University of York.

== Death ==
She died in Douglas on the Isle of Man, aged 84, and was buried at Glastonbury.
