= String Quartet No. 3 (Bacewicz) =

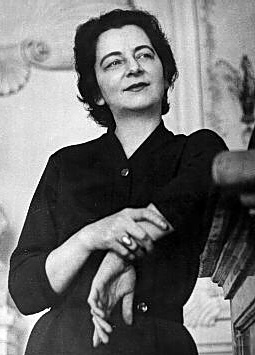
Grażyna Bacewicz before World War II

The String Quartet No. 3 is a composition for string quartet written in 1947 by Polish Composer Grażyna Bacewicz. The violinist-composer wrote this piece during her stay in Paris following the 1944 Warsaw Uprising, and it was later awarded the Polish Ministry of Culture Award in 1955 alongside her Symphony No.4 and Violin Concerto No.3. This quartet was the first to be initially published alongside quartets 4-7 before more recent reprintings of her prior quartets.

== Historical Context ==
Following the failed operation in Warsaw, Bacewicz and her family temporarily departed from Poland during the violent conflicts of World War II. Upon returning, Warsaw was then occupied by the Germans, causing their authorities to ban the performance of Polish music. This led Bacewicz and others to perform and have their works read during privately held underground concerts.

Bacewicz then wrote String Quartet No.3 in the years following her later arrival and subsequent musical establishment in Paris as a renowned soloist. In this contrastingly optimistic period of her life which afforded her a higher degree of creative liberty, Bacewicz noted several of the positive experiences she had as both a violinist and composer, remarking the pride in her composition of the quartet, and with respect to her composition of the quartet, that "Paris has some ineffable quality which is favourable to creative work."

== Analysis ==
Written during Bacewicz' notably neoclassical era of composition, this quartet preceded her later use of Polish folk tunes as seen in her String Quartet No.4. Featuring frequent polyphonic use of contrary motion, interweaving melodic lines, whole tone scales, and chromatic passages, the quartet is more based in triadic harmony than that of her later works which feature attempts at more avant garde compositional techniques such as serialism, though it is still not entirely tonal and contains many gestures and phrases without a traditional cadence.

All three movements have a key signature with no sharps or flats, however are not particularly in the associated keys of C major or A minor. This can be seen clearly in the opening of the first movement, which arrives at a section which could be considered in D major, however is notated entirely with accidentals. This work includes detailed markings of bowings, styles, articulations, intended strings on which to play, and expressive gestures such as downward glissandos. Bacewicz distinctly orchestrated large sections of the quartet to harmonically allow the frequent use of open strings and their respective natural harmonics throughout all three movements.

=== I. Allegro ma non troppo ===
The structure of this movement is symmetrical, with the A and B sections following the opening returning as B'-A' as the piece comes to a close. Beginning with dense double stopped pulsing sixteenth notes which repeatedly build up in contrary motion, the opening introduces the rhythmic and contrapuntal ideas seen throughout the movement, despite its melodic theme not returning. This brisk 2/4 movement features frequent use of syncopated groupings and off-beat entrances of eighth and sixteenth note figures which vary between being tutti and accompanimental to the melody. Though the harmonies and contours of the melodies used in different sections of this piece are quite varied, the rhythmic structure of both thematic material and accompaniment is consistent; moving eights are slurred across beats, and the pulsing sixteenth notes most often begin just after the beat.

=== II. Andante ===
Following typical conventions of quartet form, this movement is the slowest in the work in a slow 3/4. As a through composed piece, this movement contains little returning material aside from a series of staggered entrances on held notes, and an earlier section of eight notes slurred in syncopations which is arguably characteristic of the first movement. This movement is also features the most extensive use of harmonics and downward glissandos throughout the work.

=== III. Vivo ===
Written in altered rondo form, the combination of form and tempo marking seen in this movement is a common style of third movements in Bacewicz' pieces, such as in her Concerto for string orchestra. In a quick 2/4 with near ever-present lines of continuous sixteenth notes in most of the sections, the returning themes of this movement are subjected to extensive motivic transformation, but are nonetheless recognizable to the listener and consistent in style. The harmony of this movement is the most tonal of the three, beginning and ending in the same key of F major, remaining in established harmonic centers for longer sections, and utilizing more traditional cadences, tonicizations and modulations.

== Reception ==
Alongside receiving the Polish Ministry of Culture Award nearly a decade later, her friend and colleague Witold Lutosławski remarked in particular "and her String Quartet No. 3, which is marked by an exceptional polyphonic skill in addition to its masterly idiomatic writing for string quartet." Despite its relative overall success and Bacewicz' fame as both a performer and composer at the time, her Quartet No. 3 is not well known, and is not performed or recorded as often as others in the string quartet genre.
