= Piotr Baryka =

Piotr Baryka (1600 – 1675) was a seventeenth-century Polish soldier and writer. He is listed as one of the authors present at the coronation of Władysław IV.

== History ==
From 1625 to 1629 he took part in military expeditions for Hetman Stanislaw Koniecpolski. Then he settled at the court of Sieradz as a wealthy citizen (perhaps he was Albert Lubienski-Makovetski Sieradzki). Between 1629 and 1633, Baryka wrote a Carnival comedy about a peasant who was turned into king (Z chłopa król). It was first staged as it was in 1633, and finally printed in 1637. The play inspired the plot of Ludvig Holberg's 1722 play Jeppe on the Hill.

Piotr Baryka is one of the few of these playwrights whose names have come to us. The Peasant King, as its title indicates, carries a motif made popular in the introduction to Shakespeare's The Taming of the Shrew — the seeming bestowal of noble rank upon a person of lowly birth. Several examples of this type of comedy have survived, and they include realistic depictions of all the popular customs and grotesquely humorous situations that parody in many cases the lofty themes of the "official" literature.
