= New London Orchestra =

New London Orchestra (NLO)
- Orchestra
- New London Orchestra logo
- Founded: 1988
- Principal conductor: Ronald Corp
- Website: www.nlo.co.uk

The New London Orchestra (NLO) is an English London-based orchestra specialising in rarely heard late 19th and 20th century music.

The original New London Orchestra was formed in 1941 by conductor Alec Sherman and was used by Dame Myra Hess to play at her historic series of wartime National Gallery concerts. The New London Orchestra was revived in 1988 as a body of players regularly assembled by Ronald Corp to accompany concerts given by Highgate Choral Society. The orchestra is independent of public funding, being reliant on private sponsorship and donations.

== History ==
=== 1940s and 1950s ===
Alec Sherman (1907–2008) began his musical career as a violinist with the BBC Symphony Orchestra, then became the conductor of the British Women's Symphony Orchestra for two years before forming the New London Orchestra in 1941, inspired by the early success of Sidney Beer's National Symphony Orchestra (and using many of the same players). The first concert was held on August 14 1941, at Guildhall, Cambridge. Myra Hess engaged the orchestra for her performances of all the Mozart piano concertos between 1943 and 1945 at the National Gallery. Soloists playing with the orchestra in 1945 included Benno Moiseiwitsch and Clifford Curzon. The following year the orchestra embarked on a CEMA-backed series of concerts in historic buildings around the UK, beginning with Canterbury Cathedral. Also in 1946 the Greek pianist Gina Bachauer made her British orchestral début at the Albert Hall, London, playing Grieg’s Piano Concerto with the New London Orchestra. She married Alec Sherman in 1951.

The orchestra included many well-known players, including Léon Goossens (oboe), Gareth Morris (flute), Vernon Elliott and Cecil James (bassoons), Frederick Thurston (clarinet), Dennis Brain and Norman Del Mar (horns). The orchestra continued to give concerts until the mid 1950s and made several recordings. Sherman announced his retirement from conducting in 1958.

=== 1990s ===
Founded in 1988, the revived New London Orchestra (NLO) has specialised in rarely heard late 19th and 20th century repertoire. It is based in London. With Ronald Corp as Artistic Director the Orchestra has helped to bring the music of Martinů and other neglected composers to a wider audience, and also to re-establish the popularity of British Light Music through a series of recordings on the independent label Hyperion Records. As well as Martinů, whose music was programmed in every concert from the Orchestra's launch until his centenary in 1990, there have been performances of music by Ibert, Milhaud, Kabalevsky, Honegger, Roussel and Sibelius.

The NLO played at four BBC Proms in the 1990s: the first was in 1991 at an all-Prokofiev 'Children's Prom' (8 September); the second in 1995 for a 'Young Person's Concert' with music from six countries (27 August); a Prom of Russian and American music in 1998 (31 August); and an all-French programme the following year (29 August).

On 23 November 1991 the Orchestra presented the London première of the Swiss composer, Frank Martin's Requiem at the Royal Festival Hall as part of 'Swiss Fest 700'.

In 1995 at St. John's, Smith Square it gave a series of concerts called 'London Firsts', each of which included London premières of works such as Rodrigo's Tres Viejos Aires de Danza (16 March), Antonín Tučapský's Violin Concerto, Roger Steptoe's Flute Concerto (18 May), Naji Hakim's Saul of Tarsus (29 June), Malcolm Arnold's Recorder Concerto (2 December) and the world concert première of Frederick Delius's Idylle de Printemps (2 November).

A 'British Concerto Series' followed in 1996 with, for example, Gavin Bryars' Cello Concerto 'Farewell to Philosophy' on 30 October, as did an 'American Connections' series including music by Copland, Bloch, Piston, Kurt Weill and Bernstein, among others.

=== 2000 to the present ===
2002 saw another themed series – 'Passing through Paris' – four concerts devoted to composers, French or otherwise, with Parisian connections. These took place at UCL Bloomsbury, one of them juxtaposing Berlioz' Roman Carnival Overture with Milhaud's Carnaval de Londres.

'A Musical Celebration of the Bloomsbury Group' featured works ranging from John Blow, Handel, Ethyl Smyth and Elgar to Britten, Bridge and Debussy (22 June 2004).

As part of the 2009-10 'Polskayear' and with the support of the Polish Cultural Institute, a concert of English and Polish music – Szymanowski, Panufnik and Grażyna Bacewicz – was put on at Cadogan Hall on 14 October 2009.

Composers and pieces featured in the NLO's recordings have naturally had a place in its live concerts, Sullivan, Monkton, Poulenc and Prokofiev among them. Concerts of light music have included pieces found on the 'Light Music Classics' series of discs.

Works by the following British composers have also been programmed: Holbrooke, Finzi, Cyril Rootham, Rawsthorne, Dyson, Howard Blake and Richard Blackford. In keeping with the NLO ethos, lesser-known works by well-known composers have been played, for example Holst's A Fugal Overture, Vaughan Williams' The Running Set and Janáček's Adagio. Other little-known European music to be heard has been by Arensky, Jean Françaix, the Albanian-born Thoma Simaku and the Czech, Vítězslava Kaprálová.

Seldom-performed piano concertos which the New London Orchestra has programmed include those by Andrew Simpson, Howard Ferguson and Reynaldo Hahn.

After initiating its 'Newham Welcomes the World' community project in 2007, the NLO began to focus its concert-giving activity in the London Borough of Newham. This started in March 2009 with a concert at the Stratford Rex featuring the actress Michelle Collins narrating Prokofiev's Peter and the Wolf, followed two months later by a performance at Stratford Circus of Saint-Saëns' Carnival of the Animals.

From the start of the 2011-12 concert season, the NLO became the first orchestra-in-residence at Stratford Circus, starting with a concert on 21 October titled 'Sounds of London' which programmed a variety of shorter pieces by composers with London associations, from Haydn, Ketèlbey and William Alwyn to Stephen Dodgson, Phyllis Tate, Eric Coates and Robert Farnon. The season continued with a showing of the film The Snowman accompanied by the NLO playing Howard Blake’s music live, alongside other Christmas music. A repeat of the live concert of The Snowman took place in 2012.

A concert for the strings of the NLO, 'Modern Music for Strings' on 19 October 2012, saw an original programme of Britten, Barber, Bartók, Corp, Glass' Company, Max Richter's On the Nature of Daylight and Pärt's Cantus in Memoriam Benjamin Britten. This again took place at Stratford Circus.

The NLO's concerts in Newham have aimed to be affordable and accessible to schools and local community groups, with invitations to school groups to attend rehearsals.

=== Other concert activity ===
Since its inception, the Orchestra has accompanied Highgate Choral Society and The London Chorus in many of their concerts, overseas tours and recordings. In these, it has performed repertoire ranging from J. S. Bach to contemporary composers.

In the field of education, the Orchestra has devised projects which use music as a tool to enhance learning in the key curriculum subjects of maths, literacy and science. Following its 'Newham Welcomes the World' community project, the NLO has focused its concert-giving and outreach work in the local community in the London Borough of Newham.

The NLO has also promoted 'Young Performers Concert' series at the Foundling Museum, London, enabling a number of young award-winning musicians and singers in the UK to give their own recitals, the series being supported by the Musicians Benevolent Fund.

== Recordings ==
The New London Orchestra has made over 20 recordings on the Hyperion label. These fall into three categories:

- Four discs of British Light Music Classics and one each of American Light Music Classics and European Light Music Classics.
- Orchestral repertoire by composers such as Poulenc, Reynaldo Hahn, Milhaud, Satie, Prokofiev, Pierné and Virgil Thomson.
- Operettas and musicals by the Victorian and Edwardian composers Arthur Sullivan, Sidney Jones, Lionel Monckton and Harold Fraser-Simson.

A disc released in November 2009 comprises works for string orchestra by Grażyna Bacewicz, giving exposure to this composer little known outside of Poland.

The issue in late 2010 by the NLO (under Corp) of the first digital recording of Rutland Boughton's opera The Queen of Cornwall was designated 'Disc of The Month' in Opera magazine, March 2011 and 'Editor's Choice' in Gramophone, September 2011.

== Education and outreach work ==
The New London Orchestra's curriculum-based education projects have sought to enhance children's learning in maths, literacy and science through music-based activities. The NLO has worked in the London boroughs of Hammersmith & Fulham, Westminster, Camden, Lambeth, Southwark, Tower Hamlets and Newham.

Other projects have included residencies in schools for deaf children, workshops with adults with learning difficulties from 'Look Ahead Housing and Care' centres, Reminiscence Projects with the elderly in Camden, workshops with adults in homeless hostels in Camden, and theatre projects with the Bloomsbury Theatre, including a collaboration with City & Islington College called "Underground Reflections".

Between 2011 and 2013 the JPMorgan Chase Foundation provided funding for the NLO's three-year 'Literacy Through Music' education project which took place at primary schools in Newham.

=== 'Newham Welcomes the World' ===
Between 2007 and 2012 the NLO devised a series of large-scale projects in the Olympic Borough of Newham, working with a variety of people of all ages from across the borough, and collaborating with a number of local institutions including the Theatre Royal Stratford East. Each year, the NLO worked with different groups within the community to create new music and give performances. These included primary and secondary schools, local sports teams, 'Look Ahead Housing and Care' residents and theatre groups, as well as the 'Ascension Eagles' Cheerleaders and 'East London Dance'. One of its projects culminated in the event 'Pass the Baton' at the Stratford Rex in August 2009 featuring local sports teams performing anthems alongside live orchestral music and electronic music by the DJ Excalibah.

Concerts of Britten's Noye's Fludde on 21 and 22 May 2013 at The Chainstore, Trinity Buoy Wharf saw young musicians from Newham Academy of Music and Newham schools playing side-by-side with the NLO’s professionals, and with Newham primary school children performing as the 'Chorus of Animals'. The events were in collaboration with schools in Lille, France, and the Orchestre National de Lille, who mounted a parallel performance on 28 May 2013 at the Auditorium du Nouveau Siècle. The constant between the two countries were the conductor, the adult and child soloists and around 20 French and British children forming part of the Chorus of Animals.
