= Lynching of Arthur Jordan =

1880 murder in Virginia

Arthur Jordan
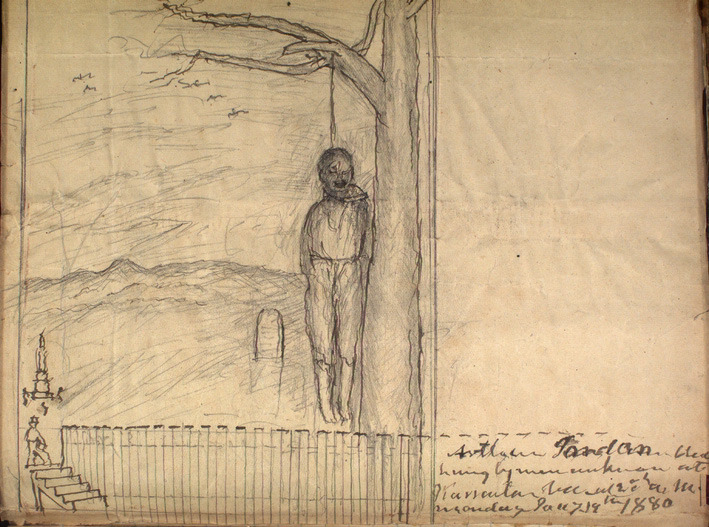
- Illustration of Arthur Jordan's lynching by Dr. Gustavus R.B. Horner.
- Born: 1855
- Died: January 19, 1880 (aged 24–25); Warrenton, Virginia, US
- Cause of death: Murder by hanging
- Resting place: Warrenton Cemetery
- Employer: Nathan Corder
- Height: 5 ft 5 in (165 cm)
- Criminal charges: Alleged miscegenation
- Spouse: Anna Roe (1878-1880)
- Partner: Elvira Corder (1879-1880)
- Children: 2

Arthur Jordan (1855 – January 19, 1880) was a Black man who was murdered via lynching in Warrenton, Virginia, United States by a hooded mob of 50-60 individuals after they kidnapped him from jail. Arthur was lynched by a mob led by Nathan Corder. Nathan had found out his daughter, Elvira, had been in a relationship with Arthur, had become pregnant and had eloped. Arthur was never formally charged with miscegenation.

Jordan had worked for Nathan Corder, the father of Elvira Corder, for several years prior to the two becoming romantically involved.

== Background ==
=== Travel to Maryland ===
When Elvira Corder became pregnant, the two fled from Markham, Virginia, in an act of self-preservation. On December 27, 1879, the two left Fauquier County on same train using different stations, in Markham and Marshall (then called Salem).

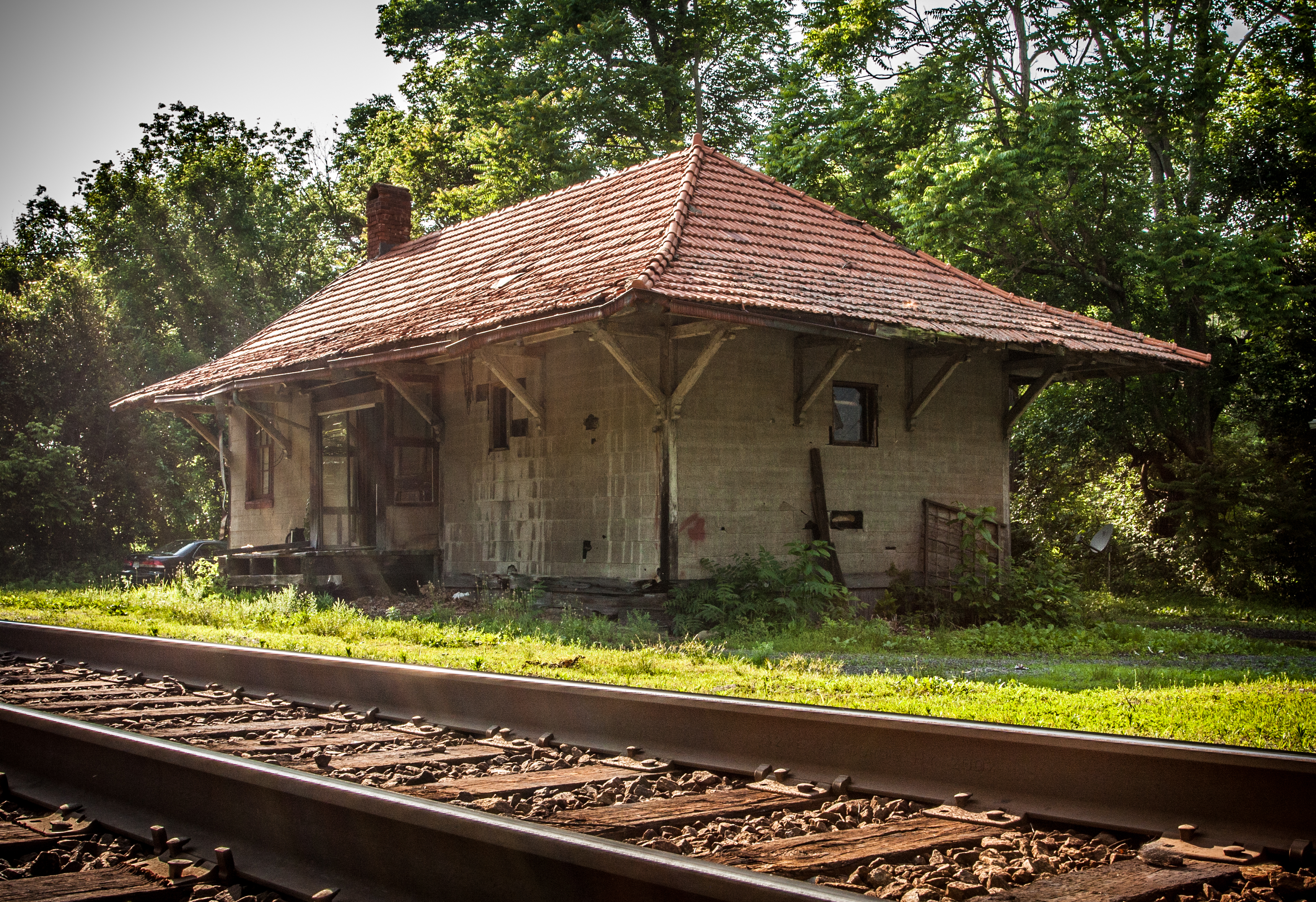
Abandoned Markham train depot.

Once they arrived in Washington, DC, the two found their way to Williamsport, Maryland. There, they found refuge for several days until a resident sent two letters to Fauquier County about having spotted the couple.

=== Search for Arthur Jordan ===
Nathan Corder had failed to locate his daughter and Jordan the night of their escape. Instead, it was not until letters Jordan and Elvira Corder had sent from Williamsport, Maryland, arrived at both the Markham Post office and the Corder's neighbors, that there was a lead on their location. Following this, a search party consisting of Nathan Corder, John Corder, Will Corder, J.B. Stribling, Jaquilin Marshall Jr., Wallace J. Payne, and John Rice Payne, left with the goal of returning Arthur Jordan and Elvira Corder to Fauquier County.

After having been located, Elvira Corder refused return to Fauquier County with the search party and Arthur Jordan. Instead, she remained in Maryland while the search party forced Jordan back to Fauquier County, Virginia.

== Lynching ==
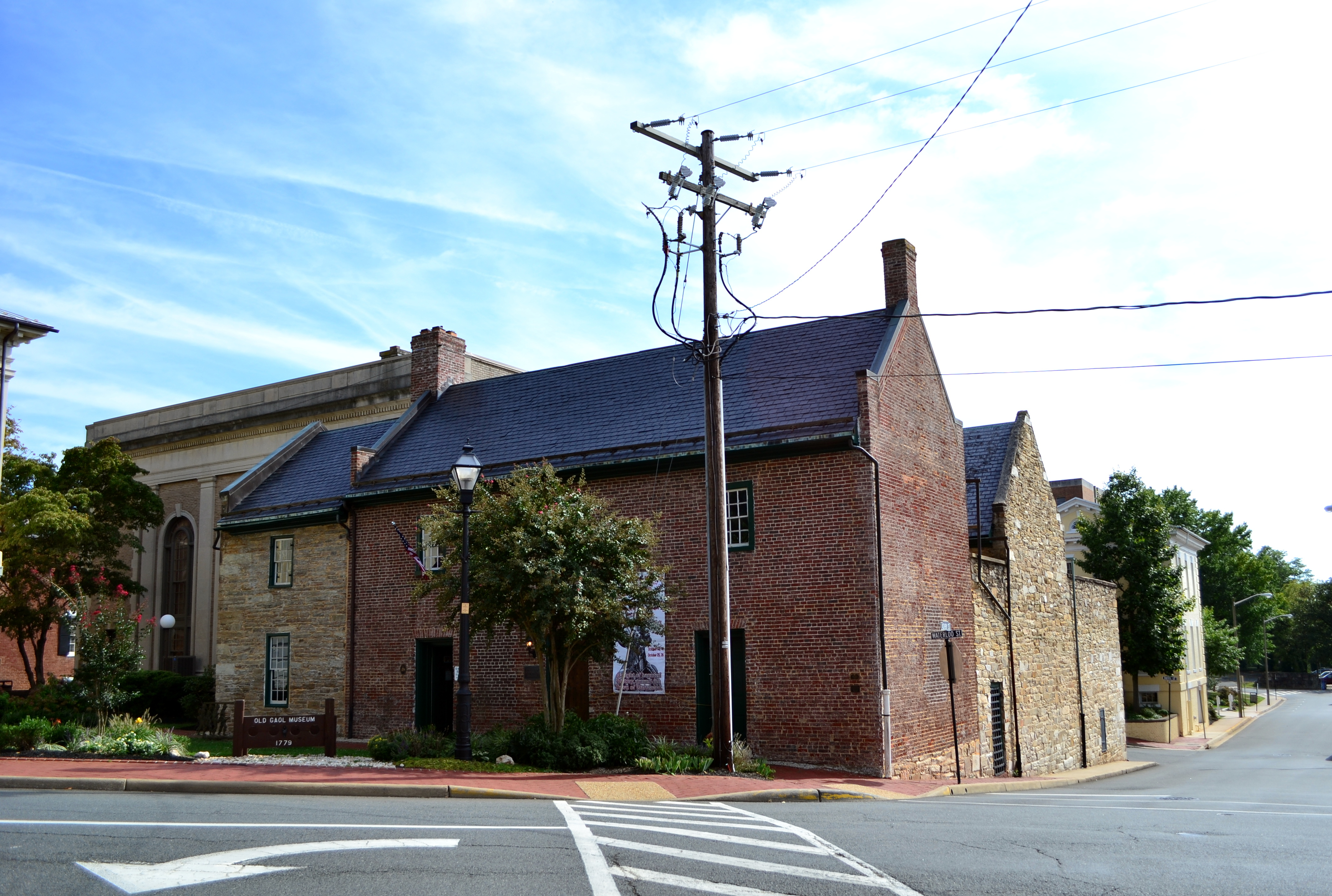
The Fauquier Jail in Old Town Warrenton, where Jordan was confined. Now the Old Jail Museum.

Jordan had been forcibly interred within The Fauquier Jail by his captors following their return.

Around 2:00 AM, a crowd of hooded individuals gathered at the jail. This group claimed to have a Black criminal from a neighboring town to trick the single jailor into opening the door. The hooded men then forced themselves into the building and threatened the jailor with a revolver. At gunpoint, the jailor allowed the lynch mob to enter and remove Jordan from his cell. From there, Jordan was dragged through Warrenton's streets by rope to the Warrenton Cemetery. There, the mob hanged him from a tree, from the noose he strangled to death.

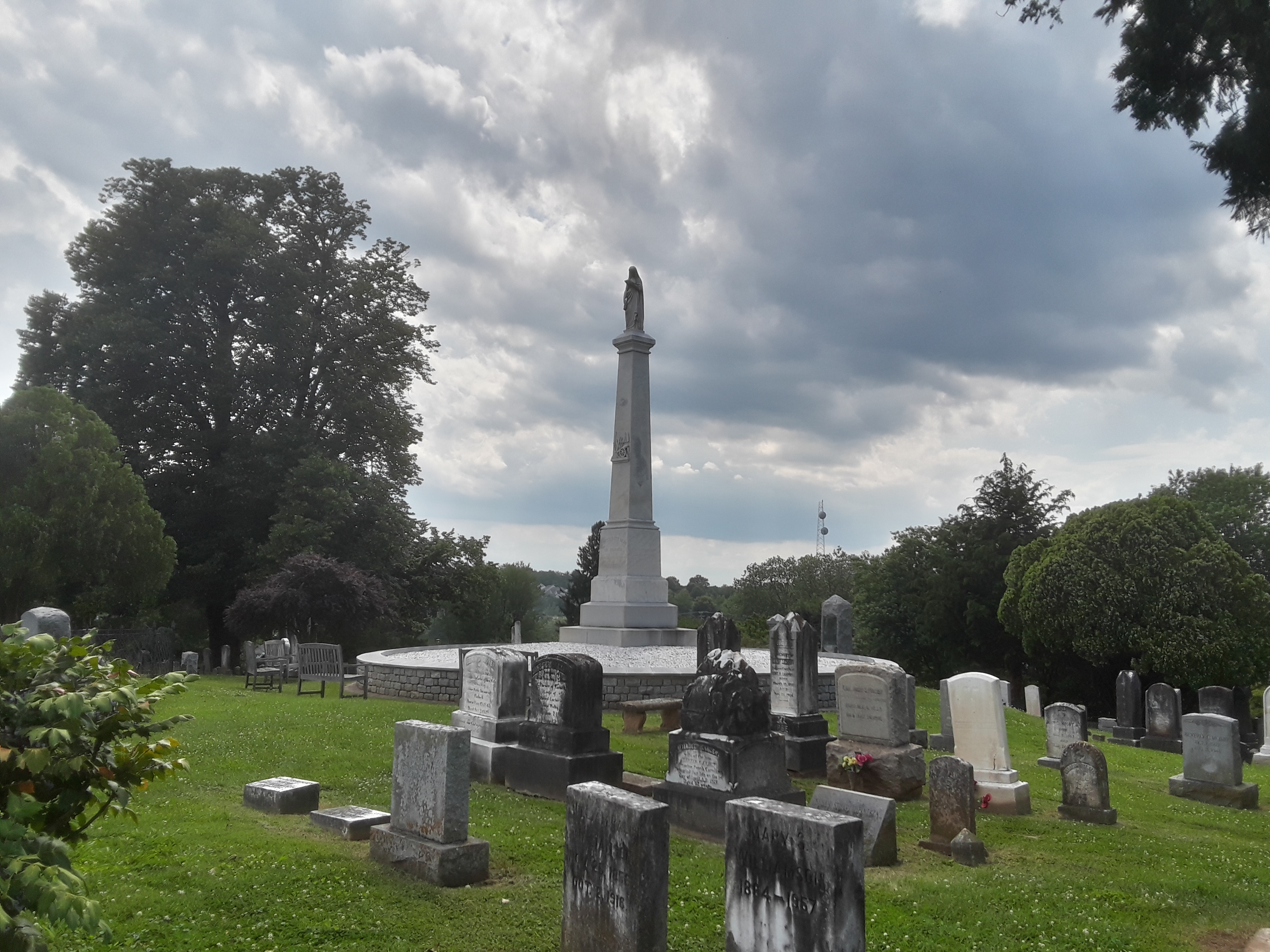
The 1887 Confederate Dead Monument in the Warrenton Cemetery. Arthur Jordan was lynched near this monument.

== News coverage ==
=== White-owned news reporting ===
This specific event was covered by a large number of local media sources, including the Alexandria Gazette, The Washington Post, Staunton Spectator, The Baltimore Sun, the Warrenton Solid South, the Richmond Dispatch, the Loudoun Times-Mirror, The Evening Globe, and The Leesburg Mirror.

Jordan's lynching was also covered by newspapers geographically further away, including in Delaware, Louisiana, Missouri, New York, Ohio, Pennsylvania, Texas, Australia, and New Zealand.

Due to the political and social climates of the Jim Crow south, most media articles portrayed Nathan Corder and those who lynched Jordan as heroic victims.

=== Black-owned news reporting ===
The event was covered in the Richmond Planet. The People's Advocate, a Black-owned newspaper based in Washington, D.C., wrote of Jordan's 'crime', noting, "in no town in Virginia has there been more questionable relations between white men and colored women than in Warrenton," noting how White men often raped Black women.

== Impact ==
The National Memorial for Peace and Justice in Alabama is dedicated to remembering those who were victims of racially-motivated lynching between 1877 and 1950. The names of those victims are carved on large "headstones," categorized by geographic areas in the United States. Arthur Jordan's name is located on Fauquier County's headstone within the memorial.

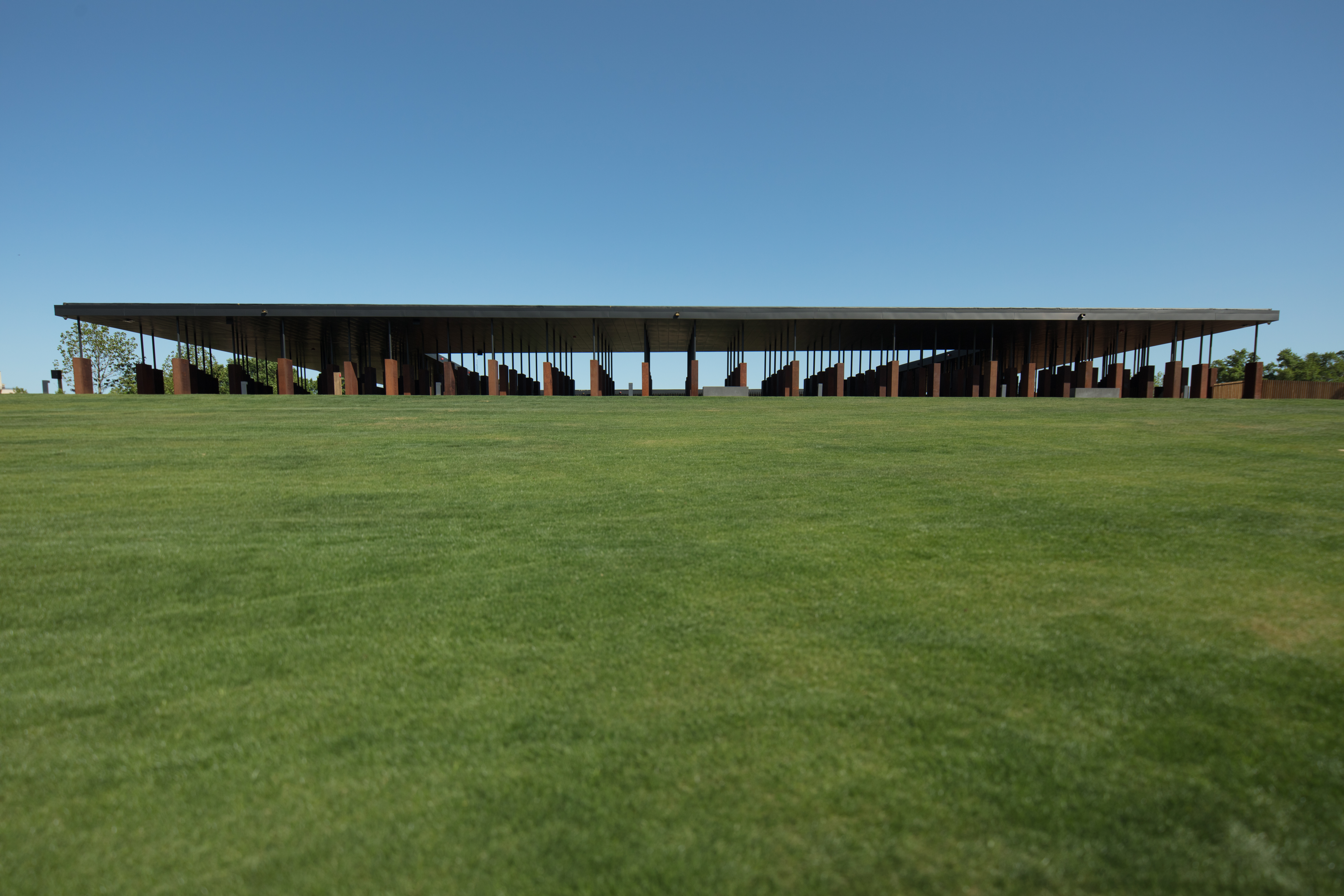
The National Memorial for Peace and Justice.

James Madison University's Racial Terror: Lynching in Virginia Research Project has included Jordan as victim VA1880011901.

Journalist Jim Hall released a book in the summer of 2023 on Arthur Jordan's lynching titled Condemned for Love in Old Virginia: The Lynching of Arthur Jordan. Hall embarked on a book signing and lecture tour in the areas surrounding Jordan's lynching following its release.
