= Juan Jose Chuquisengo =

Juan José Chuquisengo
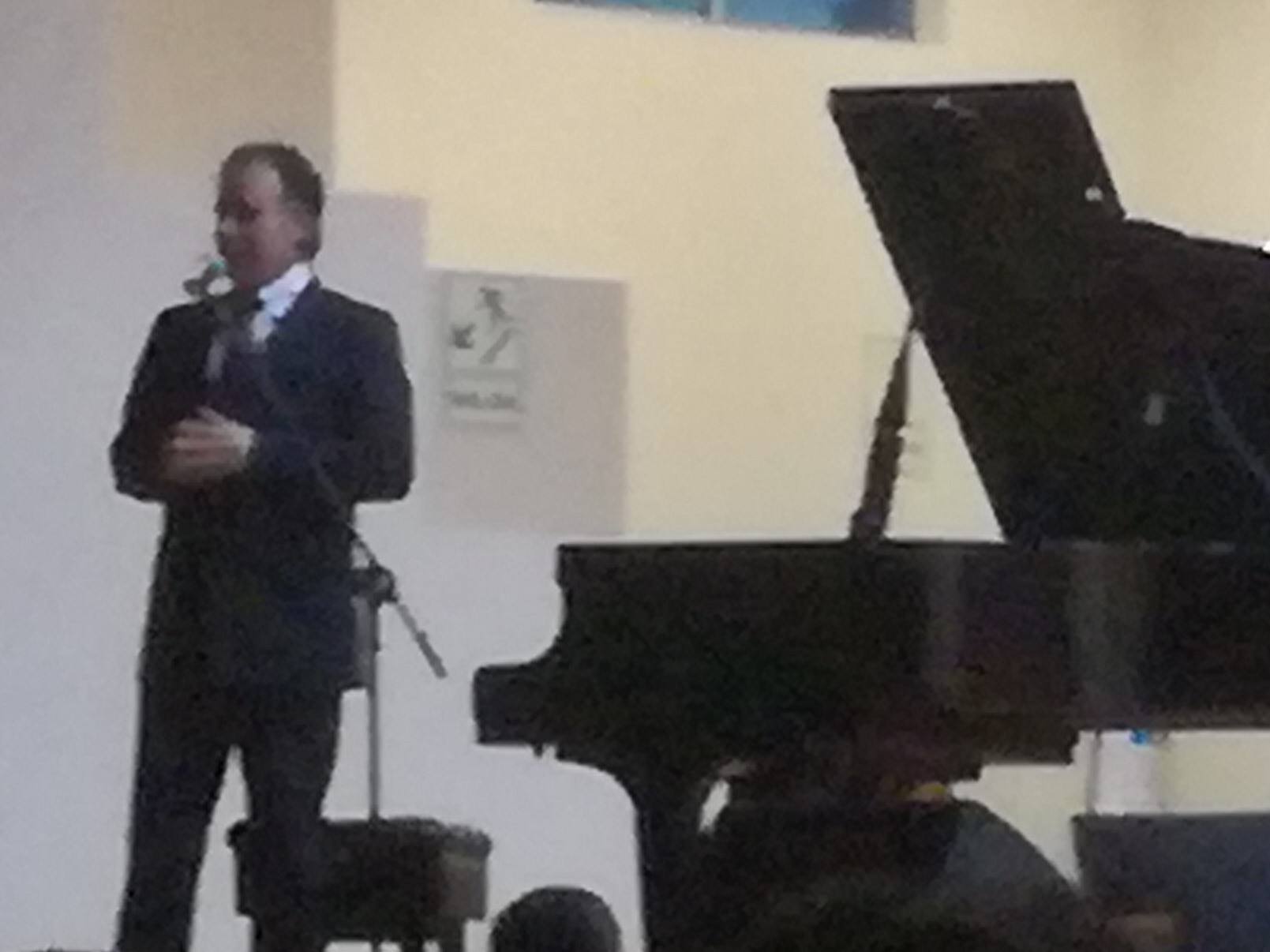
- Presentation of the pianist Juan José Chuquisengo at the inauguration of the celebrations of the Faculty of Sciences and Engineering for the 100th anniversary of the PUCP.

Background information
- Born: Peru
- Genres: Classical, world
- Occupation: Concert pianist
- Instrument: Piano
- Label: Sony Classical
- Website: Juan Jose Chuquisengo

Juan José Chuquisengo is a Peruvian concert pianist and soloist, specializing in classical and world music. Chuquisengo's Trascendent Journey was considered one of the "best 100 classic CDs ever" by Die Besten 100.

Since 2020 he has published hundreds of recordings SPOTIFY, YOUTUBE and other internet platforms, with millions of streamings in over hundred countries

SPOTIFY: https://open.spotify.com/artist/5WS9Y9DWDTwXMz3Ot01vsL

YOUTUBE: https://www.youtube.com/channel/UCh72MwFSPvz6m-RBh4CCDHA

Chuquisengo received a fellowship award from the Kennedy Center for the Performing Arts.

== Early life and career ==
Chuquisengo was born in Peru, where he taught himself how to play music by sound. He studied at a local conservatory, eventually traveling to Europe and meeting conductor Sergiu Celibidache, who became his mentor. Chuquisengo studied under Celibidache for seven years in Germany, Italy and France and then relocated to New York City. Chuquisengo studied composition, orchestral conducting, philosophy and arts, and explored Improvisation in the area of World Music. He frequently tours Europe, America and Asia and teaches at universities and music institutions. He was invited in November 2012 by the Barenboim Foundation to teach at the Orchestral Academy in Seville.

== Personal life ==
Chuquisengo lives in Munich, Germany. He holds a black belt in Karate-Do and teaches Karate, Kung Fu and Tai Chi.

== Discography ==
His works include:

Since 2020 he has published hundreds of recordings in SPOTIFY, YOUTUBE and other internet platforms

SPOTIFY: https://open.spotify.com/artist/5WS9Y9DWDTwXMz3Ot01vsL

YOUTUBE: https://www.youtube.com/channel/UCh72MwFSPvz6m-RBh4CCDHA

Last CDs

- Piano Recital
- Piano Recital II
- Maurice Ravel: Piano Works
- Transcendent Journey
