= Grażyna Bacewicz =

Polish composer and violinist (1909–1969)

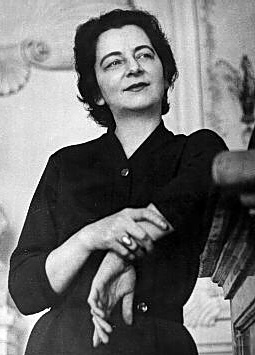
- Grażyna Bacewicz before World War II

Background information
- Born: 5 February 1909; Łódź, Congress Poland, Russian Empire
- Died: 17 January 1969 (aged 59) Warsaw, Poland

Grażyna Bacewicz Biernacka ([ɡraˈʐɨna baˈt͡sɛvit͡ʂ]; 5 February 1909 – 17 January 1969) was a Polish composer and violinist of Lithuanian origin. She is the second Polish female composer to have achieved national and international recognition, the first being Maria Szymanowska in the early 19th century.

== Life ==
Bacewicz was born in Łódź on February 5, 1909 to parents Maria and Vincas Bacevičius. Her father, having been from Lithuania, instilled a deep connection to their Lithuanian heritage, despite changing his name from the Lithuanian Bacevičius to Bacewicz. He also was her first music teacher, and insisted all four of their children study violin, piano, and fundamental music theory from a young age.

Grażyna was the third of four children, with two older brothers, Kiejstut and Vytautas, and one younger sister, Wanda. Vytautas identified as Lithuanian, using his father's original last name (Bacevičius), and also became an accomplished pianist and composer. Grażyna performed her first concert at the age of seven, alongside her brothers, and she wrote her first piece at around thirteen years old.

In 1928, she began studying at the Warsaw Conservatory, where she studied violin with Józef Jarzębski and composition with Kazimierz Sikorski; she also studied piano with Józef Turczyński for two semesters. After graduating in 1932, she attended composition classes led by Nadia Boulanger at the École Normale de Musique. During this time, she continued to play violin, and studied with André Touret and Carl Flesch.

After completing her studies, Bacewicz continued her musical career as both a composer and performer, appearing as a soloist and acting as a jury member for competitions. She served as the concertmaster of the Polish National Radio Symphony Orchestra, directed by Grzegorz Fitelberg from 1936-1938. During this time, the orchestra performed her first violin concerto, as well as her Three Songs for tenor and orchestra. In 1936, she married physician and medical professor Adrzej Biernacki, and the couple had a daughter, Alina Biernacka, in 1942.

During World War II, Bacewicz moved to Warsaw, where she continued to compose and perform in secretive underground concerts, which is where she premiered her Suite for Two Violins. Following the Warsaw uprising, Bacewicz and her family escaped the destroyed city and temporarily settled in Lublin.

After the war, she took up a position as a professor at the State Conservatoire of Music in Łódź. “Bacewicz’s reputation grew during the post-war era, despite the general censorship resulting from political realisation of socialist cultural reforms”. Despite the ideological control of the arts, Bacewicz continued composing from 1945 to 1955, even though it was difficult to perform many of her compositions. With her rising recognition, as well as growing number of awards and commissions, she began to shift her focus towards composition. In 1954, she was involved in a car accident, causing her family minor injuries, but breaking Bacewicz's pelvis and some of her ribs, hospitalizing her for an extended period. This forced her to consider composition as her only occupation, as she was no longer able to perform.

In 1956, the first Warsaw Autumn Festival featured three of her compositions, and at each of the Autumn Festivals in subsequent years, her music became a signature of the events. Her output became prolific during this time, and was widely acclaimed. She continued to compose until her death in 1969 in Warsaw.

== Compositions ==
Many of her compositions feature the violin. Among them are seven violin concertos, five sonatas for violin with piano, three for violin solo (including an early, unnumbered one from 1929), a Quartet for four violins, seven string quartets, and two piano quintets. Her orchestral works include four numbered symphonies (1945, 1951, 1952, and 1953), a Symphony for Strings (1946), and two early symphonies, now lost.

=== Works for solo instruments ===
- Four Preludes for piano (1924)
- Sonata (for solo violin) (1929) – early work, no number
- Children's Suite for piano (1933)
- 3 Groteski for piano (1935)
- Sonata for violin (1941) – premiered at an underground concert in Warsaw
- Polish Capriccio for solo violin (1949)
- Piano Sonata No. 1 (1949) (published in 2022 by PWM)
- Capriccio No. 2 for solo violin (1952)
- Piano Sonata No. 2 (premiered 1953)
- Rondino for piano (1953)
- Two Etudes in Double Notes for piano (1955)
- Sonatina for piano (1955)
- 10 Concert Etudes for Piano (1956)
- Sonata No. 2 (for solo violin) (1958)
- Mały tryptyk [Little Triptych] for piano (1965)
- Esquisse for organ (1966)
- Rybki [Fish] for piano (1967)
- 4 Capriccios for violin (also trans. for viola) (1968)

=== Chamber music ===
- Quintet for flute, oboe, clarinet, bassoon and horn (1932) – First Prize in the Concours de la Société "Aide aux femmes de professions libres", Paris, 1933
- Variations on a Lithuanian Folksong for violin and piano (1934)
- Trio for oboe, violin and cello (1935)
- Sonata for oboe and piano (1937)
- String Quartet No. 1 (1938)
- String Quartet No. 2 (1942)
- Suite for two violins (1943) – premiere at an underground concert in Warsaw
- Sonata da camera, violin and piano (1945)
- Andante sostenuto (4th mov't of Sonata da camera for cello (or violin) and organ)(1946)
- Sonata No. 2 for violin and piano (1946)
- Capriccio for Violin and Piano (1946)
- Sonata No. 3 for violin and piano (1947)
- String Quartet No. 3 (1947) – Polish Ministry of Culture Award, 1955
- Polish Dance for violin and piano (1948)
- Trio for oboe, clarinet and bassoon (1948)
- Polish Capriccio for clarinet and piano (1949, trans. 1954)
- Melody and Capriccio for violin and piano (1949)
- Sonata No. 4 for violin and piano (1949)
- Quartet for 4 violins (1949)
- Oberek No. 1 for violin and piano (1949)
- String Quartet No. 4 (1951) – First Prize, Concours International pour Quatuor a Cordes, Liège, 1951
- Oberek No. 2 for violin and piano (1951)
- Mazovian Dance for violin and piano (1951)
- Sonata No. 5 for violin and piano (1951)
- Piano Quintet No. 1 (1952)
- Lullaby for violin and piano (1952)
- Slavonic Dance for violin and piano (1952)
- Humoresque for violin and piano (1953)
- String Quartet No. 5 (1955)
- Sonatina for oboe and piano (1955)
- Partita for violin and piano (1955)
- String Quartet No. 6 (1960)
- Quartet for 4 cellos (1964)
- Incrustations for horn and chamber ensemble (1965)
- Piano Quintet No. 2 (1965)
- Trio for oboe, harp and percussion (1965)
- String Quartet No. 7 (1965)

=== Orchestral works ===
- Overture (1943)
- Symphony No. 1 (1945)
- Symphony for String Orchestra (1946)
- Concerto for String Orchestra (1948) – Polish State Prize, 1950
- Polish Capriccio for violin and orchestra (1949)
- Symphony No. 2 (1951)
- Symphony No. 3 (1952)
- Symphony No. 4 (1953) – Polish Ministry of Culture Prize, 1955
- Partita for orchestra (1955)
- Variations for orchestra (1957)
- Music for Strings, Trumpets, and Percussion (1958) – Third Prize, Tribune Internationale (UNESCO), Paris 1960
- Pensieri notturni, chamber orchestra (1961)
- Concerto for Symphony Orchestra (1962)
- Musica sinfonica in tre movimenti (1965)
- Divertimento, string orchestra (1965)
- Contradizione for chamber orchestra (1966) – commissioned by Hopkins Center for the Arts, Hanover, New Hampshire
- In una parte (1967)

=== Concertos ===
- Violin
  - Concerto No. 1 for Violin and Orchestra (1937)
  - Concerto No. 2 for Violin and Orchestra (1945)
  - Concerto No. 3 for Violin and Orchestra (1948) – Polish Ministry of Culture Award, 1955
  - Concerto No. 4 for Violin and Orchestra (1951)
  - Concerto No. 5 for Violin and Orchestra (1954)
  - Concerto No. 6 for Violin and Orchestra (1957) – unpublished and never performed [UPDATE: Premiere performance 7 December 2019, Bartłomiej Nizioł, violin; Christoph König, conductor; Warsaw Philharmonic Orchestra / Orkiestra Filharmonii Narodowej. Source: Video on YouTube]
  - Concerto No. 7 for Violin and Orchestra (1965) – Belgian Government Prize, Gold Medal – Concours Musical International Reine Elisabeth de Belgique, Brussels, 1965
- Viola
  - Concerto for Viola and Orchestra (1968)
- Cello
  - Concerto No. 1 for Cello and Orchestra (1951)
  - Concerto No. 2 for Cello and Orchestra (1963)
- Piano
  - Concerto for Piano and Orchestra (1949) – Second prize, Chopin Composition Competition, Warsaw, 1949
  - Concerto for Two Pianos and Orchestra (1966)

=== Music for voice and piano ===
- Róże [Roses] (1934)
- Mów do mnie, o miły [Speak to Me, My Dear] (1936)
- Three Arabic Songs, for soprano and piano (1938)
- Oto jest noc [Here is the Night] (1947)
- Smuga cienia [A Streak of Shadow] (1948)
- Rozstanie [Leave-taking] (1949)
- Nad wodą wielką i czystą [Over the Big and Clear Waters] (1955)
- Dzwon i dzwonki [Large Bell and Small Bells] (1955)
- Boli mnie głowa [I Have a Headache] (1955)
- Sroczka [Little Magpie] (1956)

=== Music for voice with orchestra ===
- Three Arabic Songs, for tenor and orchestra (1938)
- Olympic Cantata (1948) for choir and orchestra – Mention, Olympic Arts Competition, London, 1948; Polish State Prize, 1948. After the 17th-century comedy by Piotr Baryka.
- Acropolis, a cantata for choir and orchestra (1964) – commissioned for the 600th anniversary of Jagiellonian University.

=== Choral works ===
- Zaloty [Courtship] for male chorus (1968)

=== Stage works ===
- Z chłopa król (Peasant King), a ballet (1953) to the libretto of Artur Maria Swinarski
- Przygoda Króla Artura (The Adventure of King Arthur), a radio opera (1959) – Polish Radio and Television Committee Award, Warsaw, 1960
- Esik in Ostend, a ballet (1964)
- Pożądanie [Desire], orchestra, tape – ballet (1969, unfinished; completed by Bogusław Madey)

=== Incidental music, film scores, music for radio broadcast ===
- Mazur [Mazurka], orchestra (1944)
- Farfarello, Róży (1945)
- O Janku co psom szył buty, incidental music (1945)
- Szkice ludowe, radio orchestra (1948)
- Grotesque, orchestra (1949)
- Waltz, orchestra (1949)
- Serenade, orchestra (1950?)
- Wiwat – taniec wielkopolski No. 1, clarinet, string quartet (1950?)
- Konrad Wallenrod, ilustracja muzyczna 1950)
- Krakowiak, orchestra (1950)
- Polish Dance Suite, orchestra (1950)
- Mazovian Dance for cello and orchestra (1951)
- Nocturne for violin and orchestra (from Sonata No. 5 for violin and piano) (1951)
- Music for animated films (1950s)
- Oberek Noworoczny, orchestra (1952)
- Z chłopa król [Peasant King], orchestral suite for orchestra (1953?)
- Tryptych ludowy, choir, orchestra (1954)
- Nieboskiej Komedii, incidental music (1959)
- Gile, children's song (1960)
- Troilus and Cressida, incidental music (1960)
- Macbeth, incidental music (1960)
- Marysia i krasnoludki, film score (1960)
- Sprawa, incidental music (1961)
- Balladyny, incidental music (1965)
- Mazepy, incidental music (1965)

== Honours and awards ==
- 1933: First prize at the Society of Composers, "Aide aux femmes libres de Professions" in Paris for the Quintet for Wind Instruments
- 1936: Second Prize at the composition competition of the Society for Polish Music Publishing Trio For Oboe, Violin and Cello, an honorable mention for her Sinfonietta for String Orchestra
- 1948: Honourable Mention in the Art competitions at the 1948 Summer Olympics for her "Olympic Games Cantata."
- 1949: Second prize (no first awarded) in the Composition Competition. Frederick Chopin, organized by the Polish Composers' Union in Warsaw for the Piano Concerto
- 1951: First Prize at the International Composition Competition in Liege for String Quartet No. 4
- 1956 Second Prize at the International Composition Competition in Liege for String Quartet No. 5
- 1960: III deposit at the International Rostrum of Composers in Paris for Music for strings, trumpet and percussion
- 1965: Prize of the Belgian Government and the gold medal at the International Competition for Composers in Brussels for Violin Concerto No. 7

In addition, Bacewicz received awards for lifetime achievement. These included the Order of the Banner of Work Class II (1949) and class I (1959), Order of Polonia Restituta Cavalier (1953) and Commander's Cross (1955), and the 10th Anniversary Medal of the Polish People's Republic (1955).

On the centenary of her birth, Polish Post issued a stamp, with a portrait of the artist.

== Recordings ==
The Silesian String Quartet's recording of all seven of Bacewicz's string quartets was selected as Gramophone's "Recording of the Month" in August 2016. Richard Bratby writes, "it's difficult not to be convinced that these works constitute an achievement worthy to stand alongside the quartet cycles of Tippett, Britten, Shostakovich and Bartók." The CPO and Chandos labels have both been issuing surveys of her orchestral pieces.

== Sources ==
- Anon. 2014. "Grażyna Bacewicz". Culture.pl website (accessed 27 May 2015).
- Anon. 2011. Inlay note to Chandos recording of Violin Concertos 2, 4, & 5, CHAN 10673. OCLC 756272571.
- Bacewicz, Grażyna. n.d. "Letters of Grażyna Bacewicz and Vytautas Bacevičius (1945–1969; part I): Letters of Grażyna Bacewicz to Vytautas Bacevičius", edited by Małgorzata Janicka-Słysz, English translation by Jan Rybicki. University of Leipzig website (accessed 21 April 2016).
- Lein, Ed. 2008. "Monday, December 8 @ 6:15 pm: Polish Music for Violin and Piano". music@main (Jacksonville, Florida Public Library) blogspot (accessed 27 May 2015.
- Nevermann-Körting, Uta (29 March 2006). "Grazyna Bacewicz". Musikvermittlung und Genderforschung: Lexikon und multimediale Präsentationen. Translated by Nancy Schumann. Hochschule für Musik und Theater Hamburg.
- "Grażyna Bacewicz". Olympedia.
- Thomas, Adrian. 2001. "Bacewicz, Grażyna". The New Grove Dictionary of Music and Musicians, second edition, edited by Stanley Sadie and John Tyrrell. London: Macmillan (subscription, Wikilibrary access, or UK public library membership required).
