= Paul Leroy =

French painter

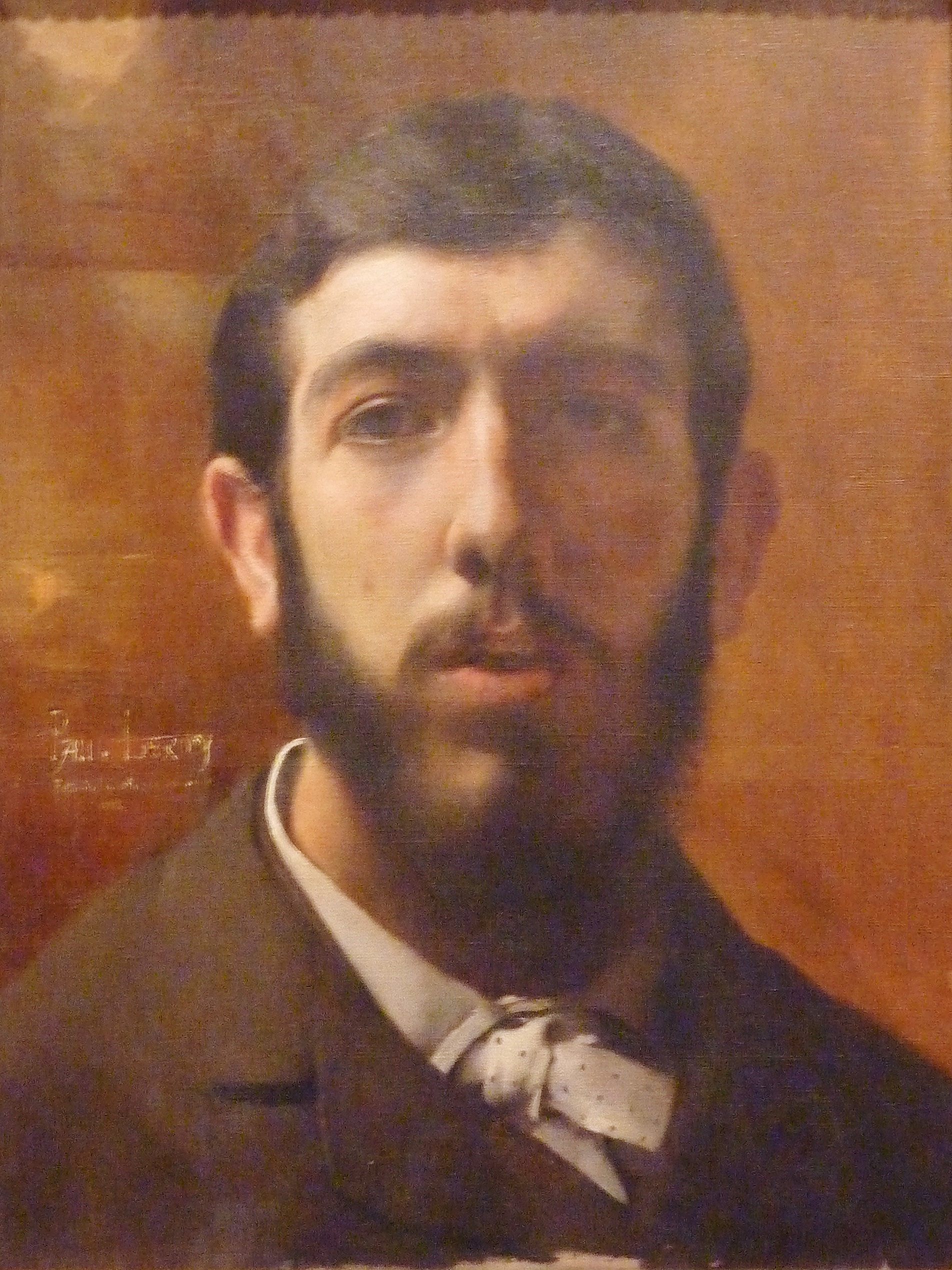
- Self Portrait by Paul Leroy
- Born: Paul Alexandre Alfred Leroy; 1860; Paris, France
- Died: 1942 (aged 81–82)
- Known for: Painting, lithography
- Movement: Orientalist

Paul Alexandre Alfred Leroy (1860 in Paris – 1942) was a French painter noted for Orientalist works. He was a founding member of the Société des Peintres Orientalistes Français (Society for French Orientalist Painters) and designed the Society's first logo.

== Life and career ==
French by birth, Leroy spent his childhood in Odessa, where his father had a business. He lived in Odessa until age 17 years, which gave him interest in the East. In Paris, he studied at the École des Beaux-Arts. He first exhibited in 1882 and was awarded a medal.

At Beaux Artes, he met Georges Landelle (1860–1898), an Orientalist painter and the pair became life-long friends. In 1885 he visited Turkey and Egypt, with Landelle and Landelle's father. In 1886 journeyed to Tunisia and Algeria, returning to the country's southern region several times during the 1880s and 1890s. During this period, Leroy studied the Arabic language, which enabled him to use the Arabic script effectively in a number of paintings and lithographs.

In 1893, Leroy, along with artists, Maurice Bompard, Eugène Girardet, Alphonse-Étienne Dinet, Jean-Léon Gérôme, Jean-Joseph Benjamin-Constant and art historian, Léonce Bénédite, became founding members of the Société des Peintres Orientalistes Français which was responsible for promoting Orientalist art, mounting exhibitions and generally encouraging artists who wished to travel to the Orient. The Society appropriated a logo designed by Leroy and used it on all their correspondence, catalogs, posters and menus. The logo incorporated the sickle moon, the star of David and the black hand of Fatma. The image represents Frenchmen as outsiders, who nevertheless dream of cultural integration and synthesis. Leroy's lithographs were also used extensively in the Society's graphic artwork including menus, posters and brochures.

== Work ==
During his career, LeRoy painted both Orientalist scenes and religious paintings. He worked in oil, watercolours and also made lithographs.

Leroy's Portrait de sa mere is a parody of Whistler's Portrait of the Painter's Mother and won the Prix du Salon in 1884.

== Select list of paintings ==
- A Harem Beauty n.d.
- The Harem Dance n.d.
- Inside the Harem n.d.
- A Kabyle Student, 1892
- The Girls of Atlas, 1901
- The Musicians
- Musical Interlude
- Woman Embrodering
- An Oasis in the Sahara
- Martyr d'Amour
- Portrait of a Young Girl
- Young Women at the Cemetery
- Weaver in Biskra, Algeria

== Gallery ==
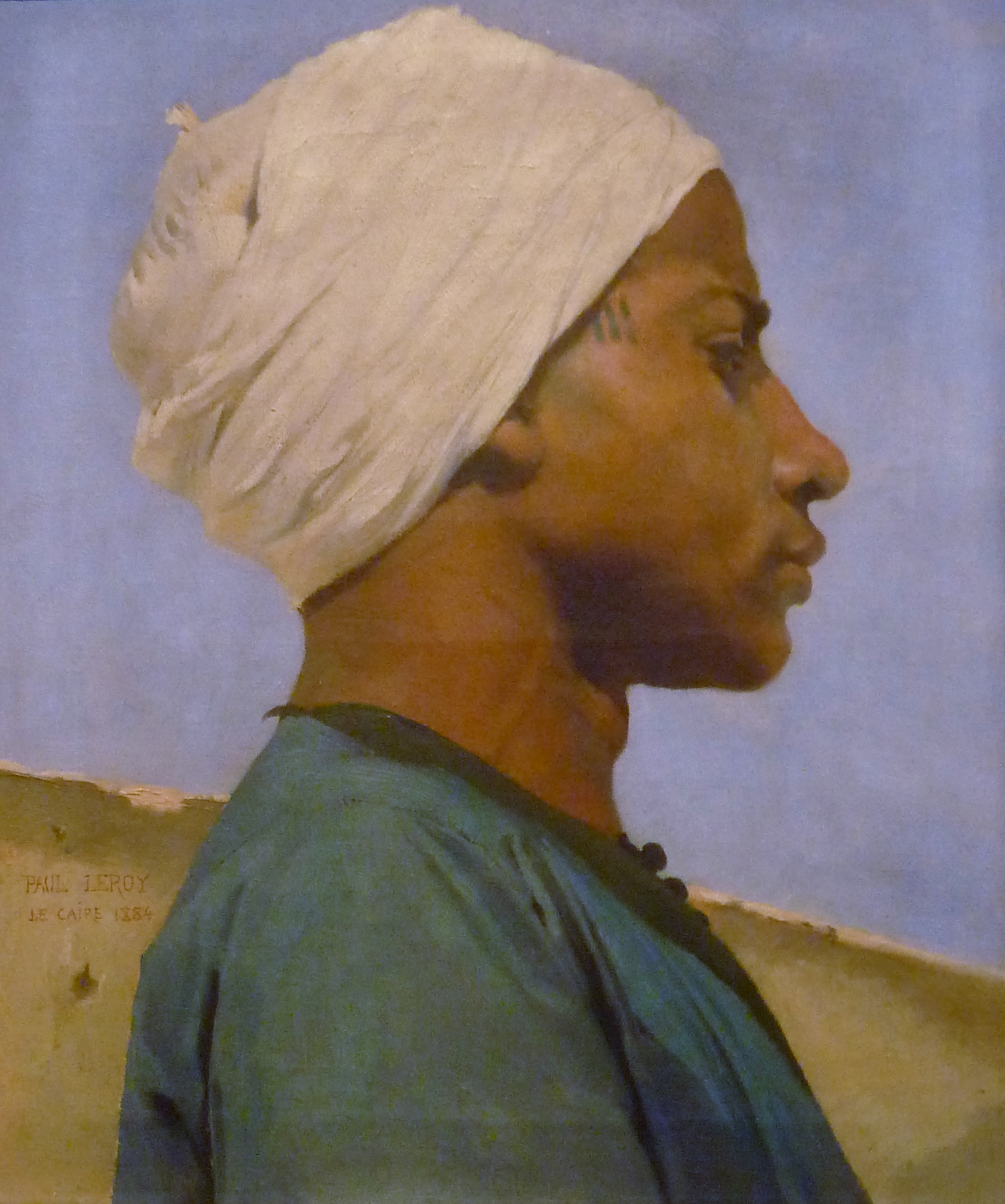
A Young Arab Guide

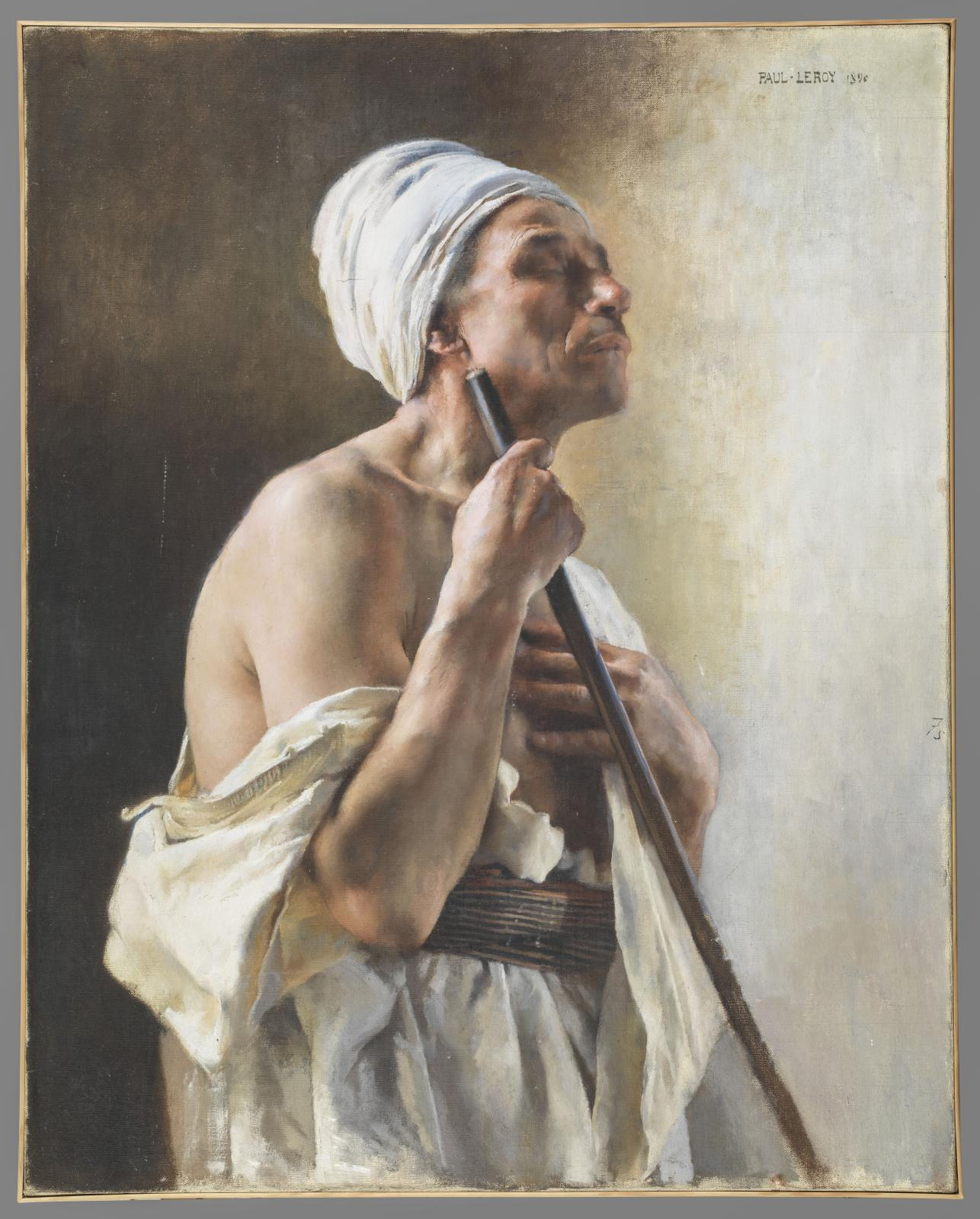
A Blind Arab

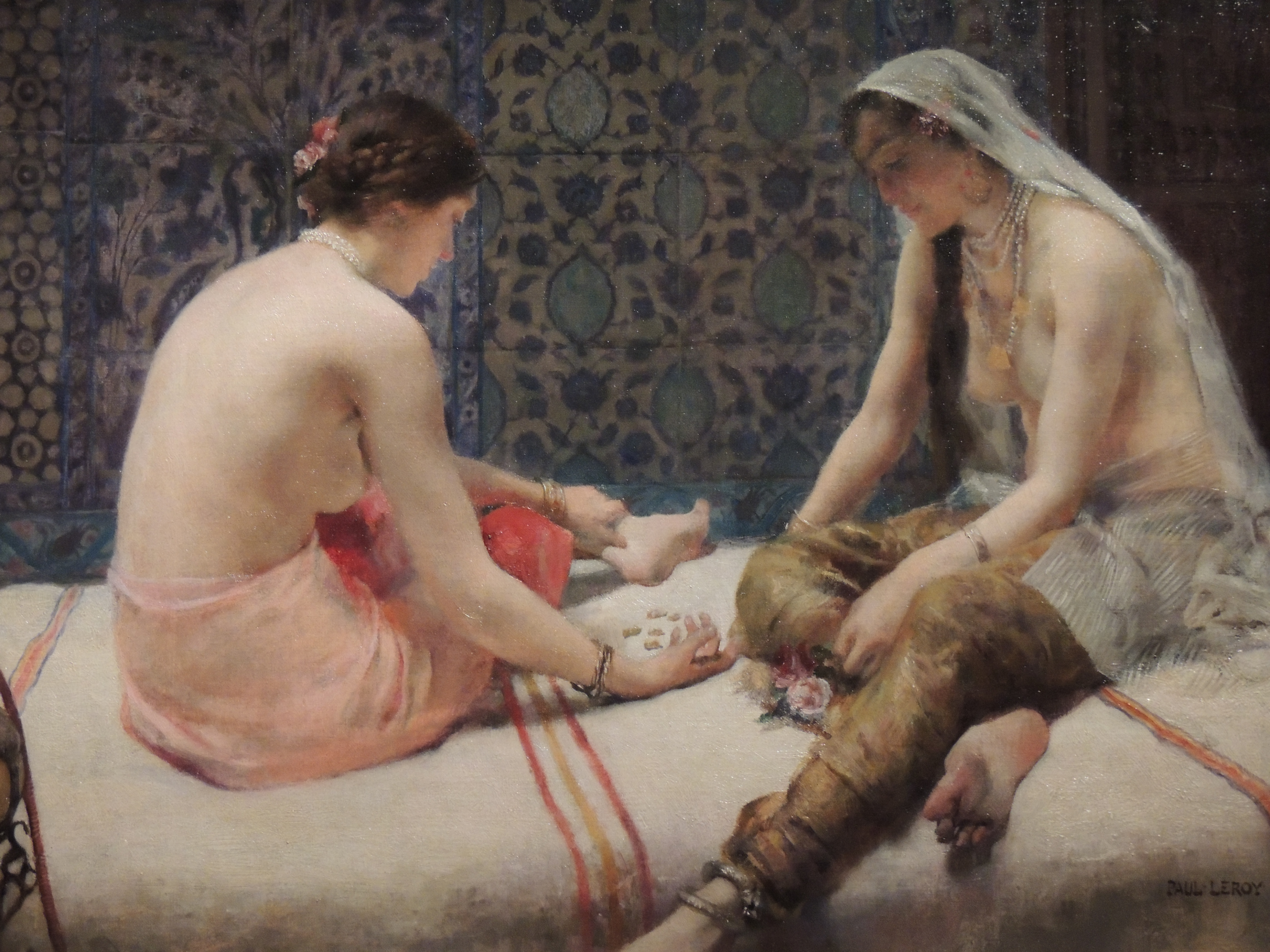
Playing Bones 1898

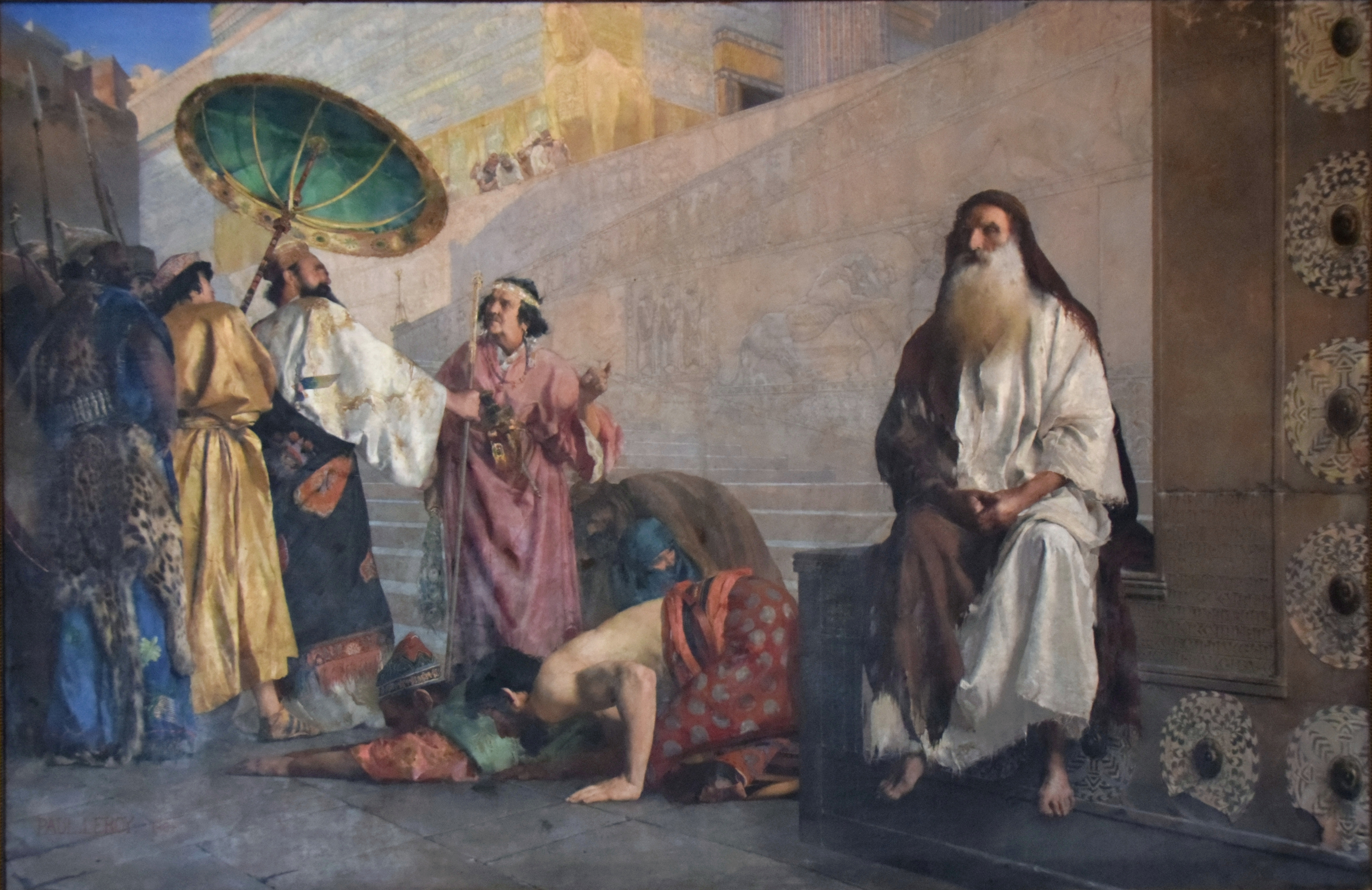
Haman and Mordecai, 1884

In the branches of a large pine tree, Musée de la Chartreuse in Douai

== See also ==
- List of Orientalist artists
- Orientalism
- Société des Peintres Orientalistes Français
