= Société des Peintres Orientalistes Français =

French-Algerian art society

The Société des Peintres Orientalistes Français (French pronunciation: [sɔsjete de pɛ̃tʁ ɔʁjɑ̃talist fʁɑ̃sɛ]; "Orientalist French Painters Society") was an art society founded in 1893 to promote not only Orientalism but also the travel of French artists in the Far East.

== Formation and early history ==
Founded in 1893 by the artist Nasreddine Dinet and the art historian and curator Léonce Bénédite, it was an art society to promote not only Orientalist paintings, but also the travel of French artists in the Far East. The group established an Artists' Salon and also mounted displays for French colonial exhibitions.

Founding members were largely from the Algerian group and included Maurice Bompard, Eugène Girardet, Alphonse-Étienne Dinet, Paul Leroy and the art historian and Director of the Musée du Luxembourg, Léonce Bénédite was President from the Society's inception until his death in 1925. Artists, Jean-Léon Gérôme and Jean-Joseph Benjamin-Constant were also named honorary presidents. The scholar, Benjamin has argued that the Society's advent changed the consciousness of French Orientalist painters and sculptors by giving them a sense of "belonging to a communal movement."

The Society used a variety of strategies to encourage members to identify with it. An annual Salon was mounted to exhibit Orientalist works alongside traditional Islamic art. These exhibitions were accompanied by substantial dinners featuring exotic dishes, carefully planned decor and souvenir menus designed by a notable Orientalist artist. Bénédite used his connections to secure patronage for both the Society and individual artists. The Society also published books of lithographs designed to publicise the work of Orientalist artists. Throughout his period as President, Bénédite also used his skills as an art historian and curator to establish Orientalist art as a legitimate genre.

During the society's active period in the late 19th-century and early 20th-century, it was seen as providing tacit support for colonial rule in North Africa and the Middle East. The group established an artists' salon in Morocco and also mounted displays for French colonial exhibitions.

Its activities in the French colonies were soon challenged by a rival society, more focussed on educational and cultural activities in the French colonies, the Société Coloniale des Artistes Français, founded by Louis Dumoulin in 1908.

The secretary Léonce Bénédite was initiator of the Prix Abd-el-Tif in 1907 as an Orientalist equivalent of the Prix de Rome, with a stay at the Villa Abd-el-Tif similar to the stay in Rome at the Villa Medicis offered by the better known prize.

== Gallery ==
The Society's founding members and officials

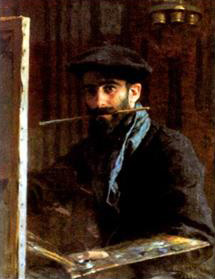
Alphonse-Étienne Dinet, (Self Portrait, 1891), founding member

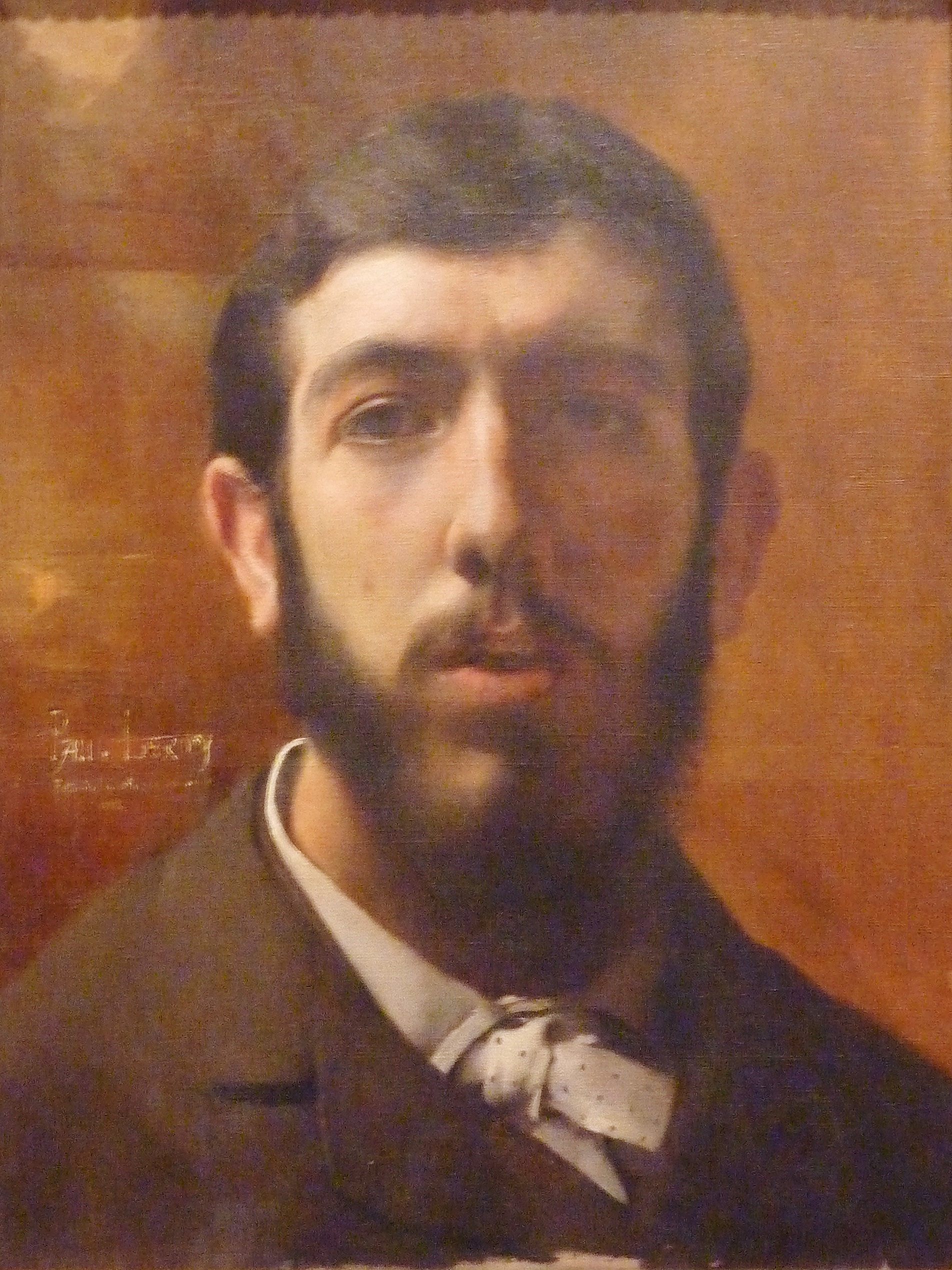
Paul LeRoy, (Self Portrait, 1883) founding member

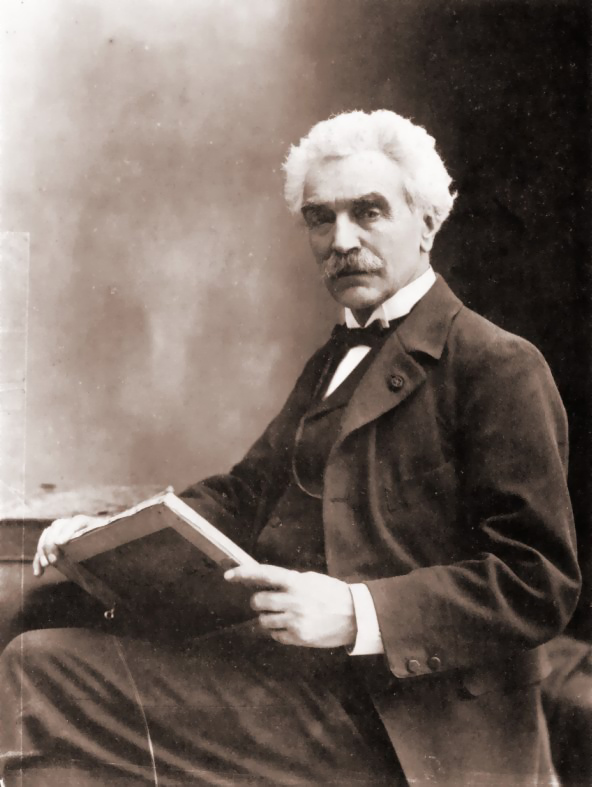
Jean-Leon Gerome, (n.d.) Honorary President

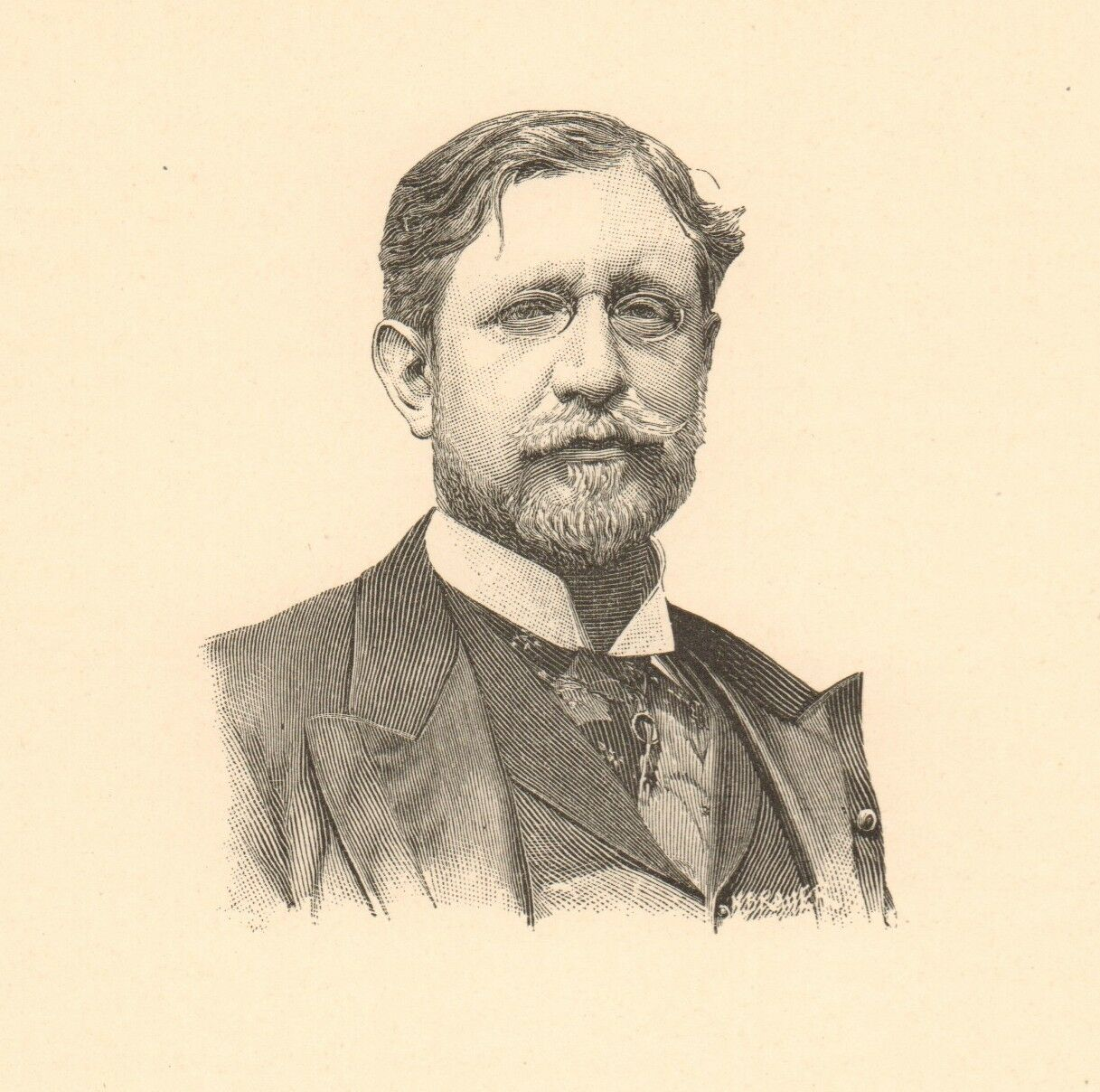
Jean-Joseph Benjamin-Constant, (n.d.) Honorary President

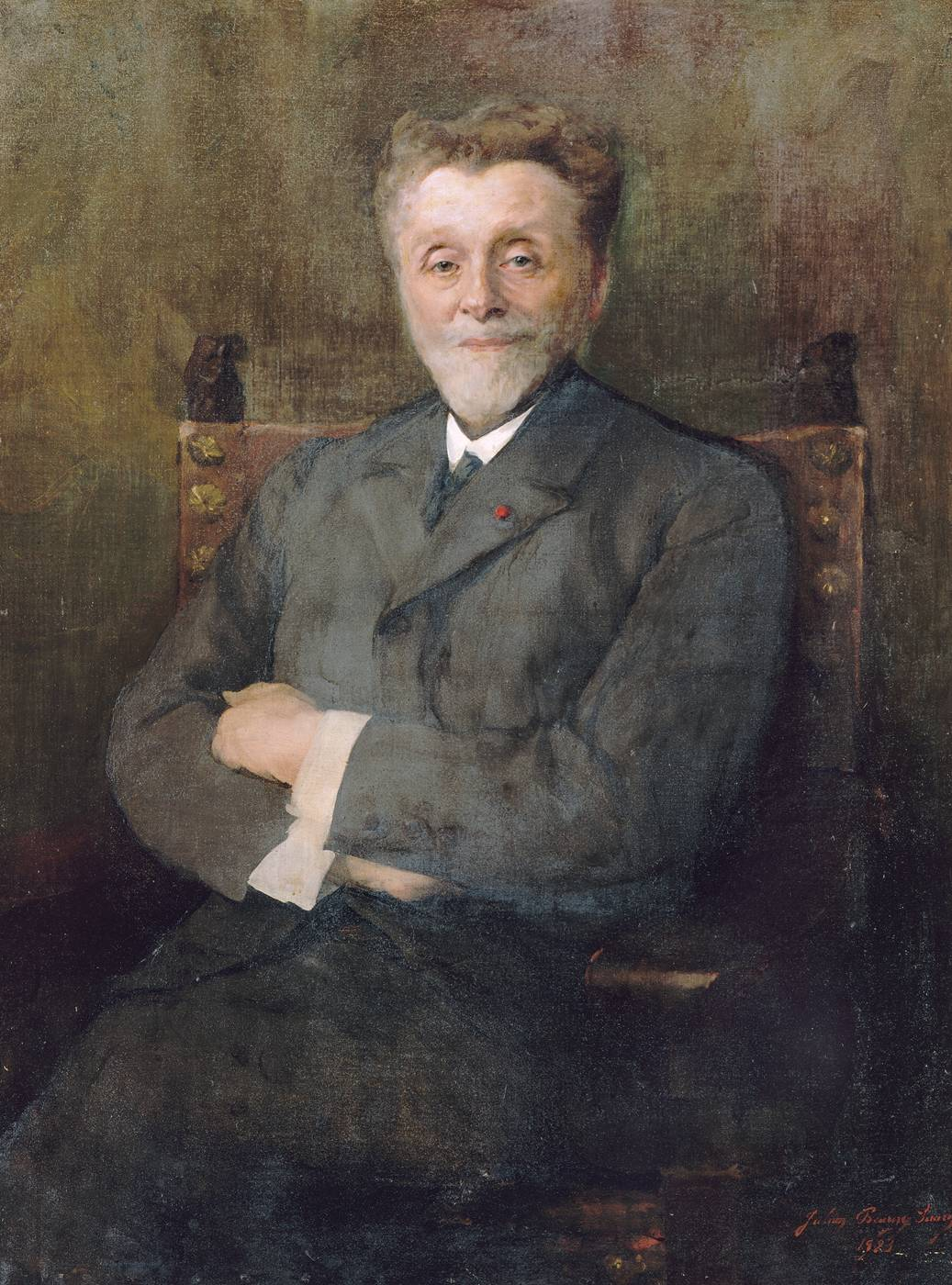
Léonce Bénédite, (1923) President, 1893-1925

== See also ==
- List of artistic works with Orientalist influences
- List of Orientalist artists
- Orientalism
- Orientalism in early modern France
- Oriental studies
