= Jean-Joseph Benjamin-Constant =

French painter (1845–1902)

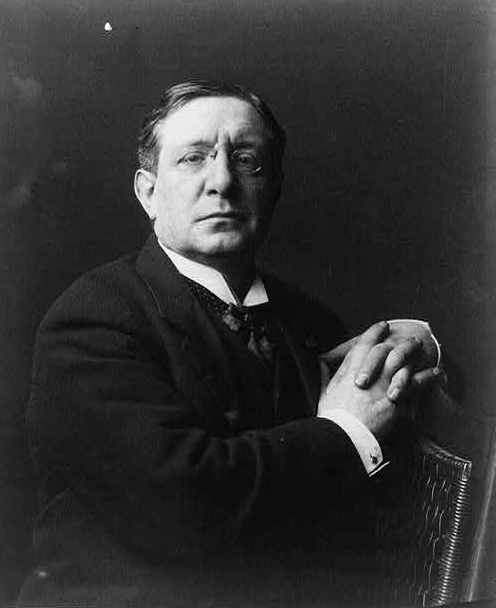
- Frances Benjamin Johnston, Benjamin Constant, c. 1890–1902, Library of Congress
- Born: Jean-Joseph Constant; 10 June 1845; Paris, France
- Died: 26 May 1902 (aged 56); Paris, France
- Known for: Painting, etching
- Movement: Orientalist

Jean-Joseph Benjamin-Constant (also known as Benjamin-Constant), born Jean-Joseph Constant (French: [ʒɑ̃ ʒozɛf kɔ̃stɑ̃]; 10 June 1845 – 26 May 1902), was a French painter and etcher best known for his Oriental subjects and portraits.

== Biography ==
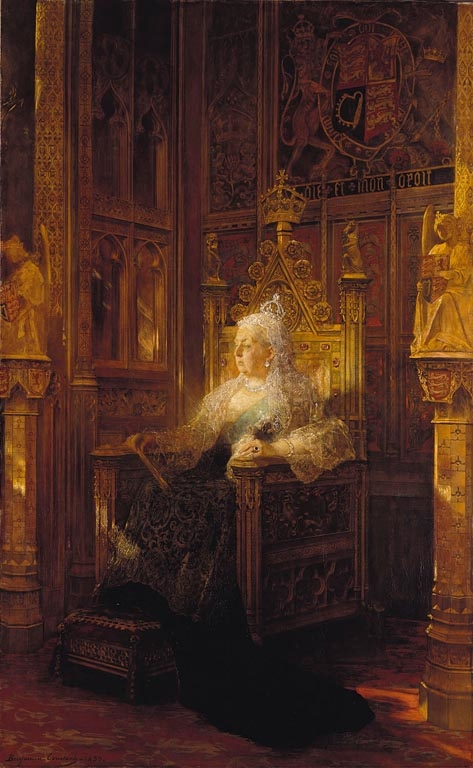
Portrait of Queen Victoria, 1899

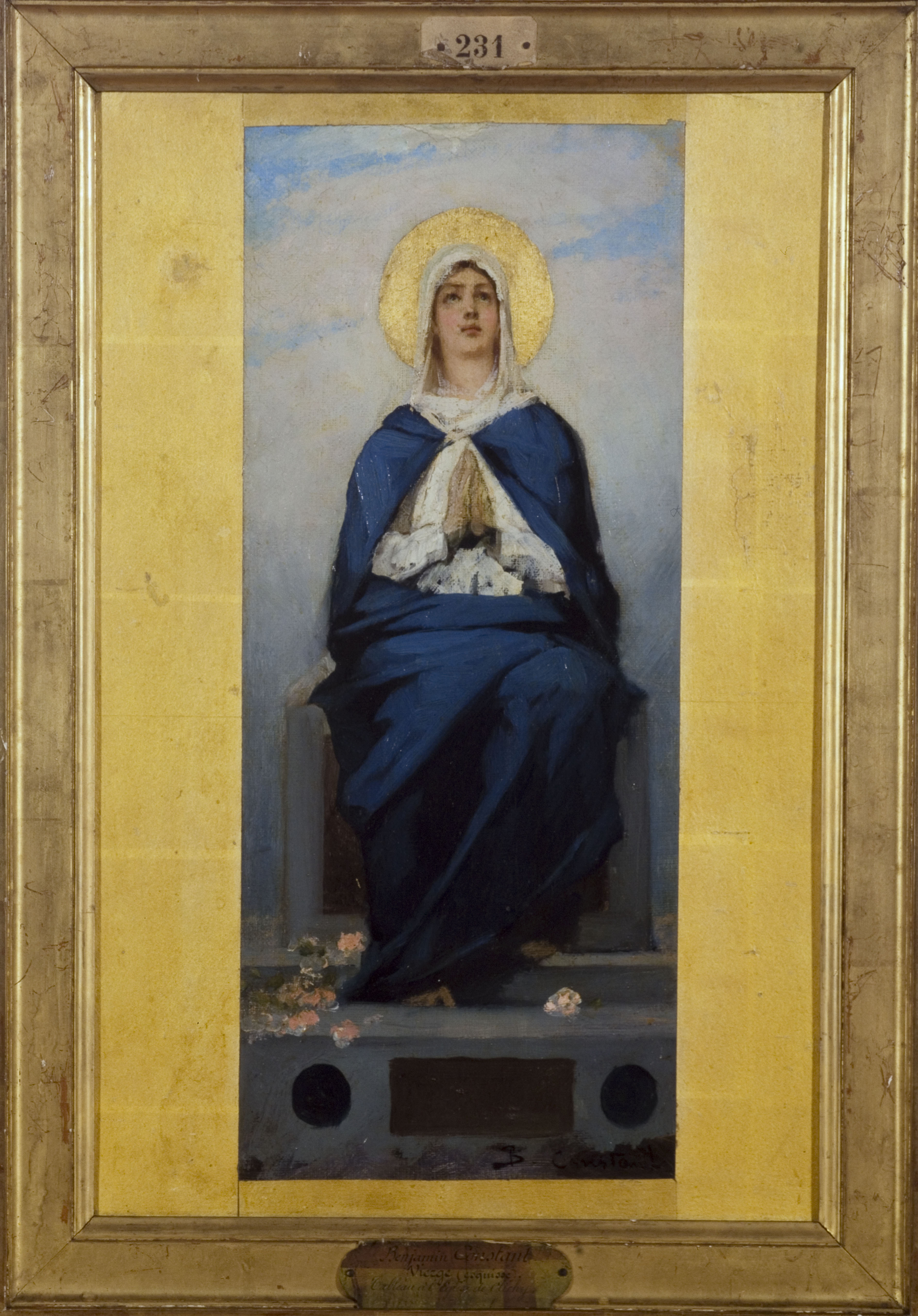
The Immaculate Conception

Benjamin-Constant was born in Paris. He studied at the Ecole des Beaux-Arts in Toulouse, where he was a pupil of Alexandre Cabanel. A journey to Morocco in 1872 strongly influenced his early artistic development and lead him to produce Romantic scenes under the spell of Orientalism. Among his noted works in this vein are Last Rebels, Justice in the Harem (both in the Luxembourg Gallery), Les Chérifas, and Moroccan Prisoners (Bordeaux). His large canvas, The Entrance of Mahomet II into Constantinople (Musée des Augustins Toulouse), received a medal in 1876.

After 1880, he changed his manner, devoting himself to mural decorations and to portraits. Prominent examples include the great plafond in the Hôtel de Ville, Paris, entitled Paris Convening the World; his paintings in the New Sorbonne, representing Literature, The Sciences, and the Academy of Paris; and the plafond of the Opéra Comique theatre. He was distinguished as a portrait painter, especially in England, where he was a favorite of the aristocracy. His portrait Mons fils André (Luxembourg) was awarded a medal of honor at the Salon of 1896.

In 1899 he produced his Portrait of Queen Victoria. Benjamin-Constant painted Pope Leo XIII, Queen Alexandra of the United Kingdom (1901), Lord John Lumley-Savile, and Henri Blowitz (1902). He was made a member of the institute in 1893, and was a commander of the Legion of Honor. He visited the United States several times, and painted a number of portraits. The Metropolitan Museum of Art in New York exhibited a large painting by Benjamin-Constant entitled Justinian in Council. The painting was returned by the Metropolitan to the owners family in 1928. It was purchased by John Ringling in 1929 and is currently on exhibit in the Ringling Museum in Sarasota

Benjamin-Constant also taught at Académie Julian; among his pupils were Henry Ossawa Tanner and Angèle Delasalle, the miniaturist Alice Beckington and the Scottish artist W. S. Shanks. He was a writer of repute, contributing a number of studies on contemporary French painters. Along with fellow artists, Nasreddine Dinet, Paul Leroy, Jean-Léon Gérôme and curator/ art historian, Léonce Bénédite, he was one of the founders of the Société des Peintres Orientalistes Français.

He died in Paris on 26 May 1902.

== Gallery ==
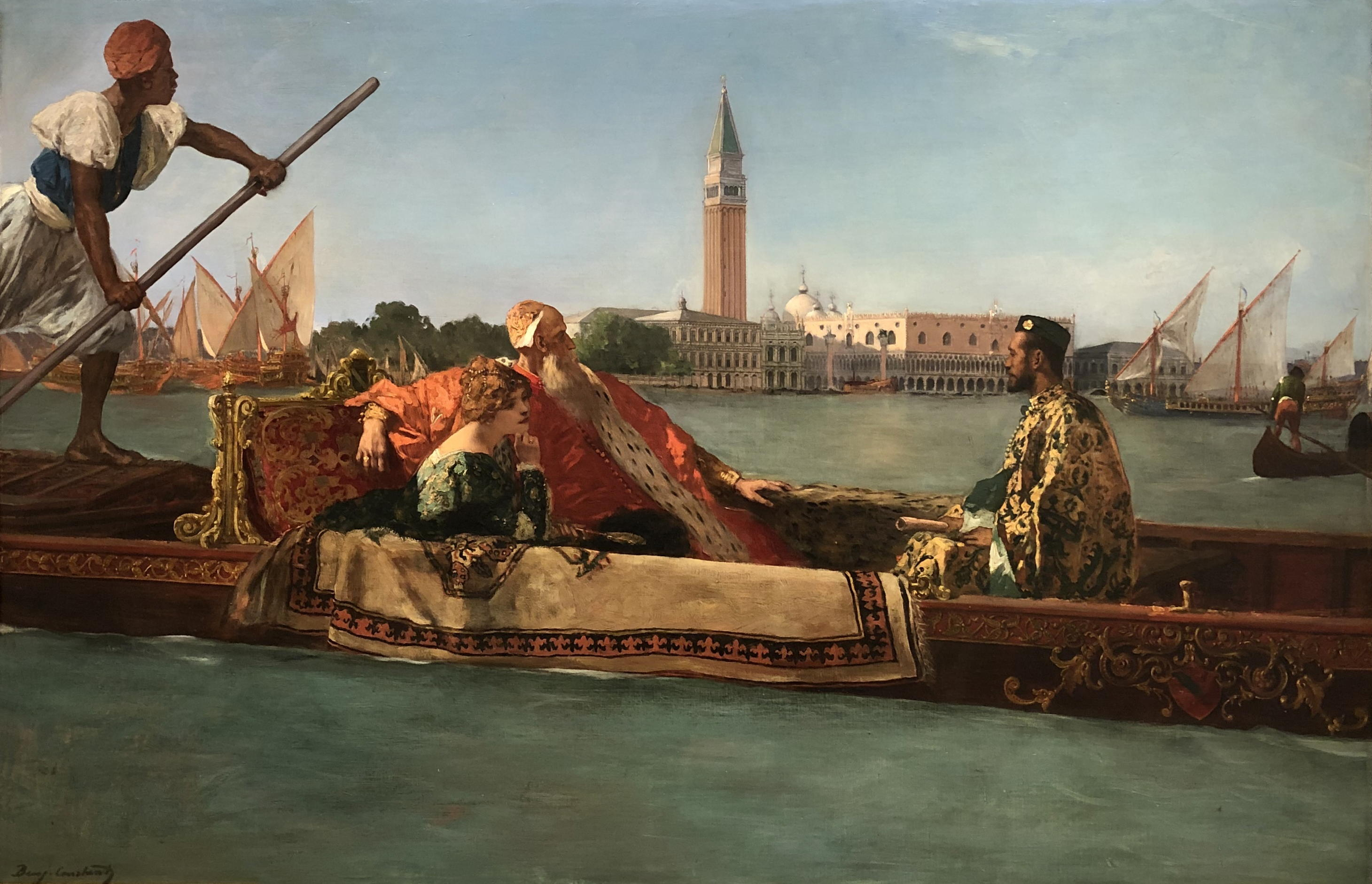
Doge of Venice (c. 1889))
Haggin Museum

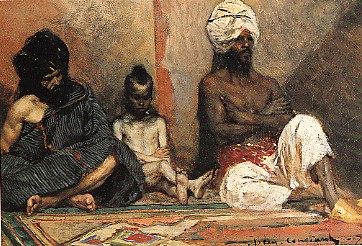
Arabes assis (1877)
Dahesh Museum of Art

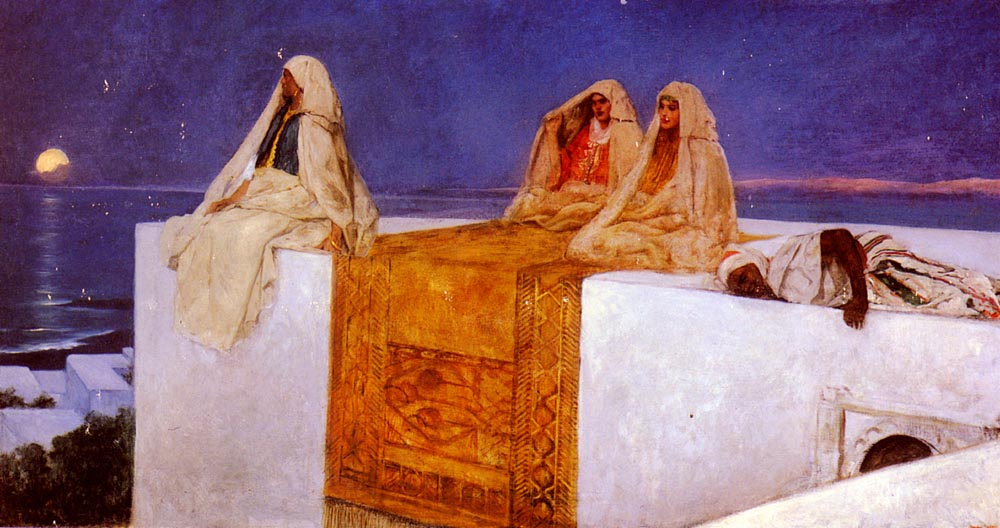
Les nuits arabes
Private collection

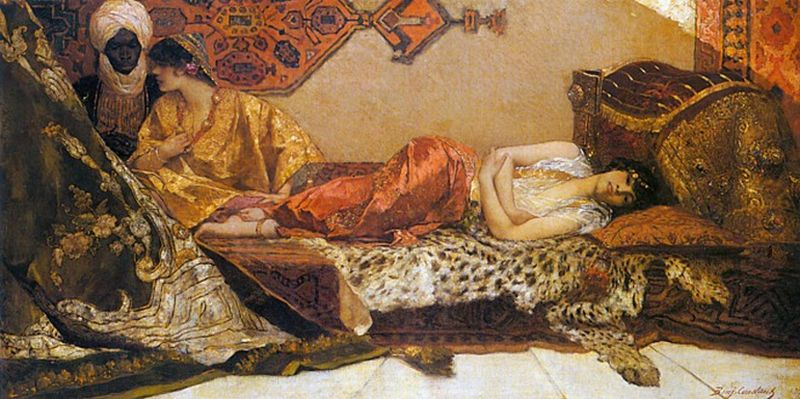
Odalisque (1882)
Private collection

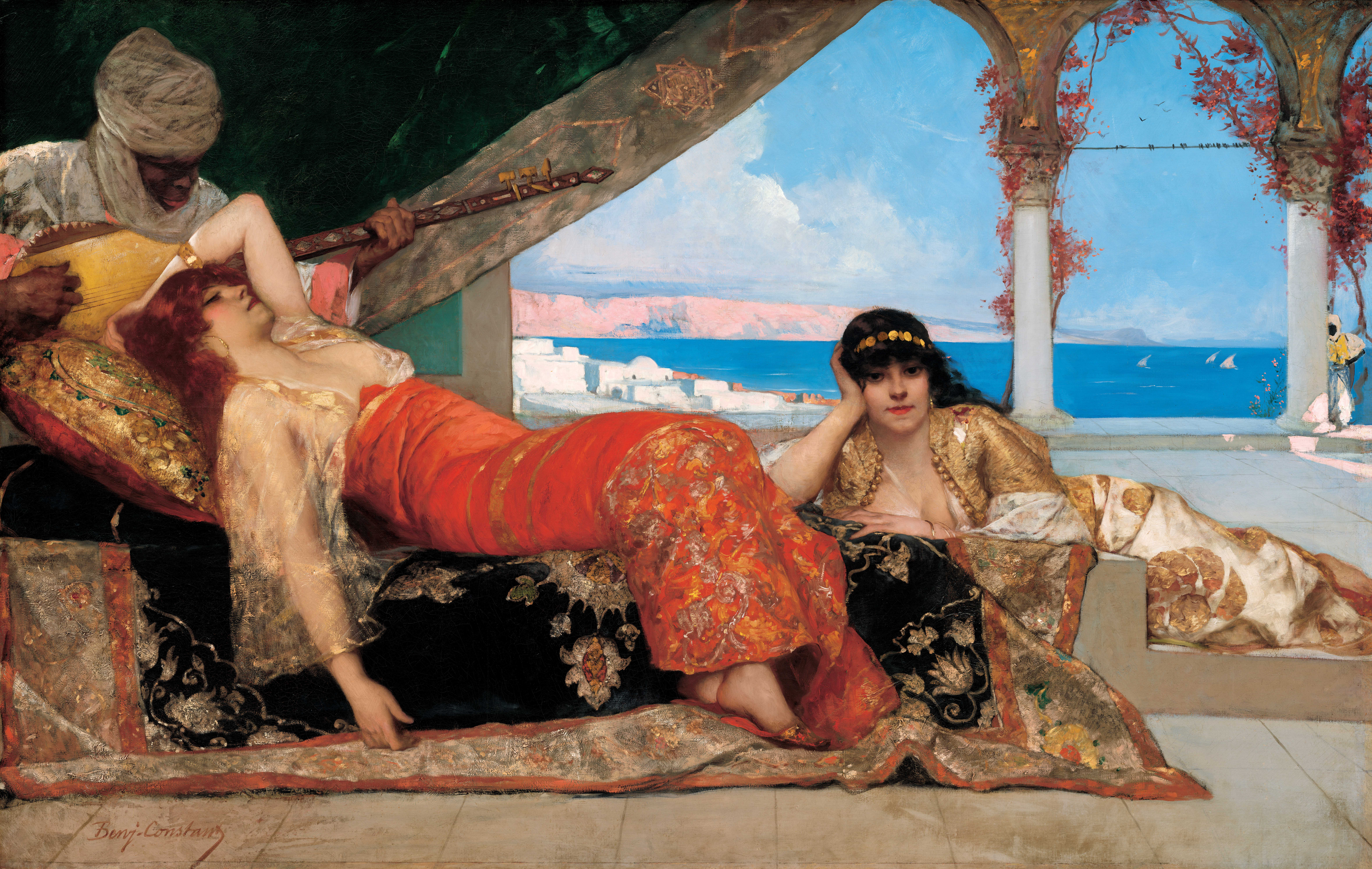
La favorite d'émir (1879)
National Gallery of Art, Washington, D.C.
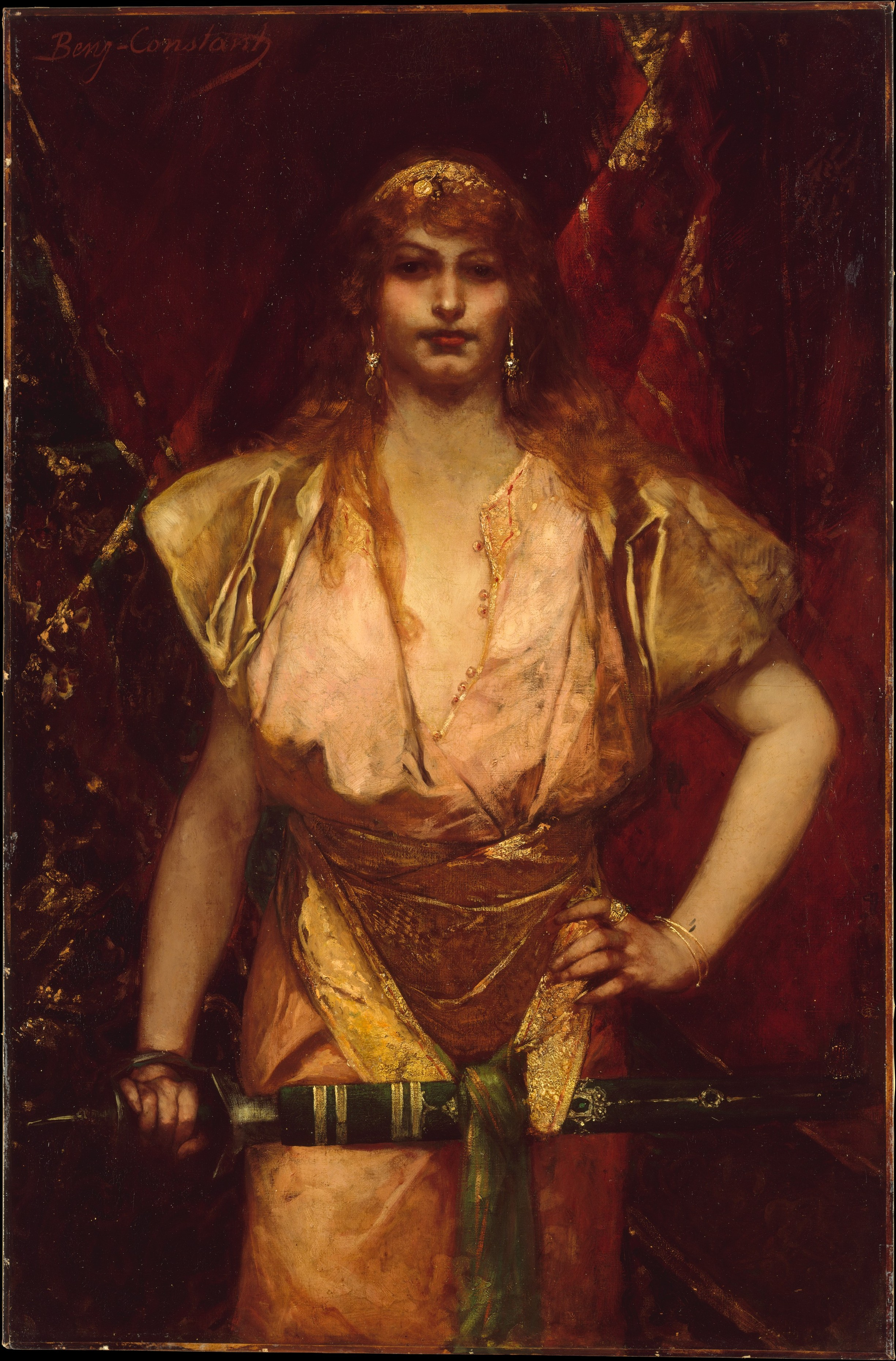
Judith
Metropolitan Museum of Art

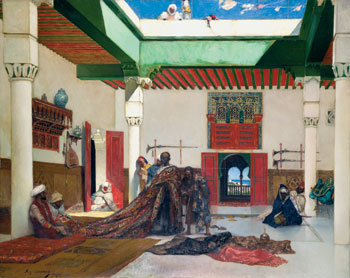
Marchand de tapis à Tanger (1883)
Private collection

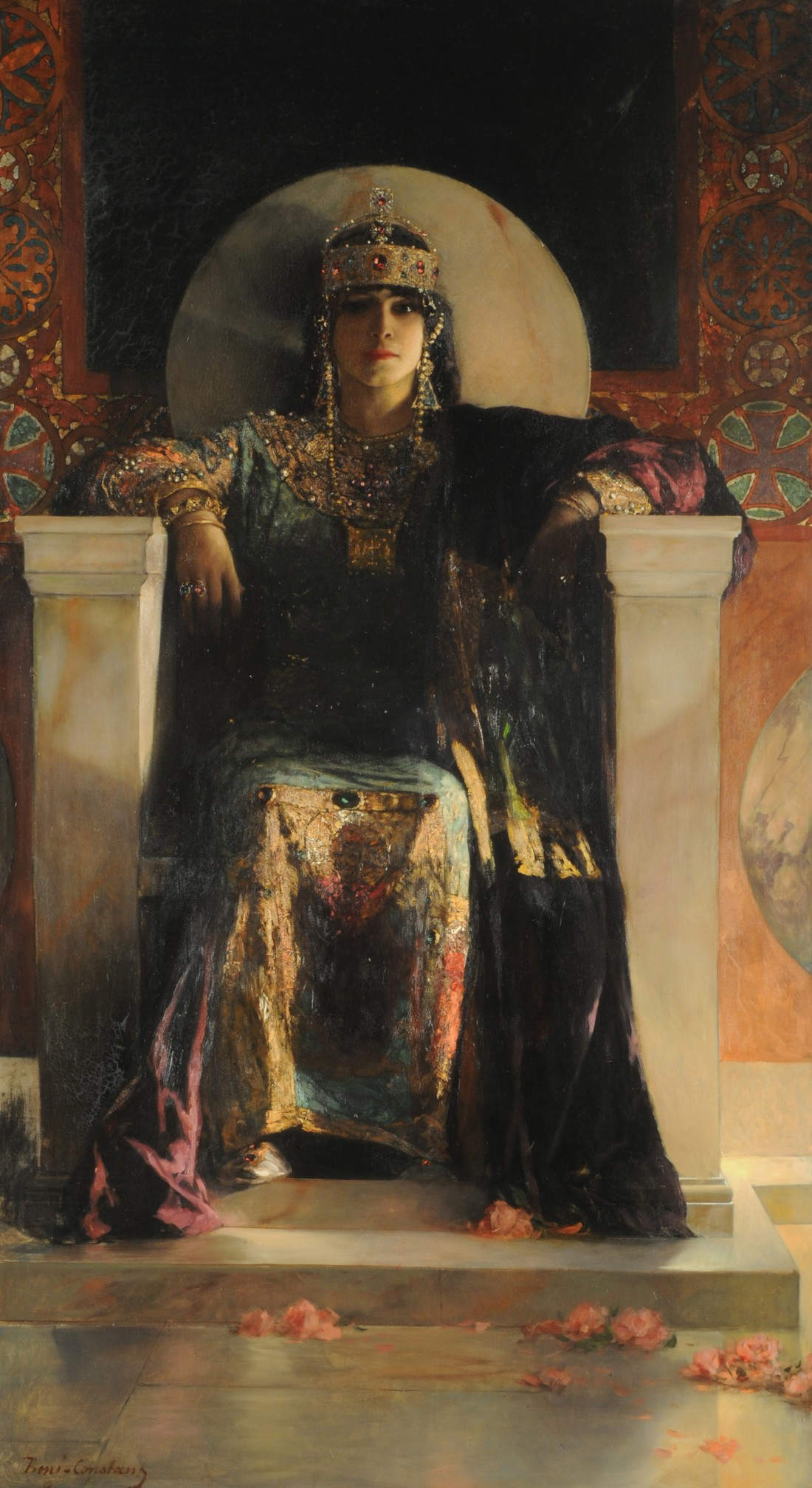
Théodora (1887)
Museo Nacional de Bellas Artes

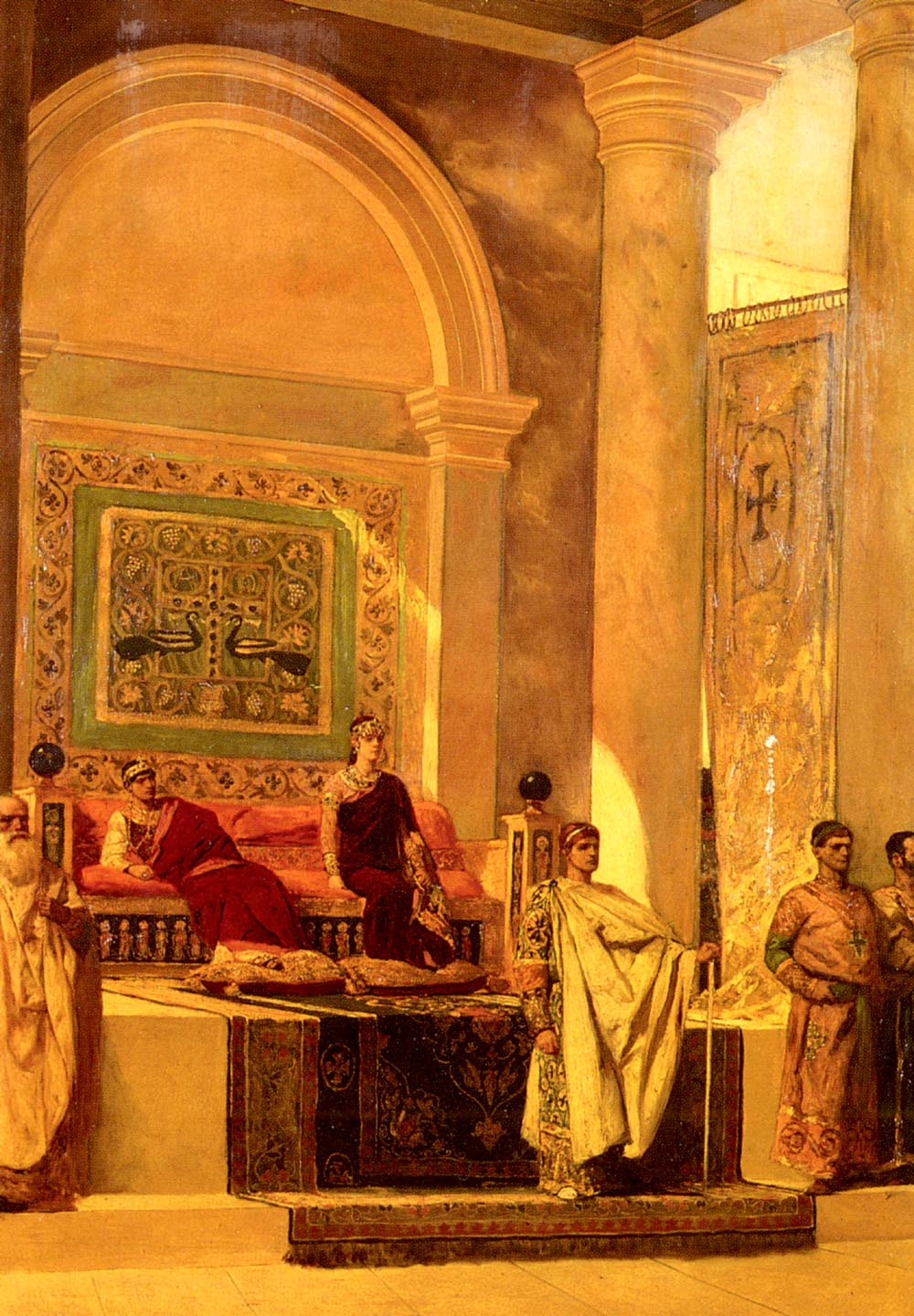
The Throne Room In Byzantium
Private collection

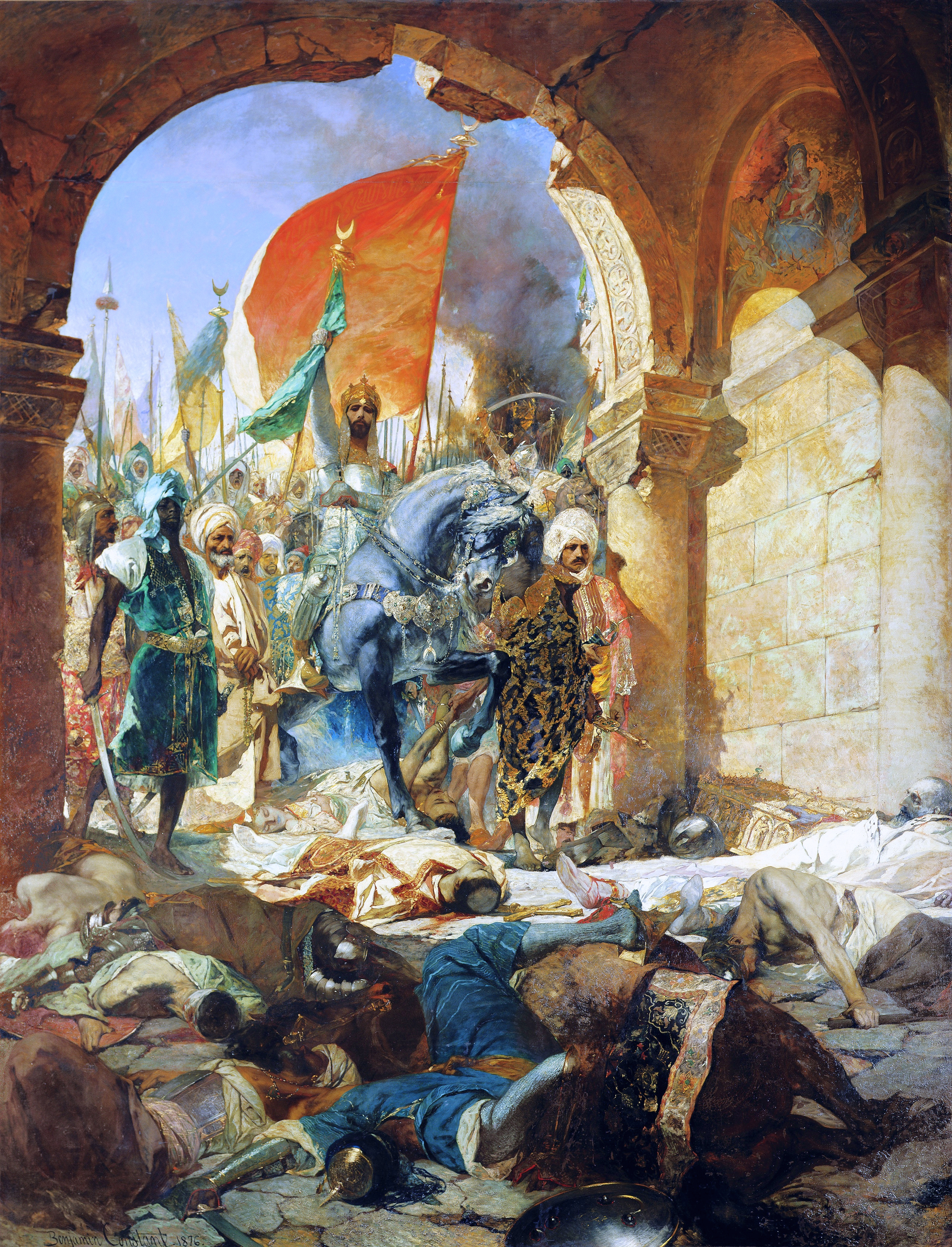
Entrée de Mehmed II dans Constantinople (1876)
Musée des Augustins, Toulouse

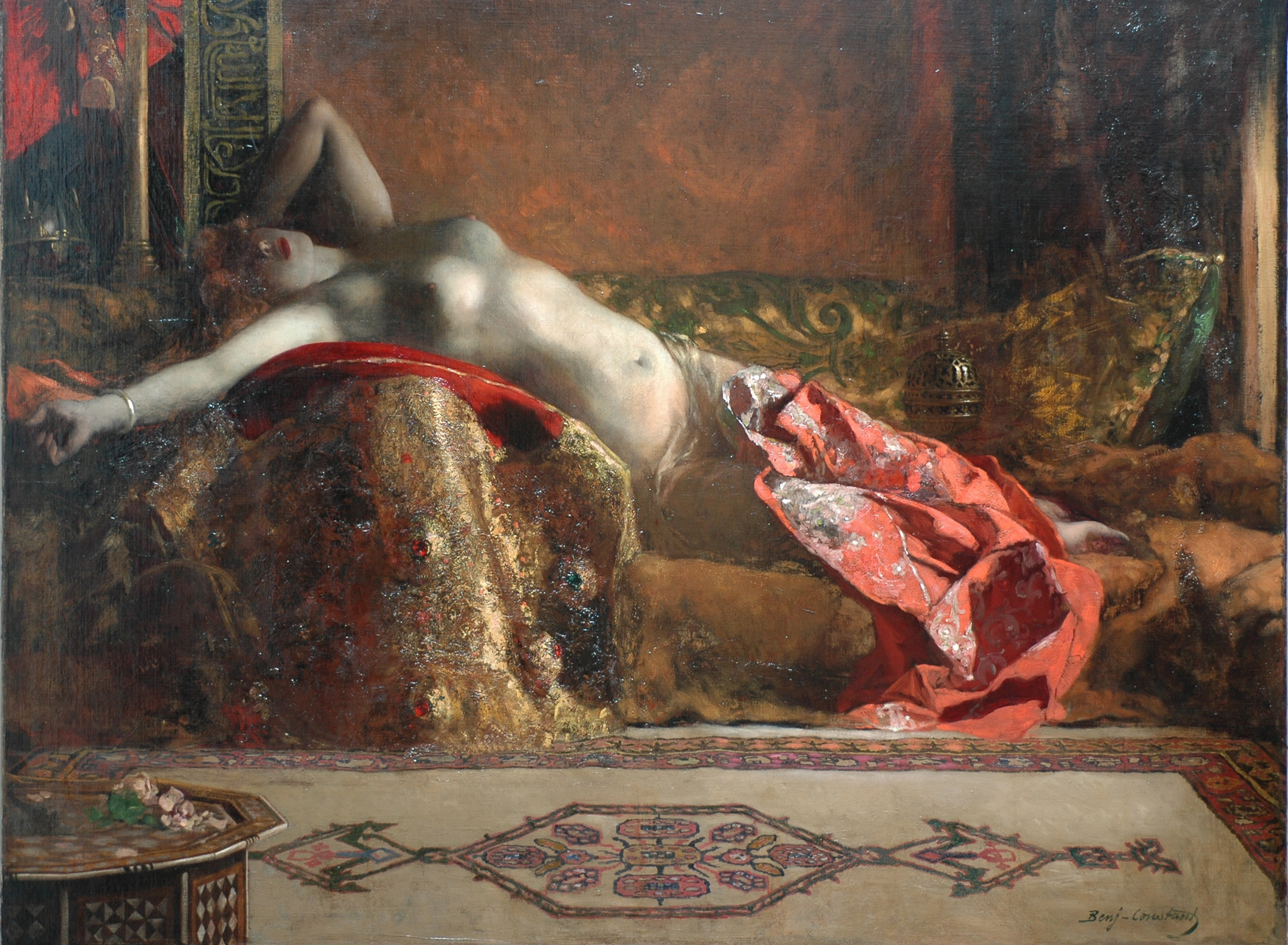
Reclining Odalisque
Musée d'Orsay Salle de Orientalist

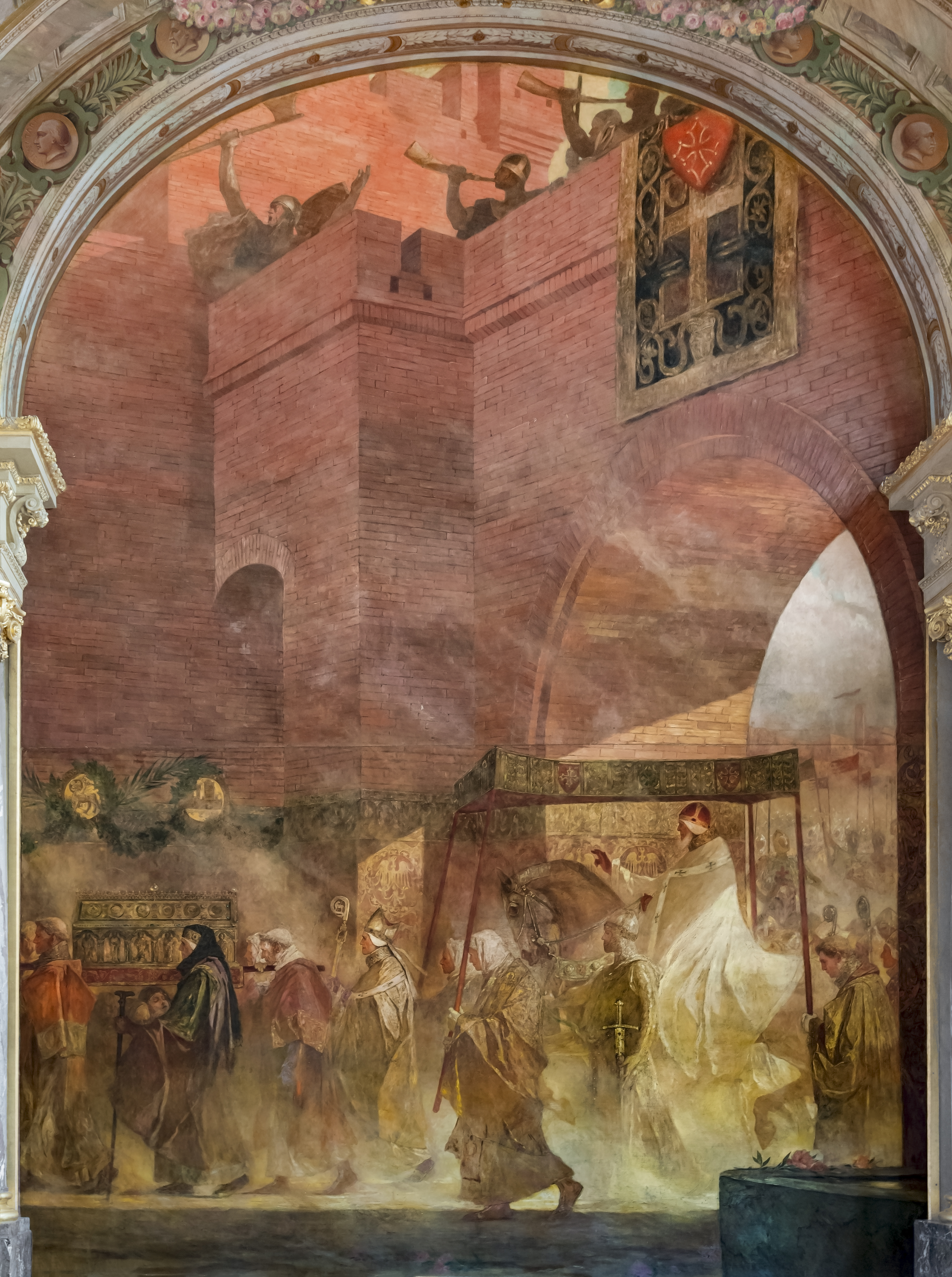
Entrée du Pape Urbain à Toulouse
Capitole de Toulouse

== See also ==
- The Day of the Funeral - Scene from Morocco
- List of Orientalist artists
- Orientalism
- Société des Peintres Orientalistes Français

== Publications ==
- Stranahan, Clara Harrison (1879). A History of French Painting. New York City, New York.
- Strahan, Edward (1977). The Art Treasures of America. Vol. III. Philadelphia, Pennsylvania. p. 60.
