= Maurice Bompard =

Maurice Bompard may refer to:

- Maurice Bompard (painter) (1857–1936), French Orientalist painter
- Maurice Bompard (politician) (1854–1935), French diplomat and politician
