= Judith Cladel =

French writer, biographer and journalist

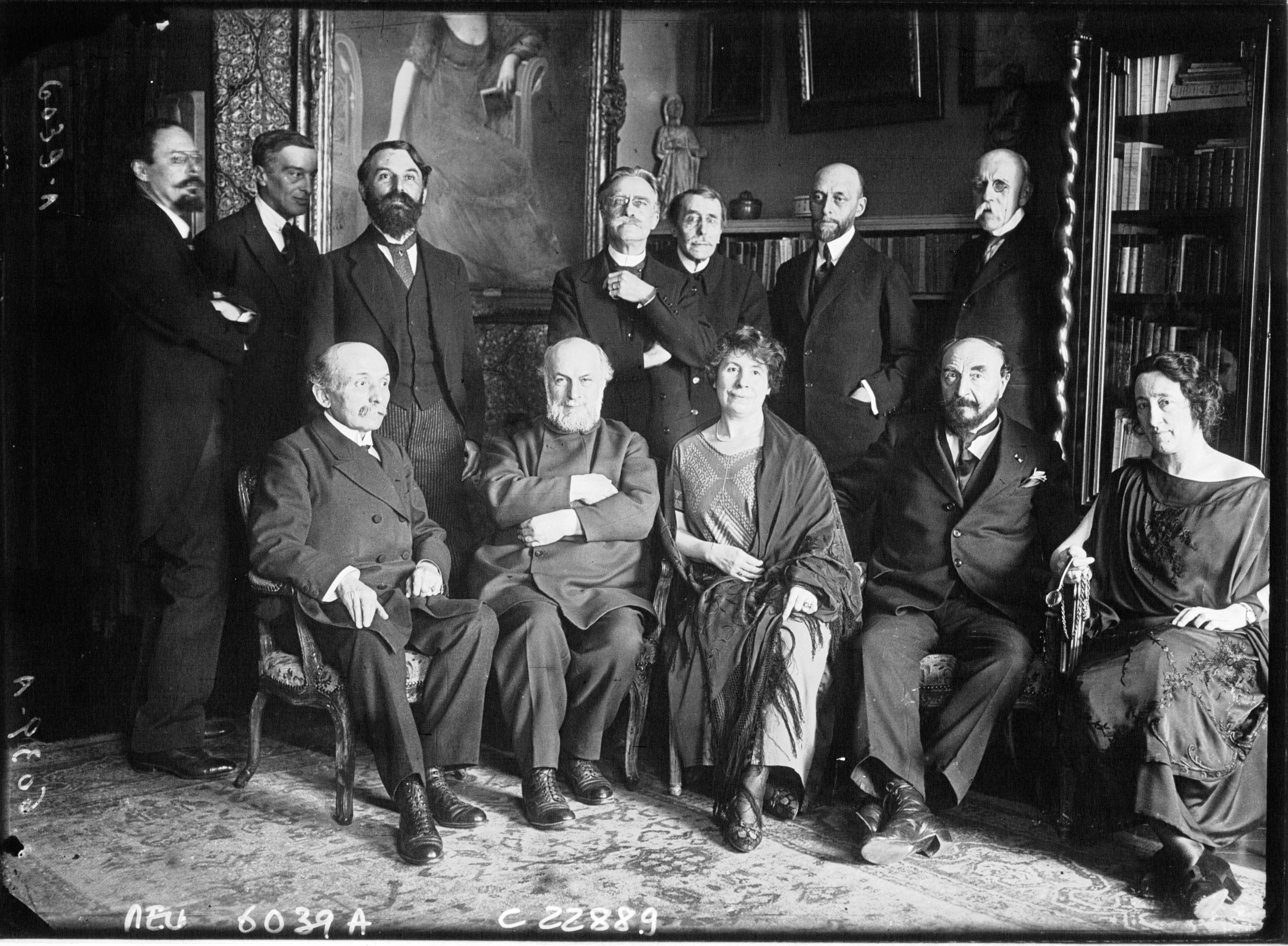
- Judith Cladel (in the first row, at the far right), member of the jury of the Grand prix Flaubert de littérature in 1923 at the home of Marcelle Tinayre (centre)
- Born: March 25, 1873; Paris, France
- Died: January 29, 1958 (aged 84); Paris, France
- Occupations: Writer; biographer; journalist

Judith Cladel (March 25, 1873 – January 29, 1958) was a French playwright, novelist, biographer and journalist.

== Life and career ==
Born and lived in Paris, she was a member of the jury of the prix Femina from 1916 to 1958. She began to write at a very young age, encouraged by her father, the novelist Léon Cladel. Her first work was the play Le Volant, performed at the Théâtre de l'Oeuvre in 1895 when she was 22 years old. Léon Cladel died when Judith was 19 years old. As her father's friend and her future lover, Edmond Picard predicted, Cladel was entrusted by her family with upkeeping his memory. Judith Cladel is the author of two biographical works about the life and work of her father. Her next biographies focused on the sculptor, Auguste Rodin. Her biography Rodin, sa vie glorieuse, sa vie inconnue is her best known work and was considered the authoritative biography of the sculptor for over 50 years. She played a key role in the founding of the Musée Rodin in 1916.

== Works ==
- Le Volant: Pièce en trois actes, Paris, Alphonse Lemerre, 1895
- Les Confessions d’une amante, Paris, Mercure de France, 1905
- La Vie de Léon Cladel, Paris, Alphose Lemerre, 1905
- Auguste Rodin, l'homme et l'oeuvre, Bruxelles, Libr. Nat. d'Art et d'Histoire, 1908
- Portraits d'Hier--Maurice Rollinat, Paris, 1910
- Rodin, sa vie glorieuse, sa vie inconnue, Paris, Grasset, 1936
- Aristide Maillol: sa vie, son oeuvre, ses idées, Paris, Grasset, 1937
- Maître et discipline: Charles Baudelaires et Léon Cladel, Paris, Corrêa, 1951

== See also ==
- Léonce Bénédite
