= Société Coloniale des Artistes Français =

La Société Coloniale des Artistes Français (founded 1908) renamed Société des Beaux-Arts de la France d'Outre-mer in 1946, and closed in 1970, was a French artistic society, and rival to the Société des Peintres Orientalistes Français. The society received the patronage of the French Ministry of Education. The impetus for the society commenced with the Colonial Exhibition of Marseilles in 1906, and the exhibition "L'Algérie, la Tunisie et les Indes" of 1907 at the Bernheim-Jeune, and at the initiative of Louis Dumoulin a new society was established. The heyday of the society was 1930 to 1935 when its artists competed for bursaries such as the Prix de Guadeloupe and Prix de l'Indochine.
