= Eugène Viala =

French painter (1859–1913)

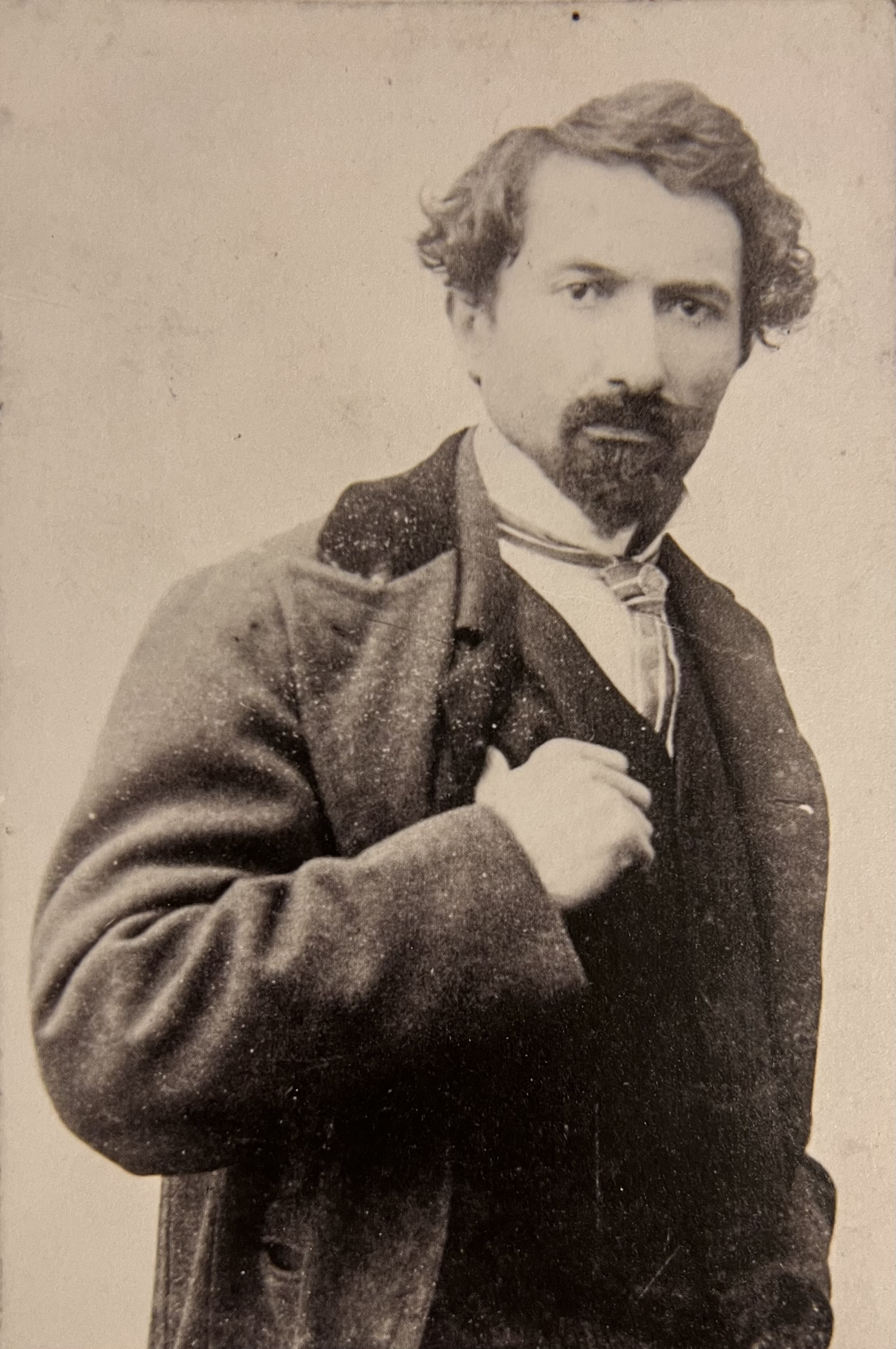
Eugène Viala

Eugène Viala (8 September 1859, Salles-Curan - 5 March 1913, Salles-Curan) was a French watercolorist and engraver.

== Biography ==
He began his studies in 1877 at the École des Beaux-Arts in Montpellier, then, in 1881, enrolled at the Académie Julian in Paris. He married Berthe Ducroët, from Saint-Geniez-d'Olt, in 1888. They had four children.

His paintings were not successful, partly on account of his physical isolation and lack of social connections, but he excelled in his engravings. Many of these were issued as postcards. His style was generally a combination of romanticism and symbolism. He had several literary friends, notably Remy de Gourmont, the Symbolist poet.

From 1908 to 1909, he edited the bi-monthly Le Cri de la Terre, a regional illustrated magazine, produced by Louis Loup-Forveille at his printing shop in Rodez. Thirteen issues were published altogether.

He was also a writer, although his work in that area is less known. His publications include Paysages (Landscapes), a collection of prose poems, Loin des foules (Far from the crowds), poems in verse, and a novel, La traversée du Rouergue (Crossing Rouergue). For a short time, he worked as a photographer in Rodez. In 1912, he established a studio in Neuilly-sur-Seine, with the help of his patron, the industrialist and art collector Maurice Fenaille.

In 1913, while in Paris, he was severely injured in a traffic accident, as he was getting off a tram. He died of his injuries, shortly after being taken back to Salles-Curan.

A school, a street, and a square are named after him there. Since 1999, the association Les Amis d'Eugène Viala et du Lévezou has been organizing exhibitions and cultural activities.

His works may be seen at the Musée Denys-Puech, Musée Paul-Dupuy, and the Fine Arts Museums of San Francisco.

== Selected works ==
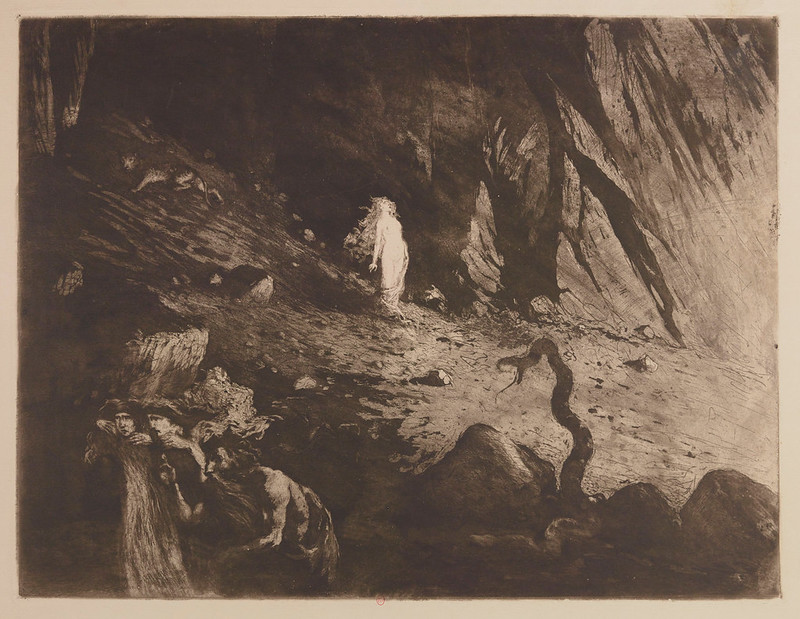
Lot's Wife

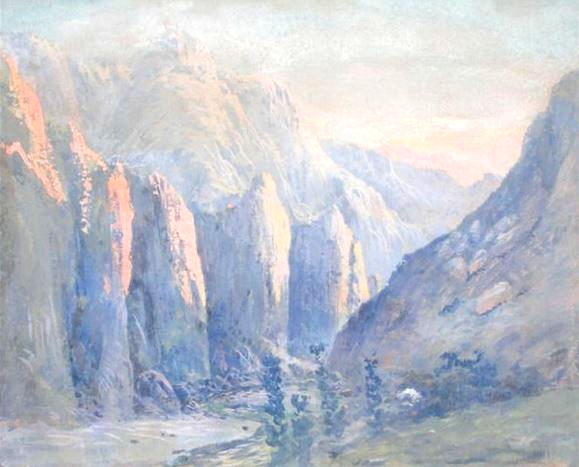
The Gorges du Tarn

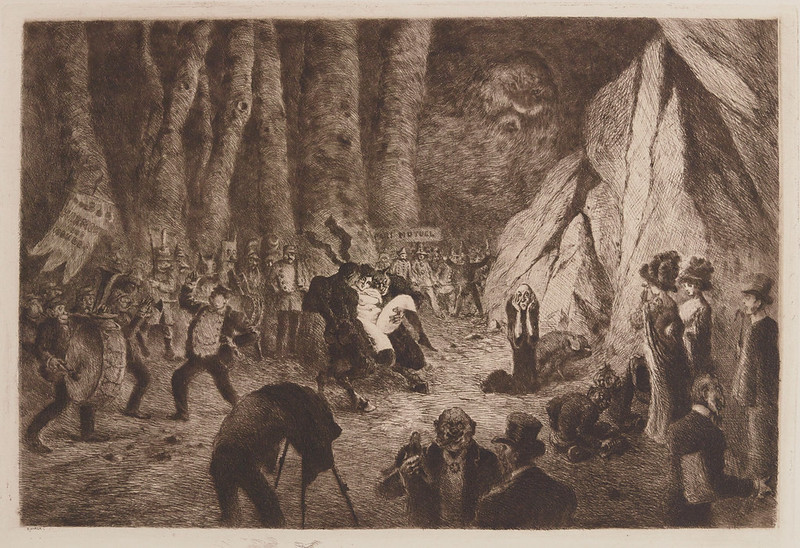
The Temptation of St. Anthony

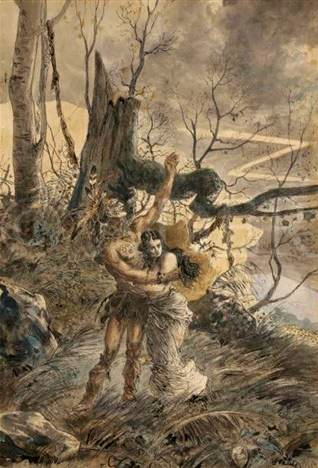
The Last of the Mohicans (magazine cover)
