= Musée Denys-Puech =

Art gallery in Rodez, France

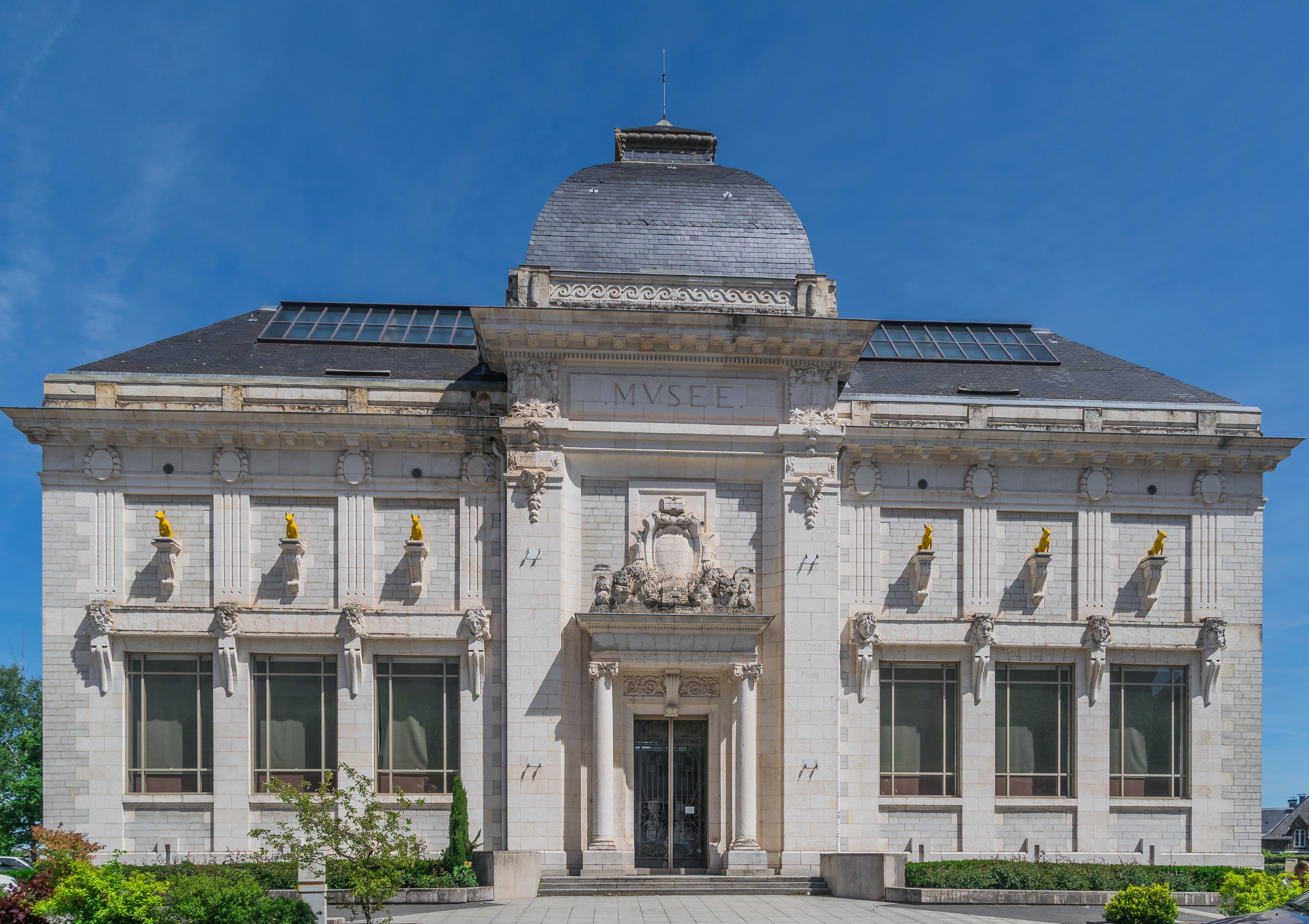
The Musée Denys-Puech

The Musée Denys-Puech is an art gallery in Rodez, France. It was founded in 1910 by the sculptor Denys Puech (1854–1942), winner of the prix de Rome in 1884 and one of the official sculptors of the French Third Republic. The building was completed in 1910 by the architect André Boyer, who designed a ground floor with large bays to enhance the sculpture collection.

== History ==
After having offered the city of Rodez a large collection of sculptures and drawings, the sculptor Denys Puech (1854–1942) convinced his friends, the orientalist painter Maurice Bompard (1857–1935) and the engraver Eugène Viala (1858–1913), to donate some of their works to build the collections of the future museum.

It was inaugurated on July 17, 1910. The building was designed by the architect André Boyer (1882–1953). A ground floor with large windows highlights the collection of sculptures.

The museum was renovated and enlarged in the 1980s, opening up to contemporary art. In 1989, François Morellet created integrations on the north and south facades. They are only visible from a precise angle of view and thus disappear into the architecture of the building as soon as the visitor moves. In 2005, the sculptor Aurèle Ricard created six bronze dogs lacquered in the yellow "International Aurèle Yellow" (IAY) as part of a public commission initiated by the museum. This series, entitled Tribute to Antonin Artaud, is installed on the consoles of the facade of the museum, left vacant since the construction of the museum.
