= Léon Cladel =

French novelist (1834–1892)

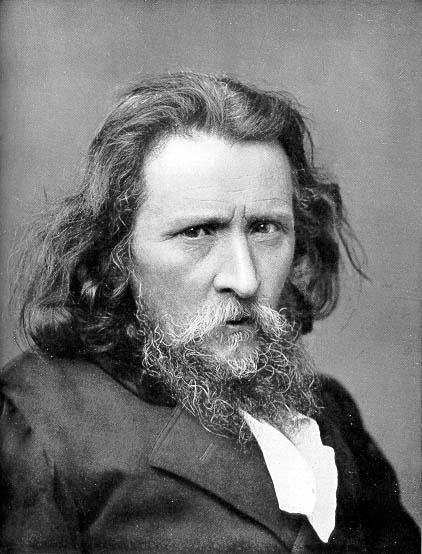
Léon Cladel

Léon Cladel (Montauban, 22 March 1834 – 21 July 1892, Sèvres) was a French novelist.

The son of an artisan, he studied law at Toulouse and became a solicitor's clerk in Paris. Cladel made a limited reputation by his first book, Les Martyrs ridicules (1862), a novel for which Charles Baudelaire, whose literary disciple Cladel was, wrote a preface. He then returned to his native district of Quercy in southwestern France, where he produced a series of stories of peasant life in Eral le dompteur (1865), Le Nomm Qouael (1868) and other volumes, similar to the works of Émile Pouvillon.

Returning to Paris he published the two novels which are generally acknowledged as his best work, Le Bouscassié (1869) and La Fête votive de Saint-Bartholomée Porte-Glaive (1872). Une Maudite (1876) was judged dangerous to public morals and cost its author a month's imprisonment. Other works by Cladel are Les Va-nu-pieds (1873), a volume of short stories; N'a-qu'un-oeil (1882), Urbains et ruraux (1884), Gueux de marque (1887), and the posthumous Juive errante (1897). He died in Sèvres on 21 July 1892.
