= Louis Dumoulin =

French painter

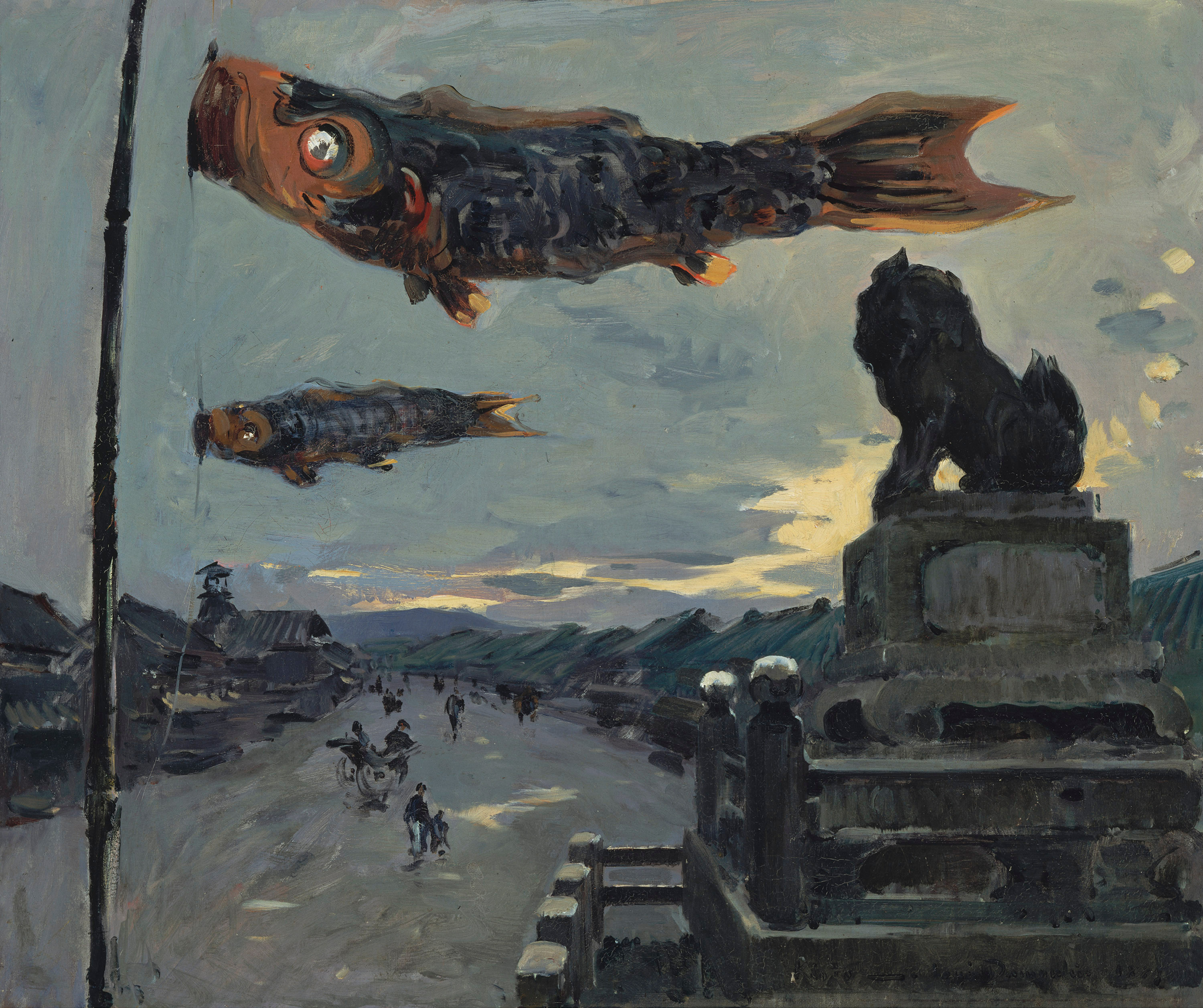
Louis-Jules Dumoulin, Carp Banners in Kyoto, signed and dated lower right: Kyoto-Louis Dumoulin 1888, oil on canvas, 46 x 54.3 cm. Museum of Fine Arts, Boston

Louis-Jules Dumoulin (Paris, 1860–1924) was a French artist and painter. He traveled in East Asia and was the founder of the Société Coloniale des Artistes Français in 1908.

Dumoulin made his first major trip outside Europe in 1888 on the occasion of an official mission to Japan ordered by the Ministry of Education. In 1908 he co-founded the Colonial Society of French Artists and was its president until his death in 1924.
