= Léonce Bénédite =

French art historian and curator (1859–1925)

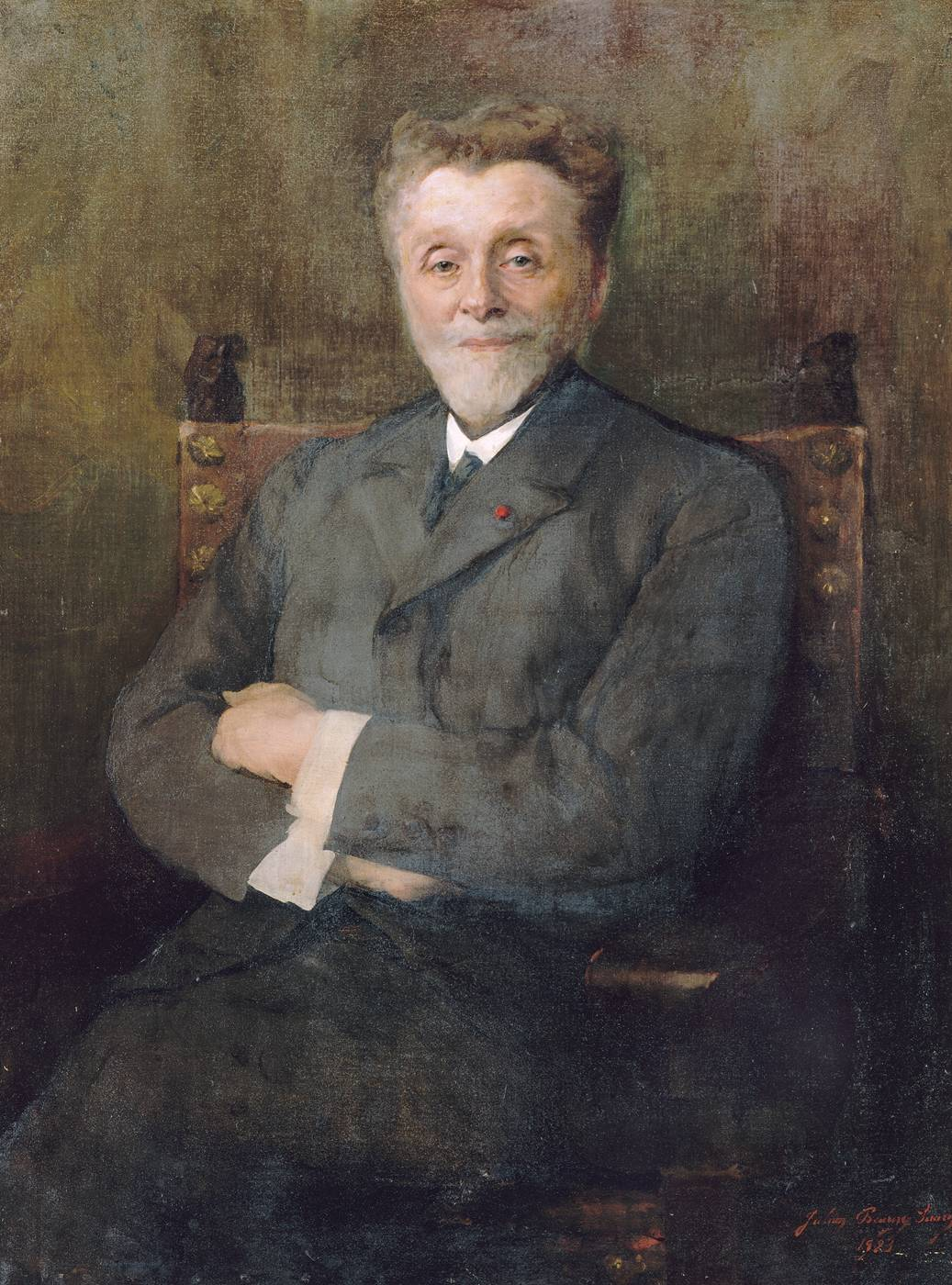
- Portrait of Léonce Bénédite by Amélie Beaury-Saurel, 1923
- Born: Léonce Bénédite; 14 January 1859; Nîmes, France
- Died: 12 May 1925 (aged 66); Paris, France
- Education: Law, art history
- Known for: Art history, curator

Léonce Bénédite (14 January 1859 – 12 May 1925) was a French art historian and curator. He was a co-founder of the Société des Peintres Orientalistes Français (Society for French Orientalist Painters) and was instrumental in establishing Orientalist art as a legitimate genre.

He was the assistant curator at the Chateau de Versailles between 1882 and 1886; the assistant curator at the Chateau de Versailles between 1886; and from 1886 he was the first assistant director at Étienne Arago at the Musée du Luxembourg until 1892 when he became the director. For Bénédite, writing was inseparable from his function as curator. He was a prolific writer, contributing to books, catalogs and art journals.

Bénédite was one of the executors of Auguste Rodin's will, with responsibility for managing Rodin's artistic heritage. He was a key figure in establishing the Rodin Museum at the Hôtel Biron in 1919 and became the museum's first curator.

== Life and career ==
Bénédite was born in Nîmes, the son of Samuel Bénédite and Isabelle Lisbonne and brother of Georges Bénédite the egyptologist. Isabelle, widowed, married the distinguished curator at the Louvre, Georges Lafenestre. This connection provided Léonce with privileged access to practising contemporary artists. He trained in law and art history. Very early on, Bénédite became involved in the artistic world as a member of the Salon des Artistes Français from 1880 to 1881. In contact with artists, he developed a network of close relationships that he maintained throughout his life, particularly through his active involvement in various art societies such as the Society of French Orientalist Painters, the Society of French Engraving Painters, the Society of Lithographic Painters or the Society of Painters of Paris.

Between 1882 and 1886, he was the assistant curator at the Chateau de Versailles. In 1886, he became the first assistant director at Étienne Arago at the Musée du Luxembourg; an art museum primarily devoted to French painting. He was appointed director in 1892 and set about defining a conservation policy that evolved little over time and which he outlined in the catalogs of the collection. In 1919, he became the first curator of the Musée Rodin. He also managed art acquisitions for the French state for almost 30 years.

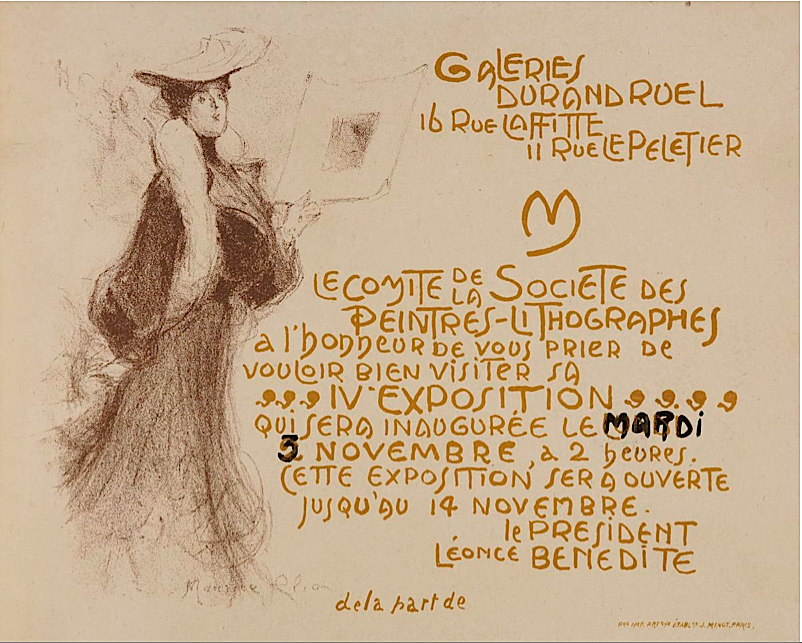
Poster for the Fourth Exhibition of the Société des peintres-lithographes, curated by Léonce Bénédite at Durand-Ruel, Paris

Bénédite established his career at Luxembourg, where he developed a conservation policy, acquisitions policy and insisted on the exhibition of all artistic techniques. He rejected hierarchies between the art forms and refused to favour painting only. Thus, the acquisition policy focussed on the development of non-existent sections or works that predecessors have not managed to organize sustainably. He did neglected neither sculpture nor lithography nor print-making and encouraged the collection of art objects, including medals. He also encouraged museums to display one representative work of all major artists in an attempt to encourage younger painters.

He founded the Société des Peintres Orientalistes Français in 1893 with Alphonse-Étienne Dinet. This society was formed on the back of the success of Bénédite's exhibition, First Retrospective and Current Exhibition of French Orientalist Painters in 1892 and was largely responsible for giving Orientalist art recognition as a distinct art movement. He became the Society's inaugural President and remained in that role until his death in 1925.

One of Bénédite's aims was to situate Orientalist art within French colonial history. To that end, he organised a number of exhibitions to display Orientalist art alongside traditional Islamic art. His writing also emphasised Orientalist art as a legitimate genre in its own right as well as its role in colonialism. Benjamin has argued that Bénédite was unusual in terms of combining art and history within a colonial frame of reference. He also founded the Abd-el-Tif prize for bursaries at the Villa Abd-el-Tif together with the then French governor of Algeria.

For Bénédite, writing was inseparable from his function as curator. He was a prolific contributor to art publications, writing in introductions to exhibition catalogs, in magazines and journals as well as publishing works of circumstance during an exhibition or following an artist's death. His subject matter was as varied as his acquisitions; he published on Burne-Jones, Bonvin, Braquemond, Carrière, Courbet, Chassériau, Falguière, Fantin-Latour, Legros, Liebermann, Rodin and Whistler. He popularised analyses of nineteenth-century art in major syntheses supporting his studies on artist biographies. His works are notable in that they seek to analyse "the evolutions of artistic inspiration."

Bénédite's zest for his curatorial duties along with his privileged contact with practising artists were determining factors for the sculptor, Auguste Rodin, who appointed him as an executor charged with the task of managing and administering Rodin's artistic heritage.

Between 1916 and 1919, Bénédite became embroiled in controversy. In 1916, he was appointed conservator of the Hôtel Biron. He saw this appointment as an opportunity to implement his museographic ambitions and ordered the installation of works by the sculptor, Rodin, in an effort to combine both the Rodin Museum and the Museum of Contemporary Art on the hotel site. However, its legitimacy was challenged by Judith Cladel, Rodin's assistant and the curator's rival, who took advantage of a case on fake Rodin and used it to discredit Léonce Bénédite. The lawsuits surrounding this affair tarnished the reputation of the curator. Benedite, nevertheless, concentrated his interest on the requirements of this museum of a new type, founded at the initiative of an artist whose will he was obliged to respect. As had become his practice in Luxembourg, he reported on his work as a curator through the publication of a catalog in which he describes the museum's facilities, the Musée Rodin: Summary Catalog of Auguste Rodin's Works and Other Works of Art of the Rodin Donation on Display at Hotel Biron, (1919).

Bénédite was the first art historian to explicitly acknowledge the similarities between Manet's Olympia and Titian's Venus of Urbino.

Bénédite died in Paris in 1925, aged 69 years. His archives are maintained by the central library of the national museums of the Louvre in Paris.

== Selected publications ==
Meissonier, Laurens by Léonce Bénédite

Books

- Meissonier: biographie critique published by H. Laurens, Paris, 1910
- La peinture au XIXième siècle: d'après les chefs-d'oeuvre des maitres et les meilleurs tableaux des principaux artistes, published by E. Flammarion, Paris, 1909
- Gustave Courbet, published by J.B. Lippincott Co., London, 1913
- Histoire des Beaux-Arts 1800-1900: peinture, sculpture, architecture, médaille et glyptique, gravure, art décoratif en France et à l’étranger, Ernest Flammarion, Paris, 1909
- Albert Lebourg, Georges Petit, Paris, 1923
- Rodin published by John Lane, London, 1926
- Théodore Chassériau; sa vie et son oeuvre, published by Les Éditions Braun, Paris, 1931

Articles

- "Michel-Barthélémy Ollivier," Gazette des Beaux-Arts, 1895, déc., pp 453–470.
- "La Collection Caillebotte au musée du Luxembourg," Gazette des Beaux-Arts, 1897, mars, pp 249–258.
- "Les Salons de 1898," Gazette des Beaux-Arts, 1898, mai, pp 353–365; juin, pp 441–462 ; juillet, pp 55–76 and août, pp 129–148.
- "Théodore Chassériau et la Décoration de la Cour des Comptes," Art et Décoration, janvier-juin 1898, III, p. 22-25.
- "Décoration de l’Hôtel de Ville," Art et Décoration, janvier-juin 1898, III, pp 54–60.
- "Les Peintres orientalistes français," Gazette des Beaux-Arts, 1899, mars, pp 239–247.
- "Deux idéalistes: Gustave Moreau et E. Burne-Jones," Revue de l’art ancien et moderne, 1899, V, pp 265–290, pp 357–378, 1899 and VI, pp 57–70.
- "Jean-Charles Cazin," Revue de l’art ancien et moderne, 1901, X, pp 1–33 and pp 73–105.
- "Félix Buhot," Revue de l’art ancien et moderne, 1902, XI, pp 1–15.
- "Artistes contemporains: Alexandre Falguière," Revue de l’art ancien et moderne, 1902, XI, pp 65–87.
- "Figures d’Extrême-Orient (Œuvres de M. Perret), Art et Décoration, janvier-juin 1902, XI, pp 69-74.
- "John Lewis Brown," Revue de l’art ancien et moderne, 1903, XIII, pp 81–94.
- "Les Peintres-lithographes," Revue de l’art ancien et moderne, 1903, XIV, pp 491–505.
- "Art et Orient: L’œuvre d’Étienne Dinet," Art et Décoration, juillet-décembre 1903, XIV, pp 305–315.
- "Charles Cottet," Art et Décoration, janvier-juin 1904, XV, pp 101–116.
- "Au musée du Luxembourg: une exposition de quelques chefs-d’œuvre prêtés par des amateurs," Revue de l’art ancien et moderne, 1904, XV, pp 263–272.
- "Artistes contemporains: Whistler," Gazette des Beaux-Arts, 1905, mai, pp 403–410 ; juin, pp 496–511 ; août, pp 142–158 and sept, pp 231–246.
- "Théodore Rivière," Art et Décoration, juillet-décembre 1905, XVIII, pp 211–212.
- "Artistes contemporains: J.-J. Henner," Gazette des Beaux-Arts, 1906, janvier, pp 39–48, novembre, pp 393–406 ; 1907, octobre, pp 315–332 et novembre, pp 408–423; 1908, janvier, pp 35–58, mars, pp 237–264 and août, pp 137–166.
- "Lucien Simon," Art et Décoration, janvier-juin 1906, XIX, pp 24–37.
- "Un portrait de Dalou et de sa famille, par Sir Lawrence Alma-Tadema (musée du Luxembourg)," Musées et monuments de France, 1907, n° 9, pp 129–131.
- "Madame Marie Gautier," Art et Décoration, janvier-juin 1908, XXIII, pp 136–144.
- "Un bâtisseur belge: Georges Hobé," Art et Décoration, janvier-juin 1908, XXIII, pp 89–98.
- "Charles Meryon," Gazette des Beaux-Arts, 1910, février, pp 139–144.
- "La Collection Chauchard au musée du Louvre. (Les peintres de l’École dite de 1830)," Gazette des Beaux-Arts, 1911, février, pp 89–112.
- "L’École américaine au musée du Luxembourg," Revue de l’art ancien et moderne, 1914, XXXVI, pp 193–210.
- "Harpignies: 1819-1916," Gazette des Beaux-Arts, 1917, avril-juin, pp 207–235.
- "Auguste Rodin (1840-1917)," Gazette des Beaux-Arts, 1918, janvier-mars, pp 5–34.
- "Une exposition d’Ingres," Gazette des Beaux-Arts, 1921, juin, pp 325–337.
- "L’Exposition Baudry et Saint-Marceaux à l’École des Beaux-Arts," Gazette des Beaux-Arts, 1922, juin, pp 332–338.

== See also ==
- Société des Peintres Orientalistes Français
- (fr:Georges Lafenestre)
