= Maurice Bompard (painter) =

French painter (1857–1936)

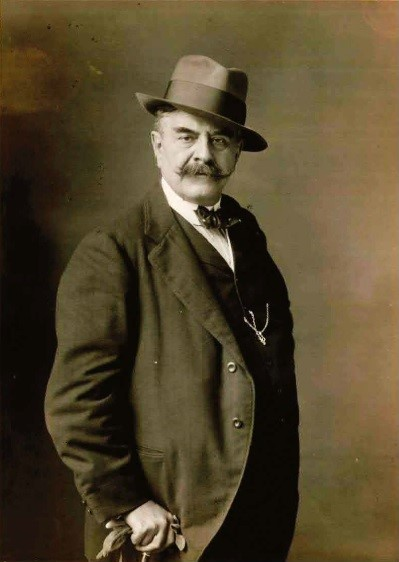
Maurice Bompard (Bompard archives, Denys-Puech museum, Rodez)

Jean Maurice Bompard (11 February 1857 – 1936) was a French Orientalist painter; one of the founders of the Société des Peintres Orientalistes Français.

== Biography ==
He was born in Rodez. At a very young age, in 1865, his family moved to Marseille, where he later studied painting with Dominique Antoine Magaud. He then went to Paris, where he was a student of the Orientalist Gustave Boulanger and the history painter Jules Lefebvre, at the École Nationale Supérieure des Beaux-Arts. His first exhibit was in 1878. Four years later, he obtained a grant that enabled him to visit Germany, Italy, Spain and Tunisia.

Not long after returning, in 1889, he married Amélie Perretti, and they immediately set off for a three-month stay in Biskra. He would go there every winter for the next few years, until 1893, when the local people became suspicious of his activities. After that, until 1908, he wintered in Venice. In his later years, he was a free-lance artist in Paris.

Bompard's Orientalist works depicted scenes from daily life; notably The Butchers of Chetma, which was presented at the Salon in 1890. He also created numerous views of Venice during his stays there.

His works may be seen at the Musée Denys-Puech, the Musée d'Orsay and the Musée des Beaux-Arts de Marseille. The common areas of the Grand Hôtel Broussy in Rodez (lounge and dining room) feature his decorative murals.

Bompard died in Paris in 1936.

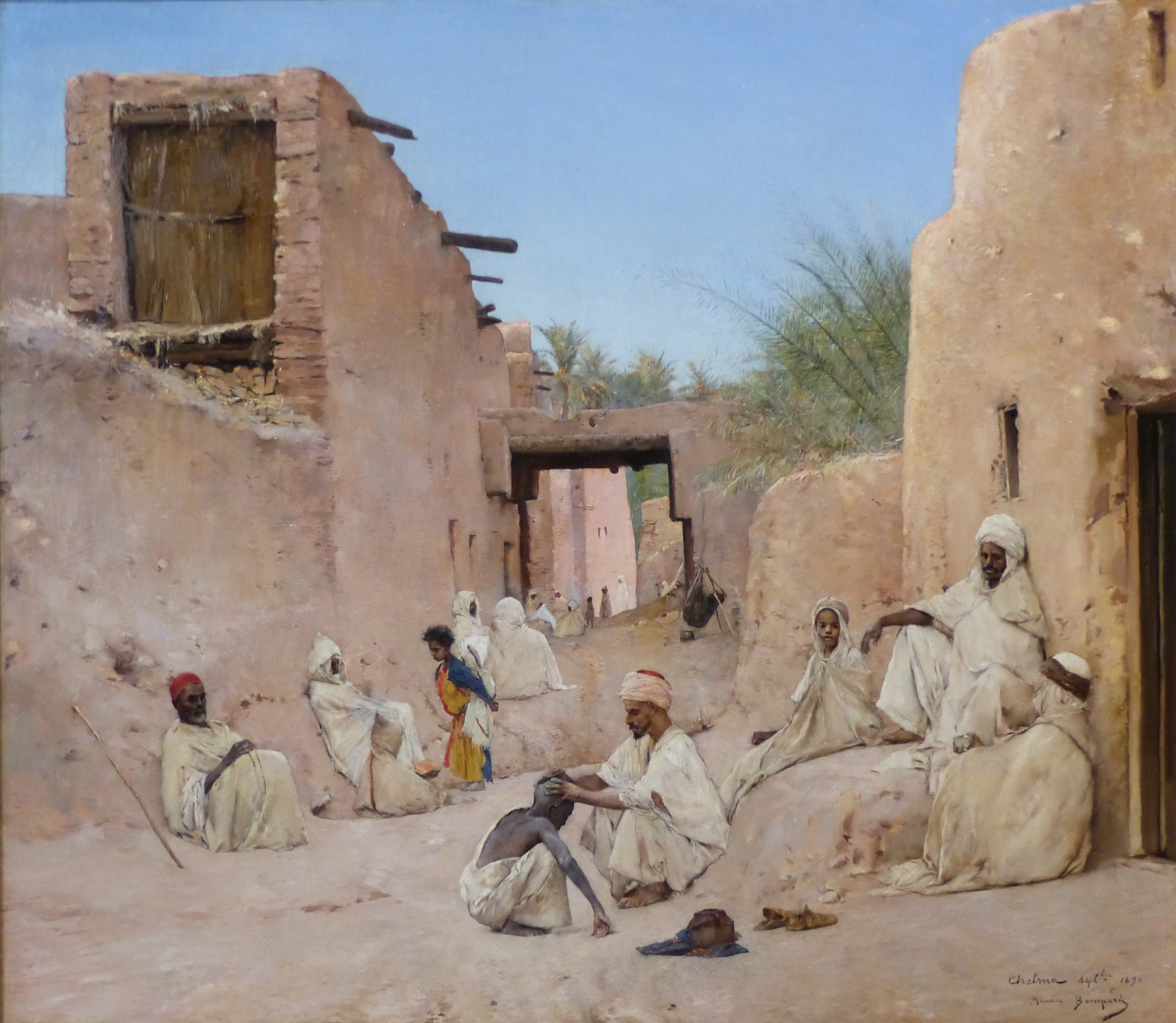
Chetma Oasis, Biskra Province

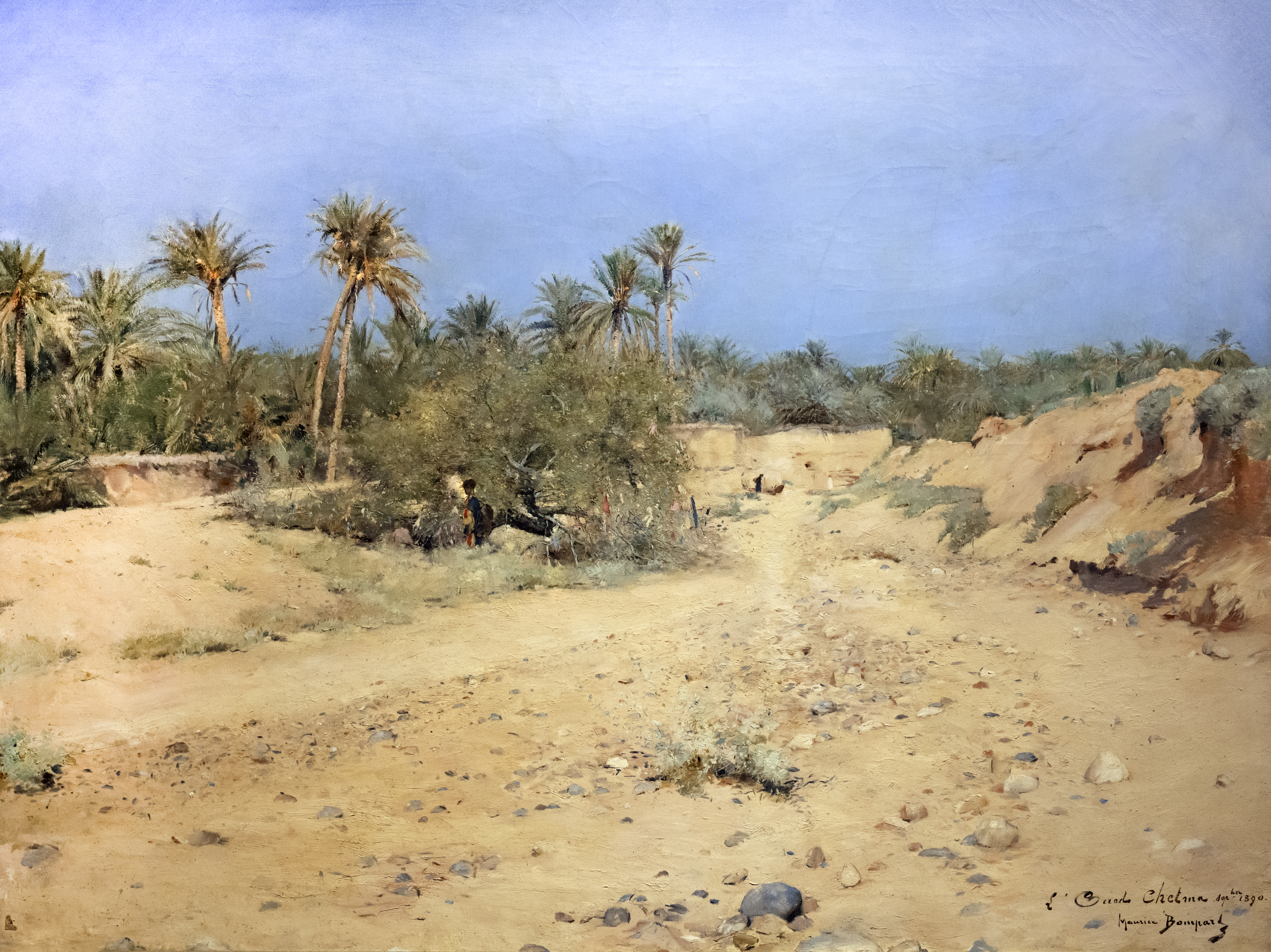
Oued Chetma (Algeria) in summer, 189
