= Romanticism in Scotland =

Artistic, literary and intellectual movement

Romanticism in Scotland was an artistic, literary and intellectual movement that developed between the late eighteenth and the early nineteenth centuries. It was part of the wider European Romantic movement, which was partly a reaction against the Age of Enlightenment, emphasising individual, national and emotional responses, moving beyond Renaissance and Classicist models, particularly into nostalgia for the Middle Ages. The concept of a separate national Scottish Romanticism was first articulated by the critics Ian Duncan and Murray Pittock in the Scottish Romanticism in World Literatures Conference held at UC Berkeley in 2006 and in the latter's Scottish and Irish Romanticism (2008), which argued for a national Romanticism based on the concepts of a distinct national public sphere and differentiated inflection of literary genres; the use of Scots language; the creation of a heroic national history through an Ossianic or Scottian 'taxonomy of glory' and the performance of a distinct national self in diaspora.

In the arts, Romanticism manifested itself in literature and drama in the adoption of the mythical bard Ossian, the exploration of national poetry in the work of Robert Burns and in the historical novels of Walter Scott. Scott also had a major impact on the development of a national Scottish drama. Art was heavily influenced by Ossian and a new view of the Highlands as the location of a wild and dramatic landscape. Scott profoundly affected architecture through his re-building of Abbotsford House in the early nineteenth century, which set off the boom in the Scots Baronial revival. In music, Burns was part of an attempt to produce a canon of Scottish song, which resulted in a cross fertilisation of Scottish and continental classical music, with romantic music becoming dominant in Scotland into the twentieth century.

Intellectually, Scott and figures like Thomas Carlyle played a part in the development of historiography and the idea of the historical imagination. Romanticism also influenced science, particularly the life sciences, geology, optics and astronomy, giving Scotland a prominence in these areas that continued into the late nineteenth century. Scottish philosophy was dominated by Scottish Common Sense Realism, which shared some characteristics with Romanticism and was a major influence on the development of Transcendentalism. Scott also played a major part in defining Scottish and British politics, helping to create a romanticised view of Scotland and the Highlands that fundamentally changed Scottish national identity.

Romanticism began to subside as a movement in the 1830s, but it continued to significantly affect areas such as music until the early twentieth century. It also had a lasting impact on the nature of Scottish identity and outside perceptions of Scotland.

== Definitions ==
Romanticism was a complex artistic, literary and intellectual movement that originated in the second half of the eighteenth century in western Europe, and gained strength during and after the Industrial and French Revolutions. It was partly a revolt against the political norms of the Age of Enlightenment which rationalised nature, and was embodied most strongly in the visual arts, music, and literature, but significantly influenced historiography, philosophy and the natural sciences. However in Scotland it has been argued that Romanticism displayed a degree of continuity with some of the key themes of Enlightenment thought.

Romanticism has been seen as "the revival of the life and thought of the Middle Ages", reaching beyond Rationalist and Classicist models to elevate medievalism and elements of art and narrative perceived to be authentically medieval, in an attempt to escape the confines of population growth, urban sprawl and industrialism, embracing the exotic, unfamiliar and distant. It is also associated with political revolutions, beginning with those in Americana and France and movements for independence, particularly in Poland, Spain and Greece. It is often thought to incorporate an emotional assertion of the self and of individual experience along with a sense of the infinite, transcendental and sublime. In art there was a stress on imagination, landscape and a spiritual correspondence with nature. It has been described by Margaret Drabble as "an unending revolt against classical form, conservative morality, authoritarian government, personal insincerity, and human moderation".

== Literature and drama ==
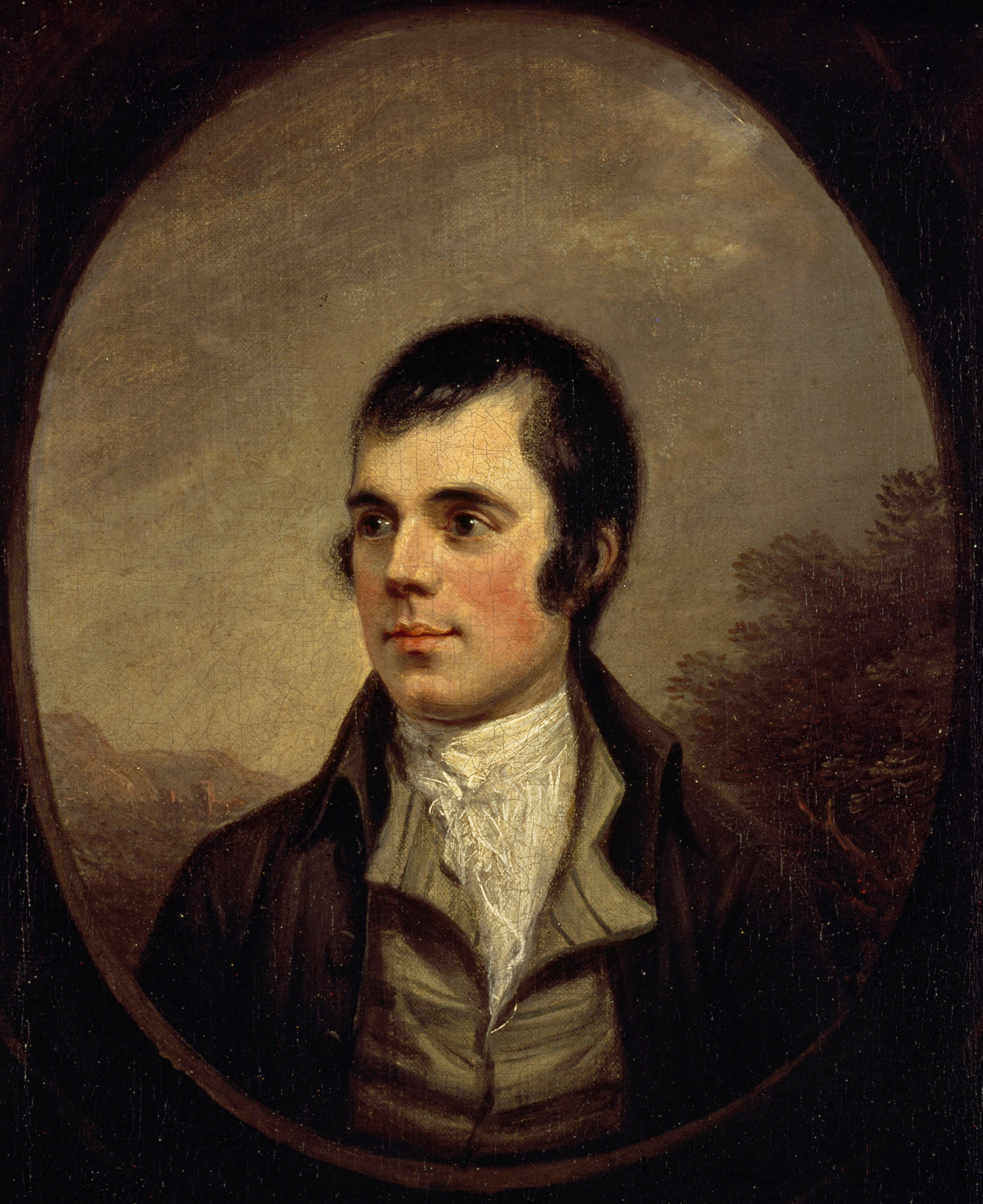
Robert Burns in Alexander Nasmyth's portrait of 1787

Although after union with England in 1707 Scotland increasingly adopted English language and wider cultural norms, its literature developed a distinct national identity and began to enjoy an international reputation. Allan Ramsay (1684–1758) laid the foundations of a reawakening of interest in older Scottish literature, as well as leading the trend for pastoral poetry, helping to develop the Habbie stanza as a poetic form. James Macpherson (1736–96) was the first Scottish poet to gain an international reputation. Claiming to have found poetry written by the ancient bard Ossian, he published translations that acquired international popularity, being proclaimed as a Celtic equivalent of the Classical epics. Fingal, written in 1762, was speedily translated into many European languages, and its appreciation of natural beauty and treatment of the ancient legend has been credited more than any single work with bringing about the Romantic movement in European, and especially in German literature, through its influence on Johann Gottfried von Herder and Johann Wolfgang von Goethe. It was also popularised in France by figures that included Napoleon. Eventually it became clear that the poems were not direct translations from the Gaelic, but flowery adaptations made to suit the aesthetic expectations of his audience.

Robert Burns (1759–96) and Walter Scott (1771–1832) were highly influenced by the Ossian cycle. Burns, an Ayrshire poet and lyricist, is widely regarded as the national poet of Scotland and a major influence on the Romantic movement. His poem (and song) "Auld Lang Syne" is often sung at Hogmanay (the last day of the year), and "Scots Wha Hae" served for a long time as an unofficial national anthem of the country. Scott began as a poet and also collected and published Scottish ballads. His first prose work, Waverley in 1814, is often called the first historical novel. It launched a highly successful career, with other historical novels such as Rob Roy (1817), The Heart of Midlothian (1818) and Ivanhoe (1820). Scott probably did more than any other figure to define and popularise Scottish cultural identity in the nineteenth century. Other major literary figures connected with Romanticism include the poets and novelists James Hogg (1770–1835), Allan Cunningham (1784–1842) and John Galt (1779–1839).

Scotland was also the location of two of the most important literary magazines of the era, The Edinburgh Review (founded in 1802) and Blackwood's Magazine (founded in 1817), which significantly influenced the development of British literature and drama in the era of Romanticism. Ian Duncan and Alex Benchimol suggest that publications like the novels of Scott and these magazines were part of a highly dynamic Scottish Romanticism that by the early nineteenth century, caused Edinburgh to emerge as the cultural capital of Britain and become central to a wider formation of a "British Isles nationalism."

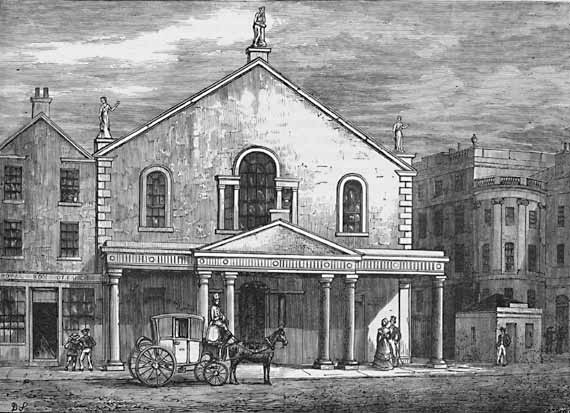
The Theatre Royal, Edinburgh, as it was from 1769–1830

Scottish "national drama" emerged in the early 1800s, as plays with specifically Scottish themes began to dominate the Scottish stage. Theatres had been discouraged by the Church of Scotland and fears of Jacobite assemblies. In the later eighteenth century, many plays were written for and performed by small amateur companies and were not published and so most have been lost. Towards the end of the century there were "closet dramas", primarily designed to be read, rather than performed, including work by Scott, Hogg, Galt and Joanna Baillie (1762–1851), often influenced by the ballad tradition and Gothic Romanticism.

The Scottish national drama that emerged in the early nineteenth century was largely historical in nature and based around a core of adaptations of Scott's Waverley novels. The existing repertoire of Scottish-themed plays included Shakespeare's Macbeth (c. 1605), Friedrich Schiller's Maria Stuart (1800), John Home's Douglas (1756) and Ramsay's The Gentle Shepherd (1725), with the last two being the most popular plays among amateur groups. Ballets with Scottish themes included Jockey and Jenny and Love in the Highlands. Scott was keenly interested in drama, becoming a shareholder in the Theatre Royal, Edinburgh. Baillie's Highland themed The Family Legend was first produced in Edinburgh in 1810 with the help of Scott, as part of a deliberate attempt to stimulate a national Scottish drama. Scott also wrote five plays, of which Hallidon Hill (1822) and MacDuff's Cross (1822) were patriotic Scottish histories. Adaptations of the Waverley novels, first performed primarily in minor theatres, rather than the larger Patent theatres, included The Lady in the Lake (1817), The Heart of Midlothian (1819) (specifically described as a "romantic play" for its first performance), and Rob Roy, which underwent over 1,000 performances in Scotland in this period. Also adapted for the stage were Guy Mannering, The Bride of Lammermoor and The Abbot. These highly popular plays saw the social range and size of the audience for theatre expand and helped shape theatre-going practices in Scotland for the rest of the century.

== Art ==
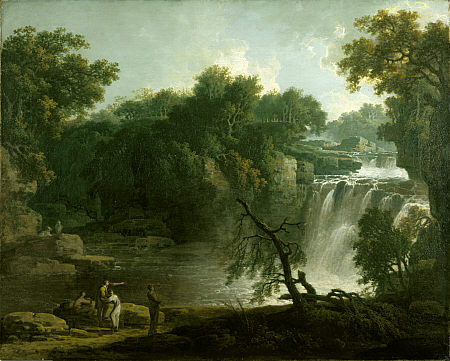
Jacob More's The Falls of Clyde: Corra Linn, c. 1771

The Ossian cycle itself became a common subject for Scottish artists, and works based on its themes were created by figures such as Alexander Runciman (1736–85) and David Allan (1744–96). This period saw a shift in attitudes to the Highlands and mountain landscapes in general, from viewing them as hostile, empty regions occupied by backward and marginal people, to interpreting them as aesthetically pleasing exemplars of nature, occupied by rugged primitives, who were now depicted in a dramatic fashion. Produced before his departure to Italy, Jacob More's (1740–93) series of four paintings "Falls of Clyde" (1771–73) have been described by art historian Duncan Macmillan as treating the waterfalls as "a kind of natural national monument" and has been seen as an early work in developing a romantic sensibility to the Scottish landscape. Runciman was probably the first artist to paint Scottish landscapes in watercolours in the more romantic style that was emerging towards the end of the eighteenth century.

The effect of Romanticism can also be seen in the works of late eighteenth- and early nineteenth-century artists such as Henry Raeburn (1756–1823), Alexander Nasmyth (1758–1840) and John Knox (1778–1845). Raeburn was the most significant artist of the period to pursue his entire career in Scotland. He was born in Edinburgh and returned there after a trip to Italy in 1786. He is most famous for his intimate portraits of leading figures in Scottish life, going beyond the aristocracy to lawyers, doctors, professors, writers and ministers, adding elements of Romanticism to the tradition of Reynolds. He became a knight in 1822 and the King's limner and painter for Scotland in 1823. Nasmyth visited Italy and worked in London, but returned to his native Edinburgh for most of his career. He produced work in a range of forms, including his portrait of Romantic poet Robert Burns, which depicts him against a dramatic Scottish background, but he is chiefly remembered for his landscapes and has been seen as "the founder of the Scottish landscape tradition". The work of Knox continued the theme of landscape, directly linking it with the Romantic works of Scott, and he was also among the first artists to depict the urban landscape of Glasgow.

== Architecture ==
The Gothic revival in architecture has been seen as an expression of Romanticism, and according to Alvin Jackson, the Scots baronial style was "a Caledonian reading of the gothic". Some of the earliest evidence of a revival in Gothic architecture are from Scotland. Inveraray Castle, constructed from 1746 with design input from William Adam, incorporates turrets into a conventional Palladian-style house. His son Robert Adam's houses in this style include Mellerstain and Wedderburn in Berwickshire and Seton House in East Lothian. The trend is most clearly seen at Culzean Castle, Ayrshire, remodelled by Robert from 1777.

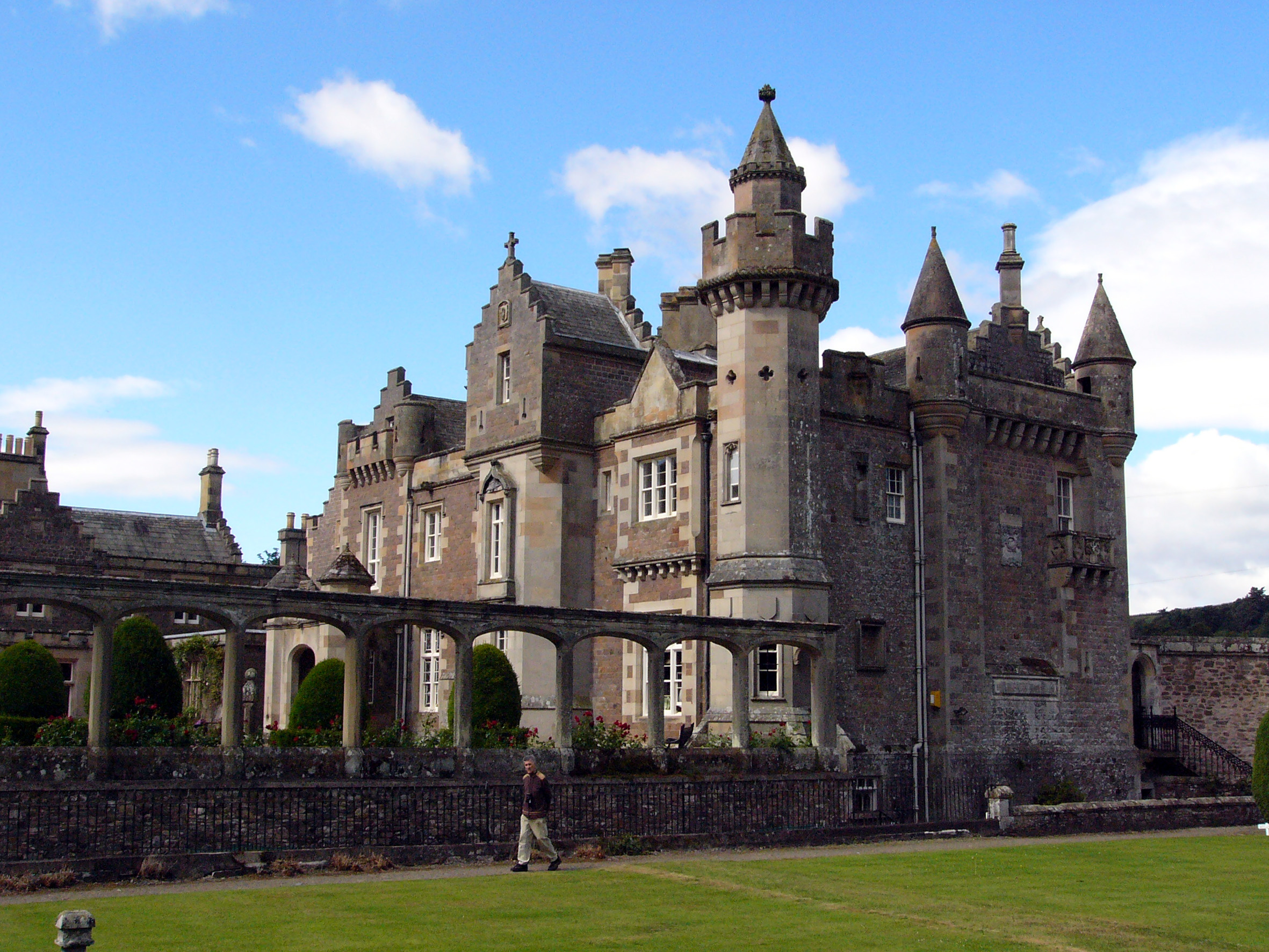
Abbotsford House, re-built for Walter Scott, helped to launch the Scots Baronial revival.

Important for the re-adoption of the Scots Baronial in the early nineteenth century was Abbotsford House, the residence of Scott. Re-built for him from 1816, it became a model for the revival of the style. Common features borrowed from sixteenth- and seventeenth-century houses included battlemented gateways, crow-stepped gables, pointed turrets and machicolations. The style was popular across Scotland and was applied to many relatively modest dwellings by architects such as William Burn (1789–1870), David Bryce (1803–1876), Edward Blore (1787–1879), Edward Calvert (c. 1847–1914) and Robert Stodart Lorimer (1864–1929). Examples in urban contexts include the building of Cockburn Street in Edinburgh (from the 1850s) as well as the National Wallace Monument at Stirling (1859–69). The rebuilding of Balmoral Castle as a baronial palace, and its adoption as a royal retreat by Queen Victoria from 1855–58, confirmed the popularity of the style.

In ecclesiastical architecture, a style similar to that developed in England was adopted. Important figures in this movement included Frederick Thomas Pilkington (1832–98), who developed a new style of church building which accorded with the fashionable High Gothic, but which adapted it for the worship needs of the Free Church of Scotland. Examples include Barclay Viewforth Church, Edinburgh (1862–64). Robert Rowand Anderson (1834–1921), who trained in the office of George Gilbert Scott in London before returning to Edinburgh, worked mainly on small churches in the "First Pointed" (or Early English) style that is characteristic of Scott's former assistants. By 1880, his practice was designing some of the most prestigious public and private buildings in Scotland, such as the Scottish National Portrait Gallery; the Dome of Old College, Medical Faculty and McEwan Hall, Edinburgh University; the Central Hotel at Glasgow Central station; the Catholic Apostolic Church in Edinburgh; and Mount Stuart House on the Isle of Bute.

== Music ==
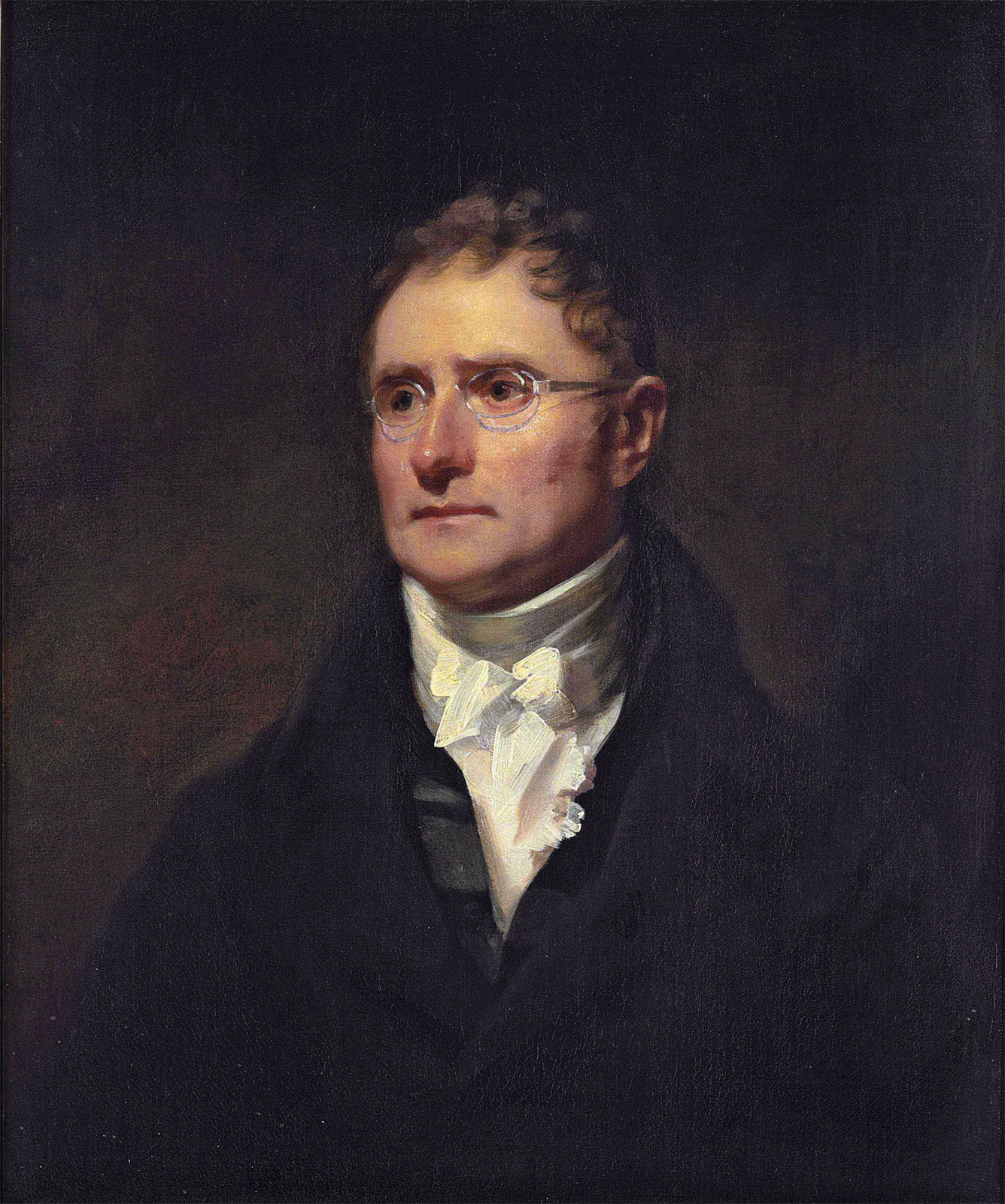
George Thomson by Henry Raeburn

One characteristic of Romanticism was the conscious creation of bodies of nationalist art music. In Scotland this form was dominant from the late eighteenth century to the early twentieth century. In the 1790s Robert Burns embarked on an attempt to produce a corpus of Scottish national song, building on the work of antiquarians and musicologists such as William Tytler, James Beattie and Joseph Ritson. Working with music engraver and seller James Johnson, he contributed about a third of the eventual songs of the collection known as the Scots Musical Museum, issued between 1787 and 1803 in six volumes. Burns collaborated with George Thomson in A Select Collection of Original Scottish Airs, published from 1793 to 1818, which adapted Scottish folk songs with "classical" arrangements. Thompson was inspired by hearing Scottish songs sung by visiting Italian castrati at the St Cecilia Concerts in Edinburgh. He collected Scottish songs and obtained musical arrangements from the best European composers, who included Joseph Haydn and Ludwig van Beethoven. Burns was employed in editing the lyrics. A Select Collection of Original Scottish Airs was published in five volumes between 1799 and 1818. It helped make Scottish songs part of the European cannon of classical music, while Thompson's work brought elements of Romanticism, such as harmonies based on those of Beethoven, into Scottish classical music. Also involved in the collection and publication of Scottish songs was Scott, whose first literary effort was Minstrelsy of the Scottish Border, published in three volumes (1802–03). This collection first drew the attention of an international audience to his work, and some of his lyrics were set to music by Schubert, who also created a setting of Ossian.

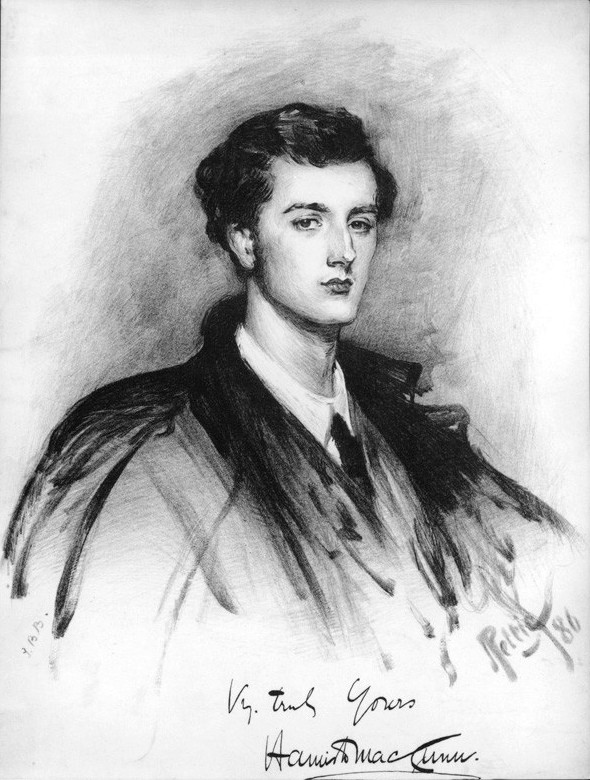
Hamish MacCunn

Perhaps the most influential composer of the first half of the nineteenth century was the German Felix Mendelssohn, who visited Britain ten times, for a total of twenty months, from 1829. Scotland inspired two of his most famous works, the overture Fingal's Cave (also known as the Hebrides Overture) and the Scottish Symphony (Symphony No. 3). On his last visit to England in 1847, he conducted his own Scottish Symphony with the Philharmonic Orchestra before Queen Victoria and Prince Albert. Max Bruch (1838–1920) composed the Scottish Fantasy (1880) for violin and orchestra, which includes an arrangement of the tune "Hey Tuttie Tatie", best known for its use in the song Scots Wha Hae by Burns.

By the late nineteenth century, there was in effect a national school of orchestral and operatic music in Scotland. Major composers included Alexander Mackenzie (1847–1935), William Wallace (1860–1940), Learmont Drysdale (1866–1909), Hamish MacCunn (1868–1916) and John McEwen (1868–1948). Mackenzie, who studied in Germany and Italy and mixed Scottish themes with German Romanticism, is best known for his three Scottish Rhapsodies (1879–80, 1911), Pibroch for violin and orchestra (1889) and the Scottish Concerto for piano (1897), all involving Scottish themes and folk melodies. Wallace's work included an overture, In Praise of Scottish Poesie (1894); his pioneering symphonic poem about his namesake, medieval nationalist William Wallace AD 1305–1905 (1905); and a cantata, The Massacre of the Macpherson (1910). Drysdale's work often dealt with Scottish themes, including the overture Tam O' Shanter (1890), the cantata The Kelpie (1891), the tone poem A Border Romance (1904), and the cantata Tamlane (1905). MacCunn's overture The Land of the Mountain and the Flood (1887), his Six Scotch Dances (1896), his operas Jeanie Deans (1894) and Dairmid (1897) and choral works on Scottish subjects have been described by I. G. C. Hutchison as the musical equivalent of Abbotsford and Balmoral. McEwen's more overtly national works include Grey Galloway (1908), the Solway Symphony (1911) and Prince Charlie, A Scottish Rhapsody (1924).

== Historiography ==
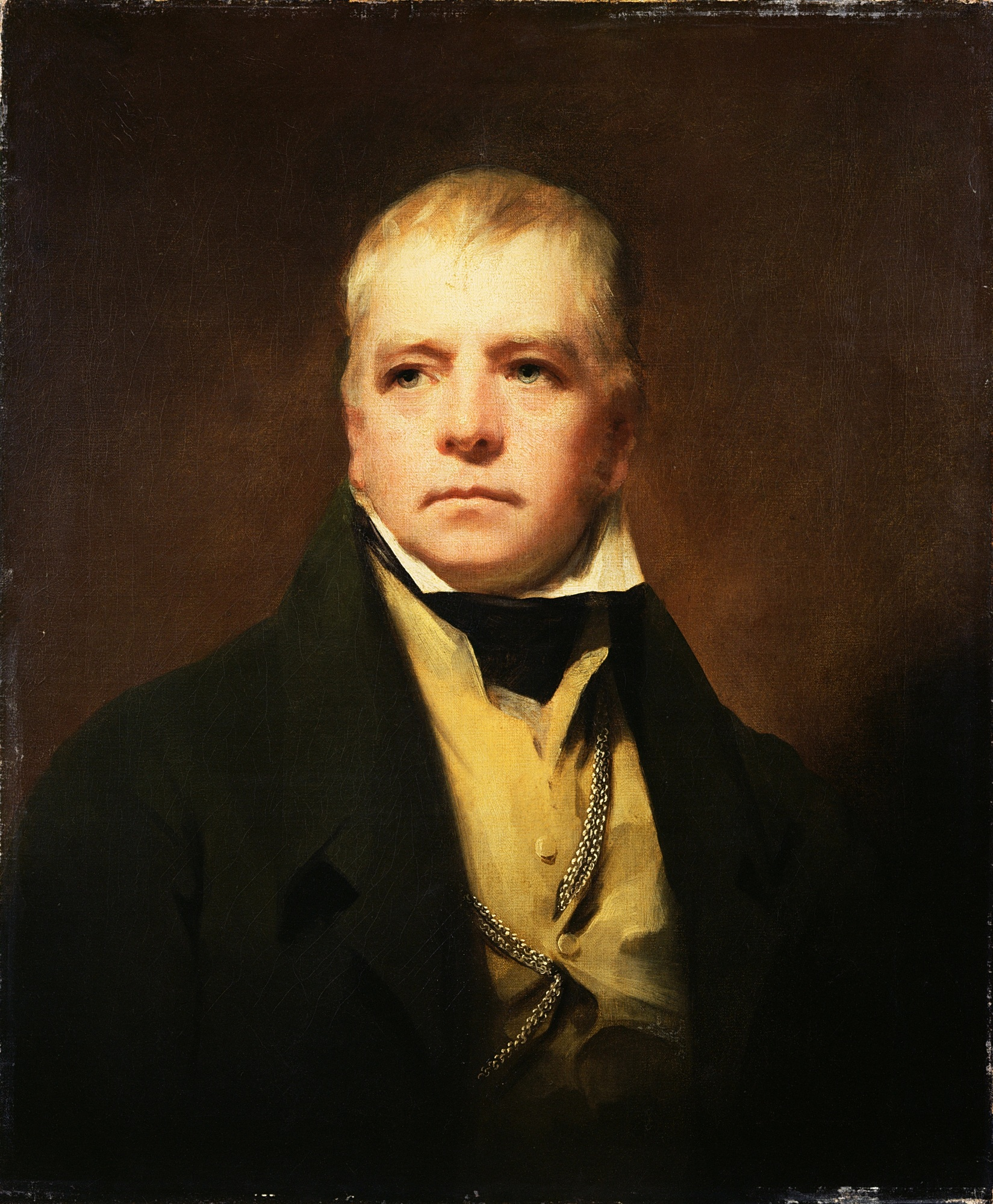
Portrait of Sir Walter Scott by Henry Raeburn, 1823

In contrast to Enlightenment histories, which have been seen as attempting to draw general lessons about humanity from history, the German philosopher Johann Gottfried von Herder in his Ideas upon Philosophy and the History of Mankind (1784), set out the concept of Volksgeist, a unique national spirit that drove historical change. As a result, a key element in the influence of Romanticism on intellectual life was the production of national histories. The nature and existence of a national Scottish historiography has been debated among historians. Those authors who consider that such a national history did exist in this period indicate that it can be found outside of the production of major historical narratives, in works of antiquarianism and fiction.

An important element in the emergence of a Scottish national history was an interest in antiquarianism, with figures like John Pinkerton (1758–1826) collecting sources such as ballads, coins, medals, songs and artefacts. Enlightenment historians had tended to react with embarrassment to Scottish history, particularly the feudalism of the Middle Ages and the religious intolerance of the Reformation. In contrast many historians of the early nineteenth century rehabilitated these areas as suitable for serious study. Lawyer and antiquarian Cosmo Innes, who produced works on Scotland in the Middle Ages (1860), and Sketches of Early Scottish History (1861), has been likened to the pioneering history of Georg Heinrich Pertz, one of the first writers to collate the major historical accounts of German history. Patrick Fraser Tytler's nine-volume history of Scotland (1828–43), particularity his sympathetic view of Mary, Queen of Scots, have led to comparisons with Leopold von Ranke, considered the father of modern scientific historical writing. Tytler was co-founder with Scott of the Bannatyne Society in 1823, which helped further the course of historical research in Scotland. Thomas M'Crie's (1797–1875) biographies of John Knox and Andrew Melville, figures generally savaged in the Enlightenment, helped rehabilitate their reputations. W. F. Skene's (1809–92) three part study of Celtic Scotland (1886–91) was the first serious investigation of the region and helped spawn the Scottish Celtic Revival. Issues of race became important, with Pinkerton, James Sibbald (1745–1803) and John Jamieson (1759–1839) subscribing to a theory of Picto-Gothicism, which postulated a Germanic origin for the Picts and the Scots language.

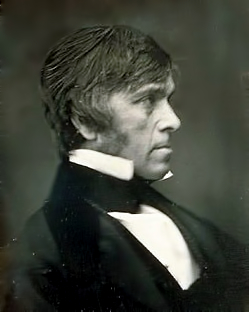
Thomas Carlyle, a major figure in Romantic historical writing

Among the most significant intellectual figures associated with Romanticism was Thomas Carlyle (1795–1881), born in Scotland and later a resident of London. He was largely responsible for bringing the works of German Romantics such as Schiller and Goethe to the attention of a British audience. An essayist and historian, he invented the phrase "hero-worship", lavishing largely uncritical praise on strong leaders such as Oliver Cromwell, Frederick the Great and Napoleon. His The French Revolution: A History (1837) dramatised the plight of the French aristocracy, but stressed the inevitability of history as a force. With French historian Jules Michelet, he is associated with the use of the "historical imagination". In Romantic historiography this led to a tendency to emphasise sentiment and identification, inviting readers to sympathise with historical personages and even to imagine interactions with them. In contrast to many continental Romantic historians, Carlyle remained largely pessimistic about human nature and events. He believed that history was a form of prophecy that could reveal patterns for the future. In the late nineteenth century he became one of a number of Victorian sage writers and social commentators.

Romantic writers often reacted against the empiricism of Enlightenment historical writing, putting forward the figure of the "poet-historian" who would mediate between the sources of history and the reader, using insight to create more than chronicles of facts. For this reason, Romantic historians such as Thierry saw Walter Scott, who had spent considerable effort uncovering new documents and sources for his novels, as an authority in historical writing. Scott is now seen primarily as a novelist, but also produced a nine-volume biography of Napoleon, and has been described as "the towering figure of Romantic historiography in Transatlantic and European contexts", having a profound effect on how history, particularly that of Scotland, was understood and written. Historians that acknowledged his influence included Chateaubriand, Macaulay, and Ranke.

== Science ==
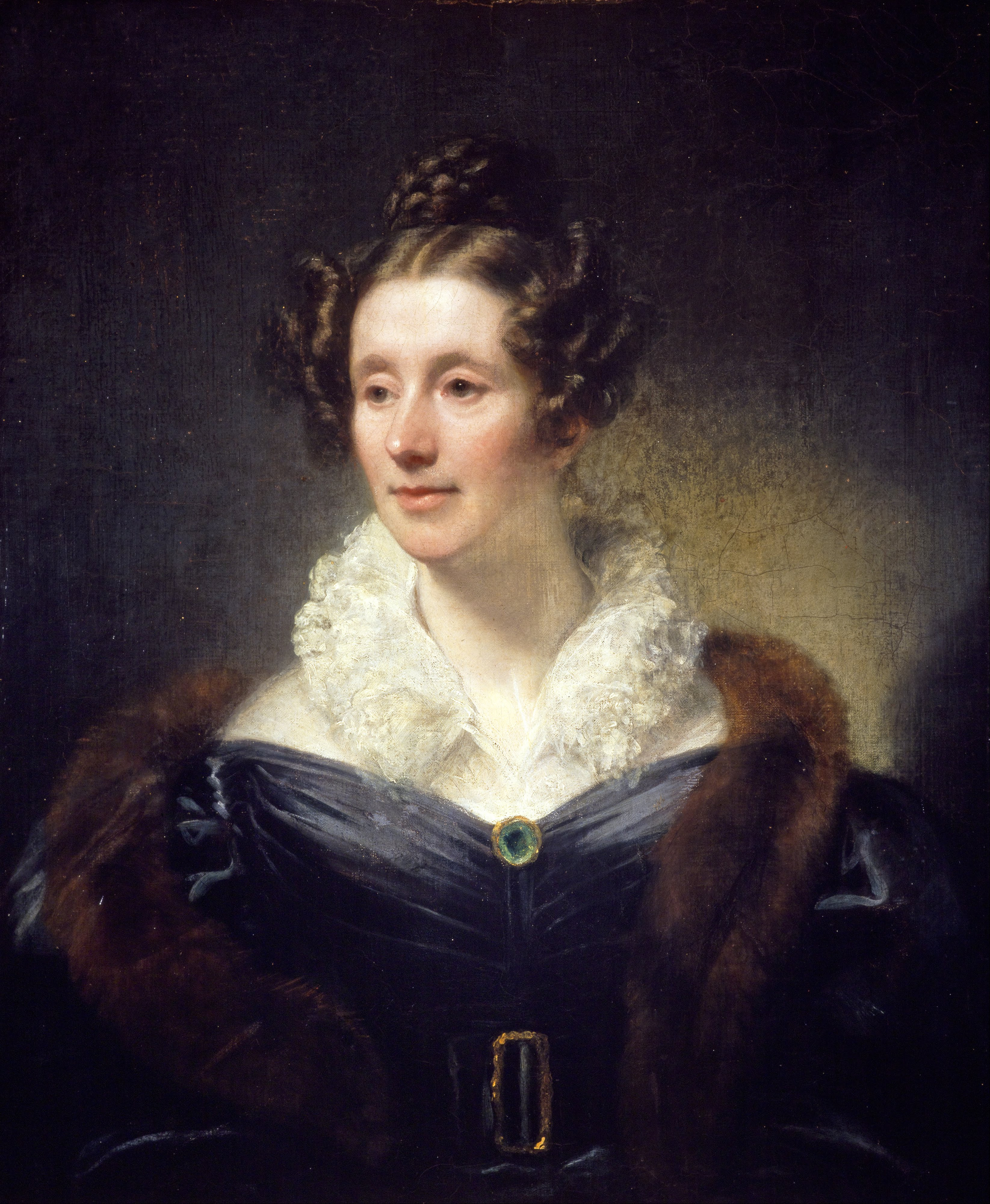
Mary Somerville, a major influence on Humboldtian science in Britain

Romanticism has also been seen as affecting scientific enquiry. Romantic attitudes to science varied, from distrust of the scientific enterprise to endorsing a non-mechanical science that rejected the mathematicised and the abstract theorising associated with Newton. Major trends in continental science associated with Romanticism include Naturphilosophie, developed by Friedrich Schelling (1775–1854), which focused on the necessity of reuniting man with nature, and Humboldtian science, based on the work of Alexander von Humboldt (1769–1859). As defined by Susan Cannon, this form of inquiry placed a stress on observation, accurate scientific instruments and new conceptual tools; disregarded the boundaries between different disciplines; and emphasised working in nature rather than the artificial laboratory. Privileging observation above calculation, Romantic scientists were often attracted to the areas where investigation, rather than calculation and theory, was most important, particularly the life sciences, geology, optics and astronomy.

James Allard identifies the origins of Scottish "Romantic medicine" in the work of Enlightenment figures, particularly the brothers William (1718–83) and John Hunter (1728–93), who were, respectively, the leading anatomist and surgeon of their day and in the role of Edinburgh as a major centre of medical teaching and research. Key figures that were influenced by the Hunters' work and by Romanticism include John Brown (1735–88), Thomas Beddoes (1760–1808) and John Barclay (1758–1826). Brown argued in Elementa Medicinae (1780) that life is an essential "vital energy" or "excitability" and that disease is either the excessive or diminished redistribution of the normal intensity of the human organ, which became known as Brunonianism. This work was highly influential, particularly in Germany, on the development of Naturphilosophie. This work was translated and edited by Beddoes, another graduate of Edinburgh, whose own work, Hygeia, or Essays Moral and Medical (1807) expanded on these ideas. Following in this vein, Barclay in the 1810 edition of the Encyclopædia Britannica identified physiology as the branch of medicine closest to metaphysics. Also important were the brothers John (1763–1820) and Charles Bell (1774–1842), who made significant advances in the study of the vascular and nervous systems, respectively.

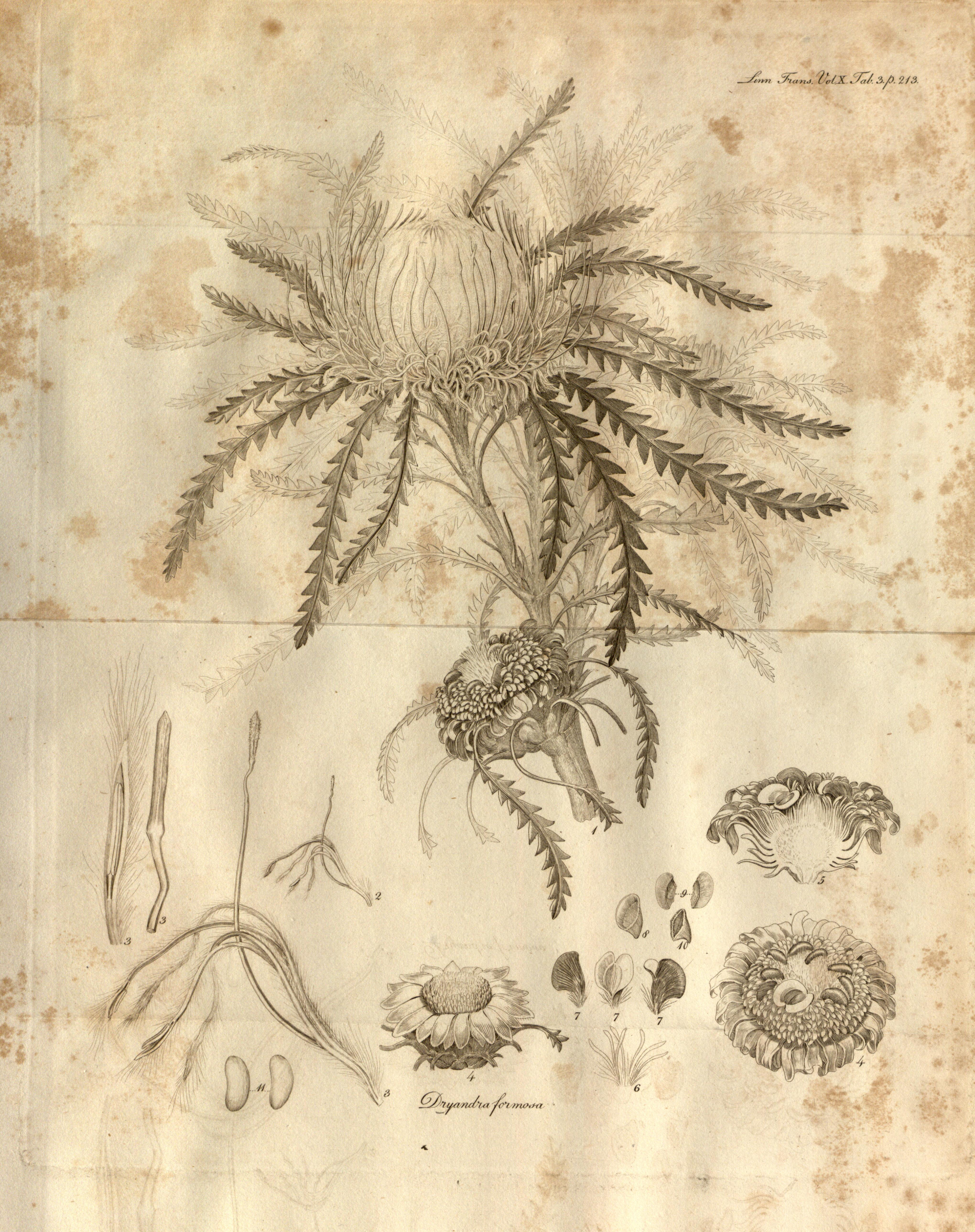
A plate from Robert Brown's paper "On the natural order of plants called Proteaceae" (1810)

The University of Edinburgh was also a major supplier of surgeons for the royal navy, and Robert Jameson (1774–1854), Professor of Natural History at Edinburgh, ensured that a large number of these were surgeon-naturalists, who were vital in the Humboldtian and imperial enterprise of investigating nature throughout the world. These included Robert Brown (1773–1858), one of the major figures in the early exploration of Australia. His later use of the microscope paralleled that noted among German students of Naturphilosophie, and he is credited with the discovery of the cell nucleus and the first observation of Brownian motion. Charles Lyell's work Principles of Geology (1830) is often seen as the foundation of modern geology. It was indebted to Humboldtian science in its insistence on measurements of nature, and, according to Noah Heringman, retains a much of the "rhetoric of the sublime", which is characteristic of Romantic attitudes to landscape.

Romantic thinking was also evident in the writings of Hugh Miller, stonemason and geologist, who followed in the tradition of Naturphilosophie, arguing that nature was a pre-ordained progression towards the human race. Publisher, historian, antiquarian and scientist Robert Chambers (1802–71) became a friend of Scott, writing a biography of him after the author's death. Chambers also became a geologist, researching in Scandinavia and Canada. His most influential work was the anonymously published Vestiges of the Natural History of Creation (1844), which was the most comprehensive written argument in favour of evolution before the work of Charles Darwin (1809–82). His work was strongly influenced by transcendental anatomy, which, drawing on Goethe and Lorenz Oken (1779–1851), looked for ideal patterns and structure in nature and had been pioneered in Scotland by figures including Robert Knox (1791–1862).

David Brewster (1781–1868), physicist, mathematician and astronomer, undertook key work in optics, where he provided a compromise between Goethe's Naturphilosophie-influenced studies and Newton's system, which Goethe attacked. His work would be important in later biological, geological and astrological discoveries. Diligent measurement in South Africa allowed Thomas Henderson (1798–1844) make the observations that would allow him to be the first to calculate the distance to Alpha Centauri, before returning to Edinburgh to become the first Astronomer Royal for Scotland from 1834. Influenced by Humboldt, and much praised by him, was Mary Somerville (1780–1872), mathematician, geographer, physicist, astronomer and one of the few women to gain recognition in science in the period. A major contribution to the "magnetic crusade" declared by Humboldt was made by Scottish-born astronomer John Lamont (1805–79), head of the observatory in Munich, when he found a decennial period (ten-year cycle) in the Earth's magnetic field.

== Politics ==
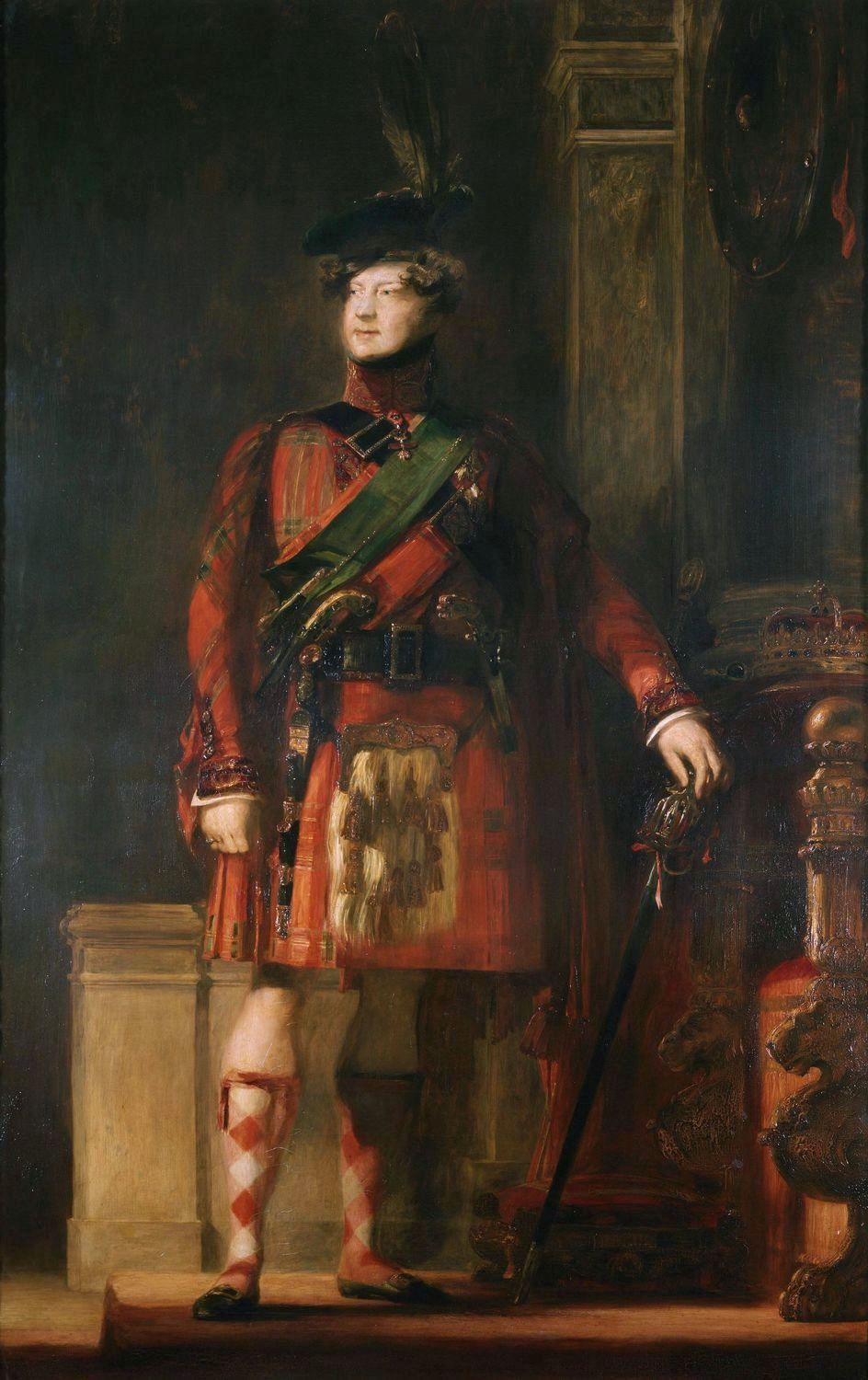
George IV in Highland Dress, 1829. David Wilkie's flattering portrait of the kilted King George IV

In the aftermath of the Jacobite risings, a movement to restore Stuart King James II of England to the throne, the British government enacted a series of laws that attempted to speed the process of the destruction of the clan system. Measures included a ban on the bearing of arms, the wearing of tartan and limitations on the activities of the Episcopalian Church. Most of the legislation was repealed by the end of the eighteenth century as the Jacobite threat subsided.

Soon after, there was a process of the rehabilitation of highland culture. Tartan had already been adopted for highland regiments in the British army, which poor highlanders joined in large numbers until the end of the Napoleonic Wars in 1815, but by the nineteenth century it had largely been abandoned by the ordinary people of the region. In the 1820s, tartan and the kilt were adopted by members of the social elite, not just in Scotland, but across Europe. The international craze for tartan, and for idealising a romanticised Highlands, was set off by the Ossian cycle and further popularised by the works of Scott. His "staging" of the royal visit of King George IV to Scotland in 1822 and the king's wearing of tartan resulted in a massive upsurge in demand for kilts and tartans that could not be met by the Scottish linen industry. Individual clan tartans was largely defined in this period, and they became a major symbol of Scottish identity. This "Highlandism", by which all of Scotland was identified with the culture of the Highlands, was cemented by Queen Victoria's interest in the country, her adoption of Balmoral as a major royal retreat and her interest in "tartanry".

The romanticisation of the Highlands and the adoption of Jacobitism into mainstream culture have been seen as defusing the potential threat to the Union with England, the House of Hanover and the dominant Whig government. In many countries Romanticism played a major part in the emergence of radical independence movements through the development of national identities. Tom Nairn argues that Romanticism in Scotland did not develop along the lines seen elsewhere in Europe, leaving a "rootless" intelligentsia, who moved to England or elsewhere and so did not supply a cultural nationalism that could be communicated to the emerging working classes. Graeme Moreton and Lindsay Paterson both argue that the lack of interference of the British state in civil society meant that the middle classes had no reason to object to the union. Atsuko Ichijo argues that national identity cannot be equated with a movement for independence. Moreton suggests that there was a Scottish nationalism, but that it was expressed in terms of "Unionist nationalism". A form of political radicalism remained within Scottish Romanticism, surfacing in events like the foundation of the Friends of the People in 1792 and in 1853 the National Association for the Vindication of Scottish Rights, which was in effect a federation of romantics, radical churchmen and administrative reformers. However, Scottish identity was not directed into nationalism until the twentieth century.

== Philosophy ==
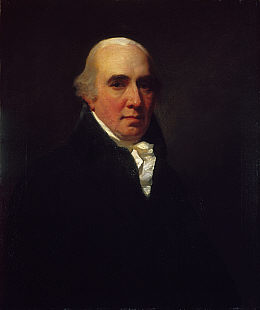
Dugald Stewart, a major figure in the popularisation of Common Sense Realism

The dominant school of philosophy in Scotland in the late eighteenth century and the first half of the nineteenth century is known as Common Sense Realism. It argued that there are certain concepts, such as our existence, the existence of solid objects and some basic moral "first principles", that are intrinsic to our make-up and from which all subsequent arguments and systems of morality must be derived. It can be seen as an attempt to reconcile the new scientific developments of the Enlightenment with religious belief. The origins of these arguments are in a reaction to the scepticism that became dominant in the Enlightenment, particularly that articulated by Scottish philosopher David Hume (1711–76). This branch of thinking was first formulated by Thomas Reid (1710–96) in his An Inquiry into the Human Mind on the Principles of Common Sense (1764). It was popularised in Scotland by figures including Dugald Stewart (1753–1828) and in England by James Beattie. Stewart's students included Walter Scott, Walter Chambers and Thomas Brown, and this branch of thought would later be a major influence on Charles Darwin. William Hamilton (1788–1856) attempted to combine Reid's approach with the philosophy of Kant.

Common Sense Realism not only dominated Scottish thought but also had a major impact in France, the United States, Germany and other countries. Victor Cousin (1792–1867) was the most important proponent in France, becoming Minister of Education and incorporating the philosophy into the curriculum. In Germany the emphasis on careful observation influenced Humboldt's ideas about science and was a major factor in the development of German Idealism. James McCosh (1811–94) brought Common Sense Realism directly from Scotland to North American in 1868 when he became president of Princeton University, which soon became a stronghold of the movement. Noah Porter (1811–92) taught Common Sense Realism to generations of students at Yale. As a result, it would be a major influence on the development of one of the most important offshoots of Romanticism in New England, Transcendentalism, particularly in the writing of Ralph Waldo Emerson (1803–82).

== Decline ==
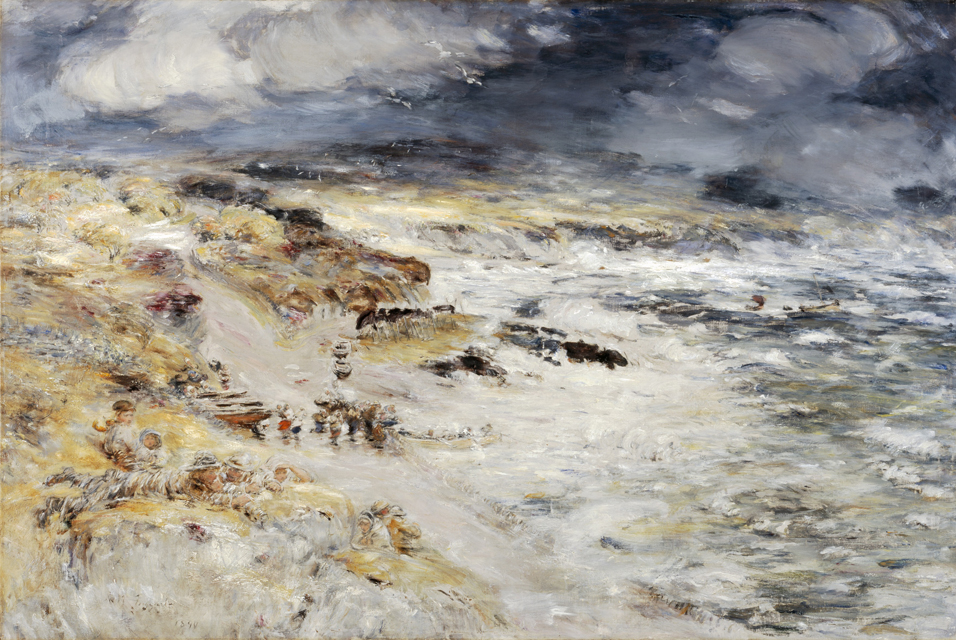
William McTaggart's The Storm, 1890, incorporating elements of Impressionism into the Scottish landscape tradition

In literature, Romanticism is often thought to have ended in the 1830s, with a few commentators, like Margaret Drabble, describing it as over by 1848. Romanticism continued much longer in some places and areas of endeavour, particularly in music, where it has been dated from 1820 to 1910. The death of Scott in 1832 has been seen as marking the end of the great romantic generation, and Scottish literature and culture in general lost some of its international prominence from this point. Scott's reputation as a writer also went into decline in the late nineteenth century, only recovering in the twentieth. Economic and social change, particularly the better communications brought by the railways, decreased the ability of Edinburgh to function as an alternative cultural capital to London, with its publishing industry moving to London. Lack of opportunities in politics and letters led many talented Scots to leave for England and elsewhere. The sentimental Kailyard tradition of J. M. Barrie and George MacDonald, of those that continued to pursue Scottish topics at the end of the nineteenth century, was seen by Tom Nairn as "sub-romantic".

In art, the tradition of Scottish landscape painting continued into the later nineteenth century, but Romanticism gave way to influences including French Impressionism, Post-Impressionism and eventually Modernism. The Scots baronial style continued to be popular until the end of the nineteenth century, when other styles began to dominate. Although Romanticism persisted in music much longer than in almost every area, it fell out of fashion in the twentieth century and anti-Romantic currents in Britain virtually buried Victorian and Edwardian music not written by Edward Elgar or Arthur Sullivan. The idea of the historical imagination was replaced with the source-based empiricism championed by Ranke. Marinel Ash has noted that after the death of Scott, Scottish national history lost its momentum, and the Scottish literati stopped writing Scottish histories. Colin Kidd has observed a change of attitudes to historical writing and suggests that this was one reason for a lack of the development of political nationalism. In science, the rapid expansion of knowledge increased a tendency towards specialisation and professionalism and a decline of the polymath "man of letters" and amateurs that had dominated Romantic science. Common Sense Realism began to decline in Britain in the face of the English empiricism outlined by John Stuart Mill in his An Examination of Sir William Hamilton's Philosophy (1865).

== Influence ==
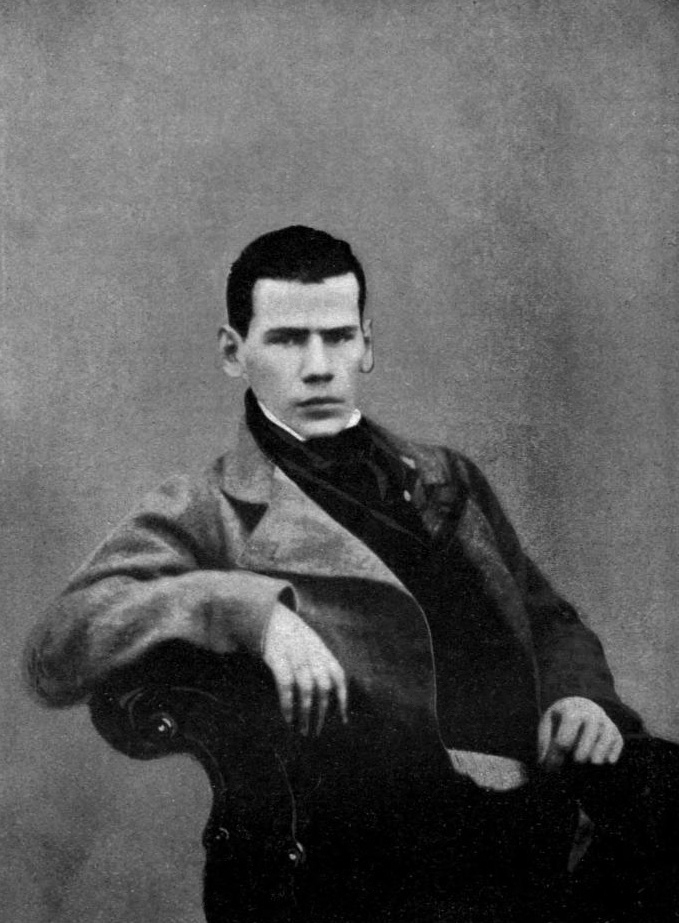
The young Leo Tolstoy, one of the many writers directly influenced by Scottish Romanticism

Scotland can make a claim to have begun the Romantic movement with writers such as Macpherson and Burns. In Scott it produced a figure of international fame and influence, whose virtual invention of the historical novel would be picked up by writers across the world, including Alexandre Dumas and Honoré de Balzac in France, Leo Tolstoy in Russia and Alessandro Manzoni in Italy. The tradition of Scottish landscape painting significantly influenced art in Britain and elsewhere through figures like J. M. W. Turner, who took part in the emerging Scottish "grand tour". The Scottish baronial style influenced buildings in England and was taken by Scots to North America, Australia and New Zealand. In music, the early efforts of men like Burns, Scott and Thompson helped insert Scottish music into European, particularly German, classical music, and the later contributions of composers like MacCuun were part of a Scottish contribution to the British revival of interest in classical music in the late nineteenth century.

The idea of history as a force and the romantic concept of revolution were highly influential on transcendentalists like Emerson, and through them on American literature in general. Romantic science maintained the prominence and reputation that Scotland had begun to obtain in the Enlightenment and helped in the development of many emerging fields of investigation, including geology and biology. According to Robert D. Purington, "to some the nineteenth century seems to be the century of Scottish science". Politically the initial function of Romanticism as pursued by Scott and others helped to diffuse some of the tension created by Scotland's place in the Union, but it also helped to ensure the survival of a common and distinct Scottish national identity that would play a major part in Scottish life and emerge as a significant factor in Scottish politics from the second half of the twentieth century. Externally, modern images of Scotland worldwide, its landscape, culture, sciences and arts, are still largely defined by those created and popularised by Romanticism.
