= Music of Scotland in the nineteenth century =

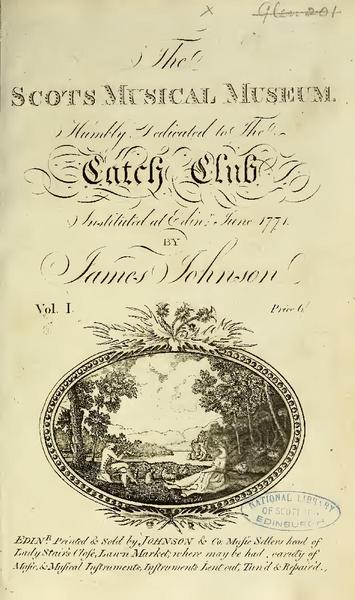
Frontispage of Burns, The Scots Musical Museum (1787)

Music of Scotland in the nineteenth century includes all forms of music production in the period, in Scotland or by Scottish people.

The nineteenth century saw the reintroduction of accompanied music into the Church of Scotland. Organs began to be added to churches in large numbers and by the end of the century, roughly a third of Church of Scotland, over 80 per cent of kirks, had both organs and choirs. Similarly, in the Episcopalian Church the influence of the Oxford Movement and links with the Anglican Church led to the introduction of more traditional services, and by 1900 surpliced choirs and musical services were the norm. The Free Church that broke away from the kirk in 1843 in the Great Disruption, was more conservative over music, and organs were not permitted until 1883. Hymns were first introduced in the United Presbyterian Church in the 1850s. The visit of American Evangelists Ira D. Sankey, and Dwight L. Moody to Edinburgh and Glasgow in 1874–75 helped popularise accompanied church music in Scotland.

In the late eighteenth and early nineteenth century there was and an attempt to produce a corpus of Scottish national song, involving Robert Burns and George Thomson, which helped make Scottish songs part of the European cannon of classical music. The bothy ballads, which dealt with the lives of agricultural workers, were mainly written in the period 1820–60 and then adapted and altered along with working life in the later part of the century. Evidence of continued activity in traditional music includes the manuscripts of James Simpson (f. 1820–30). The tradition continued with figures including James Scott Skinner. From the late nineteenth century there was renewed interest in traditional music, which was more academic and political in intent. In the late nineteenth century the revival would begin to have a major impact on classical music, with the development of what was in effect a national school of orchestral and operatic music in Scotland.

The tradition of European concert music in Scotland, which had been established in the eighteenth century faltered towards the end of the century. From the mid-nineteenth century classical music began a revival in Scotland, aided by the visits of Frédéric Chopin and Felix Mendelssohn. Major composers included of the national school that developed in the late nineteenth century included Alexander Mackenzie, William Wallace), Learmont Drysdale and Hamish MacCunn. In the late part of the century, performers emerged who gained international reputations. They included Frederic Lamond, Mary Garden and Joseph Hislop.

== Church music ==
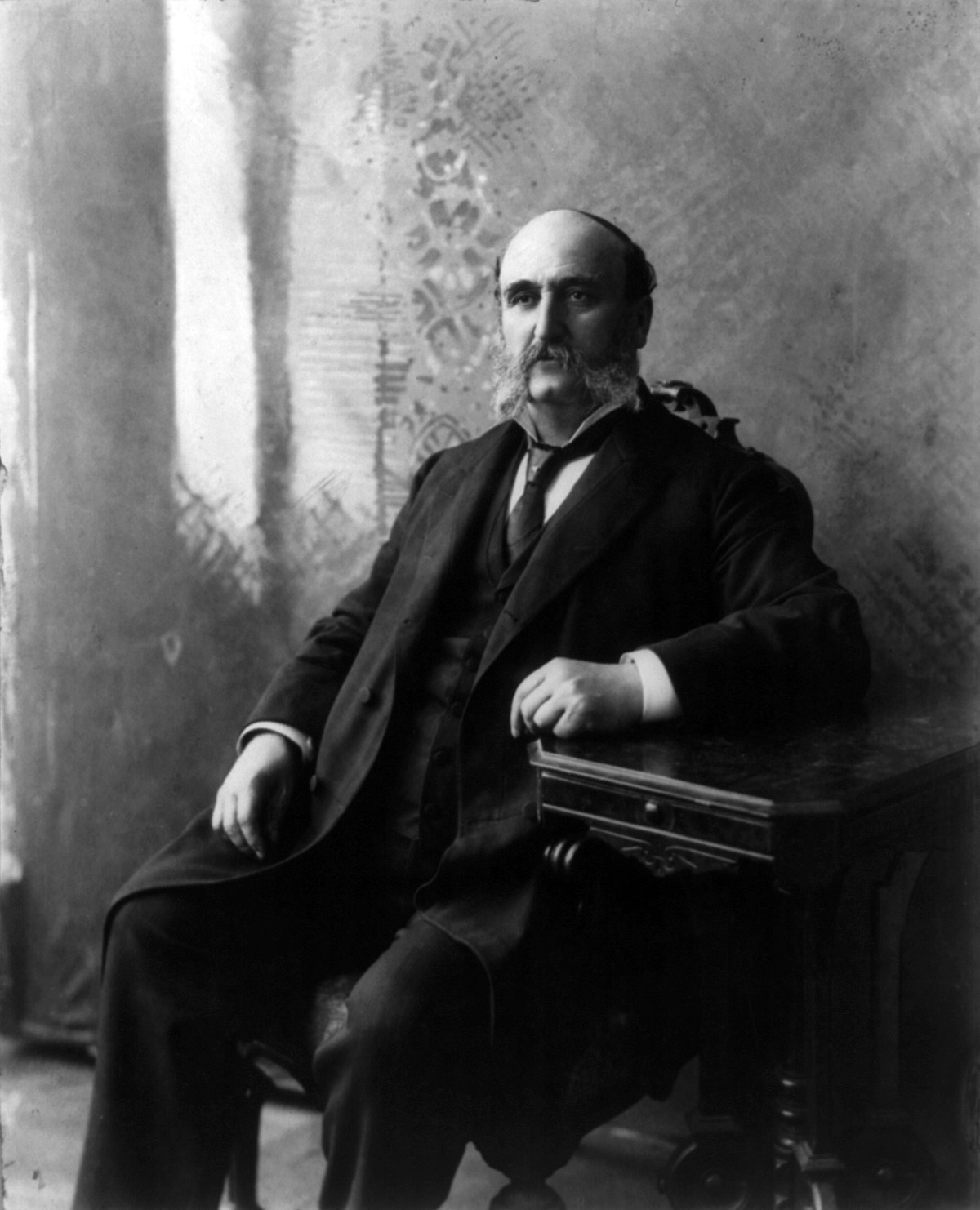
Ira D. Sankey, whose singing and compositions helped popularise accompanied church music in Scotland in the late nineteenth century

The nineteenth century saw the reintroduction of accompanied music into the Church of Scotland. This was strongly influenced by the English Oxford Movement, which encouraged a return to Medieval forms of architecture and worship. The first organ to be installed by a Church of Scotland church after the Reformation was at St. Andrews, Glasgow in 1804, but it was not in the church building and was used only for weekly rehearsals. Two years later the city council was petitioned to allow it to be moved into the church, but they deferred to the local presbytery, who decided, after much deliberation, that they were illegal and prohibited their use within their jurisdiction. In 1828 the first organ was controversially installed in an Edinburgh church. Around the same time James Steven published his Harmonia Sacra: A Selection of the Most Approved Psalm and Hymn Tunes, provocatively printed a frontispiece showing a small organ. The Church Service Society was founded in 1865 to promote liturgical study and reform and a year later organs were officially admitted to churches. They began to be added to churches in large numbers and by the end of the century roughly a third of Church of Scotland ministers were members of the society and over 80 per cent of kirks had both organs and choirs. However, they remained controversial, with considerable opposition among conservative elements within the church and organs were never placed in some churches.

Similarly, in the Episcopalian Church the influence of the Oxford Movement and links with the Anglican Church led to the introduction of more traditional services and by 1900 surpliced choirs and musical services were the norm. The Free Church that broke away from the kirk in 1843 in the Great Disruption, was more conservative over music, and organs were not permitted until 1883. Hymns were first introduced in the United Presbyterian Church in the 1850s. They became common in the Church of Scotland and Free Church in the 1870s. The Church of Scotland adopted a hymnal with 200 songs in 1870 and the Free Church followed suit in 1882. The visit of American Evangelists Ira D. Sankey (1840–1908), and Dwight L. Moody (1837–99) to Edinburgh and Glasgow in 1874–75 helped popularise accompanied church music in Scotland. The Moody-Sankey hymnbook remained a best seller into the twentieth century. Sankey made the harmonium so popular that working-class mission congregations pleaded for the introduction of accompanied music.

== Traditional music ==
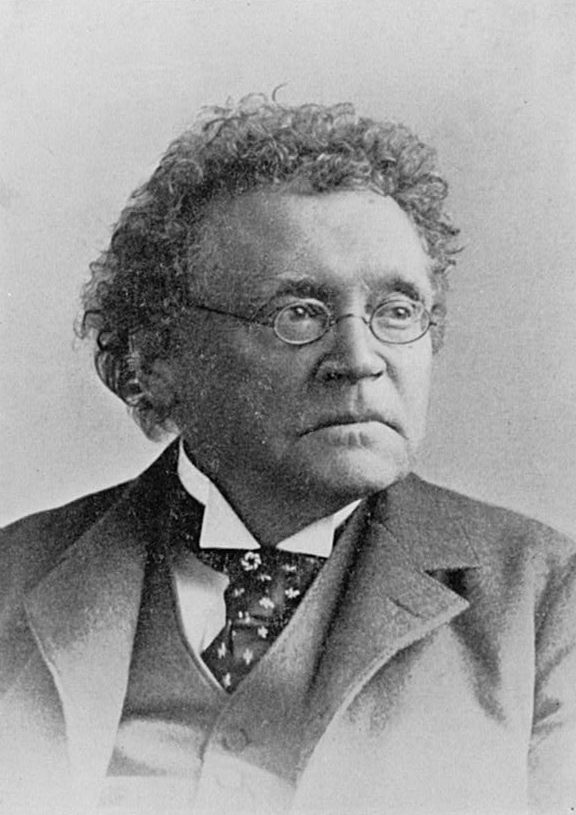
Francis James Child, one of the key figures in beginning the first folk revival

In the late eighteenth century and early nineteenth century there was and an attempt to produce a corpus of Scottish national song, involving Robert Burns (1759–96) building on the work of antiquarians and musicologists such as William Tytler (1711–92), James Beattie (1735–1803) and Joseph Ritson (1752–1803). Working with music engraver and seller James Johnson, Burns contributed about a third of the eventual songs of the collection known as The Scots Musical Museum, issued between 1787 and 1803 in six volumes. Burns collaborated with George Thomson (1757–1851) in A Select Collection of Original Scottish Airs, published from 1793 to 1818, which adapted Scottish folk songs with "classical" arrangements. Thompson was inspired by hearing Scottish songs sung by visiting Italian castrati at the St Cecilia Concerts in Edinburgh. He collected Scottish songs and commissioned musical arrangements from the best European composers, who included Joseph Haydn (1732–1809) and Ludwig van Beethoven (1770–1827). Burns was employed in editing the lyrics. A Select Collection of Original Scottish Airs was published in five volumes between 1799 and 1818. It helped make Scottish songs part of the European cannon of classical music, while Thompson's work brought elements of Romanticism, such as harmonies based on those of Beethoven, into Scottish classical music. Also involved in the collection and publication of Scottish songs was Walter Scott (1771–1832), whose first literary effort was Minstrelsy of the Scottish Border, published in three volumes (1802–03). This collection first drew the attention of an international audience to his work, and some of his lyrics were set to music by Franz Peter Schubert (1797–1828), who also created a setting of Ossian.

The bothy ballads, which dealt with the lives of agricultural workers, who lived in bothies or farm buildings, were mainly written in the period 1820–60 and then adapted and altered along with working life in the later part of the century. Evidence of continued activity in traditional music includes the manuscripts of James Simpson (f. 1820–30), a Dundee flautist, whose music incorporated reels and strathspeys with waltzes and quadrilles. The tradition continued with figures including James Scott Skinner (1843–1927), known as the "Strathspey King", who played the fiddle in venues ranging from the local functions in his native Banchory, to urban centres of the south and at Balmoral.

From the late nineteenth century there was renewed interest in traditional music, which was more academic and political in intent. Harvard professor Francis James Child's (1825–96) eight-volume collection The English and Scottish Popular Ballads (1882–92) has been the most influential on defining the repertoire of subsequent performers and the English music teacher Cecil Sharp was probably the most important in understanding of the nature of folk song. In Scotland collectors included the Reverend James Duncan (1848–1917) and Gavin Greig (1856–1914), who collected over 1,000 songs, mainly from Aberdeenshire. In the late nineteenth century the revival would begin to have a major impact on classical music, with the development of what was in effect a national school of orchestral and operatic music in Scotland.

== Classical music ==
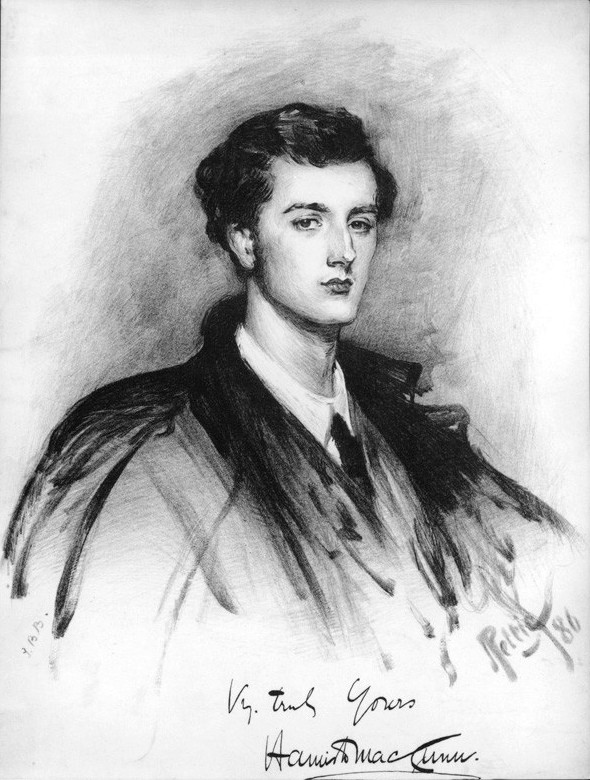
Hamish MacCunn, one of the key composers of the Romantic movement in Scotland

The tradition of European concert music in Scotland, which had been established in the eighteenth century faltered towards the end of the century. The Edinburgh Musical Society gave its last concert in 1798 and was wound up in 1801, with its concert hall sold off to become a Baptist church.

From the mid-nineteenth century classical music began a revival in Scotland, aided by the visits of Frédéric Chopin (1810–49) and Felix Mendelssohn (1809–47) in the 1840s. Mendelssohn was probably the most influential composer of his era and visited Britain ten times, for a total of twenty months, from 1829. Scotland inspired two of his most famous works, the overture Fingal's Cave (also known as the Hebrides Overture) and the Scottish Symphony (Symphony No. 3). On his last visit to England in 1847, he conducted his own Scottish Symphony with the Philharmonic Orchestra before Queen Victoria and Prince Albert. Max Bruch (1838–1920) composed the Scottish Fantasy (1880) for violin and orchestra, which includes an arrangement of the tune "Hey Tuttie Tatie", best known for its use in the song "Scots Wha Hae" by Burns.

Major composers included of the national school that developed in the late nineteenth century included Alexander Mackenzie (1847–1935), William Wallace (1860–1940), Learmont Drysdale (1866–1909) and Hamish MacCunn (1868–1916). Mackenzie, who studied in Germany and Italy and mixed Scottish themes with German Romanticism, is best known for his three Scottish Rhapsodies (1879–80, 1911), Pibroch for violin and orchestra (1889) and the Scottish Concerto for piano (1897), all involving Scottish themes and folk melodies. Wallace's work included an overture, In Praise of Scottish Poesie (1894). Drysdale's work often dealt with Scottish themes, including the overture Tam O’ Shanter (1890), the cantata The Kelpie (1891). MacCunn's overture The Land of the Mountain and the Flood (1887), his Six Scotch Dances (1896), his operas Jeanie Deans (1894) and Dairmid (1897) and choral works on Scottish subjects have been described by I. G. C. Hutchison as the musical equivalent of the Scots Baronial castles of Abbotsford and Balmoral. Similarly, McEwen's Pibroch (1889), Border Ballads (1908) and Solway Symphony (1911) incorporated traditional Scottish folk melodies.

In the late part of the century performers emerged who gained international reputations. These included the pianist Frederic Lamond (1868–1948), and singers Mary Garden (1874–1967) and Joseph Hislop (1884–1977). The Scottish Orchestra was founded in 1891 and the Glasgow Athenaeum in 1893.
