= Ethel Douglas =

Church elder and legal secretary (1916–2020)

- Born: 30 June 1916
- Died: 5 June 2020 (aged 103)
- Education: The University of Edinburgh
- Employer: Law Society of Scotland
- Known for: Assistant Secretary of the Law Society of Scotland, first woman elder at Greenside Parish Church, Edinburgh

Ethel Douglas (30 June 1916 – 5 June 2020) was assistant secretary of the Law Society of Scotland, and one of the first women to be an elder when this was permitted (1970) in the Church of Scotland, in Greenside Parish Church, Edinburgh, and was president of the Guild.

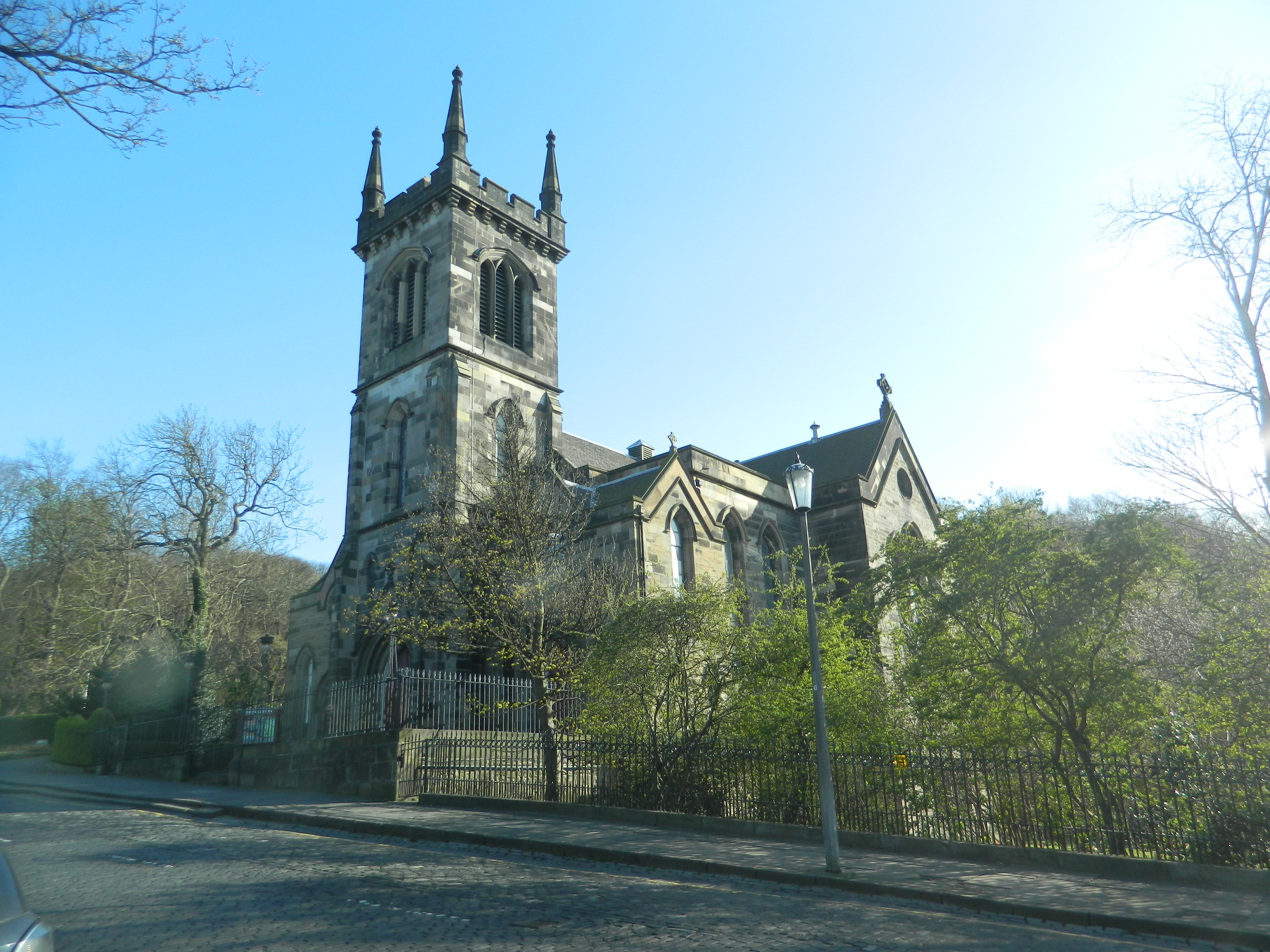
Greenside Parish Church

== Life and work ==
Born on 30 June 1916, to Agnes and James Douglas, who was a fishmonger. She was educated at Broughton School and the University of Edinburgh, where she was one of only five women in her class taking Law (out of 50 students), and was also caring for her mother.

In World War II, Douglas volunteered as a first-aider with the Women's Voluntary Service and later in the Auxiliary Fire Service.

Her career began with the legal firm, GW Tait & Sons and then was appointed to the Law Society of Scotland, the professional body, as assistant secretary responsible for legal education. She visited schools and universities across Scotland, assisting students. Her contribution was recognised by the President of the Law Society when she retired thirty years later:

"Ethel’s work with the Law Society is well known. She has always been concerned with the examination and admission of entrants and her sympathy and understanding of their difficulties endeared her to all who came in touch with her. No one has been more ready to help and encourage so many entrants to the profession. The profession, and particularly the entrants who have qualified since the last war, owe her a deep debt of gratitude."

Colleagues in large numbers wrote on her retirement to the society, one saying 'no name in the whole legal profession so well-known and more affectionately remembered by generations of students.'

== Church service ==
Her father was a church elder, and in her youth, Douglas attended the Greenside Parish Church and became a girl guide and eventually guide captain. She first taught in the Sunday School, when she was seventeen years old and continued for twenty-five years.

She became the first woman elder at the church, in 1970 and served representing the parish for 31 years on the presbytery until retiring from the role when she was eighty-five years old. She had served as an elder for 50 years. She was the link person to St Columba's Hospice for twenty-seven years.

Douglas became president of the Woman's Guild in 1970.

Her death in a care home, was on 5 June 2020, aged 103.
