= Barclay Church =

Barclay Church may refer to:

- Barclay Viewforth Church, Edinburgh
- Dalmuir Barclay Church, Clydebank
