= Fergus MacCunn =

British animal welfare activist

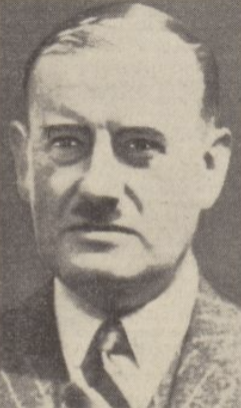
- Born: 19 April 1890; Hampstead, London
- Died: 18 May 1941 (aged 51); Upton upon Severn, Worcestershire
- Occupation: Activist
- Spouse: Maude Annie Scott (m. 1918)

Captain Fergus MacCunn (19 April 1890 – 18 May 1941) was an English animal welfare activist and chief secretary of the RSPCA.

== Career ==
MacCunn was educated at a private school in Cranleigh, Surrey. He served in the London Scottish and King's Own Yorkshire Light Infantry from 1914 to 1917. He was severely injured in 1917. E. Douglas Hume commented that "a bullet through the head put an end to his soldiering".

MacCunn joined the RSPCA in 1910, became assistant secretary in 1924 and succeeded Edward G. Fairholme as chief secretary of the RSPCA in 1934. He attended RSPCA meetings throughout Britain.

In February 1926, MacCunn lectured at Birkbeck College where he requested to form a new animal welfare society. His lecture was influential to C. W. Hume who founded the University of London Animal Welfare Society. He was the British delegate to Humane Association's 1935 convention in Washington. He was an honorary member of the Massachusetts Society for the Prevention of Cruelty to Animals. He organized the Finnish War Animals Fund during the Winter War in 1940 and re-opened the British Sick and Wounded Horses Fund.

He suffered from heart trouble and died in 1941, aged 51.

== Family ==
MacCunn was the son of Hamish MacCunn and Alison Pettie. He married Maude Annie Scott; they had one son, Robin.

== Selected publications ==
- The Royal Family and the R.S.P.C.A. In Crown and Empire (1937)
- Country Friends (1938)
- Pets for Young People (with Wellesley Pain, 1938)
- Cats (1945)
