= Presbytery of Edinburgh =

The Presbytery of Edinburgh was one of the presbyteries of the Church of Scotland, being the local presbytery for Edinburgh. Its boundary was almost identical to that of the City of Edinburgh Council area (i.e. also including Kirkliston and South Queensferry).

The last Clerk was the Reverend Marjorie McPherson. The Presbytery had represented and supervised 83 Church of Scotland congregations within the area. On 1 January 2022 the presbytery was merged with West Lothian Presbytery to form the Presbytery of Edinburgh and West Lothian. (https://westlothianpresbytery.org.uk/ )

== Congregations ==
Location	Dedication	Minister	Details
Albany Deaf Church		vacant	
Balerno Parish Church		Vacant	
Barclay Viewforth Church		Rev Samuel Torrens	
Blackhall St. Columba's Church		Rev Alexander Douglas	
Bristo Memorial Church, Craigmillar		Dráusio Gonçalves	
Broughton St Mary's Parish Church		vacant	
Canongate Kirk		Rev Neil Gardner	
Carrick Knowe Church		Rev Fiona M Mathieson	
Colinton Parish Church		Rev Rolf H. Billes	
Colinton Mains Parish Church		Rev Peter Nelson	
Corstorphine Old Parish Church		Rev Moira McDonald	
Craiglockhart Church		Rev Gordon Kennedy	
Craigmillar Park Church (linked with Reid Memorial)		Alex McAspurren	
Craigsbank Church		Rev Stewart M McPherson	
Cramond Kirk		Rev G Russell Barr	
Currie Kirk		Rev Easter Smart	
Davidson's Mains Parish Church		Rev Daniel Robertson	
Drylaw Church		Jenny Williams, transition minister	
Duddingston Kirk		Rev James A P Jack	
Fairmilehead Parish Church		Rev Cheryl McKellar Young	
Gorgie Parish Church		Rev Peter Barbour	
Granton Parish Church		Rev Norman Smith	
Greenbank Parish Church		Rev Martin Ritchie	
Greenside Parish Church		Alistair Wynne (locum)	
Greyfriars Tolbooth & Highland Kirk		Rev Dr Richard Frazer	
High Kirk of Edinburgh (St Giles Cathedral)		Rev Calum McLeod	
Inverleith St Serf's		Rev Shahrukh Gill	
Liberton Kirk		Rev Dr John Young	
Liberton Northfield Parish Church		Rev Mike Taylor	
Marchmont St Giles Church		Rev Karen Campbell	
Mayfield Salisbury Church		Rev Scott McKenna	
Meadowbank Church		Russell McLarty	
North Leith Parish Church		vacant	
Pilrig St. Paul's Church		Rev Mark Foster	
St Andrew's and St George's West Church		Rev Dr Rosie Magee	
St Catherine's Argyle Church		Stuart Irvin	
St Cuthbert's Church		Peter Sutton	
St Stephen's Comely Bank Church			
South Leith Parish Church		Rev Iain May	
Tron Moredun Church		Rev Cammy Mackenzie	

== See also ==
- Church of Scotland
- List of Church of Scotland synods and presbyteries
