= James Hood Wilson =

Scottish Minister and Temperance campaigner

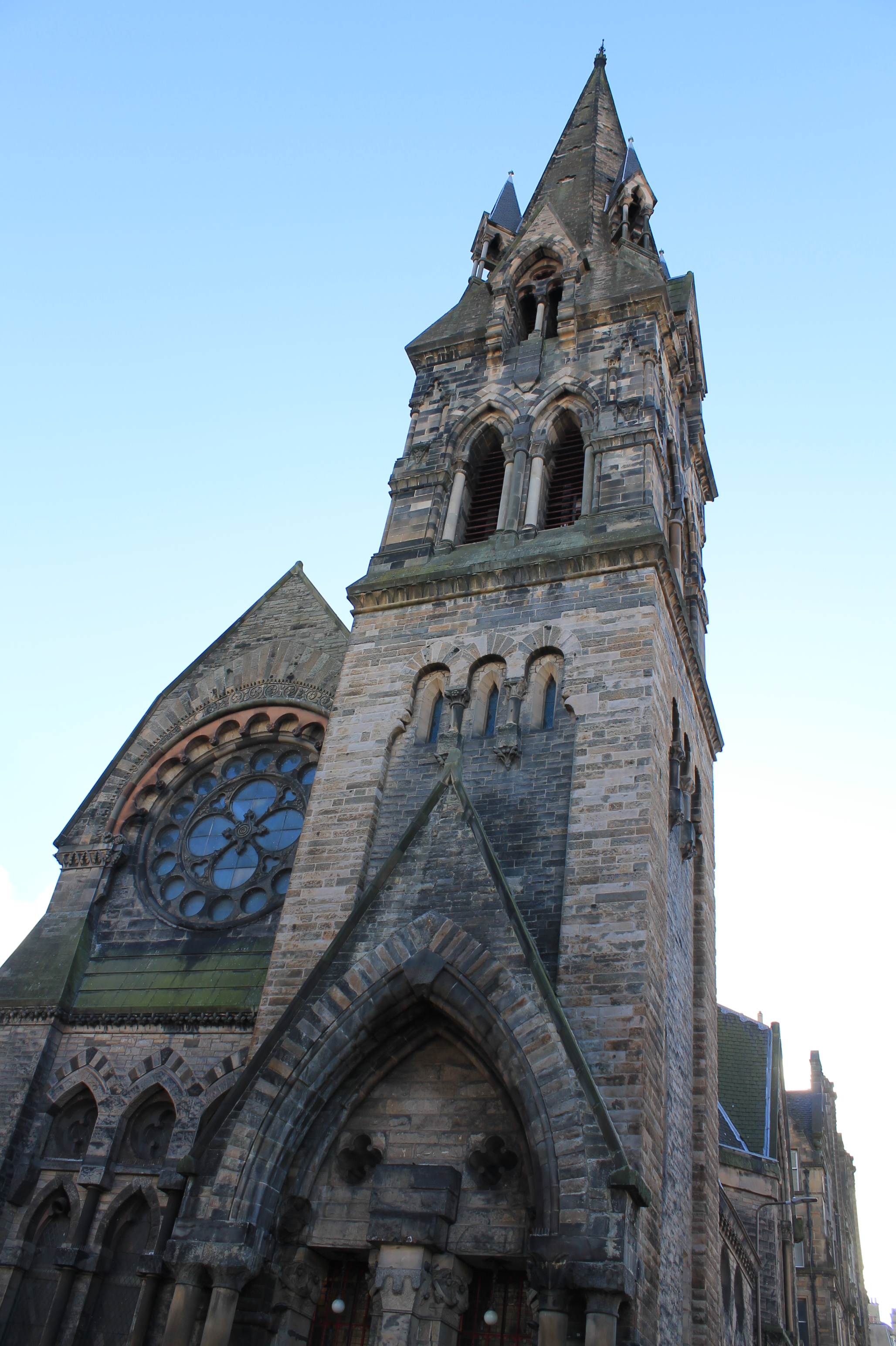
Barclay Bruntsfield Church, Edinburgh

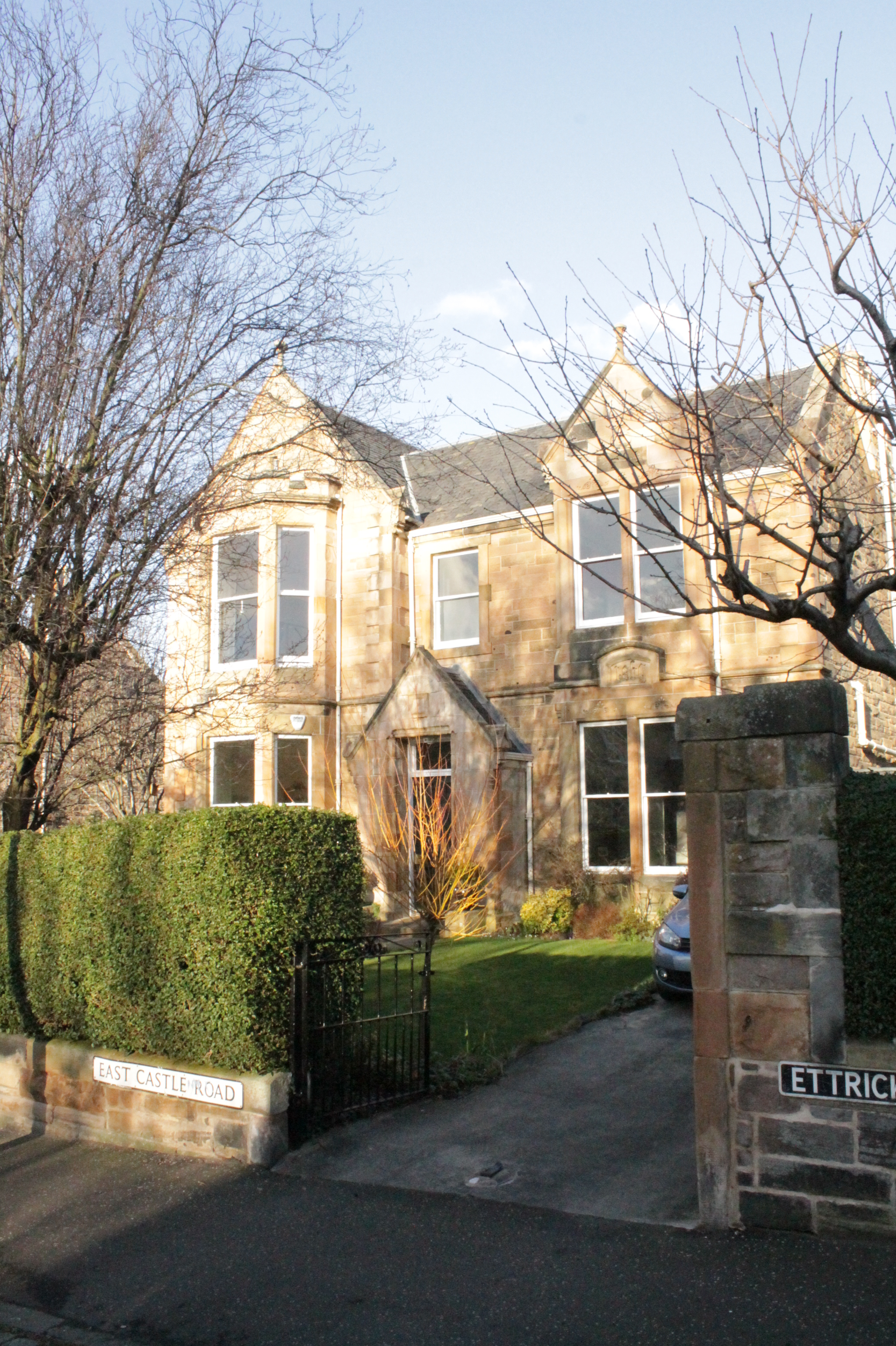
1 East Castle Road, Edinburgh

James Hood Wilson (7 February 1829 – 6 December 1903) was a Scottish minister of the Free Church of Scotland who served as Moderator of the General Assembly in 1895/96. He was a major campaigner for the Temperance movement in Scotland.

== Life ==
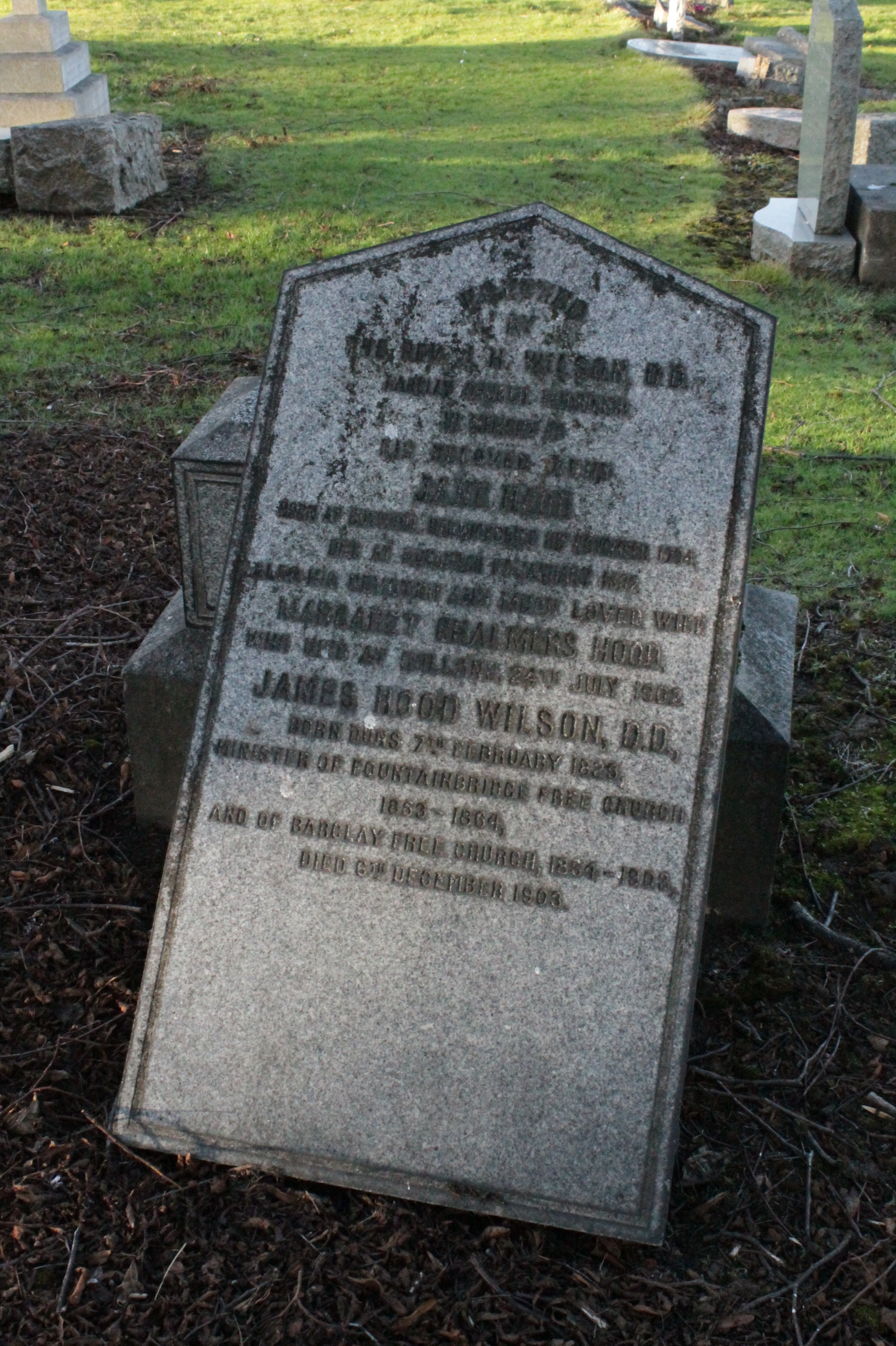
The grave of Rev James Hood Wilson, Morningside Cemetery

He was born on 7 February 1829 in Duns, Berwickshire, the son of Mary Hood of Bowshiel, first cousin to Rev Thomas McCrie, and John Wilson, a merchant. He was raised by his mother's twin sister, Jane Hood. The family belonged to the Secessionist Church.

He studied at the University of Edinburgh from 1843 and graduated in 1848. He then trained as a Free Church minister at New College, Edinburgh. He was licensed to preach in 1852 and ordained at Fountainbridge Free Church in Edinburgh in July 1854, residing at Fountainbridge manse. He was translated to Edinburgh's then newly built magnificent landmark Barclay Church in 1864 as its first minister.

In 1895 he succeeded Rev G. C. M. Douglas as Moderator of the General Assembly. He was succeeded in turn by Rev William Miller in 1896. He served on the Jewish Mission Committee and Home Mission Committee.

He retired in 1897 and was replaced at Barclay Church by Rev Dr W. M. Clow. He was permitted to stay at Barclay manse at 1 East Castle Road after his retirement. He died at the manse on 6 December 1903, and is buried in Morningside Cemetery, Edinburgh. The grave lies near the western end of the main east–west path, on its north side. The grave is currently (2019) toppled.

== Family ==
In 1865 he married Margaret Chalmers Hood (1825–1902), daughter of George Hood and his sister (sic) Janet Hood. Margaret appears to have been a first or second cousin. They had no children.

== Publications ==
- The King's Message
- The Gospel and its Fruits
- Our Father in Heaven
