= John Ansell =

English composer and conductor

- Born: 26 March 1874; London
- Died: 14 December 1948 (aged 74); Marlow, Buckinghamshire
- Occupation: Composer

John Ansell (26 March 1874 – 14 December 1948) was a British composer of light classical music.

== Early life ==
Born in London, he studied under Hamish MacCunn at the Guildhall School of Music, and played violin and viola in various orchestras before being appointed musical director at the Playhouse Theatre in 1907.

== Career ==
He became music director at the Alhambra Theatre in 1913, and later worked at other theatres including the Winter Garden Theatre. Between 1926 and 1930, he worked at the BBC as conductor of the 2LO Wireless Orchestra.

As well as incidental music, Ansell composed various popular light musical pieces, most notably the overture Plymouth Hoe, which incorporated several nautical melodies and continues to feature in the repertoire of orchestras and military bands; and another overture, The Windjammer. He also wrote operettas, including The King's Bride (1911), and Violette (1918); and the ballet The Shoe. Ansell's obituarist in The Times commented that his music "exhibits a soundness of construction and vein of fantasy which should ensure it the regard of discriminating audiences".

== Compositions ==
- April Bloom, entr'acte-dance
- Children's Suite
- Danses Miniatures de Ballet
- John and Sam overture
- Mediterranean Suite
- Overture to an Irish Comedy
- Plymouth Hoe, overture
- Private Ortheris overture
- Suite Pastorale
- The Grand Vizier, characteristic piece
- The Shoe, ballet suite
- Three Irish Pictures
- The Windjammer overture

== Death ==
Ansell died in Marlow, Buckinghamshire in 1948, aged 74.
