= Presbytery of Edinburgh and West Lothian =

Middle judicatory of the Church of Scotland

The Presbytery of Edinburgh and West Lothian is one of the thirteen presbyteries of the Church of Scotland. It was formed on 1 January 2022 from a merger of the Presbyteries of Edinburgh and West Lothian. The presbytery's formation came amid a wave of consolidation among Scottish presbyteries.

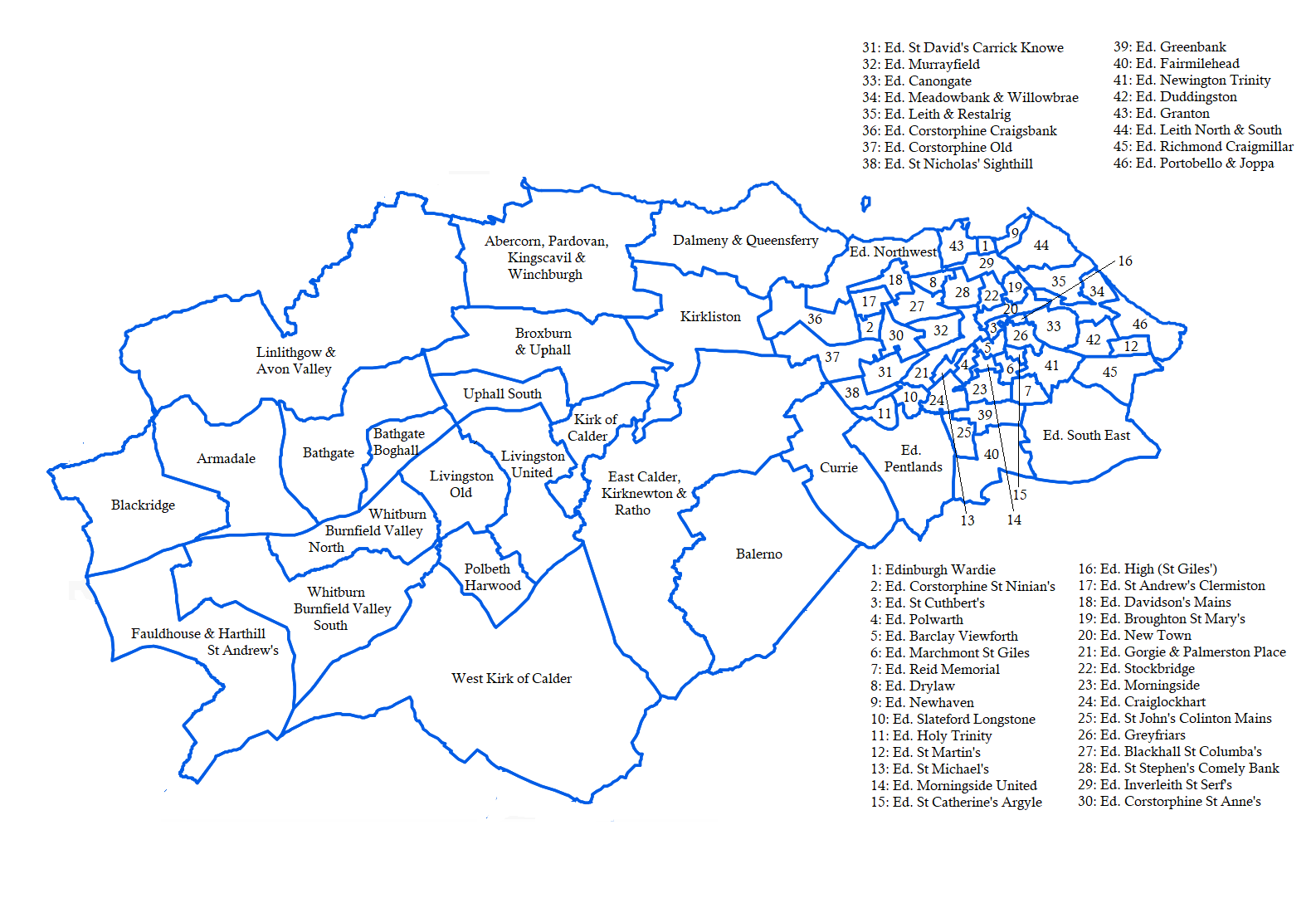
Edinburgh and West Lothian Presbytery parishes
