= Jeanie Deans (opera) =

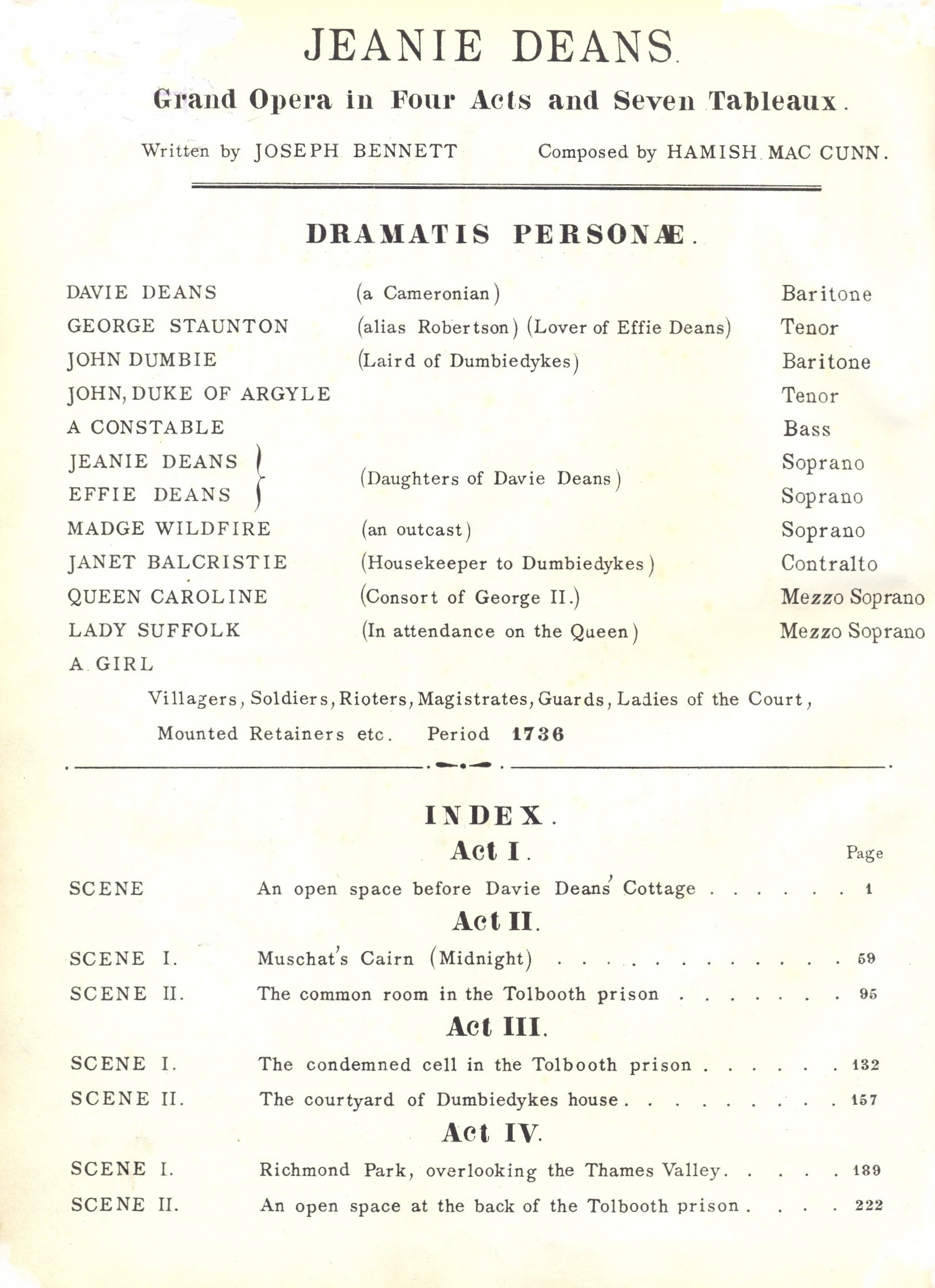
Cast list and contents of the opera

Jeanie Deans is an opera in four acts by Hamish MacCunn (1868–1916) set to a libretto by Joseph Bennett which is loosely based on Walter Scott's 1818 novel, The Heart of Midlothian and is named after its heroine, Jeanie Deans. The opera was commissioned by the Carl Rosa Opera Company and first produced at the Royal Lyceum Theatre in Edinburgh on 15 November 1894 to great acclaim.

The ending of the opera, in which Jeanie's sister, Effie Deans is freed from Tolbooth prison, is not in Scott's novel. The crowd scene in fact refers back to the beginning of the novel where the Porteous Riots are described. The plot of the opera, therefore, ends with the freeing of Effie, and the lives of Jeanie and her sister afterwards are not dealt with.

== Performance history ==
After its initial performances, it was given in London two years later to poor reviews, although Queen Victoria is said to have liked it. It was performed in repertory for over twenty years and has been revived in recent years. Additionally, the opera was revived again by Iain Whyte in 1938 at Edinburgh with some success. It was not seen in the theatre again until Glasgow Grand Opera Society staged it as their contribution to Festival Year 1951 with Joan Alexander in the title role.

A production by Opera West at the Gaiety Theatre, Ayr, in February 1986 used new orchestral material prepared thanks to a Scottish Arts Council grant (the older having been lost). The original scores of the opera are available in the Mitchell Library, Glasgow, and they form part of the MacCunn Collection in the Special Collections of Glasgow University Library.

== Recording ==
Excerpts from the opera were recorded in Govan Town Hall in June 1995 by the BBC Scottish Symphony Orchestra conducted by Martyn Brabbins with Janice Watson in the title role. The excerpts, along with other music by MacCunn, including The Land of the Mountain and the Flood, were released by Hyperion Records (CDA66815) the same year.
