= Barclay Viewforth Church =

Church in Edinburgh, Scotland

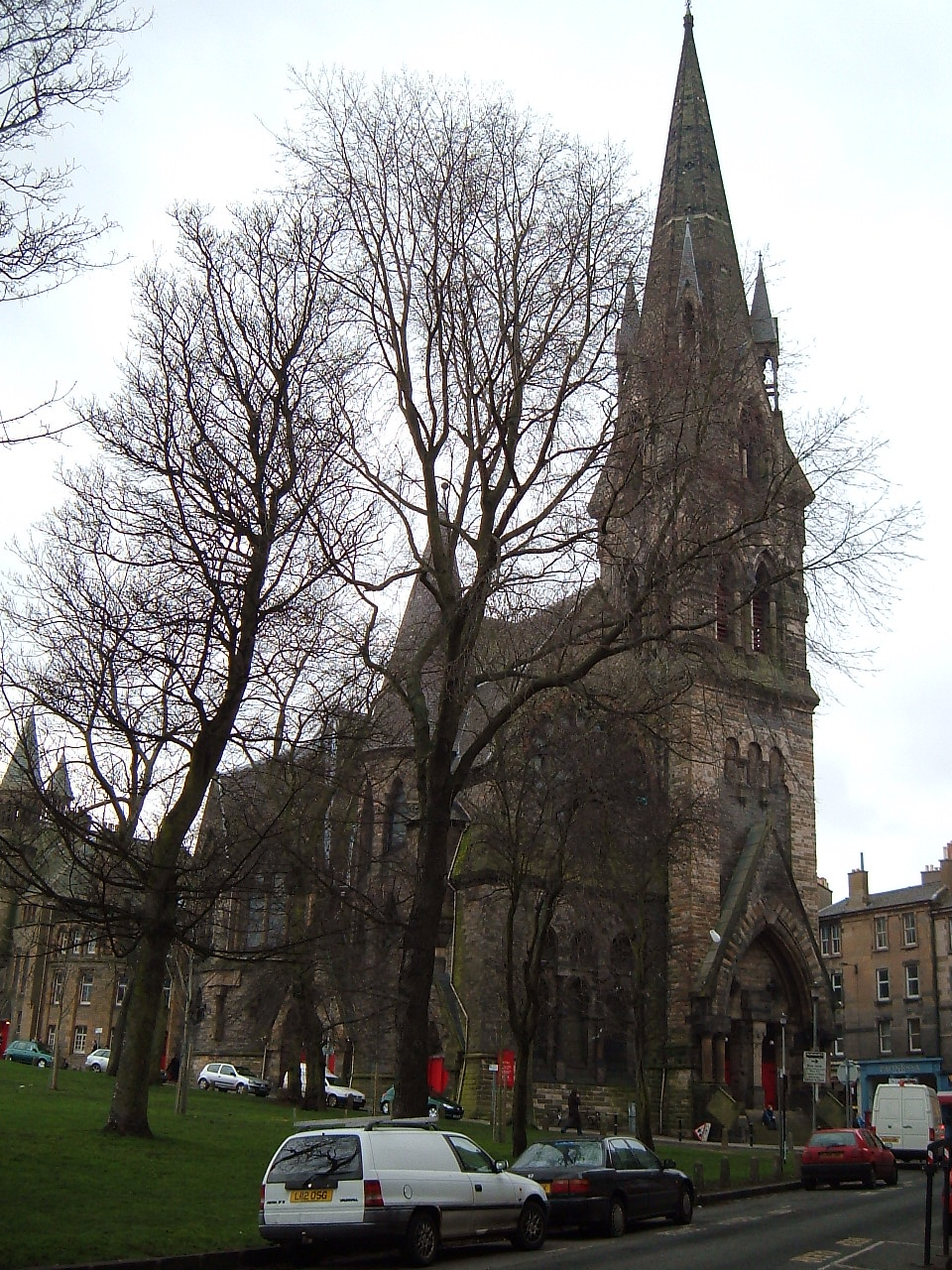
- Barclay Church
- Barclay Viewforth Church
- 55°56′26″N 3°12′12″W
- Denomination: Church of Scotland
- Website: Barclay Viewforth Church

Administration
- Parish: Barclay Viewforth

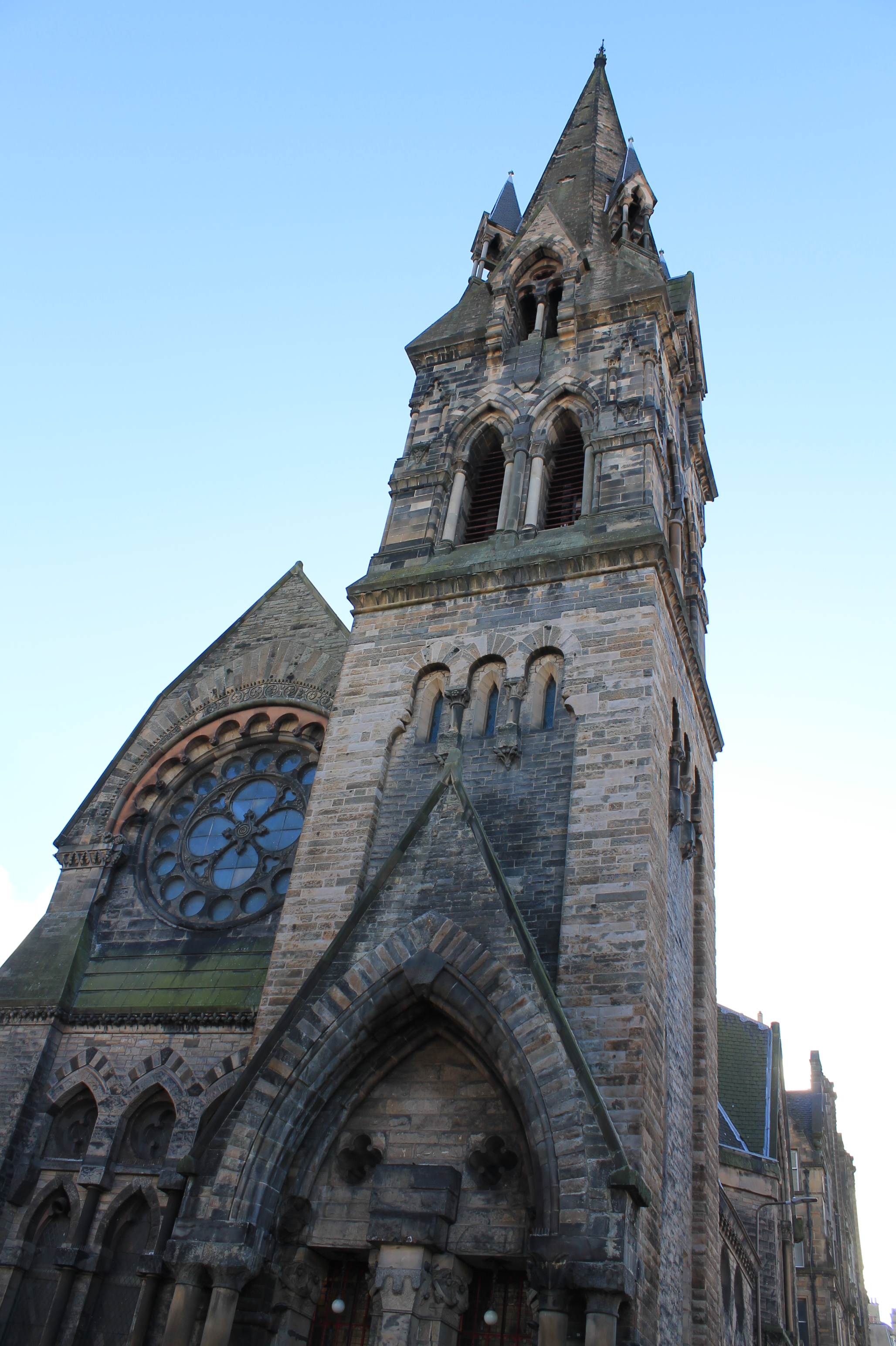
Barclay Bruntsfield Church spire, Edinburgh

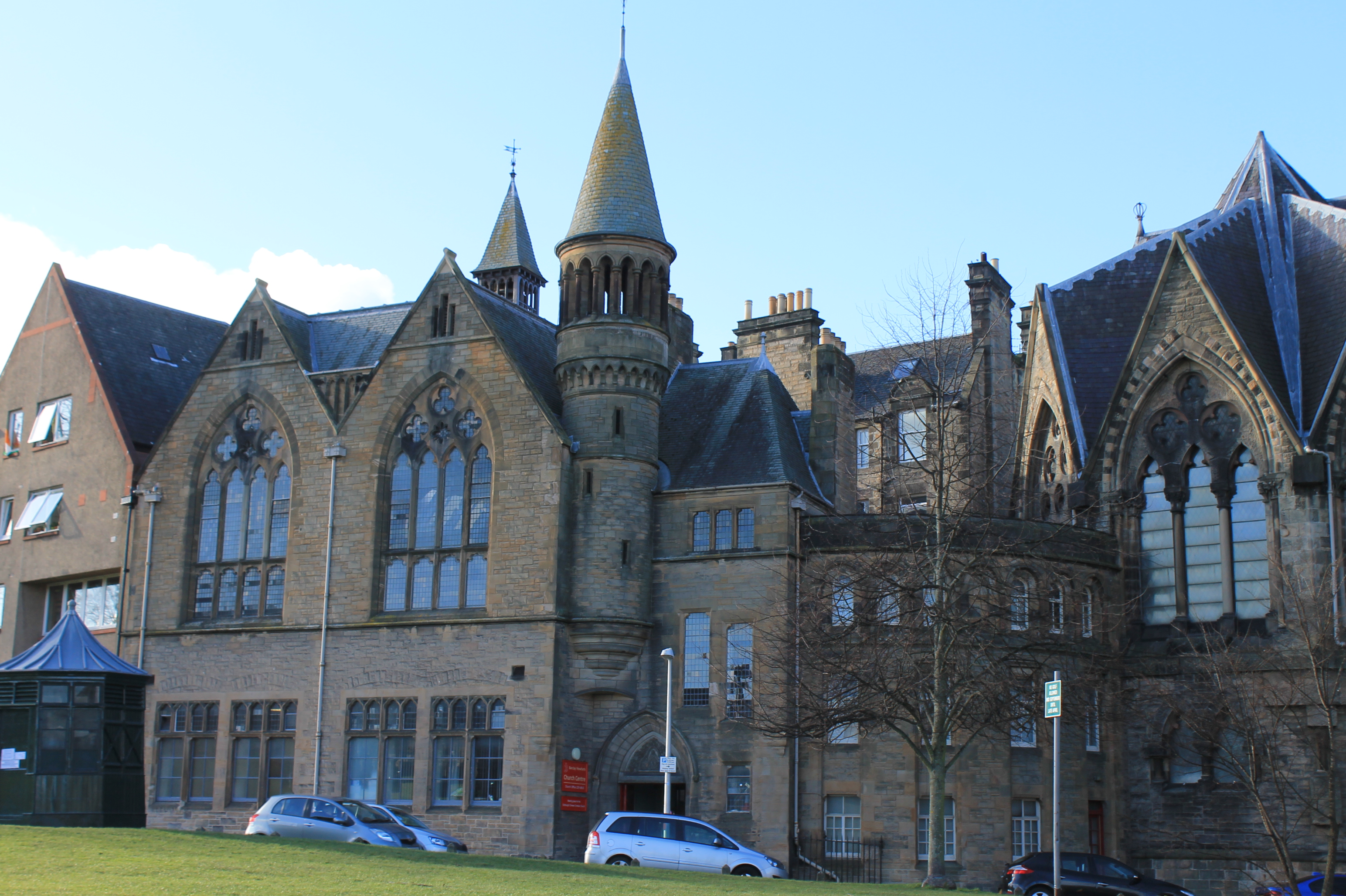
The church halls of Barclay Viewforth Church

Barclay Viewforth Church is a parish church of the Church of Scotland in the Presbytery of Edinburgh and West Lothian.

== History ==
Located at the border between the Bruntsfield and Tollcross areas of the city at the junction of Barclay Place and Wright's Houses, it was designed by Frederick Thomas Pilkington (1832–98) – starting in 1862 and completed in 1864 – mainly from a bequest of £10,000 left by Miss Mary Barclay of Carlton Terrace for the building of a church for the Free Church of Scotland. The first minister of the congregation was Rev Dr James Hood Wilson, DD, the first service of public worship being held on 23 December 1864. He served as Moderator of the General Assembly of the Free Church of Scotland in 1895. Wilson was replaced by Rev Dr William Macallum Clow in 1897.

The church remained part of the Free Church of Scotland until 1900 when the majority of the Free Church and the United Presbyterian Church of Scotland united to form the United Free Church of Scotland, and subsequently joined the Church of Scotland in 1929 when the majority of the United Free Church joined the Church of Scotland.

Barclay Church united with Bruntsfield Church (Leamington Terrace) in 1965. The Bruntsfield Church building is now used by an independent church and is known as Bruntsfield Evangelical Church. The church was renamed as "Barclay-Bruntsfield Church" until 1980 when it reverted to its original name after united with Chalmers-Lauriston Church (59-61 Lauriston Place). Chalmers-Lauriston Church was purchased by the City of Edinburgh Council and sold to the Arab Social League for use as a cultural centre, but has remained derelict until the late 2010s when it was converted to a Mosque. Barclay united with Viewforth Church in 2009. Other churches which have been subsumed into the parish of Barclay Viewforth through earlier unions include West Port Church. It is currently in a Parish Grouping with St Catherine's-Argyle Parish Church in Marchmont.

The Barclay Viewforth Church also hosts the Edinburgh Chinese Christian Church, a Chinese church consisting of a Cantonese-speaking congregation.

== Architecture ==
The Church, along with the Halls and Church Officer's House at the rear, are category A listed by Historic Scotland. The spire, which at 250 feet (76 m) high is a landmark in the city skyline, is one of the tallest church spires in Edinburgh.

Internally, the church has seating on the ground floor with two tiers of galleries in the heart shaped auditorium, which originally had seating for 1,200. The organ was installed in 1896 by R. Hope-Jones and has been twice rebuilt. The marble pulpit (also by Pilkington) holds a prominent location under the organ pipes with a central view over the nave.

The church halls to the east were skillfully added in 1891. They are designed by Sydney Mitchell in a complementary style to Pilkington's original and built in matching stone.

== Congregational history ==
- Barclay Viewforth Parish Church (2009-)
  - Barclay Parish Church (1980–2009)
    - Barclay Bruntsfield Parish Church (1967–80)
      - Barclay Parish Church (1929–67), formerly Barclay United Free Church (1900–29), formerly Barclay Free Church (1864–1900)
      - Bruntsfield Parish Church (1929–67), formerly Bruntsfield United Free Church (1900–29), formerly Viewforth United Presbyterian Church (1847–1900), formerly Viewforth Relief Church (1818–47)
    - Chalmers Lauriston Parish Church (1958–80)
      - Chalmers Parish Church (1929–58), formerly Chalmers United Free Church (1900–29), formerly Chalmers' Territorial Free Church (c1880-1900), formerly West Port Free Church (1847-c1880)
      - Lauriston Parish Church (1929–58), formerly Lauriston Place United Free Church (1900–29), formerly Lauriston Place United Presbyterian Church (1859–1900), formerly Portsburgh United Presbyterian Church (1847–59), formerly Portsburgh United Secession Church (1820–47), formerly Portsburgh Burgher Church (1791–1820)
  - Viewforth Parish Church (1973–2009)
    - St David's Viewforth Parish Church (1929–73), formerly St David's Parish Church (1836–1929), formerly Gardner Crescent Chapel (1831–36)
    - Viewforth St Oswald's Parish Church (1957–73)
      - Viewforth Parish Church (1929–57), formerly Viewforth United Free Church (1900–29), formerly Viewforth Free Church (1872–1900)
      - St Oswald's Parish Church (1907–57), formerly St Mark's Chapel (1890–1907)

== See also ==
- List of Church of Scotland parishes
- List of tallest buildings and structures in Edinburgh
