= Learmont Drysdale =

Scottish composer

Learmont Drysdale (full name George John Learmont Drysdale; 3 October 1866 – 18 June 1909) was a Scottish composer. During a short career he wrote music inspired by Scotland, particularly the Scottish Borders; this included orchestral music, choral music and songs.

== Early life ==
Drysdale was born in Edinburgh on 3 October 1866, the youngest of three children of Andrew Drysdale, a builder, and his wife Jane Elspeth Learmont, who was descended from the Border poet Thomas the Rhymer. Educated at the Royal High School, Edinburgh, he afterwards studied architecture, but abandoned it in 1887; he moved to London, and became sub-organist at All Saints' Church in Kensington. He entered the Royal Academy of Music in London, where he studied composition with Frederick Corder and piano with Wilhelm Kuhe.

He had a brilliant career as a student, winning in 1891 the academy's highest honour in composition, the Charles Lucas medal, with Overture to a Comedy. During this period he appeared frequently as a solo pianist at the students' concerts, and wrote several works which brought high praise.

One of these, performed at a students' concert in 1889, was reviewed: "A ballade for orchestra, The Spirit of the Glen, from the pen of a young Scotsman, Mr. Learmont Drysdale, was also included, and proved to be a work which augurs extremely well for its composer's future. Its themes are fresh and melodious, its orchestration rich and vivid, and it is, as a whole, plentifully imaginative. It was well played, and received with great and justifiable warmth."

Other works from this period were an orchestral prelude Thomas the Rhymer (1890), and a dramatic scena for soprano and orchestra The Lay of Thora (1891). In 1891 a picturesque overture, Tam o' Shanter, written within a week, gained the prize of thirty guineas offered by the Glasgow Society of Musicians for the best concert overture. In 1921 the work was posthumously awarded a Carnegie Award and published.

After a disagreement with the principal, Alexander Mackenzie, he left the Royal Academy of Music in 1892 without graduating.

== Development of career ==
Drysdale moved to Edinburgh. In 1894 a dramatic cantata The Kelpie, was performed there, and in the same year the Borders-inspired overture Herondean was performed in London.

A mystic musical play, The Plague, created a strong impression when produced in Edinburgh in 1896. Two years later, a romantic light opera, The Red Spider, with libretto by Sabine Baring-Gould, was enthusiastically received when first produced at Plymouth, and toured the provinces for twenty weeks.

His Border Romance, an orchestral poem composed at Henry Wood's request, was given at Queen's Hall, London, in 1904. From 1904 to 1905 he was theoretical master at the Athenæum School of Music, Glasgow; later he was conductor of the Glasgow Select Choir, for which he wrote, among other things, the choral ballade Barbara Allan. In 1905 he composed the incidental music for Euripides' Hippolytus, staged in Glasgow, and a dramatic cantata, Tamlane.

With appropriate insight, Drysdale set Scots lyrics and arranged folk-songs. Many arrangements are included in the Dunedin Collection of Scots Songs (1908), which he edited. In 1907 he collaborated with the Duke of Argyll in The Scottish Tribute to France, for chorus and orchestra; it remained unperformed at his death.

He died in Edinburgh of pneumonia, on 18 June 1909, and was buried in Peebles. He was unmarried.

== Works left at his death ==
At his death Drysdale had almost finished a grand opera, provisionally entitled Fionn and Tera, to a libretto by the Duke of Argyll; the orchestration was completed by David Stephen. Many other works were left in manuscript, including The Oracle and other light operas, a romantic opera, Flora Macdonald, several cantatas, orchestral, piano and violin pieces, and songs. His archive is in Glasgow University Library.
