= Hamish MacCunn =

Scottish composer, conductor and teacher (1868–1916)

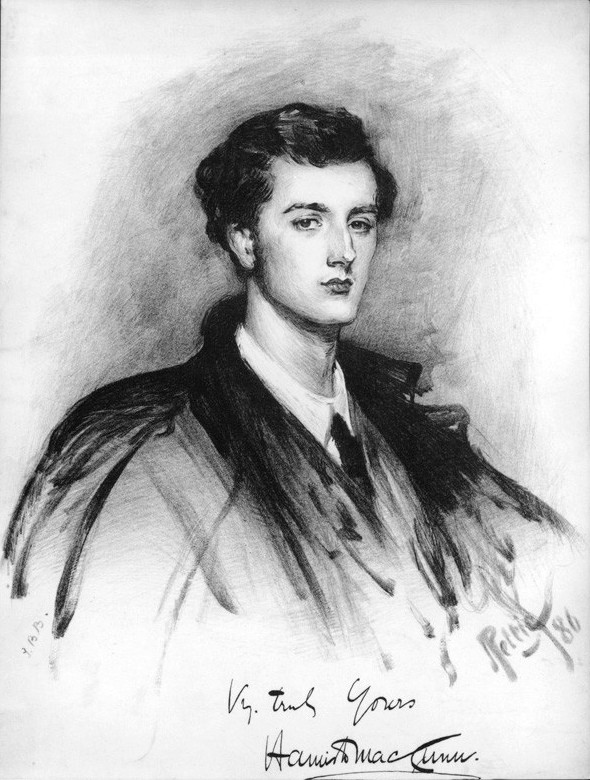
- 1889 portrait by John Pettie
- Born: 22 March 1868; Greenock, Scotland
- Died: 2 August 1916 (aged 48); London
- Occupations: Composer, conductor, teacher

Hamish MacCunn, né James MacCunn (22 March 1868 – 2 August 1916) was a Scottish composer, conductor and teacher.

He was one of the first students of the newly founded Royal College of Music in London, and quickly made a mark. As a composer he achieved early success with his orchestral piece The Land of the Mountain and the Flood (1887), and, later, his first opera, Jeanie Deans (1894). His subsequent compositions did not match those two successes, and although he continued to compose throughout his life, he became best known as a conductor and teacher. He held teaching appointments at the Royal Academy of Music and the Guildhall School of Music.

As a conductor MacCunn served as musical director to the Carl Rosa, Moody-Manners and D'Oyly Carte opera companies, and worked with Thomas Beecham in the latter's London opera seasons in 1910 and 1915 and on tour.

== Life and career ==
=== Early years ===
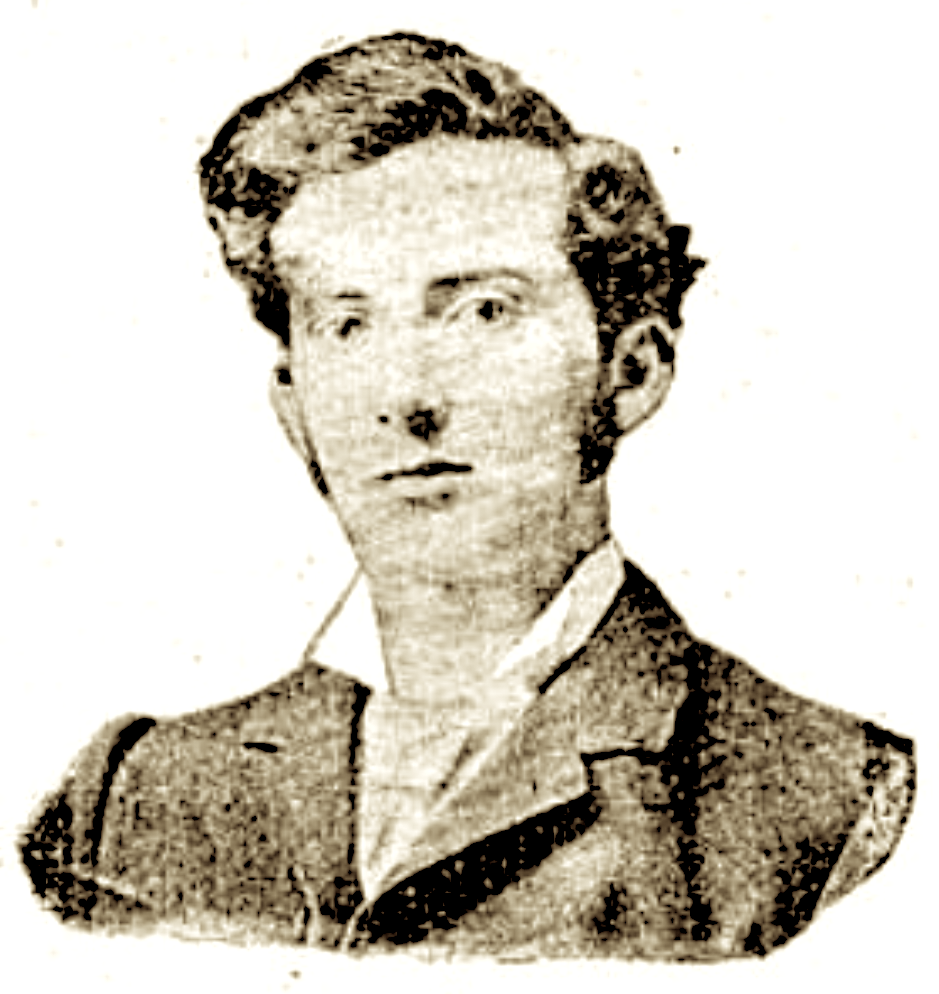
Hamish MacCunn in 1890.

James MacCunn was born in Greenock, Scotland, the second son of James MacCunn and his wife Barbara, née Neill. It was a musical household: MacCunn senior, a prosperous shipowner by profession, was an amateur cellist; his wife, a former pupil of Sir William Sterndale Bennett, sang and played the piano. The parents encouraged the musical development of their second son, who, alongside his general education at the Greenock Academy and elsewhere, received private lessons from local teachers in violin, piano, organ, harmony and composition. When he was eight the family spent a full season in London, where the boy was allowed to attend all August Manns's many concerts at the Crystal Palace. In 1883, at the age of fifteen, he won a scholarship to the newly established Royal College of Music (RCM) in London.

At the RCM MacCunn studied piano with Franklin Taylor, viola with Alfred Gibson and composition with Hubert Parry and Charles Villiers Stanford. While a student he had substantial compositions premiered: the cantata The Moss Rose, performed at the RCM in 1884, and the overture Cior Mhor, which was given by Manns in a concert at the Crystal Palace in October 1885. In 1885 MacCunn adopted the first name Hamish, a Gaelic version of the name James.

MacCunn resigned the scholarship in 1886 in what the music critic John Purser describes as "a fit of pique" because he felt he was not receiving the social status due to him. He left the RCM without taking a degree. Shortly afterwards he had a success with his concert overture The Land of the Mountain and the Flood, premiered at the Crystal Palace in 1887. The Musical Times commented, "The work – which is spirited and bold in conception and brilliantly scored – was finely played and enthusiastically received". Bernard Shaw, in his capacity as a music critic, called it "a charming Scotch overture that carries you over the hills and far away".

Some of the composer's songs and other works were premiered at the house of the painter John Pettie, whose daughter Alison married MacCunn in June 1889. They had one child, Fergus, who became a soldier. Pettie portrayed MacCunn in his popular painting Two Strings to her Bow (1887). From 1888 to 1894 MacCunn was professor of harmony at the RCM's older rival the Royal Academy of Music and also took private pupils.

=== Opera and conducting ===
In 1889 the opera manager Carl Rosa commissioned MacCunn to write a work for the Carl Rosa Opera Company, and in 1891 MacCunn contracted to write an opera for Richard D'Oyly Carte's new Royal English Opera House. The work for Carte was to be based on H. Rider Haggard's 1888 novel Cleopatra, but the opera was never finished, and MacCunn's failure to provide a work to continue Carte's seasons (together with similar failures by two other British composers) led to the closure of the opera house and the abandonment of Carte's English opera enterprise. (Note: The other composers whose promised works did not materialise were Frederic Cowen and Arthur Thomas.)

MacCunn, right, with Edward German, 1902

The commission for Rosa was eventually completed, although not produced until after the impresario's death. This opera was Jeanie Deans, based on Walter Scott's The Heart of Midlothian and first produced in 1894 in Edinburgh, conducted by the composer. It was a considerable success, despite what The Times called "the dubious advantage" of a libretto by Joseph Bennett. In 1896 Jeanie Deans received a London performance, and MacCunn composed another opera, Diarmid and Ghrine. The following year Manns performed MacCunn's new orchestral suite, Highland Memories, and the Carl Rosa company presented Diarmid and Ghrine at the Royal Opera House.

From the premiere of Jeanie Deans onward, MacCunn became associated with British opera companies as a conductor. For two seasons from 1898 he was musical director of the Carl Rosa company, conducting, among much else, the first English-language productions of Wagner's Tristan und Isolde and Siegfried. In 1900 he signed a two-year contract as conductor of the Moody-Manners company, conducting a wide repertoire of operas, including Lohengrin, Tannhäuser, Carmen, La Juive, The Flying Dutchman, Tristan and Isolde and Martha. In 1902 he was appointed musical director of the D'Oyly Carte Opera Company at the Savoy Theatre, for the first production of Edward German's Merrie England, and the following year German's A Princess of Kensington. When the Savoy company dispersed thereafter, MacCunn, in the words of The Times, "had to accept work in various 'musical comedy' productions, which did not contribute to his artistic advancement".

In 1910 MacCunn conducted Hansel and Gretel in Thomas Beecham's opera season at His Majesty's Theatre, and took over from Beecham in conducting The Tales of Hoffmann on tour. In 1915 he conducted The Tales of Hoffmann and Faust in Beecham's season at the Shaftesbury Theatre.

From 1912 onwards MacCunn took opera classes at the Guildhall School of Music and continued to teach privately. Conducting and teaching took up much of his time, and he composed less in his later years. His students in music composition included John Ansell, Liza Lehmann, and Gerrit Smith. His works written after 1900 include The Masque of War and Peace (1900) produced at Her Majesty's Theatre, another opera – The Golden Girl – and a piece for chorus and orchestra, The Wreck of the Hesperus (both 1905). In 1908 his Pageant of Darkness and Light was performed in London.

MacCunn became ill with throat cancer in 1916 and died at his home in St John's Wood, London on 2 August 1916, aged forty-eight, survived by his widow and son. His son was Captain Fergus MacCunn.

== Works ==
MacCunn's compositions include:

=== Orchestral ===
- 1883 – Fantasia Overture (unfinished)
- 1885 – Cior Mhor, overture (fp. The Crystal Palace, London, 27 October 1885)
- 1886–87 – The Land of the Mountain and the Flood, concert overture, Op. 3 (fp. Crystal Palace, London, 5 November 1887)
- 1887 – The Ship o' the Fiend, ballad, Op. 5 (fp. St James's Hall, London, 21 February 1888); based on the traditional ballad "The Daemon Lover"
- 1888 – The Dowie Dens o' Yarrow, ballad, Op. 6 (fp. Crystal Palace, London, 13 October 1888)
- 1896 – Highland Memories, suite, Op. 30 (fp. Crystal Palace, London, 13 March 1897)
- 1900–09 – Four Dances

=== Choral and vocal ===
- 1882–84 – The Moss Rose, cantata (fp. Royal Albert Hall [West Theatre], London, 10 December 1885)
- 1887 – Lord Ullin's Daughter, cantata (fp. Crystal Palace, London, 18 February 1888)
- 1886–88 – Bonny Kilmeny, cantata, Op. 2 (fp. Queens Street Hall, Edinburgh, 13 December 1888)
- 1888 – The Lay of the Last Minstrel, cantata, Op. 7 (fp. City Hall, Glasgow, 18 December 1888)
- 1889 – The Cameronian's Dream, cantata, Op. 10 (fp. Queens Street Hall, Edinburgh, 27 January 1890)
- 1890 – Psalm VIII, for chorus and organ (fp. 2nd International Industrial Exhibition, Meggetland, Edinburgh, 1 May 1890)
- 1891 – Queen Hynde of Caledon, cantata, Op. 13 (fp. City Hall, Glasgow, 28 January 1892)
- 1900 – The Masque of War and Peace, for soloists, chorus and orchestra (fp. Her Majesty's Theatre, London, 13 February 1900)
- 1905 – The Wreck of the Hesperus, cantata (fp. London Coliseum, 28 August 1905)
- 1908 – The Pageant of Darkness and Light, for soloists, chorus and orchestra (fp. Agricultural Hall, London, 4 June 1908)
- 1912 – Livingstone the Pilgrim, for soli, chorus and or organ (fp. Royal Albert Hall, London, 19 March 1913)
- 1896–1913 – Four Scottish Traditional Border Ballads ("Kinmont Willie"; "The Jolly Goshawk"; "Lamkin"; "The Death of Parcy Reed"), for chorus and orchestra (Nos. 1–3 fp. Victoria Hall, Sheffield, 19 April 1921; No. 4 fp. Queen's Hall, London, 25 March 1925)

=== Operatic ===
- 1894 – Jeanie Deans, opera (fp. Royal Lyceum Theatre, Edinburgh, 15 November 1894)
- 1897 – Diarmid, opera, Op. 34 (fp. Covent Garden Theatre, London, 23 October 1897)
- 1904 – Prue, comic opera (unfinished)
- 1905 – The Golden Girl, light opera (fp. Prince of Wales Theatre, Birmingham, 5 August 1905)
- Breast of Light, Op. 36 (unfinished)

== Notes, references and sources ==
=== Sources ===
- Scott, Stuart (2002). Hamish MacCunn. Sale: S. C. Scott. ISBN 978-0-9532512-2-3.
- Seeley, Paul (2019). Richard D'Oyly Carte. London: Routledge. ISBN 978-1-351-04589-6.
- Rollins, Cyril; R. John Witts (1962). The D'Oyly Carte Opera Company in Gilbert and Sullivan Operas: A Record of Productions, 1875–1961. London: Michael Joseph. OCLC 504581419.
- Shaw, Bernard (1981). Shaw's Music: The Complete Musical Criticism of Bernard Shaw. Vol. 1 (1876–1890). London: Bodley Head. ISBN 978-0-370-30247-8.
