= The Land of the Mountain and the Flood =

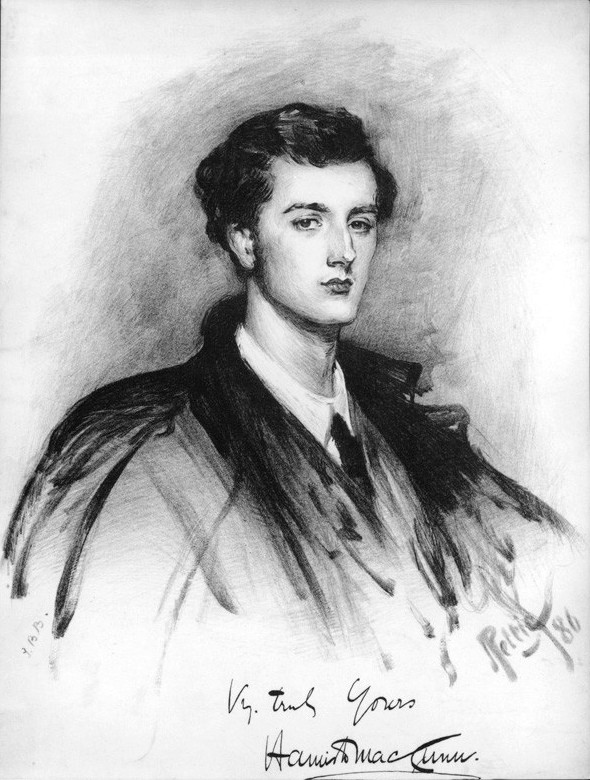
1889 portrait of Hamish MacCunn

The Land of the Mountain and the Flood is a concert overture for orchestra, composed by Hamish MacCunn in 1887 and first performed at the Crystal Palace on 5 November of that year. The title is taken from Scott's The Lay of the Last Minstrel, canto vi, stanza 2:

O Caledonia! stern and wild,
Meet nurse for a poetic child!
Land of the heath and shaggy wood,
Land of the mountain and the flood,
Land of my sires! what mortal hand
Can e'er untie the filial band
That knits me to thy rugged strand!

After the premiere The Musical Times commented, "The work – which is spirited and bold in conception and brilliantly scored – was finely played and enthusiastically received". After an 1890 performance at the Crystal Palace, Bernard Shaw wrote of the piece:

Mr MacCunn's Land of the Mountain and the Flood, a charming Scotch overture that carries you over the hills and far away, was much applauded. I object, by the bye, to the "working out" section, which Mr MacCunn would never have written if his tutors had not put it into his head. I know a lady who keeps a typewriting establishment. Under my advice she is completing arrangements for supplying middle sections and recapitulations for overtures and symphonies at twopence a bar, on being supplied with the first section and coda.

In 1968, the overture came to renewed attention when EMI included it on an LP "Music of the Four Countries" (ASD 2400), played by the Scottish National Orchestra conducted by Alexander Gibson. It gained wider familiarity by being used from 1973 to 1976 as the theme for the BBC television series Sutherland's Law.

== Recordings ==
Orchestra	Conductor	First issue	Ref
Scottish National	Alexander Gibson	1968	
Royal Scottish National	Sir Alexander Gibson	1985	
Royal Liverpool Philharmonic	Grant Llewellyn	1993	
BBC Scottish Symphony	Martyn Brabbins	1995	
Royal Ballet Sinfonia	John Wilson	1999	

== Sources ==
Shaw, Bernard (1981). Shaw's Music: The Complete Musical Criticism of Bernard Shaw. Vol. 1 (1876–1890). London: Bodley Head. ISBN 978-0-370-30247-8.
