= Arabella Huntington =

American philanthropist (1850/1 - 1924)

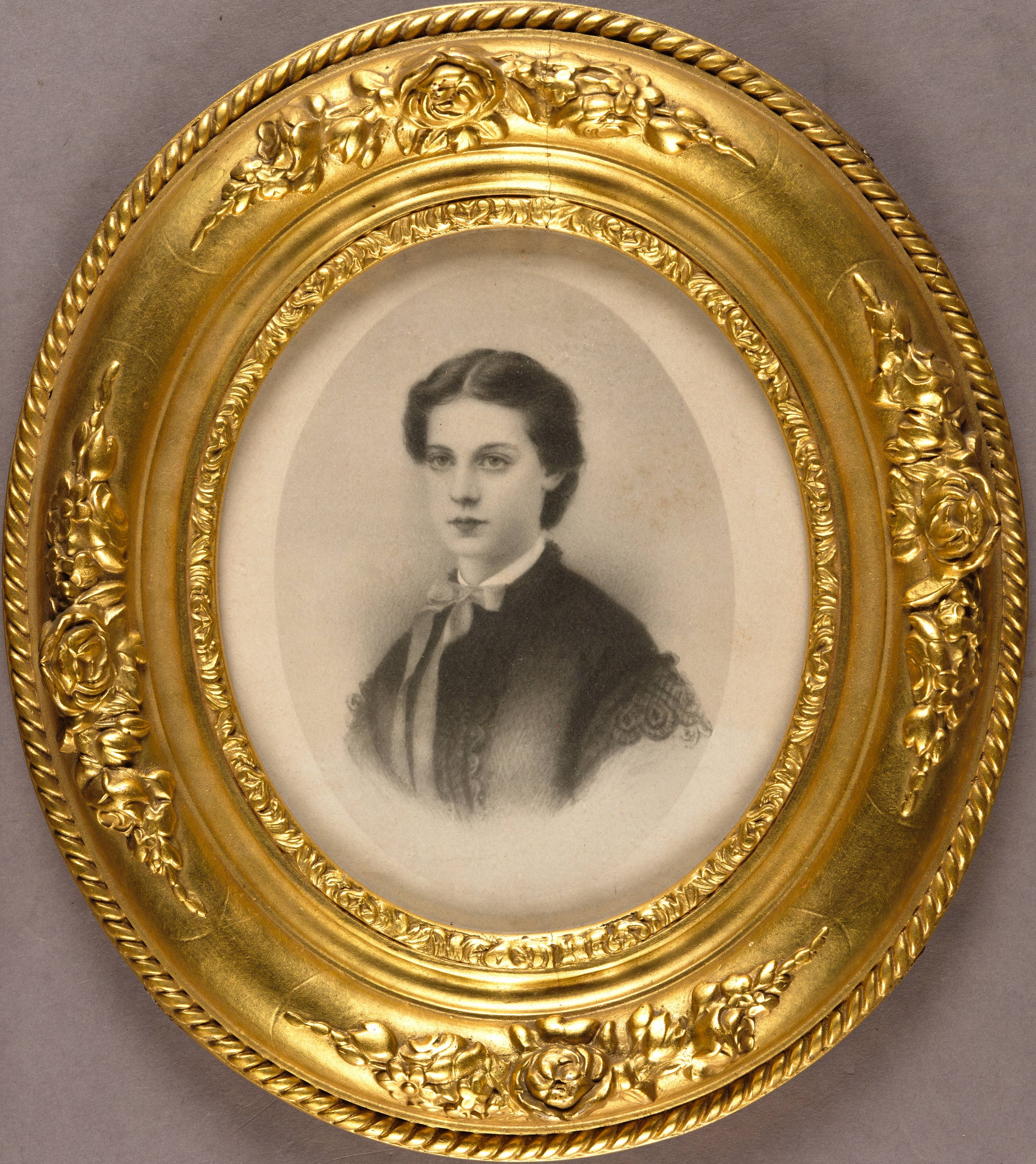
- Portrait of Huntington, circa 1870
- Born: Arabella Duval Yarrington c. 1850/1851; Richmond, Virginia, U.S.
- Died: September 16, 1924 (age 72–74); New York City, U.S.
- Burial place: Huntington Library's Mausoleum
- Other name: Arabella Duval Yarrington "Bell" Huntington
- Occupation: Philanthropist
- Known for: Second wife of Collis P. Huntington, and second wife of Henry E. Huntington
- Spouses: Collis Potter Huntington (m. 1884; died 1900) Henry E. Huntington (m. 1913)
- Children: Archer Milton Huntington (son)
- Relatives: Anna Hyatt Huntington (daughter-in-law)

Arabella Duval Huntington (née Yarrington; c. 1850/1851 – September 16, 1924) was an American philanthropist and once known as the richest woman in the country, as a result of inheritances she received upon the deaths of her husbands. She was the force behind the art collection that is housed at the Huntington Library in California.

She was the second wife of Collis P. Huntington, an American railway tycoon and industrialist. After his death, she married his nephew, Henry E. Huntington, also a railway magnate, and founder of the Huntington Library, Art Museum and Botanical Gardens, in San Marino, California.

== Biography ==
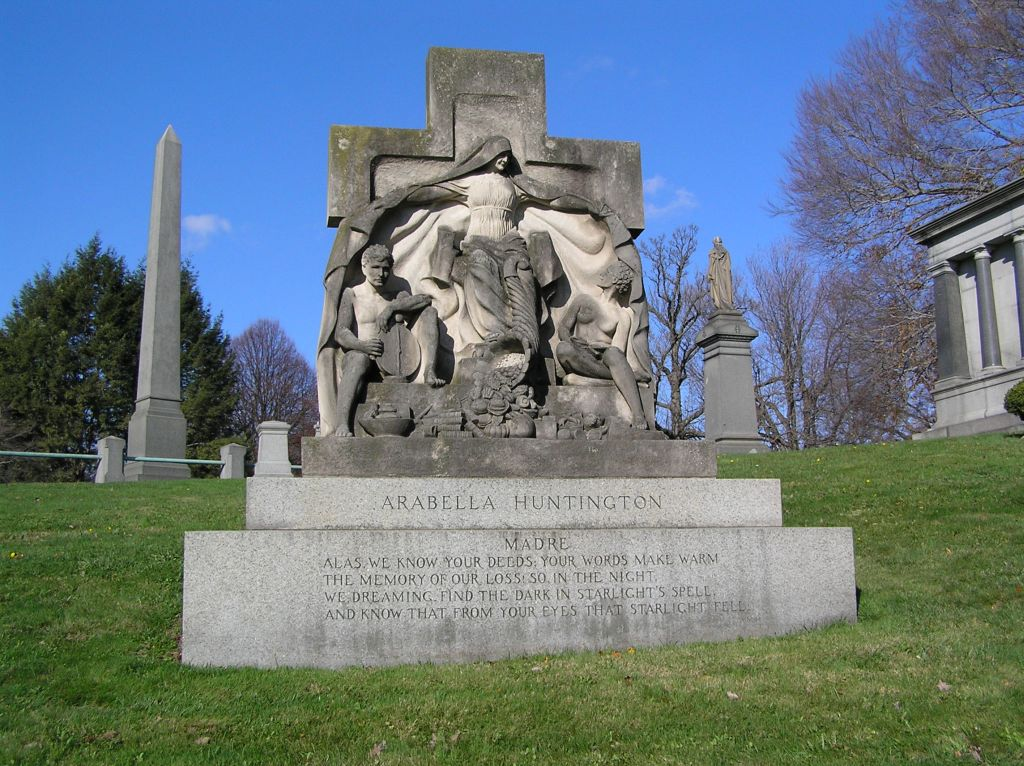
The monument of Arabella Huntington in Woodlawn Cemetery, Bronx, NY

Information about her early life is scarce. She was born Arabella Duval Yarrington, in 1850 or 1851, probably in Richmond, Virginia (see Wark, p. 312). For the 1921 passenger list for the ship Aquitania, sailing from Cherbourg to New York, Arabella Huntington said she was born in Mobile, Alabama, on February 9, 1851. During her second marriage, in 1913 in Paris, she said she was born in Union Springs, Alabama, on June 1, 1857.

She moved north with a Mr. Worsham, also of Virginia, said to be married with children. He died shortly after they were married, leaving her with their young son, Archer, who was born in 1870. (Some sources have suggested that the pair were never married and that she was Worsham's mistress). In 1877, she purchased some property in New York, which was later sold to John D. Rockefeller.

In New York, she worked to care for the ailing wife of Collis P. Huntington, a wealthy industrialist and railway magnate whom she may have met in Richmond. Collis Huntington's wife died in 1884. In the same year, Collis Huntington married Arabella in San Francisco, California.

After they married, Collis Huntington legally adopted Archer, who, by then, was 14 years old. (It has been suggested that Collis was Archer's biological father.).

When Collis Huntington died in 1900, both Arabella and Archer inherited money from him. She is said to have inherited more than $50 million.

In 1913, she married Henry E. Huntington, a nephew of her late husband, who was also a railway magnate and influential in the Los Angeles area. She was his second wife. The couple were together until her death in 1924. Both are buried on the grounds of the Huntington Library, Art Museum and Botanical Gardens in San Marino, California.

== Huntington Fund for Cancer Research ==
In 1902, Huntington gave $100,000 to General Memorial Hospital, in memory of her husband, to establish the first cancer research fund in the country, the Huntington Fund for Cancer Research. The hospital developed, as the Memorial Sloan Kettering Cancer Center in New York.

A memorial to Arabella Huntington was installed in the west wing of the Huntington Library building. It was dedicated in 1927, the year of Henry's death.

== Art collection ==
Throughout her life, Huntington collected art, jewelry, antiques, and other luxury items. Her particular interests were in Old Masters, Medieval, and Renaissance devotional images, and Louis XIV–Louis XV furniture and decorative arts.

At her death, her entire fortune and collections went to her son, Archer Huntington. He donated many of her paintings to the Metropolitan Museum of Art (MET), in New York City. These included two Rembrandts, a Vermeer, and several hundred other paintings, most of which had belonged to her husband, Collis. The majority of the contents of her primary residence on W. 57th St., including most of the artwork, was sent to auction. Many of the family's other belongings, including clothing, furniture, tapestries, and porcelain, were bequeathed to other institutions including Yale University in New Haven, Connecticut, and the California Palace of the Legion of Honor art museum in San Francisco.

Some items are held within the collections of the Huntington Library. These were selected for an exhibition about Arabella Huntington in the spring of 2006, which was entitled The Belle of San Marino. Only the small collection of Medieval and Renaissance paintings at the Huntington Library were in Arabella's own private collection. Henry Huntington purchased these, after her death from an auction set up by her son, Archer.

The remainder of the objects in the 'Arabella Memorial Collection' at the Huntington were purchased, after her death by Henry Huntington. They represent the types of objects she formerly owned but are not the objects, themselves.

== Personal life ==
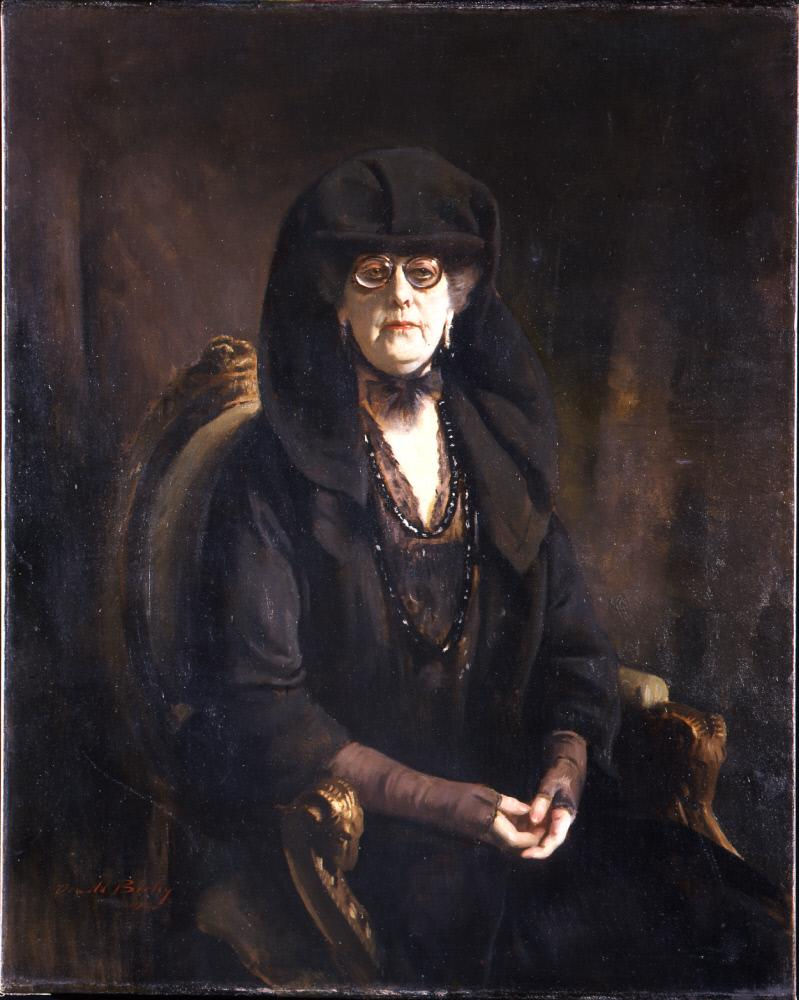
Oswald Birley - Mrs. Henry E. Huntington (Arabella Duvall Yarrow Huntington Huntington) - A2769 - Hispanic Society of America

=== Arts and culture ===
Arabella took voice lessons from celebrated voice teacher, Emilio Belari, whose other pupils included the famed soprano Lillian Nordica and other society women of New York, including Louise Whitfield Carnegie. Her son, Archer M. Huntington, shared her love for art and culture and was a patron of museums. He was also one of the world's leading experts on Spanish poetry and was the founder of the Hispanic Society of America in New York City.

=== Death ===
Arabella Huntington died in New York City on September 16, 1924. She is interred in the Huntington Library's Mausoleum in San Marino, California. Her husband, Henry Huntington, was interred there, three years later, following his death.
