= Alice Esty =

Alice Esty may refer to:

- Alice May Esty (1864–1935), American-born British operatic soprano
- Alice Swanson Esty (1904–2000), American soprano and patron who commissioned music
