= Blanche Cole =

English soprano (1851–1888)

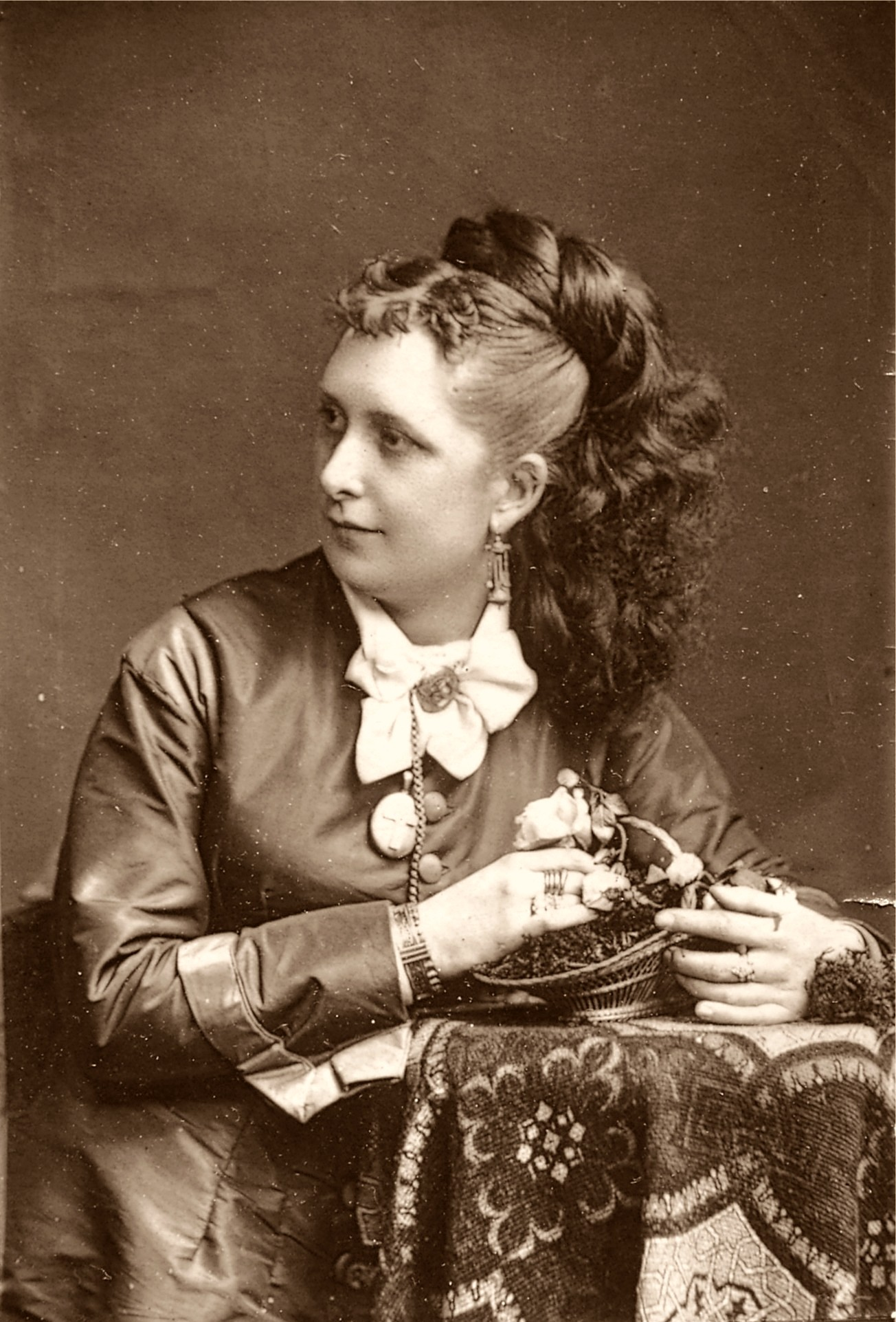
Blanche Cole

Blanche Cole (1851 – 31 August 1888) was an English soprano. Showing promise as a child, Cole went on to have a successful operatic career, during which she sang 21 roles in English versions of operas in London and the British provinces. She died at the age of 37.

== Early years ==
Cole was born in Portsmouth, England, to a musical family. In 1858, at the age of seven, she took part in a concert in Glasgow, winning a favourable review from The Glasgow Herald. In 1860 she took part in a concert at London's St. James's Hall presented by the Vocal Association. According to The Musical Times, "the delightful silvery quality of her voice brought her prominently to the front... her name has been amongst the first of English operatic singers".

In 1867, Cole sang Zerlina in Fra Diavolo, Amina in La sonnambula, and Marguerite in Faust with Rosenthal's English Opera Company. In 1868, she sang Oscar in Un ballo in maschera at the Theatre Royal in Cork and Leonora in Il trovatore in London, in a production conducted by Meyer Lutz. The same year, she married Sidney Naylor, a noted organist and accompanist of the day. He acted as conductor to her company in 1875 in William Vincent Wallace's Lurline.

== Later years ==
In 1869, Cole was praised by The Times for her singing in Acis and Galatea in London and made her debut at the Crystal Palace as Amina in Bellini's La sonnambula with George Perren and Richard Temple, conducted by August Manns. In 1872, she sang the role of Maid Marian in a concert version of G. A. Macfarren's opera Robin Hood at the Crystal Palace. The Musical Standard wrote of her "sweet cultivated voice" and opined that "the artistic intelligence which she brings to her work renders her performance very enjoyable, and thoroughly enlists the sympathies of the audience". She appeared at the Adelphi Theatre with the Carl Rosa Opera Company in 1878 as Senta in The Flying Dutchman and as the Countess in The Marriage of Figaro. From time to time she presented her own opera company. On other occasions she appeared under the management of Richard Temple with Rose Hersee's company in Don Pasquale and Il trovatore. She also appeared with much success as Mary Wolf in Balfe's opera The Puritan's Daughter, produced by the Carl Rosa Company

In 1887 she sang Donna Anna in Don Giovanni. In 1888, The Pall Mall Gazette commented that her fine voice seemed entirely to pervade the great space of the Albert Hall with its piercing and sympathetic quality. The Musical Times wrote: "She was everywhere known for her graceful acting, which, apart even from the careful manipulation of her pure and beautiful voice, had always made her a favourite with opera-goers." During her career, Cole sang 21 roles.

Cole died of dropsy at age 37 at her London home.

== Sources ==
- Aldephi Theatre Calendar 1806 - 1900
- Baker, Theodore, A Biographical Dictionary of Musicians, Read Books, 2008, p. 416. ISBN 1-4437-2847-0
- The Musical World, 11 January 1868, p. 21.
- Sherson, Erroll, London's lost theatres of the nineteenth century, Ayer Publishing, 1925, p. 230. ISBN 0-405-08969-4
