= Euphrosyne Parepa-Rosa =

British operatic soprano

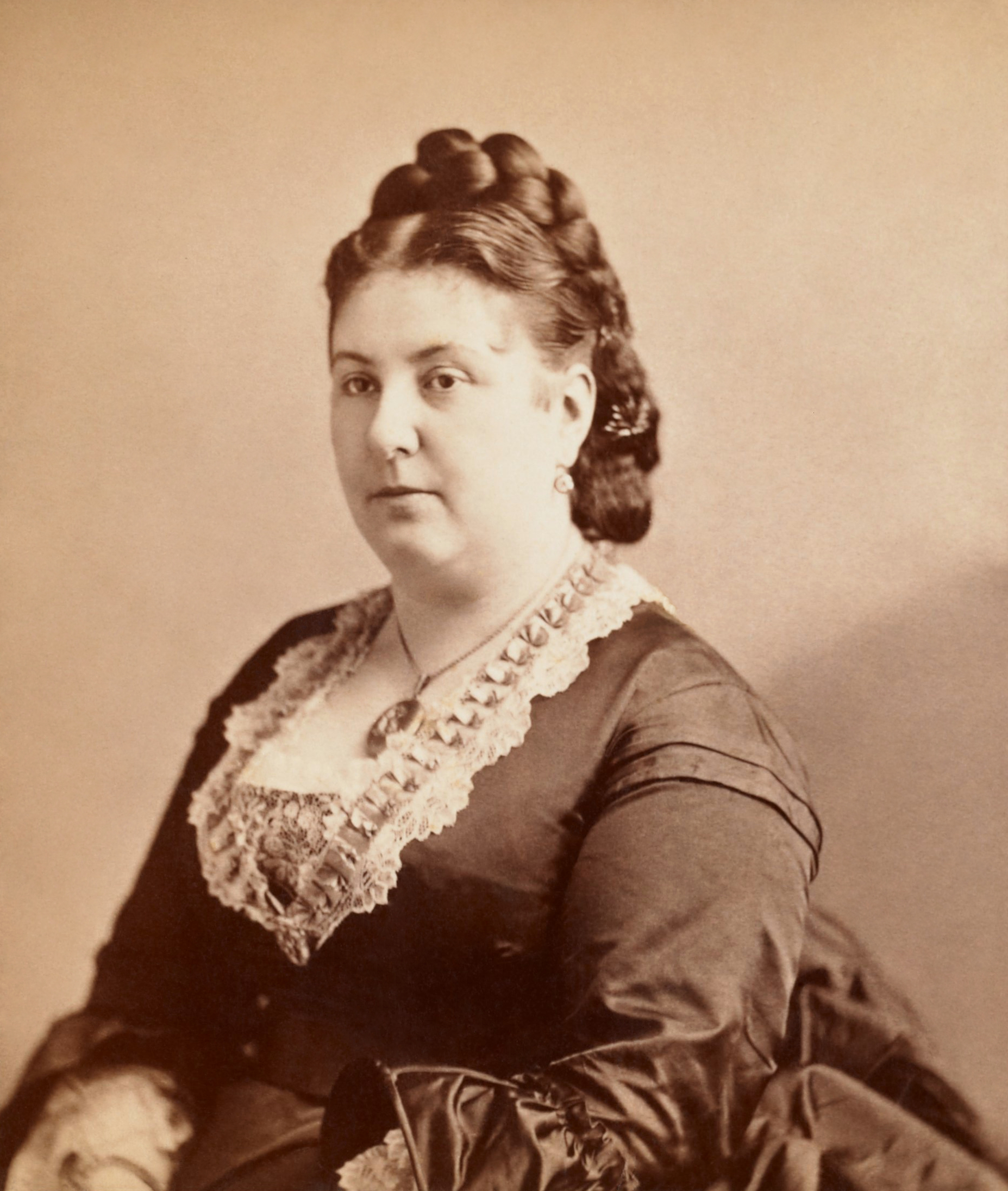
Photograph of Euphrosyne Parepa-Rosa by Jeremiah Gurney, between 1869 and 1874

Euphrosyne Parepa-Rosa (7 May 1836 – 21 January 1874) was a British operatic soprano who established the Carl Rosa Opera Company together with her husband Carl Rosa. Parepa's aristocratic father died soon after her birth, and her mother turned to the stage to support them. Parepa made her operatic debut in 1855 and soon earned enthusiastic reviews in the major London opera houses. In 1867, following the death of her first husband, Parepa married the violinist and conductor Carl Rosa in New York, and they founded an opera company with Parepa as the leading lady. They toured successfully in America for several years. After their return to Britain with ambitious plans for their opera company, Parepa fell ill and died in 1874 at 37 years of age.

== Early life and career ==
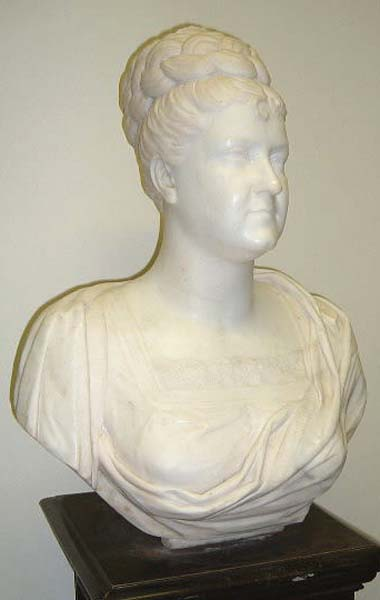
Bust of Parepa-Rosa, Royal Academy of Music

Euphrosyne Parepa was born in Edinburgh, Scotland, to the soprano Elisabeth Seguin (b. 1812, sister of basso Arthur Edward Seguin) and the Wallachian boyar Demetrius Parepa, Baron Georgiades de Boyescu of Bucharest. Her father died when Parepa was an infant, leaving her young mother impoverished. Parepa's mother turned to the stage to support her child and herself and trained her daughter in singing.

Parepa-Rosa's operatic début was in Malta in 1855 as Amina in La Sonnambula, followed by engagements in Italy, Spain and Portugal. She gave her first London performance at the Lyceum Theatre, in the role of Elvira in I Puritani, with the Royal Italian Opera company, with whom she spent the 1857 season. The critic of The Observer wrote of this introduction: "Parepa possesses a soprano voice of excellent quality and remarkable compass. She acts and sings well. Her version of "Son vergine vezzosa" elicited applause terminating in a recall, and … [after the finale] she was again called for. … "Qui la voce" … was correctly and brilliantly executed; and the artiste was again summoned back to the stage to receive the homage of the audience."

From 1859 to 1865, she appeared in opera at both Royal Opera House in Covent Garden and at Her Majesty's Theatre, becoming known for such roles as Leonora in Il trovatore, Zerlina in Fra Diavolo and Elvira in La muette de Portici. During this time, she participated in two operatic premieres, creating the title role in Alfred Mellon's Victorine in 1859 and the role of Mabel in George Alexander Macfarren's opera Helvellyn in 1864. She also was a successful oratorio and concert soloist, in constant demand in Britain and beyond. She sang with Charles Santley at the opening of the Oxford Music Hall in 1861, appeared before the Royal Philharmonic Society in Schumann's Paradise and the Peri and participated in the 19th-century English revival of the music of Handel, performing at the Handel festivals of 1862 and 1865, and in Germany.

== Marriages and later years ==
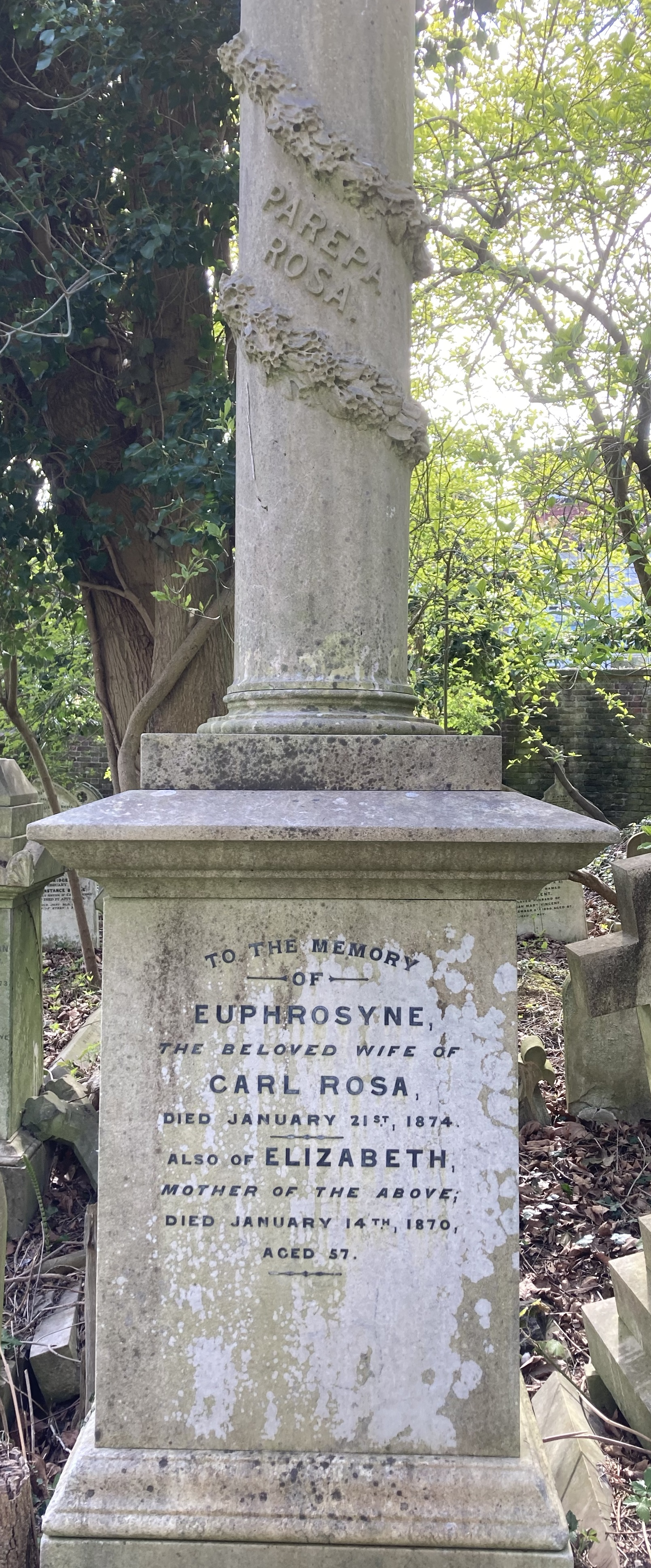
Grave of Parepa-Rosa in Highgate Cemetery

Her first husband, Army Captain H. de Wolfe Carvelle, died in Peru in 1865, sixteen months after their wedding. She travelled to the United States in 1865 with cornetist Jules Levy and violinist Carl Rosa, the latter of whom she married in New York City in 1867. Together they quickly established the Parepa-Rosa English Opera Company there, featuring her as the leading soprano, which became popular, and which introduced opera to places in America that had never staged it before. They opened at the French Theatre on Fourteenth Street, New York City, in September 1869 with a performance of Balfe's opera The Puritan's Daughter, with Parepa singing the title role. The subsequent tour of the eastern and midwestern states included a repertoire that ranged from The Bohemian Girl and Maritana to Weber's Der Freischütz and Oberon.

In 1870, the Parepa-Rosa Opera Company returned to Britain and then appeared in Italian opera at Cairo, Egypt, followed by a return to America for another successful tour in 1871–72. In 1872, Parepa sang at the Lower Rhine Festival in Düsseldorf, and they then returned to London, where she sang Donna Anna in Don Giovanni and the title role in Norma at the Royal Opera House. In September 1873, the company changed its name to Carl Rosa's English Opera, since Parepa was pregnant.

Parepa died in London, after an illness, at the age of 37 while preparing to sing Elsa in an English version of Wagner's Lohengrin as part of her husband's planned season a Theatre Royal, Drury Lane; after her death, Rosa cancelled the season. She is buried at Highgate cemetery. After her death, Rosa endowed the Parepa-Rosa Scholarship at the Royal Academy of Music in her memory.

== Reputation ==
William Winter wrote that "Great vocal powers have seldom found such ample or such touching expression as those of Parepa-Rosa did in the first act of Norma. … [O]ne of her best successes was made as Rosina in The Barber of Seville ... to indicate the versatility of her talents and the scope and thoroughness of her culture." Her obituary in Illustrated London News stated: "Her voice was a genuine soprano, of extensive compass and fine quality, while her highly-cultivated execution and her general musical knowledge gave her exceptional advantages, both mechanical and intellectual".

Her achievements were recognised by the Philharmonic Society of London (now the Royal Philharmonic Society) with the award of their gold medal in 1872.

== Gallery ==
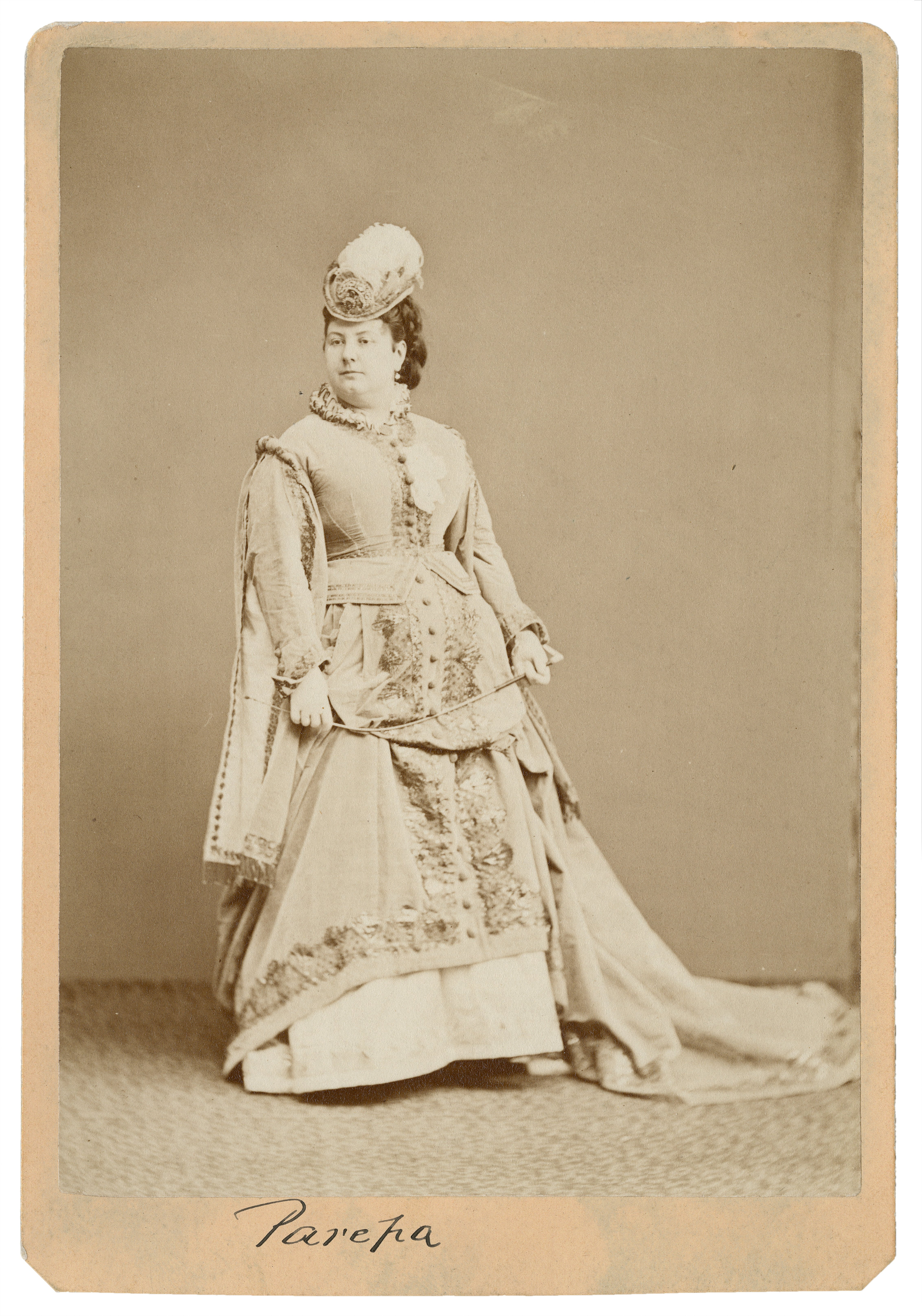
In the title role of Friedrich von Flotow's Martha

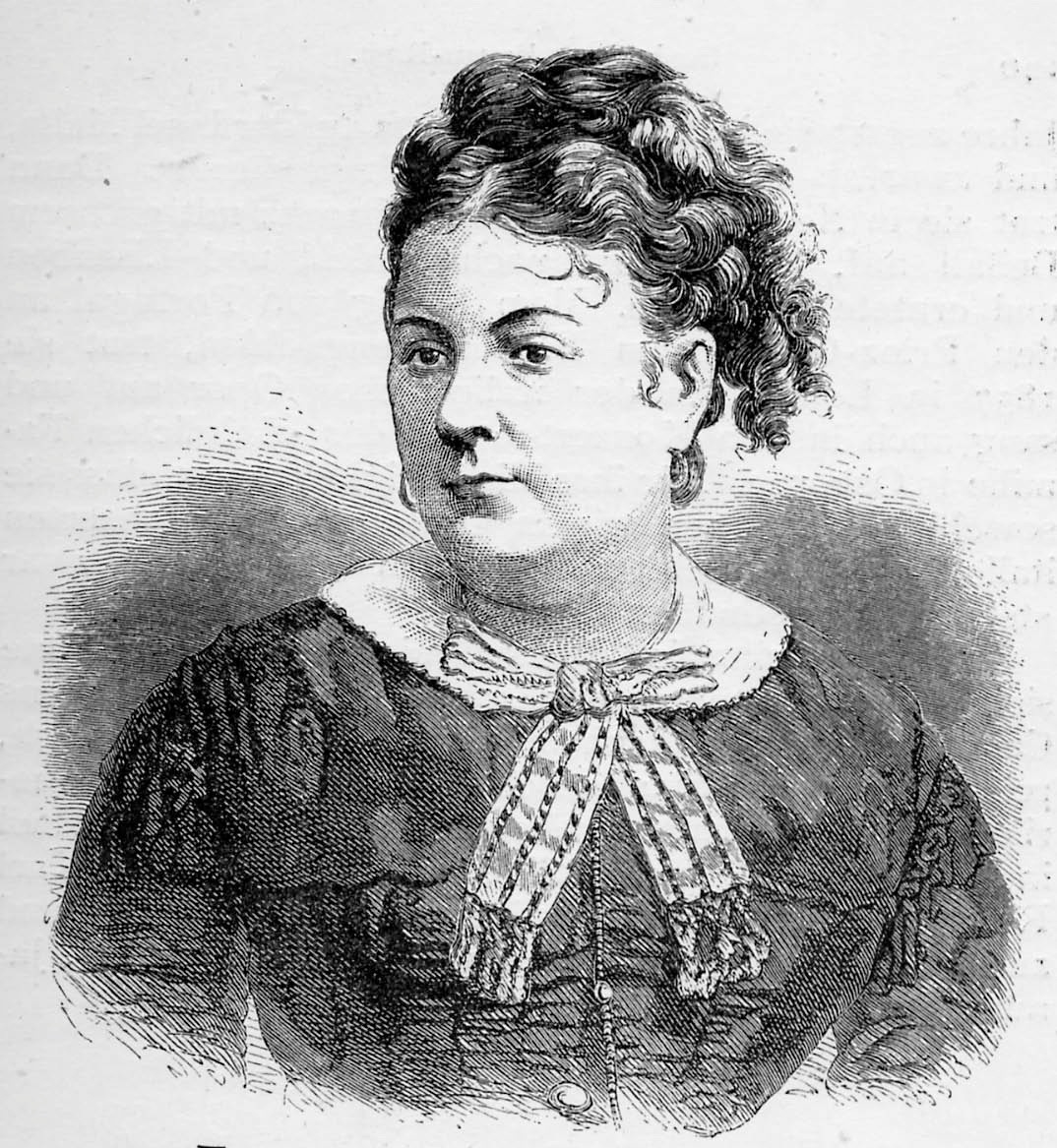
Parepa-Rosa

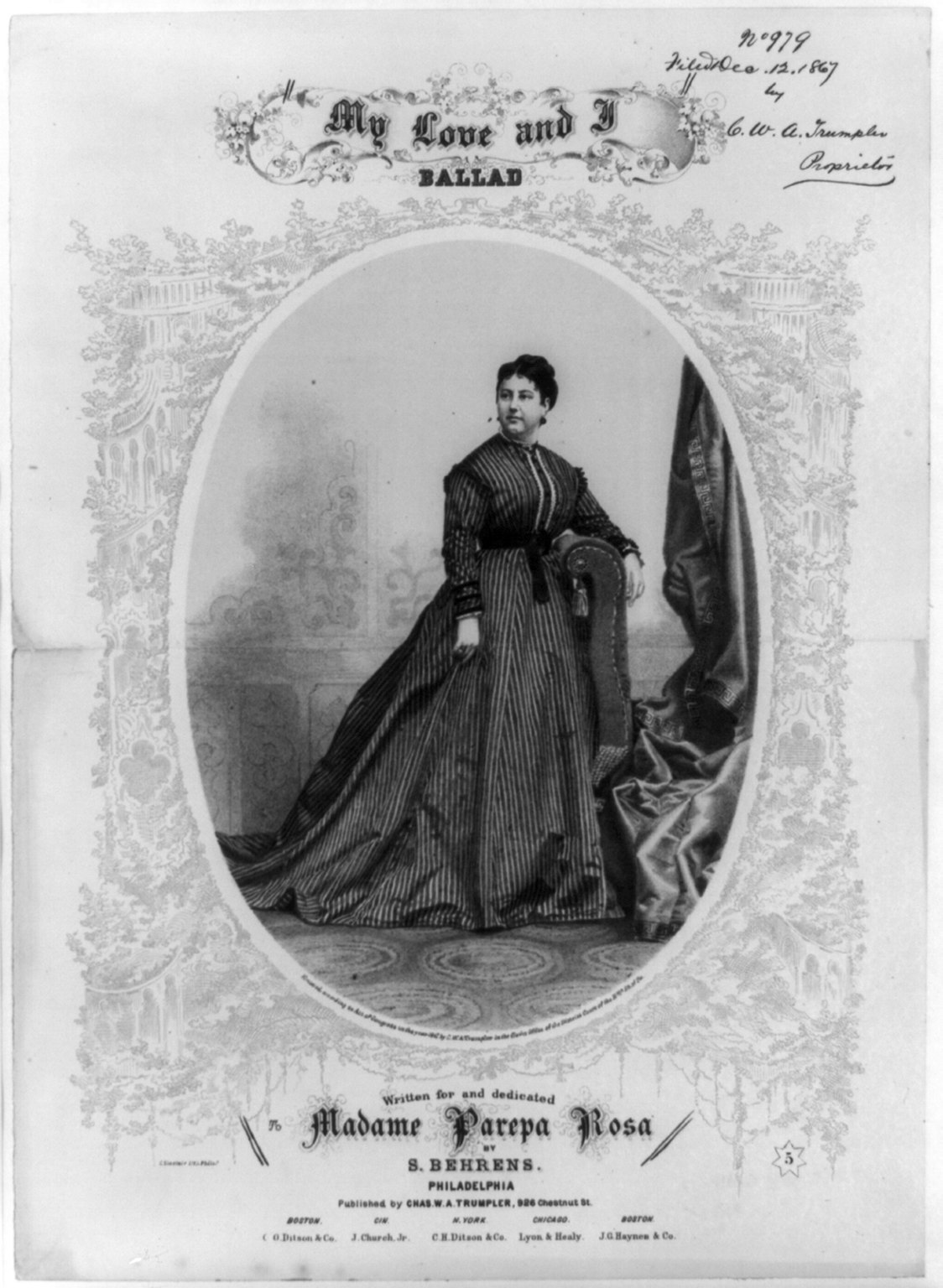
Sheet music for S. Behrens's "My Love and I"

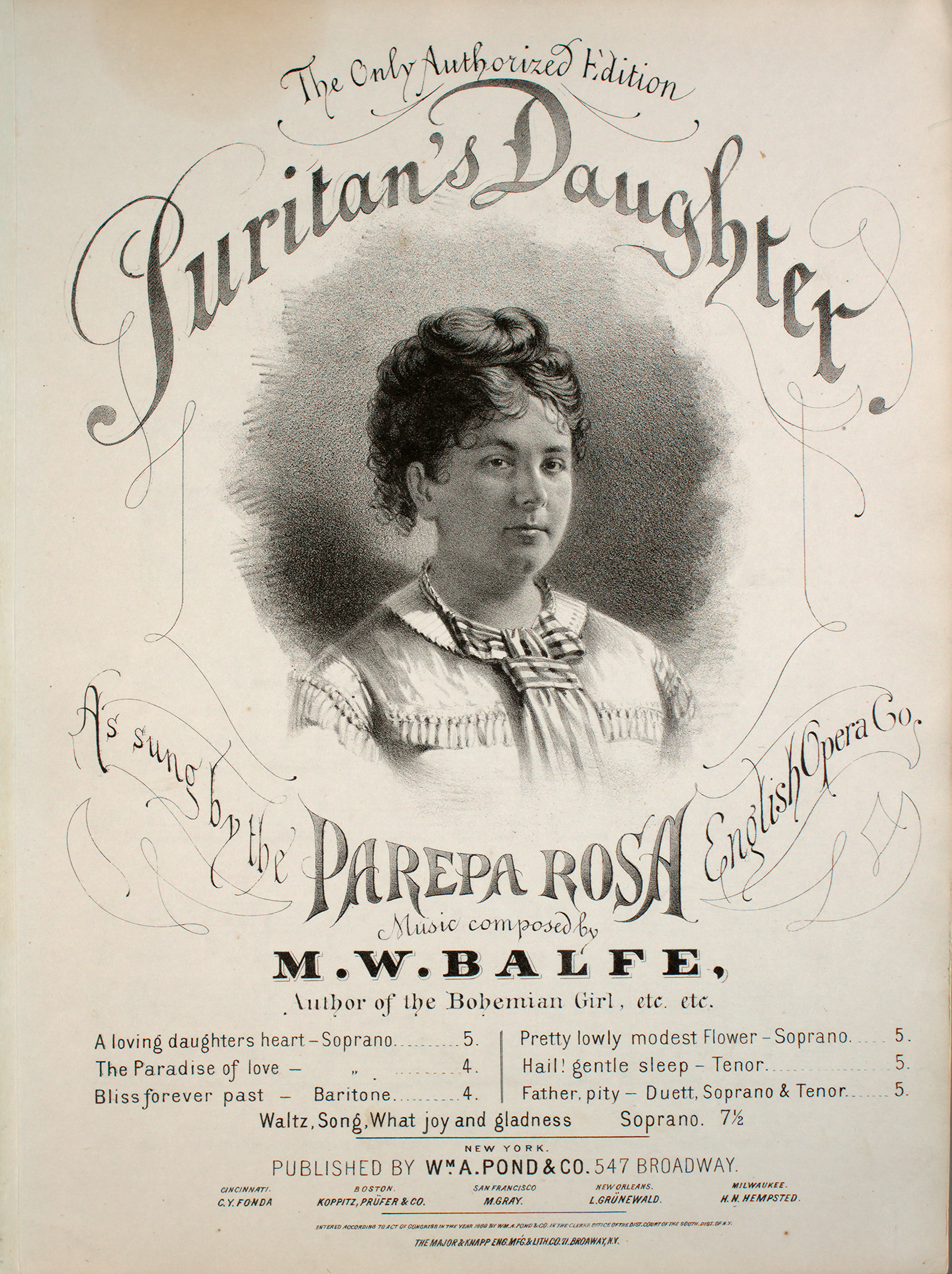
Vocal score for Balfe's The Puritan's Daughter

== See also ==
- John Nelson Pattison – one of Parepa-Rosa's accompanists
