= Prima donna =

Leading female singer in an opera company

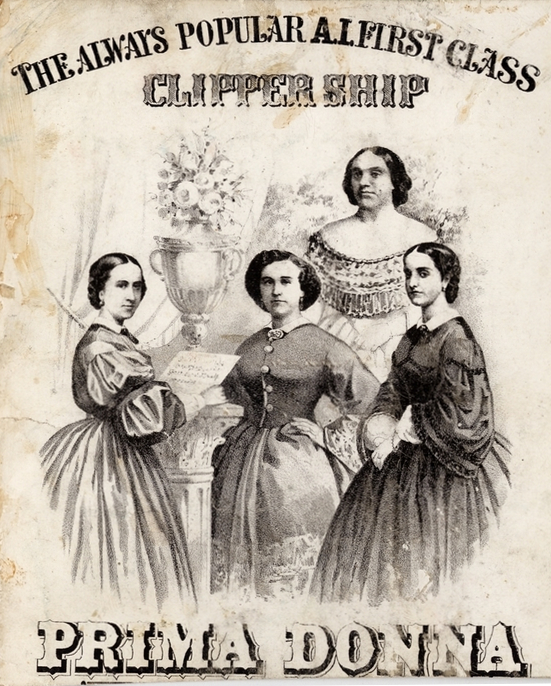
Prima donna clipper ship card

In opera or commedia dell'arte, a prima donna (Italian: [ˈpriːma ˈdɔnna]; Italian for 'first woman'; pl.: prime donne) is the leading female singer in the company, the person to whom the prime roles would be given.

The prima donna in opera was normally, but not necessarily, a soprano. The corresponding term for the male lead (usually a castrato in the 17th and 18th centuries, later a tenor) is primo uomo..

Prime donne often had grand off-stage personalities and were seen as demanding of their colleagues. Because of this, the term has spread in contemporary usage to refer to any person behaving in a demanding or temperamental fashion or having an inflated view of oneself.

== Opera ==
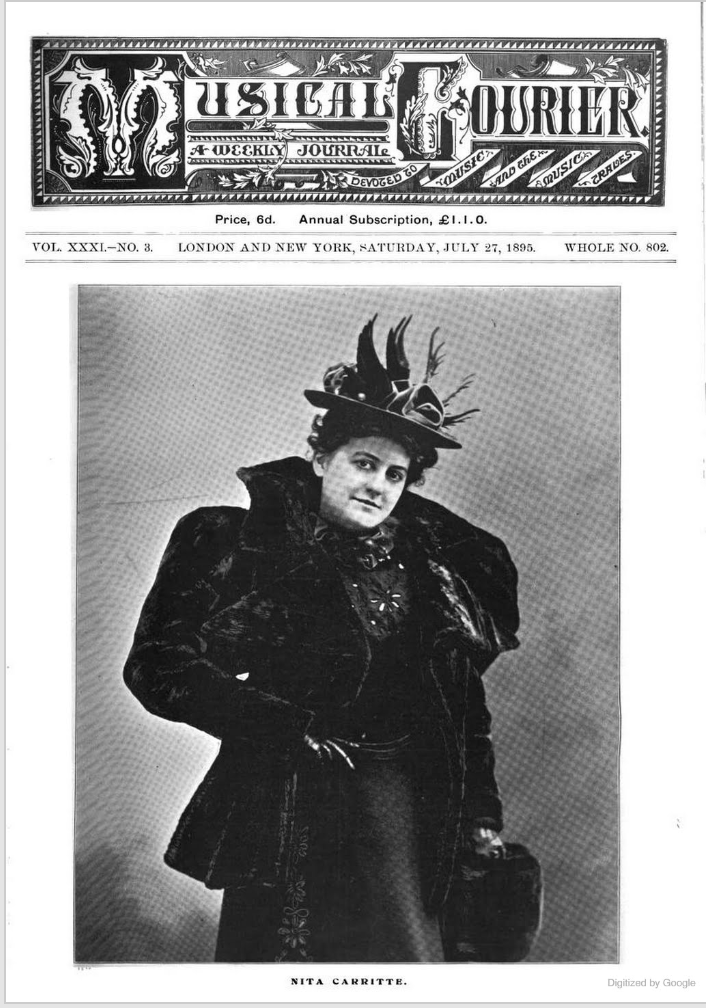
Nita Carritte, prima donna, Carl Rosa Opera Company, 1895

In 19th century Italy, the leading woman in an opera or commedia dell'arte company was known as the prima donna, literally the "first lady". This woman, usually the principal soprano of the company, would typically perform leading roles and generally sing more music than other women in the company. Famous opera prime donne have often caused opera enthusiasts to divide into opposing "clubs", supporting one singer over another. The rivalry between the fans of Maria Callas and Renata Tebaldi, for example, was one of the most famous, despite the friendship of the two singers.

The designation prima donna assoluta (lit. 'absolute first lady') is occasionally applied to a prima donna of outstanding excellence. It has also been used to describe the creators of heroic coloratura roles in the first half of the 19th century.

The woman who sang the second major part in an opera was, correspondingly, referred to as the seconda donna; by the late 18th century, this role was sometimes called the altra prima donna.

== Personality ==
At times, these prime donne had grand off-stage personalities and strict demands of fellow troupe members, musicians, set and wardrobe designers, producers, and other staff. However, they were deferentially tolerated because of their consummate talent and their draw at the box office. From this experience, the term prima donna has come into common usage in any field, denoting someone who behaves in a demanding, often temperamental fashion, revealing an inflated view of themselves, their talent, and their importance. Due to this association, the contemporary meaning of the word has taken on the negative connotation of a vain, undisciplined, egotistical, obnoxious, or temperamental person who finds it difficult to work under direction or as part of a team but whose contributions are essential to the success of the team.

== See also ==
The dictionary definition of prima donna at Wiktionary

- Convenienze
- Diva
- Entitlement
- Prima ballerina
