= Emilio Belari =

Spanish voice teacher, tenor, writer and journalist

Emilio Yela de la Torre, better known as Emilio Belari, (c. 1837 — 18 May 1907) was a Spanish voice teacher, tenor, writer on vocal pedagogy, and journalist.

== Life and career ==
Emilio Belari was born Emilio Yela de la Torre in Madrid in c. 1837. His family was part of the Spanish nobility, and his mother was the cousin of Agustín Fernando Muñoz y Sánchez, 1st Duke of Riánsares who married Queen Maria Christina of the Two Sicilies.

Belari began his professional life working as a journalist for newspapers in Spain. He worked for future Spanish Prime Minister Práxedes Mateo Sagasta who was an editor of the newspaper La Iberia, and the two men developed a close friendship. He then trained as an opera singer and performed as a leading tenor at the Théâtre italien de Paris; drawing acclaim on the European stage.

Belari then studied medicine and after completing his medical degree used his knowledge of human biology and singing to become a celebrated voice teacher and writer on vocal pedagogy. He began teaching singing out of a studio in Paris. He placed an emphasis on understanding the science of human anatomy, such as the vocal cords, within his approach to teaching vocal music. Under his birth surname, Yela de la Torre, he published the book La voz : su mecanismo, sus fenómenos y su educación según los principios de la física, la anatomía y la fisiología (English: The voice: its mechanism, its phenomena and its education according to the principles of physics, anatomy and physiology) in 1872. In 1883 his book The Secrets of the Voice in Singing was published under the surname of Belari. This latter book was recently republished by the Frankfurt academic publisher Outlook Verlag in 2024.

In c. 1882 Belari came to the United States with his own touring opera company. It was not successful. He became a highly regarded teacher of singing in New York City where he taught for twenty-five years until his death. He taught several famous vocalists, including Lillian Nordica. Other notable pupils included soprano Nita Carritte and bass, voice teacher, and choral conductor Edward M. Zimmerman. He also was the voice teacher of numerous upper society ladies of New York, among them Arabella Huntington (wife of Collis P. Huntington) and Louise Whitfield Carnegie (wife of Andrew Carnegie).

Belari died on 18 May 1907 at the age of 70. His death resulted from a fall out of his bedroom window in an apartment on the seventh floor of a building located at 824 W. 57th St. It was deemed a suicide by the New York City coroner, although the initial police investigation was unable to definitively make that claim. The Musical Courier obituary did not claim the event was a suicide stating instead that friends of Belari considered the fall "an accident" and "a mystery".
