= Nordica Homestead =

Historic house in Maine, United States

- U.S. National Register of Historic Places
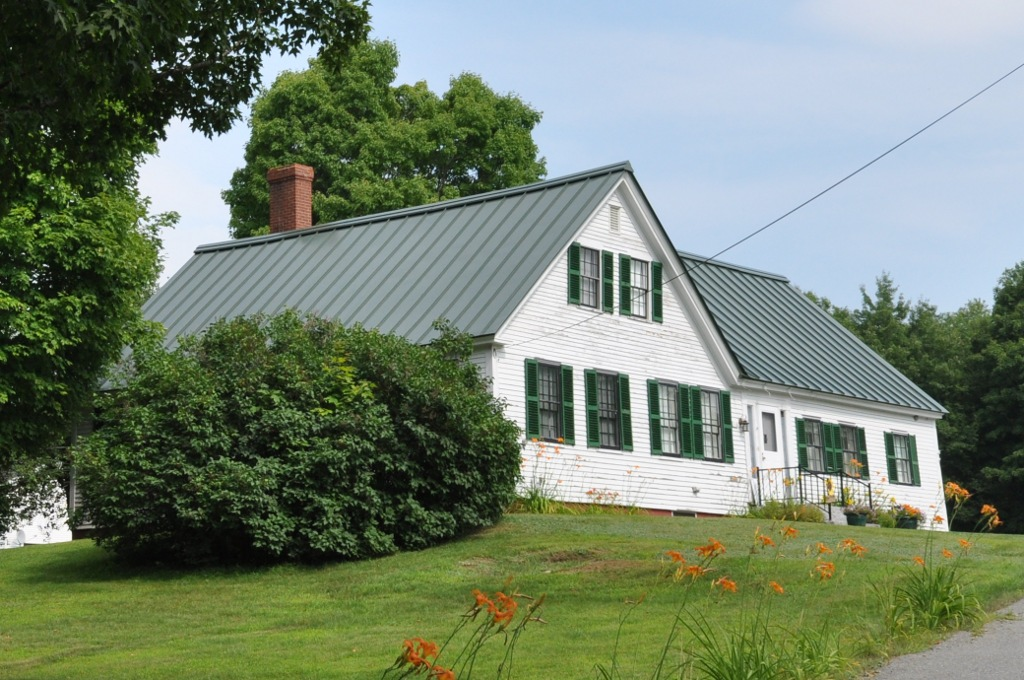

- Location within Maine Location within the United States
- Location: 116 Nordica Lane, Farmington, Maine
- Coordinates: 44°41′42″N 70°8′43″W
- Area: 115 acres (47 ha)
- Built: 1857
- NRHP reference No.: 69000006
- Added to NRHP: December 23, 1969

The Nordica Homestead is a historic house museum at 116 Nordica Road (a short drive off Holly Road) in Farmington, Maine. Built in 1840, this house was the birthplace and summer home of Lillian Nordica (1857–1914), one of the leading operatic sopranos of the late 19th and early 20th centuries. It has been a museum dedicated to her memory since 1928. It was listed on the National Register of Historic Places in 1969. It is open to the public between June and October.

== Description and history ==
The Nordica Homestead is a 1 1/2-story wood frame Cape style house, with a clapboard siding and a granite foundation. An ell enlarges the house to the rear. The interior retains original pine flooring, painted with spattered colors, and wallpaper. A barn is one of the only surviving agricultural outbuildings of the 115-acre (47 ha) property. The house built in 1840 by Edwin Norton, a local farmer with large landholdings in the Farmington area.

Edwin's daughter Lillian was born in this house in 1857, and lived there until age five. She received vocal training at the New England Conservatory in Boston, Massachusetts, and had an illustrious career in the opera under the stage name "Lillian Nordica". Although this property was sold by the family in 1857, it was repurchased by two of Nordica's sisters and given to her in 1911. She then visited it in the summers until her death in 1914. The property fell vacant and declined, until a group of friends and admirers banded together to restore it. They purchased the property, restored it, and opened it in 1928 as a museum dedicated to Noordica's memory.

The property was listed on the National Register of Historic Places in 1969. It is open to the public between June and October; a small admission fee is charged.

== See also ==
- National Register of Historic Places listings in Franklin County, Maine
