= Lillian Nordica =

American operatic soprano (1857–1914)

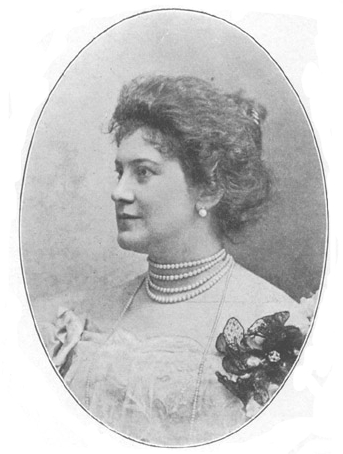
- Lillian Nordica

Background information
- Born: Lillian Allen Norton; December 12, 1857; Farmington, Maine, US
- Died: May 10, 1914 (aged 56) Jakarta, Java
- Genres: classical
- Occupations: Singer
- Years active: 1876–1914
- Label: Edison

Lillian Nordica (December 12, 1857 – May 10, 1914) was an American opera singer who had a major stage career in Europe and her native country. Nordica established herself as one of the foremost dramatic sopranos of the late 19th and early 20th centuries.

== Early life and education ==
Lillian Allen Norton was born in 1857 in a small Cape Cod style farmhouse built by her grandfather on a hill in Farmington, Maine.

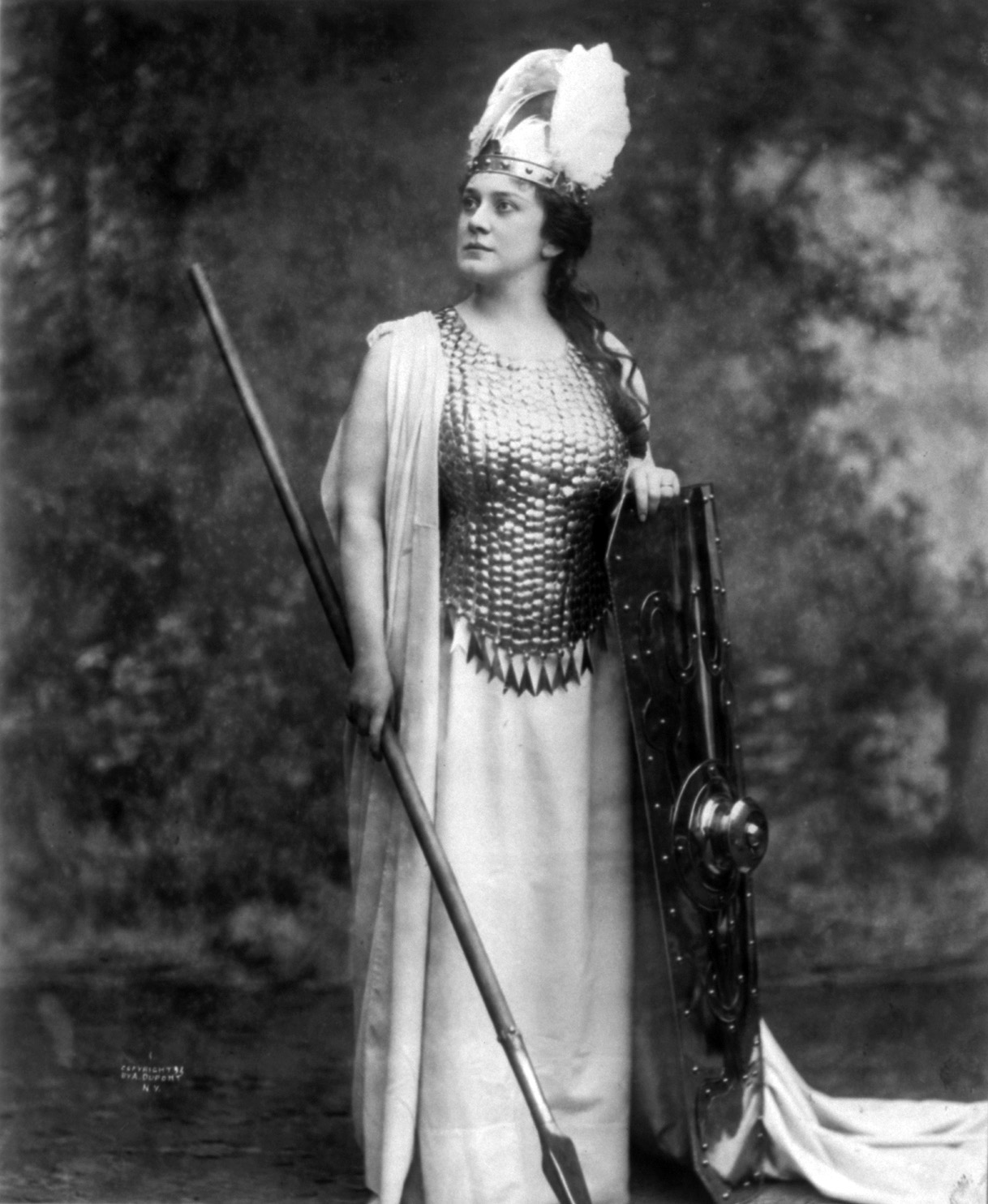
Nordica as Brünnhilde, 1898

In her youth, Norton is said to have possessed an inherent fondness for music and the sounds of singing birds and running brooks. When she was eight her family moved to Boston, Massachusetts to continue the musical education of her sister Wilhelmina. Wilhelmina died before her 18th birthday. Family hopes were then pinned on Lillian, and her musical education began soon thereafter. She trained as a singer in Boston under Martin Röder, graduating from the New England Conservatory in that city at the age of 18. She later studied in New York City with Emilio Belari.

== Career ==
Norton made her public debut at the conservatory as a soloist with the Handel and Haydn Society.

Norton then travelled to Italy to study the bel canto vocalism in Milan. "Nordica", a stage name, was bestowed by an Italian maestro at the beginning of her operatic career. He convinced her that European opera-goers would not tolerate a diva with a plain sounding, Anglo-American name. The adopted name, Giglia Nordica, meant "Lily of the North", but she soon became known as "Madame Nordica" or simply as "Nordica".

As Madame Nordica, she made her operatic debut at Brescia in 1879. She achieved a high rank among the international prima donnas of her era, appearing in many major musical venues in Western Europe and Russia. She sang for example at the Royal Opera House, London, from 1887 to 1893 and performed at the Bayreuth Festival in Germany in 1894 as Elsa in Lohengrin. In her native America, Nordica was particularly associated with the Metropolitan Opera in New York, where her frequent stage partner was the Polish tenor Jean de Reszke. She sang at the Met from 1891 until 1910, with some breaks in between.

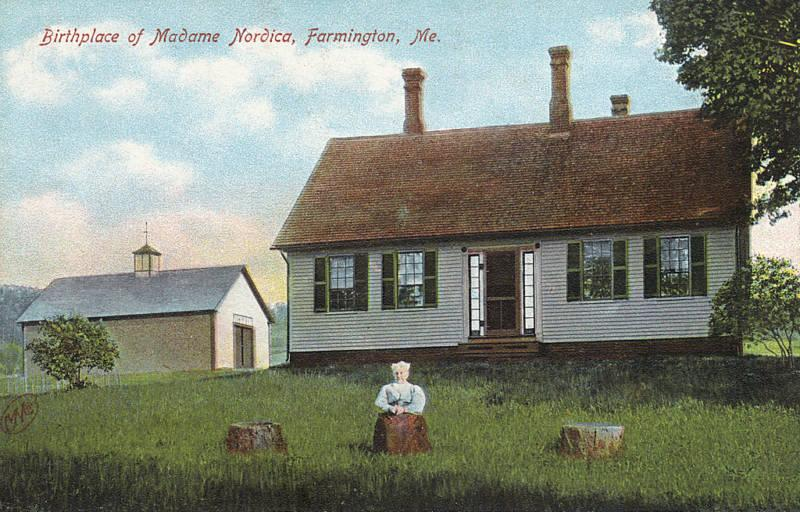
Nordica's birthplace c. 1908

Nordica possessed an extremely big, agile and pure-toned soprano voice. Her repertoire included Aida, Wagner's Ring Cycle (as Brünnhilde), Tristan und Isolde, Lohengrin, La traviata, Il trovatore, La Gioconda, Faust, Les Huguenots, Mignon and Le nozze di Figaro.

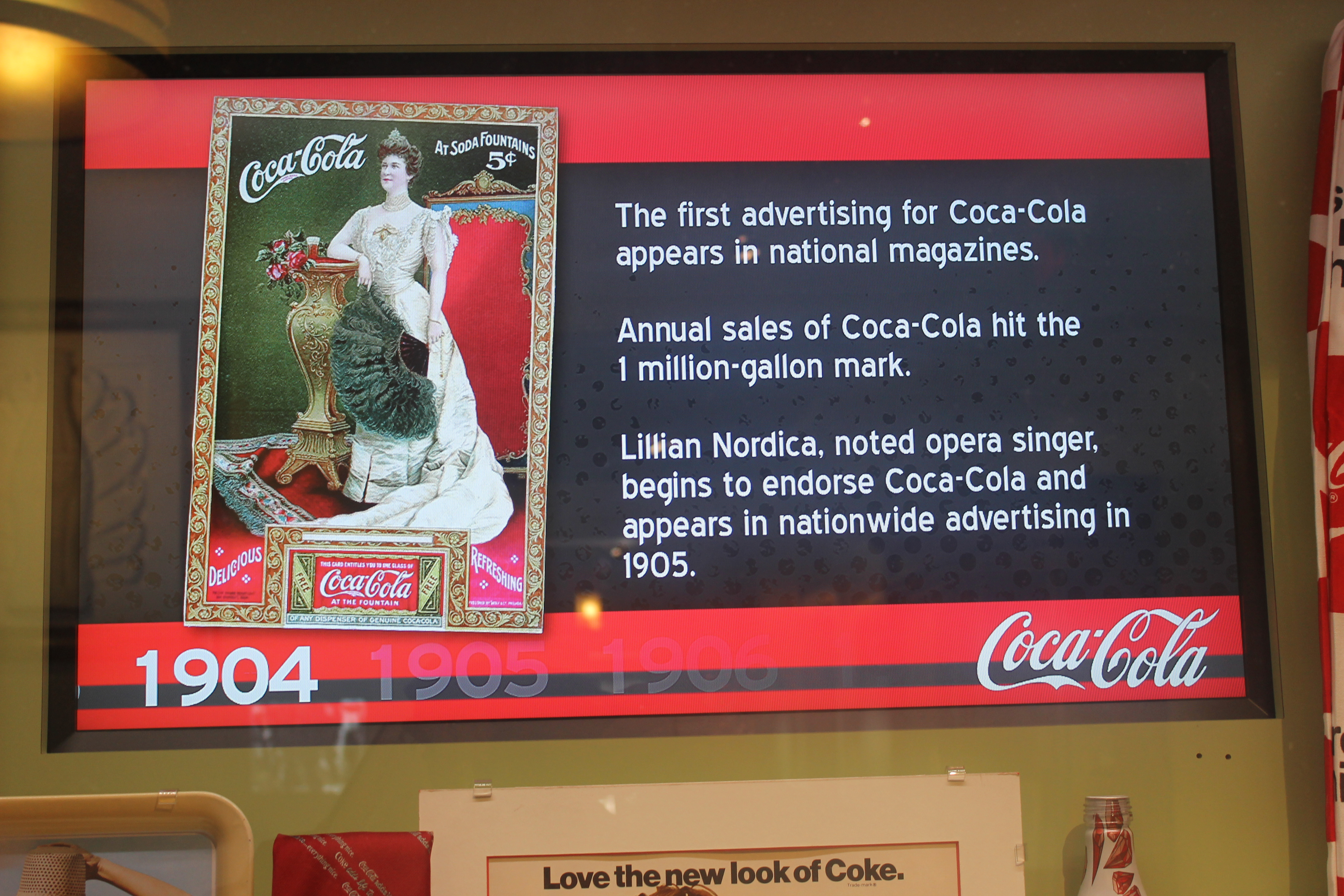
Nordica advertises Coca-Cola in 1904; placard at Biedenharn Museum and Gardens in Monroe, Louisiana

Nordica wrote a treatise called Hints to Singers. A copy is appended to her Yankee Diva biography.

By 1913, Nordica's voice and health were in decline. This did not prevent her from embarking on a tour of Australia, which proved to be her last.

== Recordings ==
1908 recording
Lillian Nordica singing "Mighty Lak' a Rose"

Nordica made a number of acoustic discs for Columbia Records. They were recorded comparatively late in her career, however, and are of a poor technical standard. Nevertheless, they do indicate her range as a singer, for she is able to perform both coloratura showpieces (such as "Io son Titania" from Mignon) and dramatic Wagnerian solos (such as "Mild und leise" from Tristan und Isolde). Her best known record is probably that of a demanding aria from the Hungarian opera Hunyadi Laszlo by Ferenc Erkel, which she cut in 1907. Nordica can be also heard briefly in some of the Mapleson Cylinders that were recorded during actual performances at the Metropolitan Opera House during the first few years of the 20th century. The sound of these cylinders is primitive but the size of Nordica's voice can be understood as it rings out in a theatre acoustic. A CD of her gramophone and cylinder recordings was released by Marston Records in 2003, complete with extensive liner notes dealing with Nordica's voice and career (see below).

== Personal life ==
Nordica was married three times.

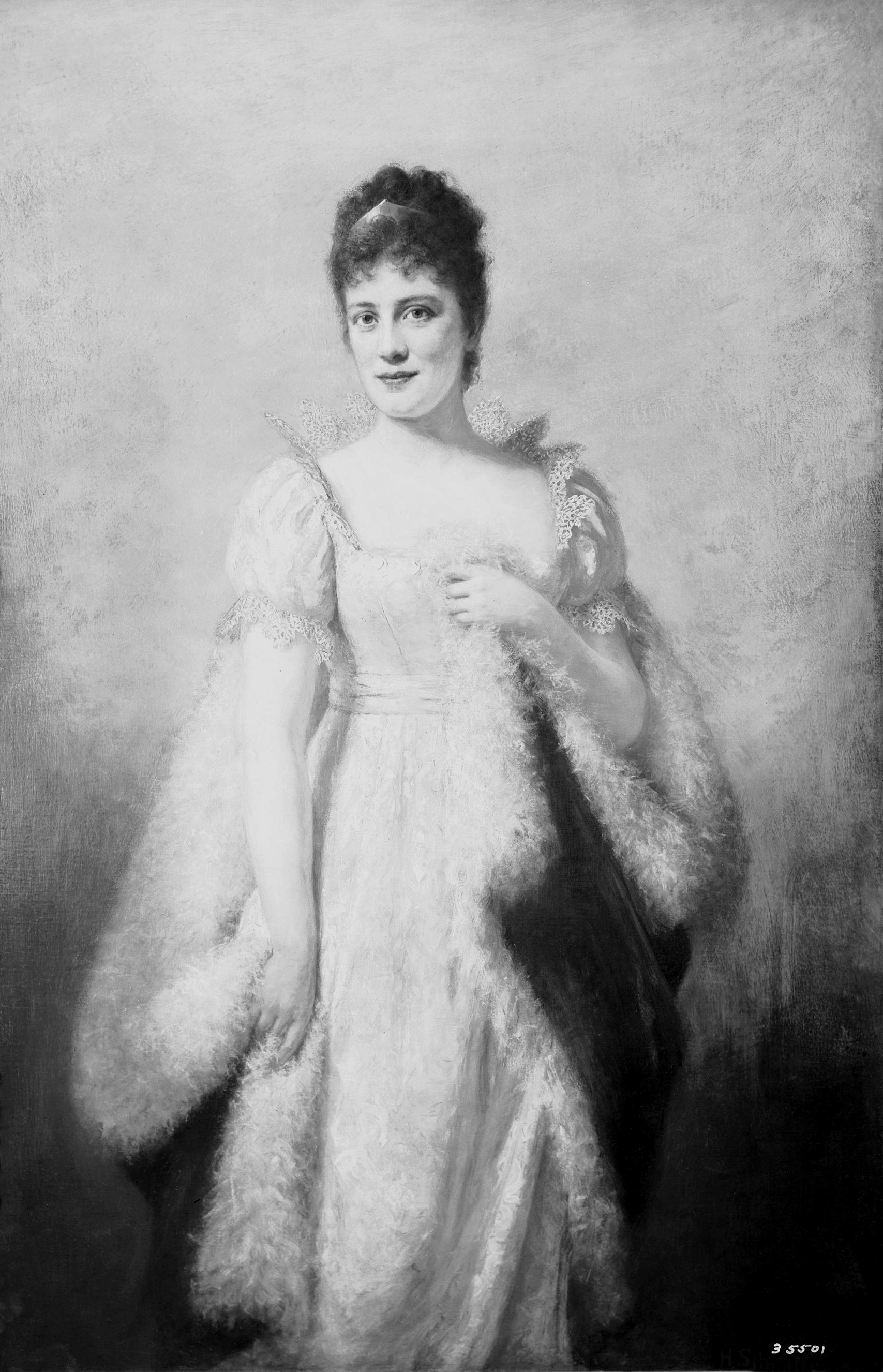
Portrait of Lillian Nordica (1878) by Hermann Schmiechen

In 1882, Nordica retired from the stage to marry Frederick A. Gower. She sued him for divorce in 1885 but he disappeared at about the time of the suit. It's thought he was probably killed in a balloon accident.

Her second marriage was in 1896 to the Hungarian tenor Zoltán Döhme (1864–1935). He had taken the title role in Parsifal at the Bayreuth Festival in 1894. She obtained a divorce from him in 1904.

Her third marriage was in 1909 to a wealthy New York banker, George Washington Young Sr. (1864–1926), but it also proved unhappy.

== Women's suffrage ==
Nordica was a vocal supporter of women's rights. She spoke out against the pay gap between male and female singers. Nordica raised funds for the Women's suffrage movement by giving concerts. She spoke from an open streetcar in San Francisco, encouraging women to vote, one day before the vote for the women's right in California.

In 1910, Nordica wrote a full page article for The New York Times. In this, she championed the women's suffrage cause.

== Death ==
Nordica nearly missed the ship departing Sydney after her 1913 Australian concert tour, but wired the captain asking him to wait for her. It would prove to be a fatal mistake. The Tasman hit a coral reef, where it remained for three days, and Nordica suffered hypothermia (exposure), from which she never recovered. She was taken to Thursday Island, Queensland, where she was hospitalised for some time. There, Nordica befriended a small American boy, who was taken ill while on a different vessel passing through Torres Strait. After his death, Nordica installed a gravestone in the local cemetery in his memory. She was well enough on Thursday Island to make a new will, which disinherited her husband. Nordica was then transferred to Batavia, in the Dutch East Indies (now Jakarta, Indonesia). She lingered for months, seeming to improve, only to fail again. Nordica died of pneumonia on May 10, 1914, in Batavia.

== Legacy ==
Her birthplace in Farmington, Maine, is today the Nordica Homestead, a museum and historic site. Nordica Auditorium in Merrill Hall at the University of Maine at Farmington is named after her.

The Australian poet and novelist Thomas Shapcott dramatised Nordica's shipwreck and death in his 1998 novel Theatre of Darkness.
