= Nita Carritte =

Canadian operatic soprano

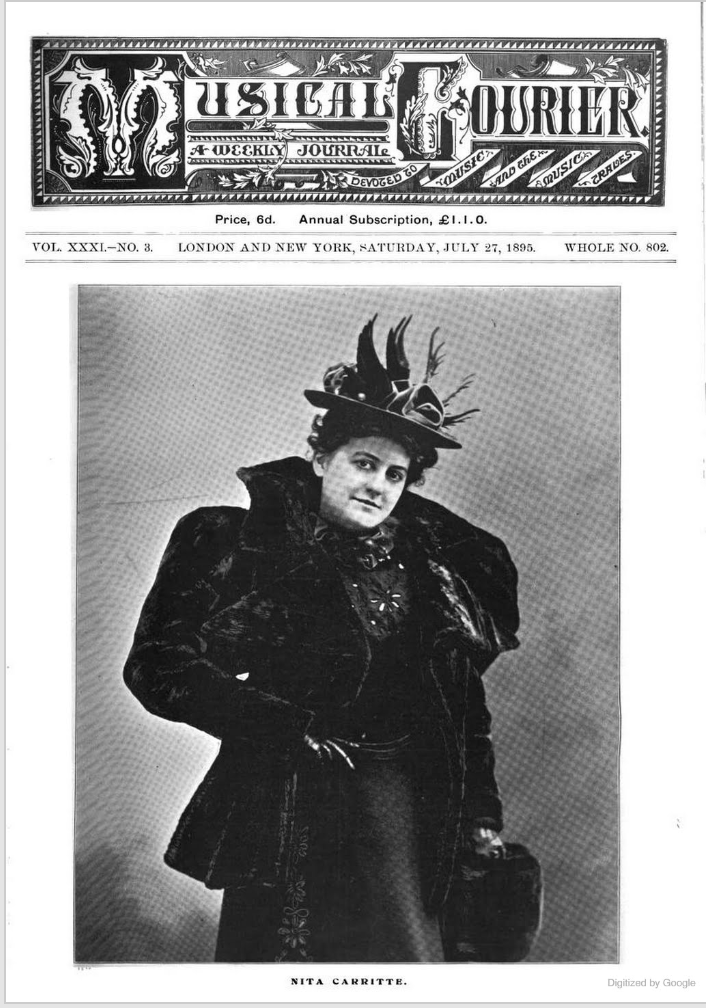
Nita Carritte, Musical Courier, 27 July 1895

Nita Carritte (c.1877-1929) was an operatic soprano from Halifax, Nova Scotia who toured as prima donna of the Carl Rosa Opera Company, D’Oyly Carte Opera Company and Castle Square Opera Company. Her signature role was Carmen.

== Career ==
When she was a child she moved with her parents to Virginia, where her father died. Her mother moved them to New York, where she studied with Emilio Belari (1885-1887).

According to the Musical Courier, she was the “favourite pupil” of Mme Anna de La Grange and Mathilde Marchesi in Paris. Composer Charles Gounod wrote that she “possesses a charming voice, charming execution and a charming nature.” She played Marguerite in his Faust and Juliette in his Roméo et Juliette.

She also worked with Sir Augustus Harris in London. Her first appearance in London was as Micaëla, A Village Maiden, in Carmen at Covent Garden (1890). She then worked for D’Oyly at the Savoy Theatre with Thomas Thorne to replace Esther Palliser as Gianetta, Contadina, in The Gondoliers (1891). On 5th Jan 1891 Nita Carritte started to play the role of Gianetta, giving around 54 performances, until 27 February.

After 15 months, she returned to Paris to study acting at the Grand Opera, Paris with Mad. Marchesi and receiving the advice of Jules Massenet.

In 1893-1895, she joined Duff’s English Opera Company in America. She sang the prima donna parts in Faust, Cavalleria Rusticana, Pagliacci and Carmen across the United States.

In 1895, she joined Carl Ross Co. again and appeared in England as Carmen. The May 12 edition of the Edinburgh Evening News wrote: “Her performance was almost flawless…. As a singer Mlle. Carritta should be another triumph for the Carl Rosa Company.”

Carritte returned to America for the 1897-98 season, appearing in New York with the Castle Square Opera Company in revivals of The Queen's Lace Handkerchief, The Fencing Master, and The Gypsy Baron.

She also found favour with Isabella II of Spain. She also sung frequently at the Palace de Castile, on the Avenue de Kieber, in Paris. She also sung at the Rothschilds in London and Paris. As well as at the homes of Gounod and Massenet in Paris and the homes of Duchess of Newcastle’s, Lady Anna Brassey, Lady Goldsmith and others.

== Gallery ==
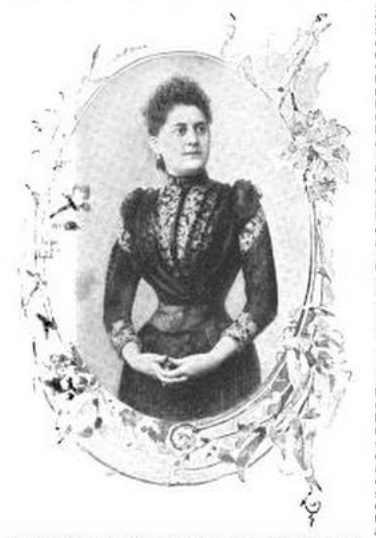
Nita Carritte, 1890

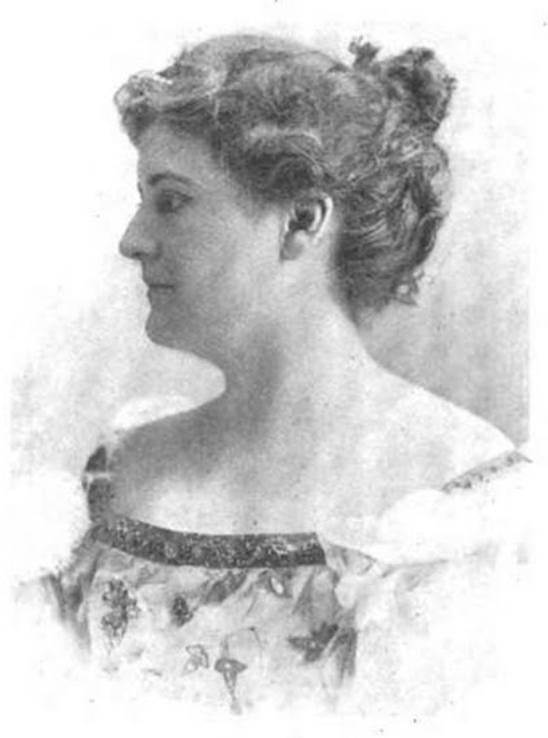
Nita Carritte, 1897
