= Joseph Maas =

English tenor singer (1847–1886)

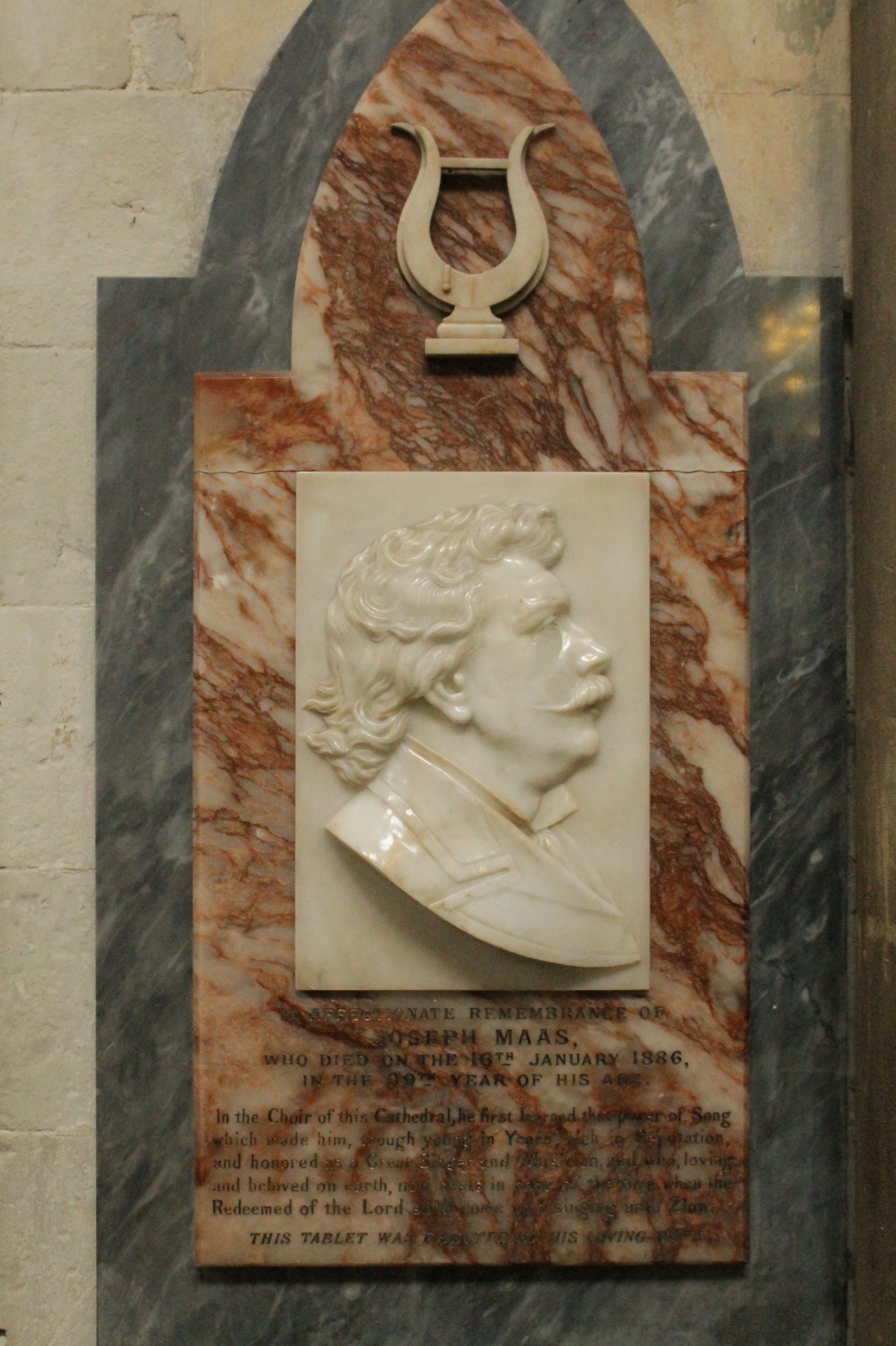
Memorial to Joseph Maas, Rochester Cathedral

Joseph Maas (30 January 1847 in Dartford, England – 16 January 1886 in London) was an English tenor singer.

He became a chorister in Rochester Cathedral. At first studying under J. C. Hopkins and Madame Bodda-Pyne, he went to study in Milan in 1869. In February 1871 he made his first success by taking Sims Reeves's place at a concert in London. In 1878 he became principal tenor in the Carl Rosa Opera Company, his beautiful voice and finished style more than compensating for his poor acting.

Maas died from rheumatic gout on 16 January 1886.

== Sources ==
- Laura Williams Macy – The Grove Book of Opera Singers
