= Carl Rosa Opera Company =

British opera company

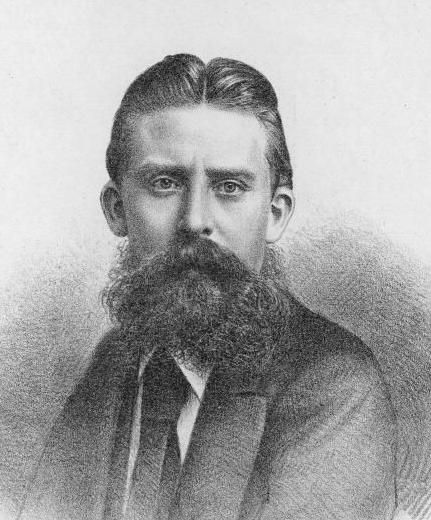
Carl Rosa

The Carl Rosa Opera Company was founded in 1873 by Carl Rosa, a German-born musical impresario, and his wife, British operatic soprano Euphrosyne Parepa-Rosa to present opera in English in London and the British provinces. The company premiered many operas in the UK, employing a mix of established opera stars and young singers, reaching new opera audiences with popularly priced tickets. It survived Rosa's death in 1889, and continued to present opera in English on tour until 1960, when it was obliged to close for lack of funds. The company was revived in 1997, presenting mostly lighter operatic works including those by Gilbert and Sullivan. The company "was arguably the most influential opera company ever in the UK".

== Background ==
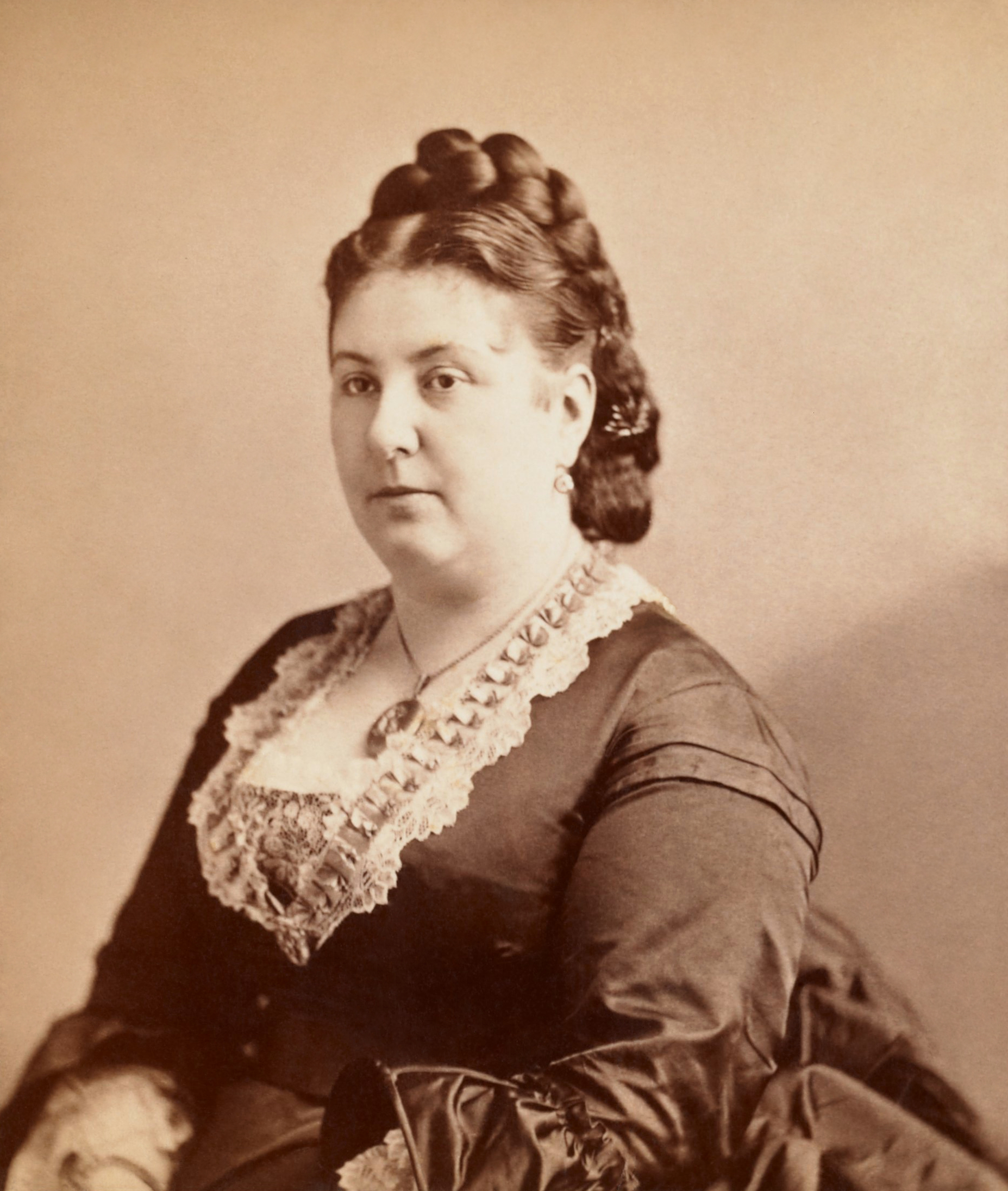
Euphrosyne Parepa-Rosa

Carl Rosa was born Karl August Nikolaus Rose in Hamburg, Germany, the son of a local businessman. A child violin prodigy, Rosa studied at the Conservatorium at Leipzig and in Paris. In 1863 he was appointed Konzertmeister at Hamburg, where he had occasional opportunities to conduct. He soon had considerable success as a conductor both in England and the United States. During an American tour in 1866–67 as conductor of a concert troupe that included the Scottish operatic soprano Euphrosyne Parepa, Rosa and Parepa were married.

From 1869 to 1872, Rosa and his wife toured their own opera company through America, with Parepa as the star and Rosa as the conductor. It brought opera to places that had never seen any, performing Italian operas in English, which made them more accessible to American audiences.

== Early years ==
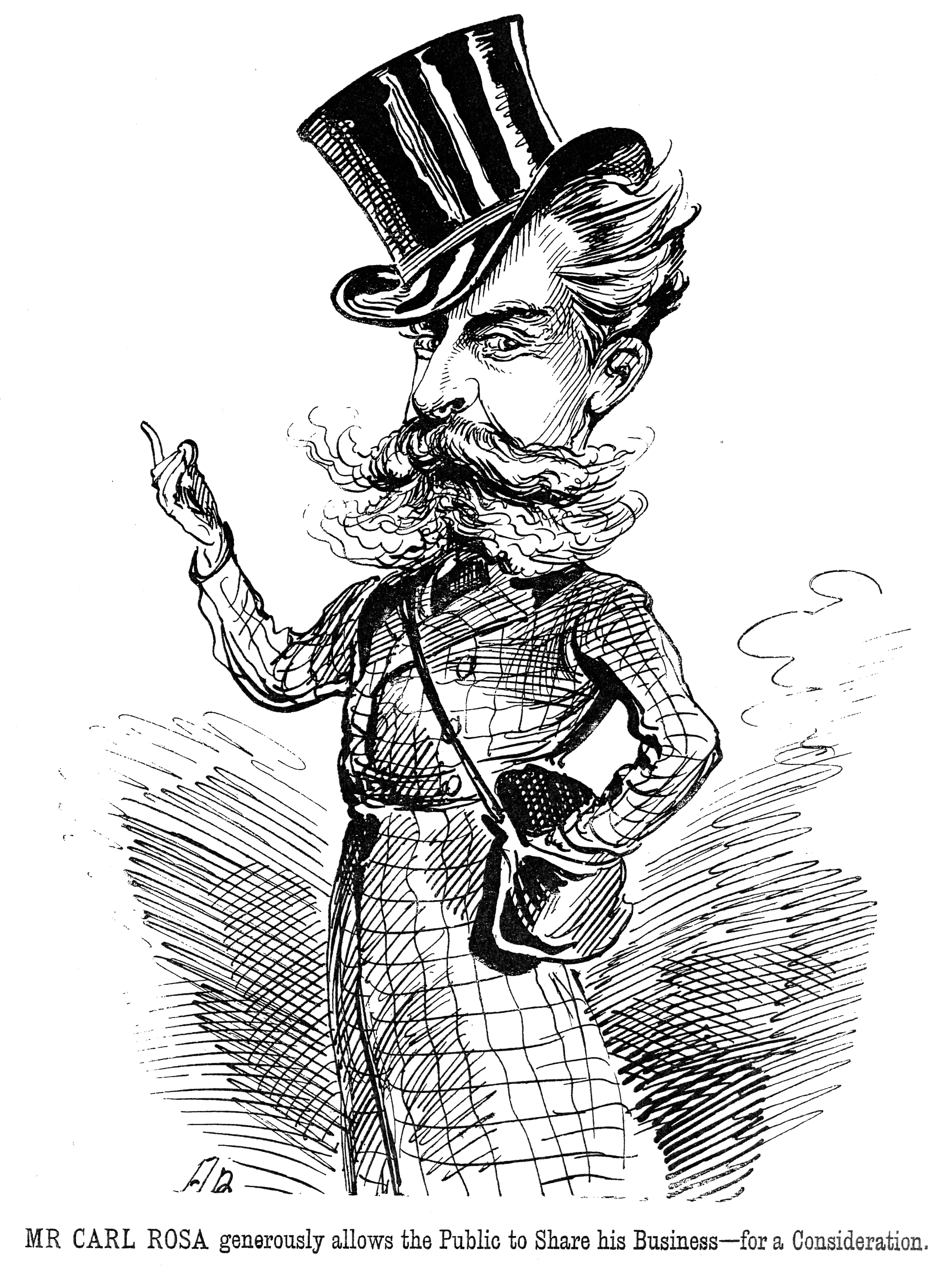
Cartoon from the Entr'acte, 1887

In 1872, the Rosas returned to England and also visited Europe and Egypt. In September the next year, they inaugurated the "Carl Rosa Opera" with a performance of William Vincent Wallace's Maritana in Manchester, on 1 September, and then toured England and Ireland. Rosa's policy was to present operas in English, and that remained the company's practice. Parepa fell ill and died in January 1874, and Rosa married a second time in 1881, to Josephine (d. 1927), with whom he had four children. In November 1874, Carl Rosa Opera made its first of many visits to Scotland with a two-week season at Glasgow's Prince of Wales Theatre. The company's first London season opened at the Princess's Theatre in September 1875, playing Mozart's The Marriage of Figaro, with Charles Santley as Figaro and Rose Hersee as Susanna. In 1876, Rosa staged a second London season, which featured the first performance in English of Wagner's The Flying Dutchman, with Santley in the title role.

For the next fifteen years, the company prospered and earned good notices, with provincial tours and London seasons, frequently in conjunction with Augustus Harris at the Drury Lane Theatre. Such was the success of the company that at one point three Carl Rosa touring troupes were set up. In October 1892, Rosa's Grand Opera Company received the royal accolade, with a command performance of Donizetti's La fille du régiment at Balmoral Castle. The French-American soprano Zélie de Lussan sang the heroine, Marie, and Aynsley Cook "vastly amused Queen Victoria as Sergeant Sulpice". In 1880, George Grove, editor of the authoritative musical reference work, Grove's Dictionary of Music and Musicians, wrote: "The careful way in which the pieces are put on the stage, the number of rehearsals, the eminence of the performers and the excellence of the performers have begun to bear their legitimate fruit, and the Carl Rosa Opera Company bids fair to become a permanent English institution."

The company introduced many works of important opera repertoire to England for the first time, performing some 150 different operas over the years. Besides Santley and Hersee, Blanche Cole, Minnie Hauk, Alice Esty, Fanny Moody, Alice Barth, Georgina Burns, Joseph Maas, Barton McGuckin, Giulia Warwick and William Ludwig were some of the famous singers associated with the company during its early years. Its successes included productions of Cherubini's Les deux journées (1875); The Flying Dutchman (1876), with Santley in the title role; the first English-language production of Carmen (1879), starring Selina Dolaro in the title role and Durward Lely as Don José; Rienzi (1879); Lohengrin (1880); Tannhäuser (1882); and the first British staging of Puccini's La bohème (1897). Alberto Randegger served as musical director of the company from 1879 to 1885, and Gustave Slapoffski was principal conductor from 1897 to 1900.

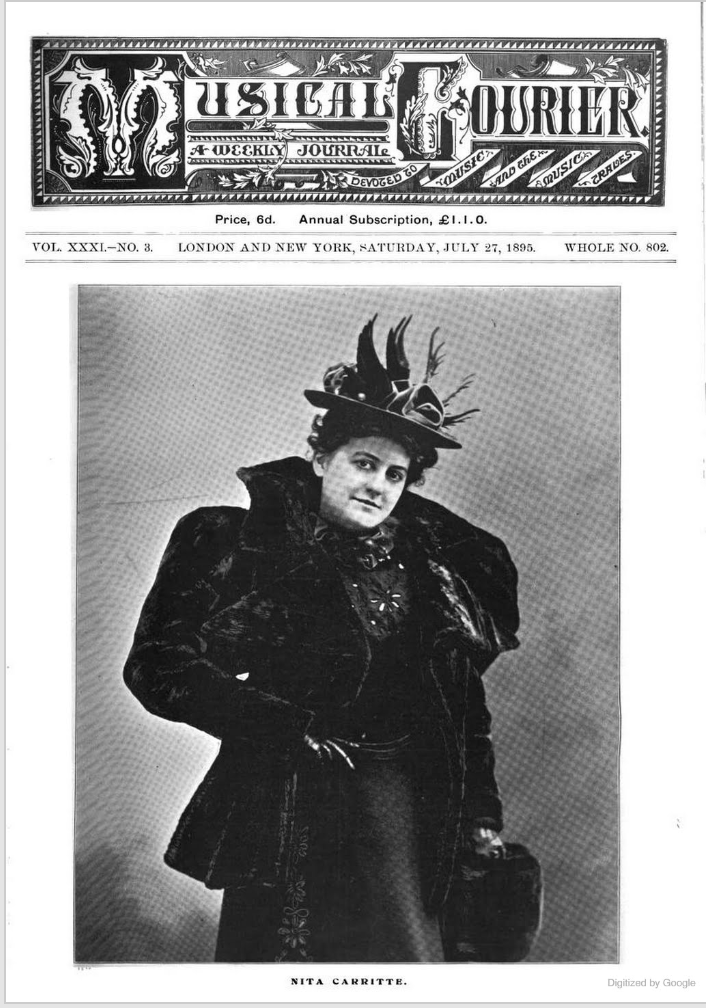
Nita Carritte, a Carl Rosa prima donna, in 1895

The company also encouraged and supported new works by English composers. Pauline in 1876 (Frederic Hymen Cowen), Esmeralda in 1883 (Arthur Thomas), Colomba in 1883, The Canterbury Pilgrims in 1884 (Charles Villiers Stanford), The Troubadour in 1886 (Alexander Mackenzie), and Nordisa in 1887 (Frederick Corder) were six of the operas commissioned by the company. Earlier English operas by Wallace, Michael Balfe and Julius Benedict were also included in the company's repertoire – not just standard works like The Bohemian Girl and Maritana, but less-familiar operas such as Balfe's Satanella (1858) and Wallace's Lurline (1860).

== Rosa's death; survival of the company ==
Carl Rosa died suddenly in Paris, on 30 April 1889, and was buried in Highgate Cemetery, London. Two years before his death, Rosa had turned his opera enterprise into a limited company, and it was in good financial and artistic shape at the time of his death. Hamilton Clarke was appointed conductor of the company in 1893. In 1897, the company gave the first British performance of Puccini's La bohème in Manchester under the supervision of the composer. The company then gave a season at Covent Garden, at reduced prices, aimed at attracting "the masses" to opera.

By 1900 the company was facing financial problems from which it was rescued by the conductor Walter van Noorden and his brother Alfred, who took over and restored financial and artistic standards. The company presented two seasons at Covent Garden in 1907–08 and 1909, including new productions of Tannhäuser and Tristan and Isolde conducted by Eugène Goossens II. The company survived World War I and the sudden death of Walter van Noorden in 1916, touring the British provinces. Many young British singers joined the company, including Olive Gilbert, Parry Jones, and Eva Turner, who sang Cio-Cio-San and Santuzza when the company presented three postwar seasons at Covent Garden.

In 1924, after another financial crisis, H. B. Phillips became the company's owner and director, and placed it once more on a sound financial footing. Regular London seasons alternated with large-scale provincial tours during the 1920s and 1930s. Although some productions had to be curtailed during World War II, the company nevertheless presented seasons in London and the provinces. Singers of the 1930s and 1940s included Dora Labbette, Joan Hammond, Heddle Nash, Norman Allin, Marina de Gabaráin and Otakar Kraus. Conductors included the refugees Walter Susskind (1942–44) Vilém Tauský (1945–49) and Peter Gellhorn, as well as Harold Gray (1943–1946).

== End of the old company and birth of the new ==
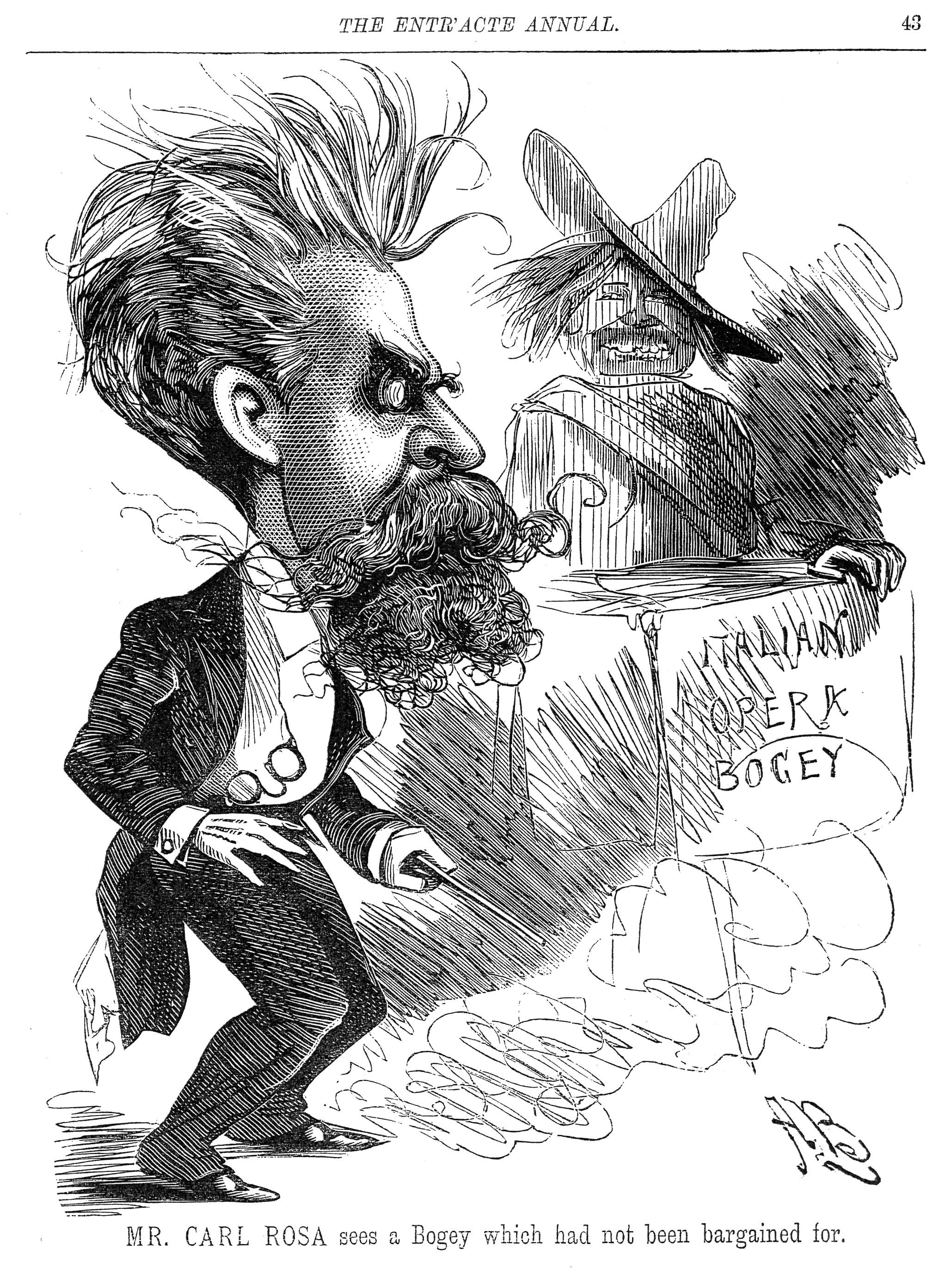
Carl Rosa startled by the bogey of Italian Opera in an 1886 cartoon by Alfred Bryan

Phillips died in 1950. In 1953 the Carl Rosa Trust was formed in association with the Arts Council, who agreed to subsidise the company, now directed by Phillips's widow, Annette. The company gave seasons at Sadler's Wells in 1955 and 1956. In the 1950s, the musical director was Arthur Hammond. Singers during this period included the dramatic soprano Ruth Packer, the tenor Charles Craig and the baritone Joseph Ward. The productions were traditional, but the repertory included some operatic rarities such as Puccini's Manon Lescaut and Berlioz's Benvenuto Cellini.

Annette Phillips retired as director of the company in 1957 and was replaced by Professor Humphrey Procter-Gregg. At the same time, the board of Sadler's Wells Opera made an approach to merge the two opera companies. This approach caused outrage in some operatic quarters, and Sadler's Wells's musical director (Alexander Gibson) and administrative heads (Norman Tucker and Stephen Arlen) resigned in protest. In response to the outcry, the board of the Welsh National Opera also made an attempt to merge with Carl Rosa Opera. In the ensuing furore, Procter-Gregg resigned, as did the chairman of the Carl Rosa Trust, Sir Donald Wolfit, and trustees Astra Desmond and Norman Allin. The Arts Council, which was accused in the House of Lords of "doing their level best to kill [the Carl Rosa company] off altogether", withdrew its grant. The Carl Rosa Trust raised money privately, and promoted a month's season at the Prince's Theatre in 1960, but the company's final curtain descended after Don Giovanni on 17 September 1960. Sadler's Wells took over some of the company's members and many of its touring dates.

The new Carl Rosa Opera Limited was revived in 1997 under the artistic direction of Peter Mulloy. Since then, it has performed West End seasons and toured in the UK and internationally, offering a new repertoire of Gilbert and Sullivan, continental operettas and a few serious operas such as La bohème, often performed in the original languages. Recent conductors have included David Russell Hulme and Martin Handley. Directors include Timothy West.
