= Rose Hersee =

English operatic soprano (1845–1924)

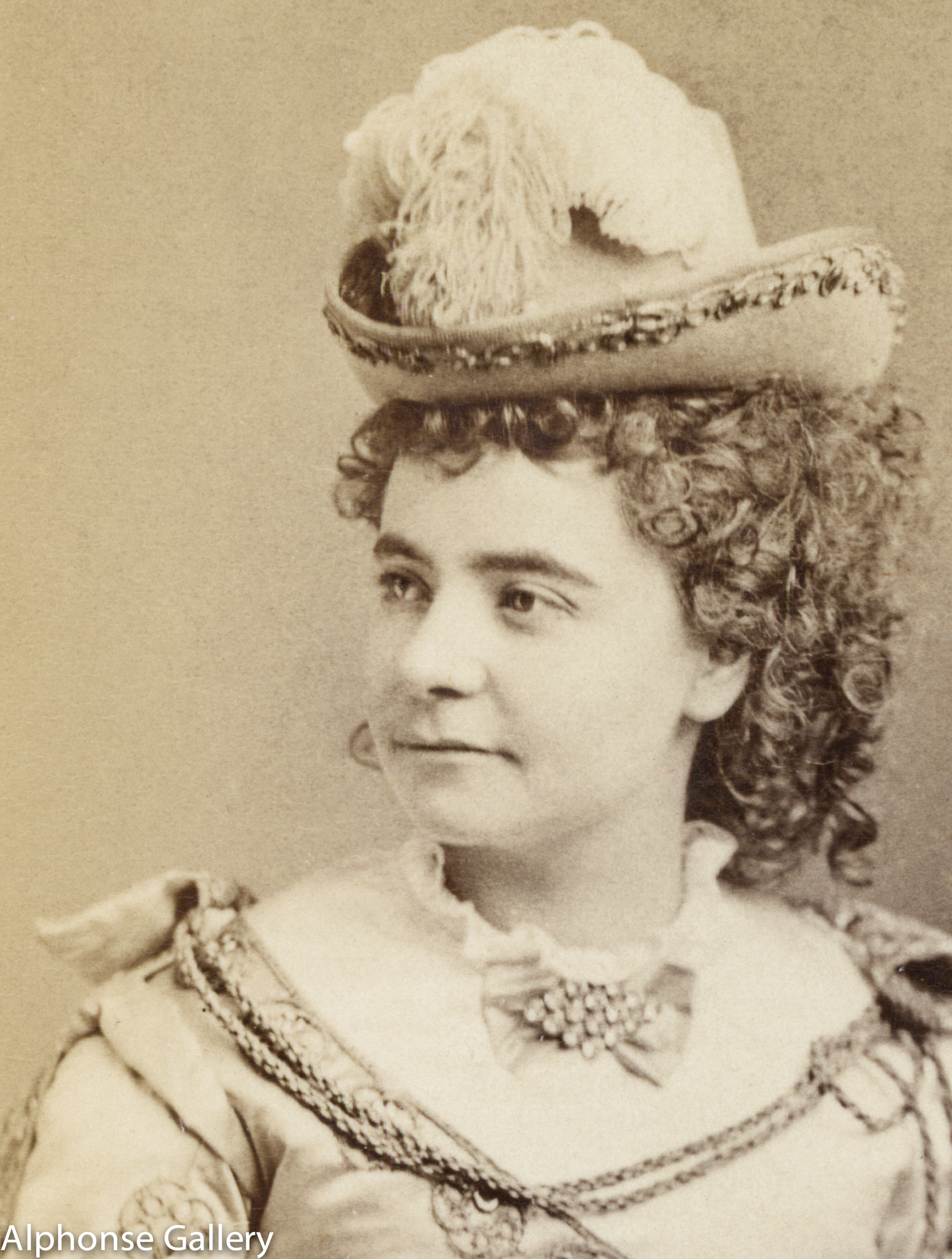
Rose Hersee in New York, c. 1875

Rose Hersee (13 December 1845 – 26 November 1924) was an English operatic soprano. She was a founder-member of the Carl Rosa Opera Company and later formed and performed in the Rose Hersee Opera Company.

== Biography ==
Hersee was the daughter of Henry Hersee (1820–1896), a teacher, critic for The Observer, librettist of Cowen's Pauline (1876), and translator of operas including The Merry Wives of Windsor, Carmen and Aida. She studied with her father and made her début at the age of 11 at the St. James's Hall, London.

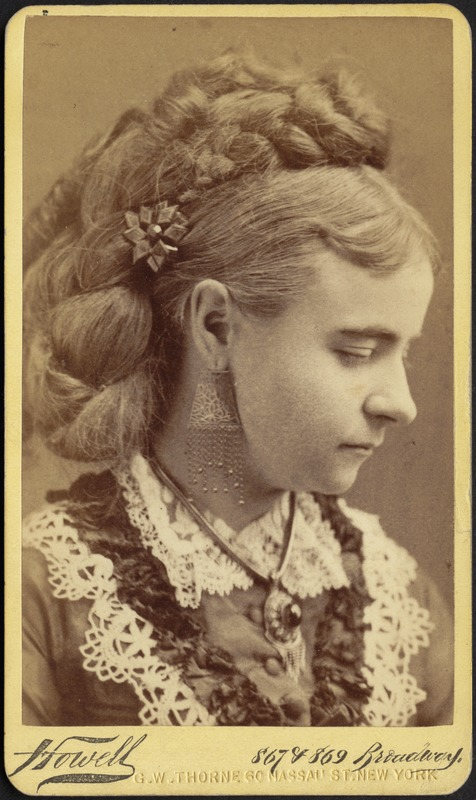
Hersee, ca. 1859–1870. Carte de Visite Collection, Boston Public Library

After singing small roles at Her Majesty's Theatre and Drury Lane in the early 1860s, including Adina in L'elisir d'amore, she toured the U.S. with the Parepa-Rosa Opera Company from 1865 to 1871. After her return to England, she was a founder-member of the Carl Rosa Opera Company, singing Susanna in its opening performance of Le nozze di Figaro at the Princess's Theatre in London, in September 1875, opposite Charles Santley. With the Crystal Palace company she repeated her Susanna opposite Blanche Cole as the Countess. In 1877, with her own company, Hersee repeated the role opposite Richard Temple, with Florence St. John as Cherubino. The Times, wrote in 1924 that her performance as Susanna in Figaro was still recalled as the best ever heard in the English language.

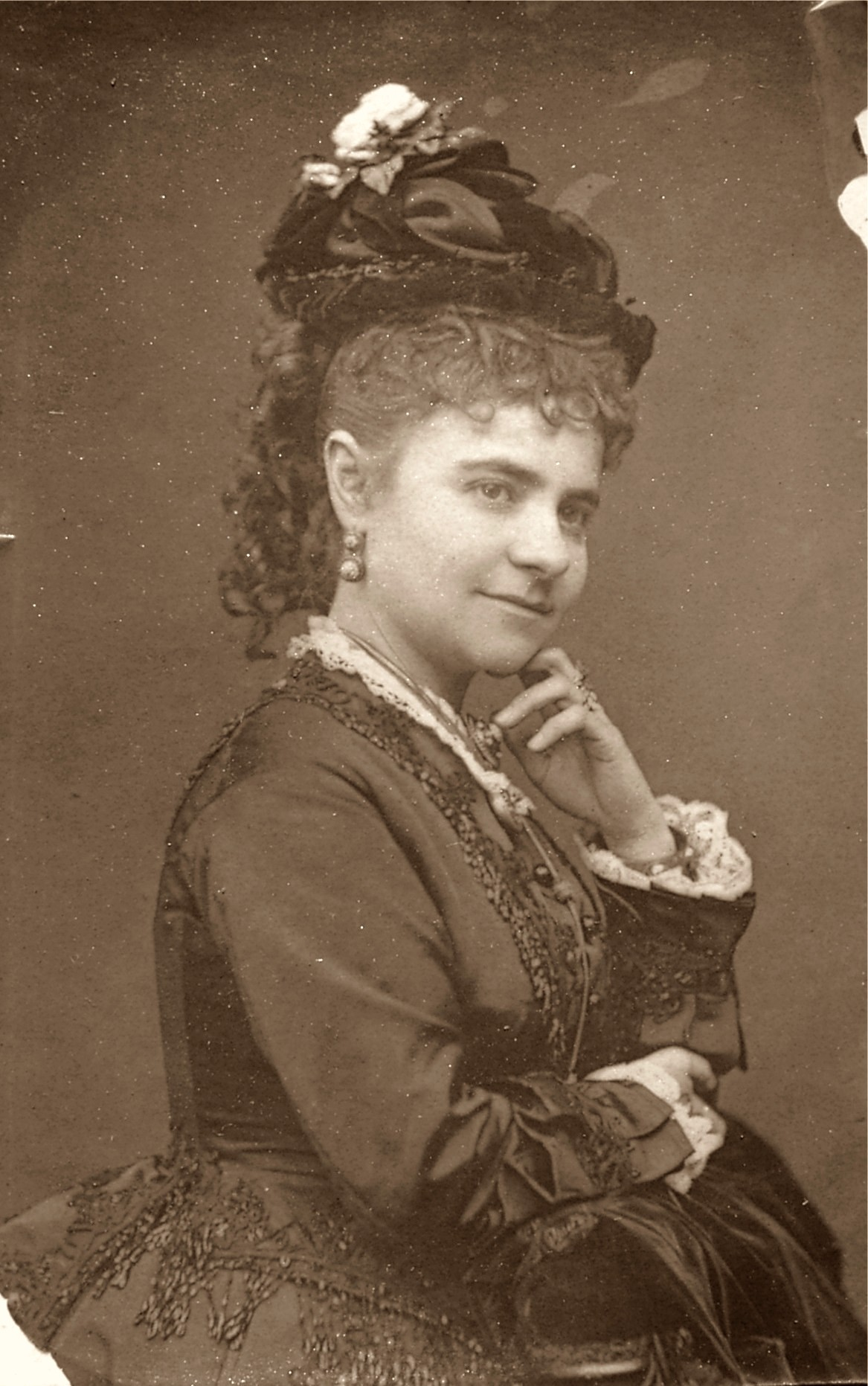
Rose Hersee

Hersee toured Australia in 1879, performing the title role in Carmen every night for three weeks in the opera's first Australian production. In 1884 she appeared in a season of opera in English at Covent Garden. In addition to opera, Hersee played in lighter musical shows, taking the title role in Hervé's Frivoli at the Theatre Royal, Drury Lane in 1886. She also appeared frequently at the Covent Garden promenade concerts and at the Crystal Palace. After retiring from the stage, she became a successful voice teacher.
