= Alice Esty (soprano) =

American-born operatic soprano

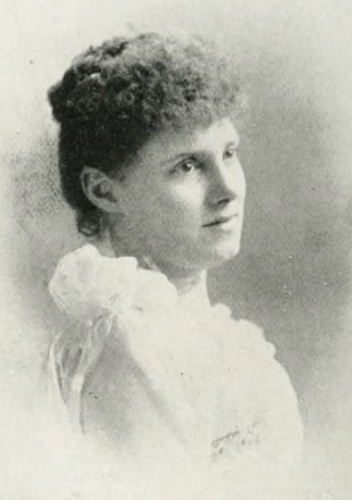
- "A Woman of the Century"
- Born: April 12, 1864; Lowell, Massachusetts, United States
- Occupation: Opera singer

Alice Esty (12 April 1864 – February 1935) was an American-born operatic soprano who spent most of her career based in England.

== Biography ==
Alice May Esty was born in Lowell, Massachusetts. Her first important musical engagement was a tour through the United States with the violinist Camilla Urso.

Following an attack of typhoid fever, she went to England for a change of scene and in 1891 decided to settle there. In that same year, she performed with the singer Adelina Patti at the Royal Albert Hall and then joined the Carl Rosa Opera Company, learning the lead roles for 10 operas in just seven months. Notable roles include Mimi in the first British staging of Giacomo Puccini's opera La Bohème (1897), Eva in the British premiere of Richard Wagner's opera Die Meistersinger von Nürnberg, and Effie Deans in the premiere of Hamish MacCunn's opera Jeanie Deans. She also sang in Charles Gounod's Faust, Georges Bizet's Carmen, Wagner's Lohengrin and Tannhäuser, and several other operas.

Besides touring with the Carl Rosa company through the 1890s, she had numerous concert engagements around the United Kingdom, singing with the Royal Choral Society, the Philharmonic Society, and other groups.

She continued singing into the 1910s, working with the Moody-Manners Opera Company as well as the Carl Rosa company. Around 1920 she began teaching in the Carl Rosa Opera Company's newly formed opera school.

She married the English baritone Alec Marsh in 1892.

Esty died in Farnham, Surrey, at the age of 70.
