= Barton McGuckin =

Irish tenor singer

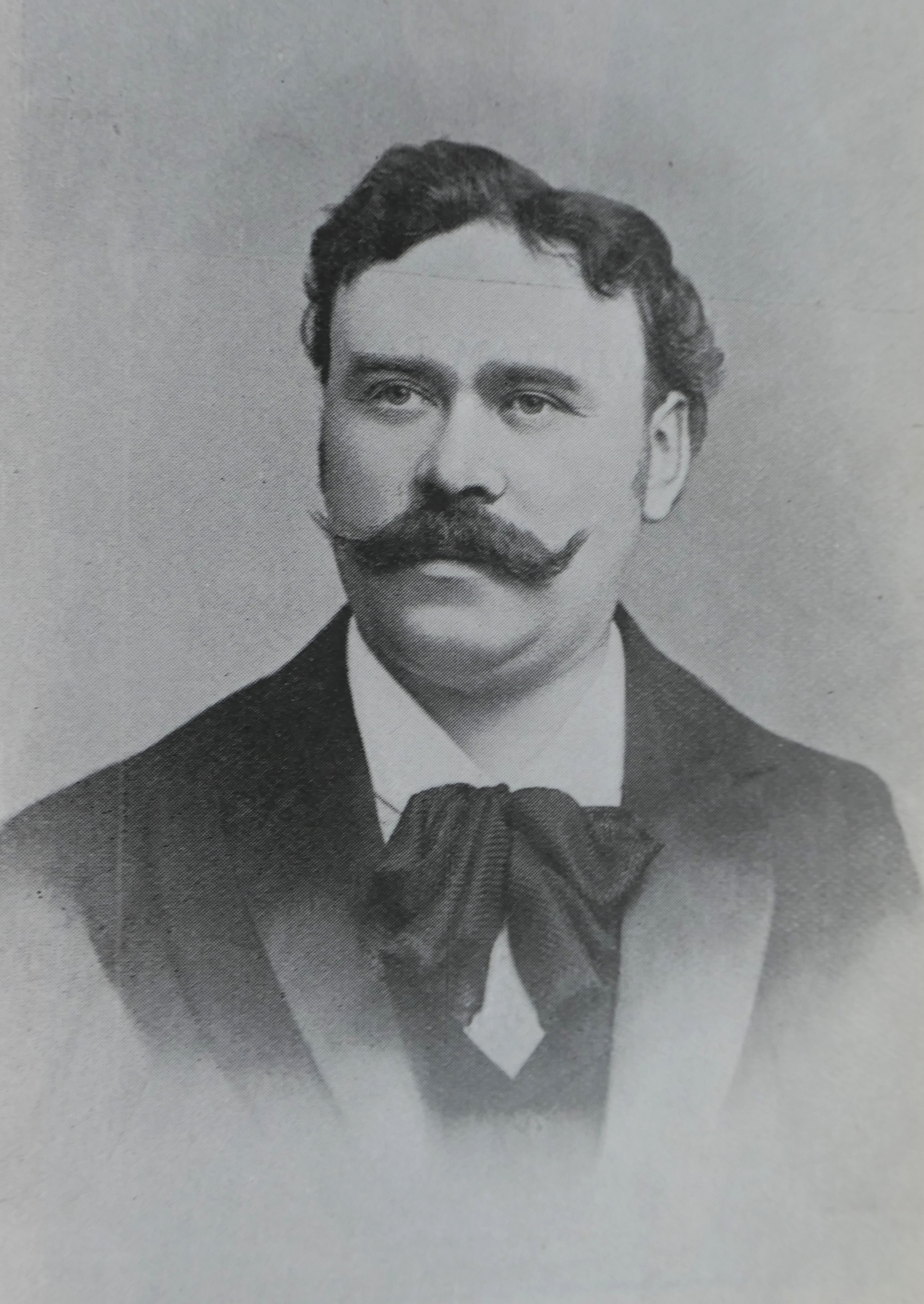
- Born: 28 July 1852; Dublin, Ireland
- Died: 17 April 1913 (aged 60); Stoke Poges, England
- Occupation: Operatic tenor

Barton McGuckin (28 July 1852 – 17 April 1913) was an Irish tenor singer of renown, who made his career principally in Britain with the Carl Rosa Opera Company, but also gained a wide success in oratorio and concert. Richard Ellmann put him forward as the model for Bartell D'Arcy in James Joyce's story "The Dead", but this identification has been questioned in recent years.

== Training and early days ==
McGuckin was born in Dublin and began studying music as a choirboy in Armagh Cathedral, where he received instruction in singing, organ, violin and pianoforte. In 1871 he became first tenor at St Patrick's Cathedral, Dublin and was a pupil of Joseph Robinson. He appeared in concerts from 1874, and made a debut at the Crystal Palace Concerts in 1875. He then went to study further at Milan, under Trevulsi.

== Career with Carl Rosa Opera Company ==
He made his stage debut with the Carl Rosa Opera Company in 1880, and remained with them at Theatre Royal, Drury Lane until 1887, singing in London and the provinces. He achieved great success, both for brilliant singing and for his acting. In this period he created several important roles, notably Phoebus in Arthur Thomas's Esmeralda (with Georgina Burns, Clara Perry, William Ludwig, Ben Davies (his operatic debut) and Leslie Crotty, in 1883; next Orso, the hero, in Alexander Mackenzie's Colomba, with Alwina Valleria and Franco Novara, again in 1883; then Waldemar in Thomas's Nadeshda, much acclaimed, with Alwina Valleria, Josephine Yorke and Leslie Crotty in 1885, and also Oscar in Frederick Corder's Nordisa in 1887. All were under the baton of Alberto Randegger and the artistic direction of Augustus Harris. In January 1885 he played Des Grieux in the first performance in England (at Liverpool) of Massenet's Manon, with Marie Roze. In 1887 and 1888, he visited the United States and sang in opera there.

In December 1888, McGuckin was back in London and appeared in the role of Manasseh at the Crystal Palace with the Novello's oratorio choir under Alexander Mackenzie in Hubert Parry's oratorio Judith, composed for the Birmingham Festival of that year. Corno di Bassetto heard it and found his singing in the Handelian manner rousing, but commented mainly on his poor diction, in reducing all vowel sounds to 'aw'. In May 1889 he was to sing Lohengrin with Lilian Nordica, Mme Fürsch-Madi and Francisco d'Andrade, but was indisposed and Antonio d'Andrade took his place under Sig. Mancinelli's baton.

After Carl Rosa's death, Augustus Harris made efforts to maintain the policy of developing the English school of composition, and at Easter 1890 made a renewed visit for the Carl Rosa company to Drury Lane. Frederick Cowen had produced his Thorgrim, based on an episode in the Icelandic tale of Viglund the Fair. It was produced in April with McGuckin, Zélie de Lussan and Frank Celli.

In June 1891 McGuckin sang on Selection Day in the Handel Festival under Sir August Manns at the Crystal Palace, performing "Waft her, angels" from (Jephta) (which he spoiled by holding the high note at the end too long, but otherwise had a very distinguished success with it) and "Love sounds the alarm" (which was "excellent"). In the same month Mrs Moore Lawson was Venus to his Tannhäuser in the first scene of that opera as presented in English at a concert of Hans Richter and was, according to Shaw, capable of holding his own with the majority of continental singers to whom he might be compared. Again in October 1891 at the Palace he sang "Lend me your aid" (Gounod) and some songs by Bemberg.

In January 1892, McGuckin was called in to sing Berlioz' Damnation of Faust in two concert performances in London given by the Hallé Orchestra, with George Henschel and Mrs Henschel as Mephisto and Marguerite:

Mr Barton McGuckin had to take Mr Lloyd's place, at the disadvantage of a very superficial acquaintance with a difficult part. His words were quite unintelligible; and in the invocation, at the very climax of the tremendous burst into C sharp minor, he altered the cadence in a way that robbed me of breath. I see no reason why Mr McGuckin should not some day make an excellent Faust – quite as good as Mr Lloyd, who is not at his best in the part – as soon as he learns it.

In early 1892, he was in a revival of Arthur Sullivan's Ivanhoe in the title-part, with Medora Henson as Rowena. This had been through several successful runs since its first production a year previously, and Richard D'Oyly Carte now produced it to alternate with André Messager's La Basoche, in which David Bispham made his London debut. But Ivanhoe had exhausted its drawing-power and was taken off almost at once. McGuckin's other principal roles were in Lohengrin, in Faust (Gounod), as Don José (Carmen) and Eleazar in Halévy's La Juive.

== Later career ==
McGuckin continued to sing into the early 20th century and made some recordings. He sang at Philharmonic and Monday Popular Concerts and at provincial festivals. In 1905, he became director of an amateur operatic society in Dublin and was conductor of orchestral concerts at the Irish Exhibition of 1908. He also became involved in the Royal Irish Academy of Music, Dublin. He died in 1913 in Stoke Poges.

== Bibliography ==
- A. Eaglefield-Hull: A Dictionary of Modern Music and Musicians (London: Dent, 1924).
- H. Klein: Thirty Years of Musical Life in London (New York: Century Co., 1903).
- H. Rosenthal and J. Warrack: Concise Oxford Dictionary of Music (London: OUP, 1974 printing).
- G. B. Shaw: Music in London 1890–1894, 3 vols. (London: Constable, 1932).
- G. B. Shaw: London Music in 1888–1889 as heard by Corno di Bassetto (London: Constable, 1937).
