= Medora Henson =

American opera singer

1896 sketch of Medora Henson.

Medora Henson (13 October 1857 – 14 April 1928) was an American-born soprano who later became a naturalized British subject through marriage. Born in Virginia and raised in Philadelphia, she began her career as a church singer and concert soprano in the early 1880s. By the mid 1880s she was singing with significant American orchestras like New York Symphony Society and the Boston Symphony Orchestra. In 1885 she married the American composer and cornetist Walter Emerson with whom she toured widely in concerts with the Boston Star Concert Company until their separation in 1891. During their marriage she was known as Medora Henson-Emerson or Mrs. Walter Emerson. This marriage ended in divorce in May 1893 shortly before Emerson's sudden death.

Henson married the pianist Waddington Cooke in England in August 1893, and was known thereafter as Mrs Waddington Cooke. In England she worked mainly as a concert and oratorio soprano. In 1891 she appeared as Lady Rowena in the original production of Arthur Sullivan's opera Ivanhoe. While this was the only staged opera she appeared in during her career, she also sang in concert versions of operas, and performed opera arias on the concert stage. She was highly active as concert singer in England during the 1890s and into the early years of the 20th century. Afterwords she worked as a voice teacher at the Royal College of Music and the Guildhall School of Music.

== Early life ==
The daughter of Rev. Dr. Poindexter S. Henson and his wife Amoret R. Henson (nee Rees), Medora Hooper Henson was born in Fluvanna County, Virginia on 13 October 1857. (Note: Some book sources have stated Medora's year of birth was 1861. However, this year does not match primary sources. Medora's marriage record to Waddington Cooke lists the name of her father, Poindexter Henson. The 1860 census record for Poindexter Henson and his household names Medora Henson as 2 years old which means she would have been born in either 1858 or 1857. Later census records in the United States for Medora Henson also confirm a birth in 1857/1858. Her exact date of birth of 13 October 1857 is published on page 442 in The Omohundro Genealogical Record which also gives her parents names.) She had one sister and five brothers. Her father was American by birth, but her mother was originally from Newport, Wales. She spent most of her childhood growing up in Philadelphia where her father served as the pastor of Memorial Baptist Church at the North East corner of Broad & Master streets. She was educated at Chestnut Street Female Seminary in Philadelphia where she graduated in 1875.

Henson studied music in Philadelphia with vocal pedagogue, composer, and conductor William Wallace Gilchrist. As early as April 1880 she was performing publicly in concerts as a singer at the Pennsylvania Academy of the Fine Arts. By November 1880 she was working on the music staff of Broadway Tabernacle in the Upper West Side of Manhattan as the resident soprano soloist.

== Early career ==
Henson's father left Philadelphia when he was appointed pastor of First Baptist Church of Chicago. In October 1881 she sang at the Grand Pacific Hotel in Chicago for the meeting of the Baptist Social Union and subsequently sang an evening recital. By April 1882 she had moved to Chicago and quickly became well known for performing at events related to the Baptist Church. On April 20, 1882 she was a soloist with The Beethoven Society of Chicago at Central Music Hall in what was billed as a her Chicago debut. One of her fellow soloists at the concert was baritone George Henschel; a singer with whom she would later study singing in Boston beginning in the Fall of 1882.

In June 1882 Henson returned to Pennsylvania where she performed in four recitals with pianist Emil Liebling. By the end of July 1882 she was working as the resident soprano at Chicago's Immanuel Baptist Church where she was employed for two months. She then went to Boston to study singing, but returned briefly to Chicago in December 1882 to sing once again with the Beethoven Society as the soprano soloist in Verdi's Requiem. Later that month she joined with Liebling again to give a concert at Chicago's Chickering Hall. By June 1884 she was a voice student of baritone George Sweet in New York City.

In early 1885 Henson was the soprano soloist in Handel's Messiah in separate performances with the New York Symphony Society (NYSS) and conductor Walter Damrosch at Plymouth Church, Brooklyn, and with the Handel and Haydn Society at Boston Music Hall. She returned to the Pennsylvania Academy of Fine Arts in January 1885 to give a joint recital with baritone Max Heinrich (1853–1916). The following month she and Heinrich reprised their concert program at the Metropolitan Opera House with The New York Times review praising her singing of Franz Schubert's Die junge Nonne, D. 828 and Robert Schumann's song cycle Frauen-Liebe und Leben. Soon after she became the resident soprano at Washington Avenue Baptist Church in Brooklyn.

In May 1885 Henson sang with the NYSS, the Oratorio Society of New York (OSNY), and Damrosch at New York's Academy of Music as the soprano soloist in Verdi's Requiem. The following July she made her European debut at St James's Hall in London performing Alberto Randegger's Medea under the baton of Leonhard Emil Bach.

== Marriage to Walter Emerson and the Boston Star Concert Company ==
Walter Emerson

On September 14, 1885 Henson married cornetist and composer Walter Emerson in Philadelphia. The following month she sang Felix Mendelssohn's concert aria Infelice, Op. 94 with the Boston Symphony Orchestra, and was a soloist with the Germania Orchestra and her husband at Philadelphia's Academy of Music. After this she and her husband went on tour with Emma Nevada's concert company. Medora's performances with this group included performing the parts in multiple oratorios by Handel; including the role of the Israelitish Woman in Judas Maccabaeus, and all of the soprano roles in Samson. She ended the year working again as a soloist in Handel's Messiah; this time with conductor Arthur Mees and the chorus of the Cincinnati May Festival.

In 1886 Henson and her husband toured as members of the Boston Star Concert Company (BSCC) under the management of Ozias W. Pond. The BSCC gave concerts through the American South and in the American Mid-West for much of that year. Alone, Medora reunited with the NYSS, the OSNY, and Damrosch in February 1886 to perform the role of Marguerite in Berlioz's La Damnation de Faust with Max Alvary singing the title role. She repeated Berlioz's Marguerite in November 1886 with the Apollo Chorus of Chicago and baritone William Ludwig as Méphistophélès and Charles A. Knorr as Faust. When not touring she worked as a soprano at First Church in Boston. In 1887 she and her husband performed with the BSCC on separate concert tours through the American Mid-West and to Canada. The BSCC membership at this point included the composer and pianist Rudolf King.

In 1888 Henson and her husband once again toured through the American South with the BSCC; also giving some performances in New England. They continued to tour nationally with the BSCC in 1889 and 1890. In the 1890-1891 season Henson and her husband toured with the Hanlon-Volter and Martinetti-English Pantomime with Medora using the billing Dora Emerson for this production. By March 1891 they had completed their obligations with this show, and left for Europe to give concerts in London, Paris, and Berlin. In London the couple were both soloists with the resident orchestra at The Crystal Palace in concerts led by conductor August Manns in May 1891.

In late May 1891 Walter Emerson returned to the United States without his wife to fulfill concert engagements in America, while he wife remained in London for further performances at the Crystal Palace. While parted, Medora performed in London concerts with the English pianist and composer Waddington Cooke (1868–1940). In May 1893 Walter Emerson obtained a divorce from his wife after claiming in a court proceeding that she was having an affair with Cooke, and had caught them being intimate. Emerson died suddenly in early June 1893; just days after his marriage to Medora had been finalized. Medora married Waddington Cooke in August 1893.

While primarily active in England during her later career, Henson returned to the United States for performances on two occasions of note. In July 1893 she performed with the Chicago Symphony Orchestra led by Theodore Thomas at the World's Columbian Exposition; including performances of Berlioz's Requiem and Handel's Judas Maccabaeus. In 1896 she returned to the Cincinnati May Festival to sing to part of the Angel of Love in Edgar Tinel's oratorio Franciscus with Ben Davies in the title part.

== Life and career in England ==
=== Early 1890s ===
Henson's early performances in England impressed Arthur Sullivan which led to work light opera. She occasionally performed the part of Lady Rowena in the original production of Sullivan's opera Ivanhoe in 1891, alternating with Lucille Hill and Esther Palliser for performances at the Royal English Opera House. Her foray into opera was brief and she subsequently returned to concentrating on work as a concert and oratorio soprano. She continued lessons with Alberto Randegger in London, as well as in Italy, Germany and France.

By December 1891 Henson had joined the concert company of Dutch flautist and conductor Edward de Jong for performances of Mozart's Requiem at Free Trade Hall to mark the centenary of that composer's death. On New Years Day 1892 she was a soloist in Handel's Messiah with the Royal Choral Society (RCS) at Royal Albert Hall (RAH) under conductor Joseph Barnby. Several more performances with the RCS at RAH followed including singing Elsie in Sullivan's The Golden Legend (January 1892), and as a soloist in Felix Mendelssohn's St. Paul (February 1892). In March 1892 she was a soloist in Gounod's La rédemption at the Great Hall, Tunbridge Wells in a performance led by Frederick Hunnibell; repeating this same work with the Middlesbrough Musical Union (MMU) in April 1892. That same month she performed the title role in Hubert Parry's Judith at Plymouth Guildhall with the Plymouth Vocal Association, and was a soloist in Cowen's St John's Eve with Joseph Cox Bridge and the Chester Musical Society.

Henson composed the song "Angel's Lullaby" which was published by Cramer & Co. in May 1892. In June 1892 she sang at a special musical soiree at the London gentleman's organization, the Meistersingers Club, for a special rare event that women could also attend, and the following month she sang in a concert at London's Portman Rooms on Baker Street with her husband as her accompanist. In September 1892 she sang with the Bangor Choral Union at the National Eisteddfod of Wales as a soloist in Mendelssohn's Elijah under conductor Roland Rogers.

In November 1892 Henson repeated Parry's Judith with the Blackburn Philharmonic Society; sang under conductor Brand Lane in Judas Maccabaeus in a return to Free Trade Hall (FTH); and sang Sullivan's Elsie again with the Worcester Festival Choral Society. The following month she sang Marguerite to Iver McKay's Faust in Berlioz's La Damnation de Faust with the MMU; sang the parts of Gabriel and Eve in Haydn's The Creation with the Ripon Choral Society; repeated Mendelssohn's St. Paul with the Cleckheaton Philharmonic Society; was a soloist in Verdi's Requiem with the Sunderland Philharmonic Society at Victoria Hall; sang again under Brand Lane in Handel's Messiah at FTH; and performed in a Christmas concert at London's St James's Hall. She also sang in a Messiah performance given on Boxing Day, 1892 with the Birmingham Festival Choral Society and conductor William Stockley.

In January 1893 Henson returned to FTR to perform in Mendelssohn's Elijah with Andrew Black in the title part, and sang in the premiere of David Jenkins's oratorio Dewi Sant (sung in English under the title David and Saul). Other works she sang with English choruses and orchestras in 1893 included solo parts in Rossini's Stabat Mater, Niels Gade's Erl King's Daughter, Op.30, Schumann's Paradise and the Peri, Heinrich Hofmann's Melusina, and reprisals of many of the concert works she had performed in earlier. She sang another Elijah that year with baritone Charles Santley taking the title part with the Cheltenham Festival Society, and performed with fellow American Belle Cole in Verdi's Requiem with the Belfast Philharmonic Society. In April 1893 she sang the title role in Joseph Barnby's Rebekah with the composer conducting the Cardiff Musical Society. The following month she performed excerpts from the part of Alice Ford in Falstaff as part of a lecture-concert given by Alexander Mackenzie at the Royal Institution.

In November 1983 Henson returned to Royal Albert Hall to sing a concert with Charles Hallé and the Hallé Orchestra (HO). and sang the role of Juliette in a concert version of Charles Gounod 's opera Roméo et Juliette at Plymouth Guildhall. The following month she performed a concert opera arias with the HO at Huddersfield Town Hall. She performed with the HO again in Franz Liszt's rarely performed oratorio The Legend of Saint Elizabeth in Manchester in February 1894. The following month she repeated Haydn's The Creation at the Coventry Cathedral. In April 1894 she starred in the premiere of Tigrino Salvati's Talmatha with the Richmond Orchestral Society. She soon after sang Elsie in Sullivan's The Golden Legend at several festivals including the 1894 Chester Triennial Music Festival, and repeated The Creation at the Norfolk and Norwich Festival.

In October 1894 Henson was a soloist in George Alexander Macfarren's St John the Baptist with the Huddersfield Choral Society, and repeated Barnby's Rebekah with the Bradford Old Choral Society. The following month she repeated Elijah with the Hull Philharmonic Society. In December 1894 she joined with her husband to perform in a concert of ballads at Queen's Hall (QH), and also gave a recital with him at the Salle Érard in London. She also appeared at the QH that month in a concert with the London Symphony Orchestra in which she sang the aria "Dich, teure Halle, grüss' ich wieder" from Richard Wagner's Tannhäuser.

=== Late 1890s ===
In 1895 she was a soloist once again in Handel's Messiah at the Leeds Festival with Sullivan conducting. In 1897 she was a soloist in Bach's Mass in B minor with the The Bach Choir for that chorus's Bach Festival at QH. In 1898 she created the soprano part in the world premiere of Edward Elgar's Caractacus at the Leeds Festival. She repeated this work with the Royal Choral Society at Royal Albert Hall in 1899. She also sang it at the Gloucester and Sheffield Festivals.

In 1898, she toured with Edvard Grieg, singing his songs. When she retired from public performances, she taught privately and at the Royal College of Music and the Guildhall School of Music. One of her students was Clytie Hine.

In Christmas 1927 Henson had a serious fall in which she dislocated her left shoulder. She died on 14 April 1928 at her flat in Bedford Court Mansions in London.
