= Theo Marzials =

Anglo-French poet and eccentric

Théophile-Jules-Henri "Theo" Marzials (20 December 1850 – 2 February 1920) was a British composer, singer and poet. Marzials was described in 1894 as a "poet and eccentric" by parodist Max Beerbohm, and, after writing and performing several popular songs, vanished into obscurity. His poetry is seen as an example of 19th-century aestheticism.

== Background ==
Marzials's father, Antoine-Theophile Marzials, was the pastor of the French Protestant Church of London and had been a clergyman before visiting London in 1839. While there he met Mary Ann Jackson (Marzials's mother) and the couple married. Theo was the youngest of their five children. He was educated at Merchant Taylors' School His brother, Frank Marzials, was a prolific author of poetry, essays, and biographies and an accountant general in the army; he was knighted in 1904.

In 1870 Marzials started work at the British Museum as a junior assistant in the librarian's office. There he would work with Coventry Patmore, John Payne, Arthur O'Shaughnessy, and Edmund Gosse, with whom he would form a particularly close friendship.

== Poetry ==
In 1873 Marzials's only published collection of poetry was released, The Gallery of Pigeons and Other Poems, which included the anthologised love poem "A Fragment" ("And then it seem'd I was a bird...") It also includes A Tragedy, an unusual poem that has often been called the worst ever written in the English language. The poem has been chosen as the worst ever by Ross and Kathryn Petras in the 1997 book Very Bad Poetry and by the Not Terribly Good Club of Great Britain along with many other writers and critics. However, Ford Madox Ford called the collection "by far the most exquisite ... by any of the lesser Pre-Raphaelite poets". Other poems by Marzials featured in The Yellow Book, an important literary periodical of the late 19th century. Gerard Manley Hopkins described Marzials's "Rondel" as having "an art and finish rare in English verse".

John M. Munro edited a selection of Marzials's poems and had them published in 1974. He referred to him as "interesting rather than significant, a literary curiosity, perhaps, rather than a neglected genius."

== Music ==
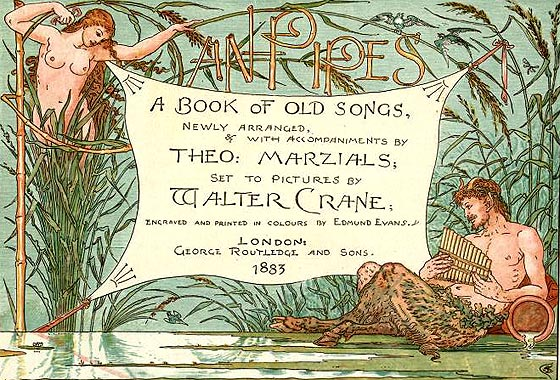
The cover of Marzials's songbook Pan Pipes

Marzials later spent much of his time as a composer and in 1883 released Pan Pipes, which coupled his music with the work of Christina Rossetti and the illustrations of Walter Crane. The most successful of his songs was 1878's "Twickenham Ferry", which was well received in both England and America, and a musical version of Algernon Charles Swinburne's poem "Ask Nothing More of Me, Sweet", which became one of the most popular ballads of the 1880s. Marzials socialized with composer Mary Augusta Wakefield, who also set Swinburne's work to music. Around the same time, Marzials collaborated with Alberto Randegger as a librettist on Arthur Thomas' Esmeralda, an opera based on the character of the same name from Victor Hugo's 1831 novel The Hunchback of Notre-Dame.

== Eccentric behaviour ==
Marzials's behaviour was often seen as eccentric and unusual, and he often gave impromptu performances of his works. He is quoted as saying "Am I not the darling of the British Museum reading room?" while inside that same silent room. Marzials worked at the British Museum until his retirement at the age of 32, after which he received a pension of £38 a year. This was supplemented by royalties from his published work which were estimated at around £1000 annually.

The relationship between Marzials and fellow author Edmund Gosse is debated, with some claims that their relationship was more than platonic. Marzials retired to Colyton, Devon in the early 1900s where he became addicted to chlorodyne. He died there in February 1920.

== See also ==
- William McGonagall, reputed to be the worst poet in history
