= Thorgrim =

Opera in four acts with music by Frederic H. Cowen

Thorgrim is an opera in four acts with music by the British composer Frederic H. Cowen to a libretto by Joseph Bennett after the Icelandic tale "Viglund the Fair", first performed at the Drury Lane Theatre, London, on 22 April 1890. The premiere cast included the mezzo-soprano Zélie de Lussan and the tenor Barton McGuckin.
