= Esmeralda (Thomas) =

Opera in four acts composed by Arthur Goring Thomas

- Opera by Arthur Goring Thomas
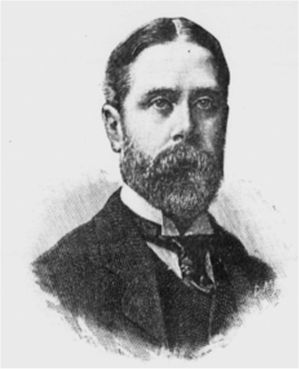
- The composer in 1892
- Librettist: Theo Marzials; Alberto Randegger
- Language: English
- Based on: Victor Hugo's The Hunchback of Notre-Dame
- Premiere: 26 March 1883; Theatre Royal, Drury Lane, London

Esmeralda is an opera in four acts composed by Arthur Goring Thomas to an English-language libretto by Theo Marzials and Alberto Randegger based on Victor Hugo's 1831 novel The Hunchback of Notre-Dame. It premiered in London on 26 March 1883 at the Theatre Royal, Drury Lane with Georgina Burns in the title role and Barton McGuckin as her lover, Phoebus.

== Background ==
Esmeralda was Thomas's first opera to receive a full staging. He dedicated it to Pauline Viardot. It was commissioned by the Carl Rosa Opera Company following a very successful performance of excerpts from his opera The Light of the Harem in 1879 at the Royal Academy of Music where he was a student at the time. Alberto Randegger (the musical director of the Carl Rosa company) and the eccentric British poet Theo Marzials co-wrote the libretto. Its subject, Esmeralda, a central protagonist in Victor Hugo's novel Notre-Dame de Paris (The Hunchback of Notre-Dame), had already been the focus of several earlier operas, including Louise Bertin's La Esmeralda (1836), Alexander Dargomyzhsky's Esmeralda (1847), and Fabio Campana's Esmeralda (1869).

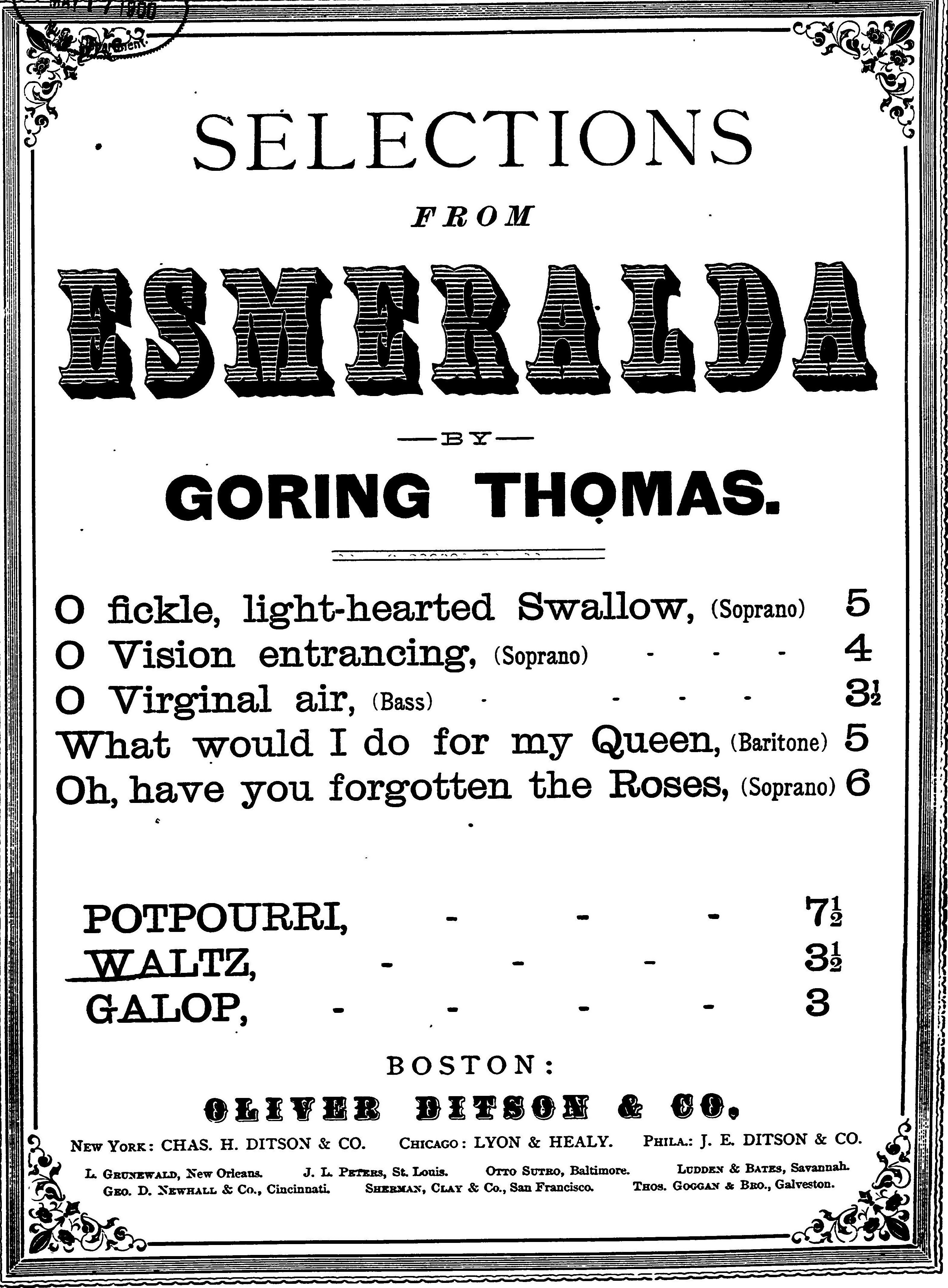
Selections from Esmeralda, sheet music published by Oliver Distson & Co., 1883

In the tragic denouement of Hugo's original novel, Esmeralda dies on the scaffold. However, Marzials and Randegger's libretto gave the story a happy ending, a decision heavily criticised in a review of the premiere published in The Theatre:

That Esmeralda and Phoebus should get married at the close of the fourth act, and live happily for ever after, is all very well from the school-girl novel-reading point of view; but, as a new ending to Notre Dame de Paris, it appears to me no less revolting than impertinent.

== Performance history ==
The premiere of Esmeralda was staged by the Carl Rosa company on 26 March 1883 at London's Drury Lane Theatre in a performance conducted by Alberto Randegger. It was given its Scottish premiere at the Theatre Royal, Edinburgh in November of that year, and over the next two decades proved to be popular both in London and in British provincial theatres. It was performed in German translation in Cologne and Hamburg in 1885, and was revived in Scotland in 1886 when it was toured to multiple theatres. In 1888, the opera reached Australia, where it was staged in Melbourne by Amy Sherwin and her company of singers. A revised version of Esmeralda was performed in a French translation of the libretto by Paul Milliet at the Royal Opera House in London on 12 July 1890 with Jean de Reszke as Phoebus and Nellie Melba in the title role. The revised version was also performed in English for the US premiere at the Metropolitan Opera House in New York City on 19 November 1900. The following month the same company staged Esmeralda in Chicago at the Auditorium Theatre.

An attempt by the Carl Rosa company to revive Esmeralda in 1908 at the Royal Opera House drew very small audiences. It eventually fell into obscurity, although individual arias and the ballet music from the opera were performed at 33 separate Henry Wood Promenade Concerts between 1895 and 1930. There are no complete recordings of Esmeralda, but Webster Booth recorded its main tenor aria, "O Vision entrancing", in 1944 with the Liverpool Philharmonic Orchestra conducted by Malcolm Sargent. An earlier recording of the aria sung by Thomas Burke to a piano accompaniment appears on The Record of Singing, Volume 3 (1926-1939). The baritone aria "What would I do for my Queen?" was included on a double-LP Opera Viva issue devoted to British opera, sung by Mark Hoffman with the Orchestra of Opera Viva conducted by Leslie Head.

== Roles ==
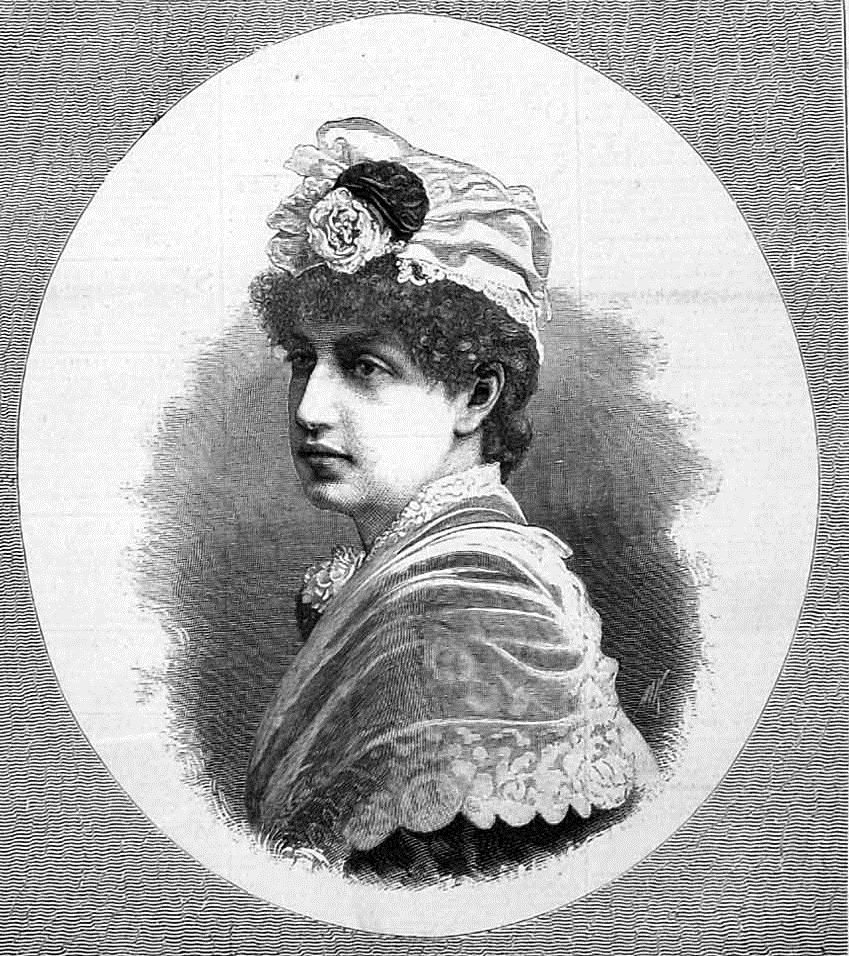
Georgina Burns (1860–1932), Esmeralda in the 1883 premiere

Roles, voice types, premiere cast
Role	Voice type	Premiere cast, 26 March 1883 Conductor: Alberto Randegger
Esmeralda, a Gypsy girl	soprano	Georgina Burns
Phoebus de Châteaupers, captain of the king's archers	tenor	Barton McGuckin
Claude Frollo, Archdeacon of Notre-Dame Cathedral	baritone	William Ludwig
Quasimodo, a hunchback, adopted son of Frollo	baritone	Leslie Crotty
Fleur-de-Lys, betrothed to Phoebus	soprano	Clara Perry
Pierre Gringoire, a poet, married to Esmeralda	tenor	Ben Davies
Lady Lois, governess to Fleur-de-Lys	mezzo-soprano	Leah Don
Clopin, King of the Beggars	baritone	G. H. Snazelle
Marquis de Chevreuse	baritone	J. H. Stilliard
Gypsies, beggars, party guests

== Synopsis ==
Setting: Paris in the 15th century

Act 1

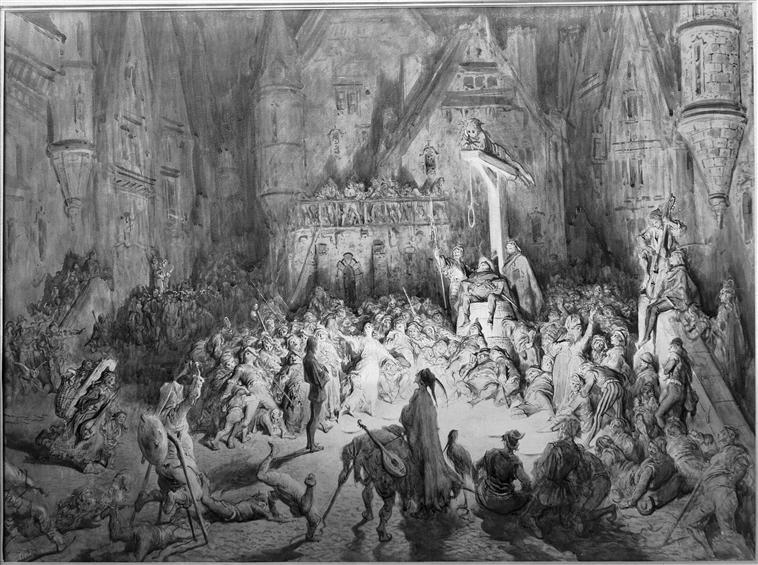
The Court of Miracles depicted in an illustration by Gustave Doré for The Hunchback of Notre-Dame

In a Paris slum (Court of Miracles), the poet Gringoire has been surrounded by a mob of beggars who threaten to kill him unless he marries one of the crowd. Esmeralda, a Romani dancing girl steps forward and offers to marry him, but stipulates privately to him that the marriage will be in name only. Meanwhile, Claude Frollo, the Archdeacon of Notre-Dame Cathedral, has fallen in love with Esmeralda. He arrives at the Court of Miracles and attempts to carry her off with the help of the hunchback Quasimodo, his adopted son. She is rescued by Phoebus, a captain in the king's archers, and the pair immediately fall in love. Frollo manages to escape. Quasimodo is captured, but then freed on the entreaties of Esmeralda. and vows his eternal devotion to her.

Act 2

At the house of Fleur-de-Lys, who is betrothed to Phoebus, a gathering is underway. Away from the crowd of guests, Phoebus soliloquizes on his love for Esmeralda. She then appears outside the house dancing in the street with a band of Romani. When Fleur-de-Lys invites her inside, Esmeralda and Phoebus recognize each other and he declares his love for her in the presence of Fleur-de-Lys and her guests. Fleur-de-Lys is distraught.

Act 3

Gringoire arrives at Esmeralda's garret demanding his marital rights, but she drives him away with her dagger. Frollo and Quasimodo then arrive in another attempt to abduct Esmeralda. They conceal themselves on hearing Phoebus approaching. When Frollo hears Esmeralda and Phoebus declaring their love for each other, he stabs Phoebus. The crowd rushes in, and Frollo accuses Esmeralda of the stabbing. She is carried off to prison.

Act 4

Esmeralda is in prison and about to be burned at the stake. Frollo approaches and tells her that he will have her pardoned if she takes him as her lover. She refuses. Then Phoebus and Gringoire arrive. Frollo, enraged that her innocence can now be proven, tries to kill Phoebus again, but Quasimodo throws himself in front of Phoebus, and is stabbed by Frollo. Quasimodo dies and Frollo is arrested. Esmeralda and Phoebus are joyfully reunited.

== Principal arias ==
- "'What would I do for my Queen?" (Quasimodo)
- "O fickle, light-hearted swallow" (Esmeralda)
- "O vision entrancing" (Phoebus)
- "O virginal air" (Frollo)
- "O, have you forgotten the red, red, roses?" (Fleur-de-Lys)
