= G. H. Snazelle =

English singer and raconteur (1848–1912)

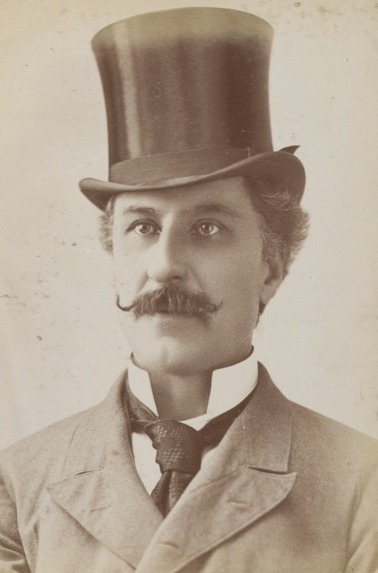
- Snazelle c. 1870-1900

Background information
- Born: 1848; Sydenham, Surrey, England
- Died: 1912 (aged 63–64); Stockwell, London, England
- Occupation(s): Baritone singer, comic entertainer

George Harry "Snazzy" (Note: No connection with "snazzy" meaning "excellent" or "stylish", for which the OED gives a much later (1932) US origin.) Snazelle (1848 – 17 May 1912) was an English singer and raconteur who enjoyed a great popularity in Australia.

== History ==
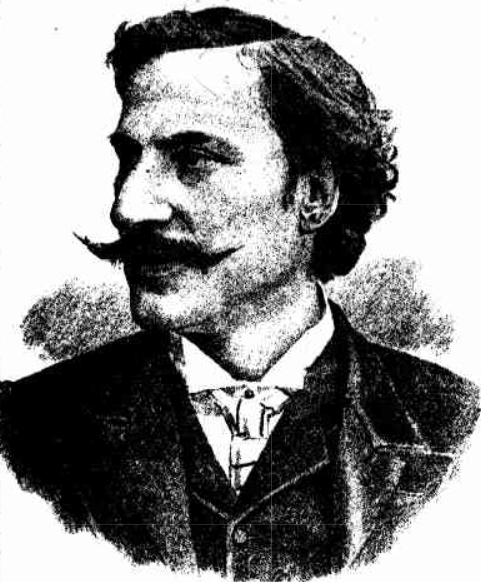
G. H. Snazelle

Born George Henry Snazel in Sydenham, Surrey in 1848 or London in 1850, by his own account the son of a Jewish carpenter (". . . just like Jesus"). This may have been one of his jokes, as elsewhere his father is described as an architect and surveyor, and Snazelle as training for the same career. He sang part-time while working as a bank clerk for Herries and Farquhar, later absorbed by Lloyds Bank, but had ambitions for a stage career, so resigned when he landed a position with Carl Rosa that suited his powerful baritone voice. He played with the company for nine years as second baritone, on a salary of £5 per week. Early parts were the King of Spain in Maritana, Devilshoof in Wallace's The Bohemian Girl, Sir John Falstaff in Otto Nicolai's Merry Wives and Mephistopheles in Gounod's Faust. His first roles in new works were Clopin in Goring Thomas's Esmeralda in March 1883 and Geoffrey in Villiers Stanford's The Canterbury Pilgrims in April 1884. He also "created" the role of Bobadillo in Julia Woolf's Carina at the London Opera Comique in 1888.

Whatever his merits as an operatic singer, his fame rested on his stage appearances as a monologist and raconteur. Two pieces are noteworthy: "How Bill Adams Won the Battle of Waterloo" and "(My Awful) Experiences with a Whistler", which he must have recounted hundreds of times in every part of the world, and have been revived many times since. One of his boasts was that he had sung Gounod's Nazareth in a dozen different languages.

== Australia ==
Snazelle was brought out to Australia by F. E. Hiscocks aboard the Garonne in August 1889 as a one-man entertainment at the Athenaeum Hall, Melbourne entitled Music, Song and Story, sharing the stage with Henry Hawkins.

In 1890 George Musgrove brought to Australia the Nellie Stewart Company production of Robert Planquette's musical Paul Jones, with Marion Burton as Jones, Snazelle as Bouillabaisse and George Leitch as "the insect" Petit Pierre. The hit song of the piece was Two Mariners Bold. He was brought to Sydney in October by John Solomon, proprietor of the Criterion Theatre, where his show was entitled "Music, Mirth, Song and Story". He returned to Melbourne in time for the Christmas season, having changed his management to R. Miller Brechin. He alternated between Hobart, Launceston an Melbourne in the first months of 1890. Then followed a period of perhaps eighteen months when he was solely occupied with operatic work, broken briefly over Easter 1891 for a series of concerts in Melbourne, after which he took a break in Tasmania. He resumed his "Music, Song and Story" concerts in Melbourne in July 1891, then spent October, November and December in Adelaide before returning to Melbourne and Tasmania.

In August 1893 he left for a world tour beginning with South Africa He was accompanied by Mrs Snazelle, a son Lionel Snazelle, and a kangaroo, which he intended presenting to Sir Henry Loch; also R. Gourlay, J. Truegold and M. Mackmunro. While in London for his daughter's wedding he presented a few concerts at the Egyptian Hall to good houses. He then made a tour of Canada and America and returned to England in mid-1895. Among other work he received during this time was a new opera, The Scarlet Feather, adapted from Lecocq's La petite mariée and produced by Williamson and Musgrove at the Shaftesbury Theatre. The cast included Nellie Stewart, Florence Young, Decima Moore, Joseph Tapley, and George Snazelle, all old Sydney favorites. A great number of Australians were in the first night audience.

After an absence of six years, Snazelle returned by the mail steamer Orizaba, arriving at Fremantle on 27 December 1900 and Melbourne a few days later. Rather than a theatre troupe, he brought with him a cinematograph projector and crew and a copy of the film Life in Our Navy, a documentary on life on board HMS Jupiter made by G. West and Son of Southsea, England, advertised as 60,000 feet of film and over a million frames. Its first showing was at the Athenaeum Hall, Melbourne on 26 January 1901. The film toured the east coast of Australia, including five weeks in Sydney. At each screening "Snazzy" provided additional entertainment. He returned to London at the end of September 1901.

Snazelle made one last visit to Australia with the National Opera Company for George Musgrove from 29 August 1908, appearing in The Bells of Corneville, Maritana and other favorites at the Theatre Royal, Melbourne and Criterion Theatre, Sydney to uneven reviews, and the tour was curtailed. A critic mourned the decline of the great artist, hinting at an addiction to drink.

=== Character ===
Snazelle was above all else a supreme egotist, and generally affable, but when crossed had a violent temper, which would also manifest itself when preparing himself for the part of Mephistopheles.

=== Last days ===
Snazelle's last appearance on the London stage was as Mr Dixon, the aging circus proprietor, in a revival of The New Clown (source of the film) in 1906. He also served for a time as singing tutor at the Guildhall School of Music.

Snazelle suffered from a painful illness in his last few months, and died at his home, 1 Stockwell Park Crescent, London SW.

== Bibliography ==
Snazelleparilla (1898). The book, a collection of anecdotes picked up in Australia, sold rather poorly, and was lampooned for its lack of originality by E. G. Murphy ("Dryblower"):

Why chafe against the exile's chain, though fast our lives it's cooping ?
For here, across the mighty main, old friends to-day are trooping;
Some old and bent — some deadly dull — some sharp as banderilla —
Some drawn from out a misty age, but all must help to fill a page
In thee — Snazelleparilla.
Oft have we met them by the fire, beneath the scented gum,
Where seasoned swagmen fear inspire within the guileless chum;
O'er tropic seas that curl and dance from York to far Manilla
Full many a yarn has ceased to roam to find at last a peaceful home
In thee — Snazelleparilla.
From Kosciusko, cold and grey, to Hell's twin-brother, Bourke,
We've met the yarns that here to-day within your pages lurk;
Where high the willy-willy rears its dread cyclonic pillar,
We march again with dogged tramp to reach each yarn-infested camp
In thee — Snazelleparilla.
So welcome, ancient comrades all, strike root secure and deep,
Obedient to the Master's call, the Rubicon you leap;
From bush and plain you come to cheer baronial hall and villa,
Through summer's sun and winters gloom perennial shall the chestnut bloom
To thee — Snazelleparilla.

== Family ==
Snazelle was married twice, and had two sons by the first. His second wife accompanied him to Australia.

- Lionel J. "Ensign" Snazelle ( – ) was a banker and investor in Coolgardie, Western Australia
- Oswald Snazelle (c. 1870 – )
  - Oswald Snazelle jr (c. 1890 – )
- Mabel Eleanor Snazelle married Arthur Redmond Pilkington in London on 7 May 1894
