= Cour des miracles =

Historic slum district in Paris

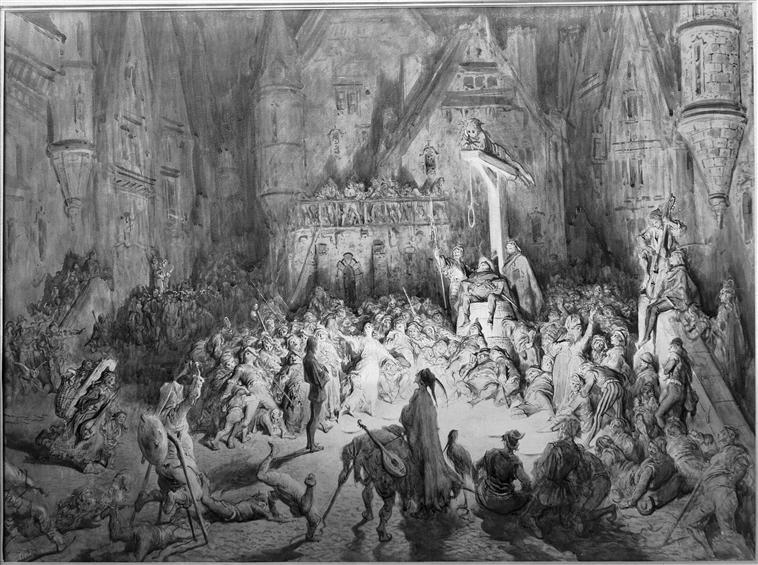
The cour des miracles as imagined by Gustave Doré in an illustration to The Hunchback of Notre-Dame.

Cour des miracles (French pronunciation: [kuʁ de miʁakl], "court of miracles") was a French term which referred to slum districts of Paris, France where the unemployed migrants from rural areas resided. They held "the usual refuge of all those wretches who came to conceal in this corner of Paris, somber, dirty, muddy, and tortuous, their pretended infirmities and their criminal pollution." The areas grew largely during the reign of Louis XIV (1643–1715) and in Paris were found around the Filles-Dieu convent, Boulevard du Temple, the Cour de la Jussienne (Jussienne Street)), Reuilly Street, Rue St. Jean and the former site of the Hôtel des Tournelles, Échelle Street and between the Cairo Street and Réaumur Street. The latter served as inspiration for Victor Hugo's Les Misérables and The Hunchback of Notre-Dame.

== Name ==
In pre-modern Paris a large portion of the population relied on begging for its survival. Since those with a clear handicap could expect more alms, a number of beggars faked or exaggerated disabilities and diseases. By the time they came back to their homes in the slum, they dropped their acts. A beggar who had pretended to be blind or crippled the whole day could see or walk again once back in the slum. This phenomenon gave the generic name to these areas where so many "miracles" occurred every day: courts of miracles.

== Culture ==
Regularly the people of the Court of Miracles were thought to have organized a counter-society devoted to crime and thievery with its own hierarchy and institutions. The archissupots were meant to be former University of Paris students in charge of teaching the secret slang (argot) to the new recruits. The relationship between outlaws and the student world in the 17th century – a time of crisis – has however commonly been observed. The 17th-century historian Henri Sauval claimed that the area was "a great cul-de-sac which was stinking, muddy, irregular and unpaved." He argued that the area had its own language and a subculture of crime and promiscuity: "everyone lived in great licentiousness; no one had faith or law and baptism, marriage and the sacraments were unknown."

== Clearance ==
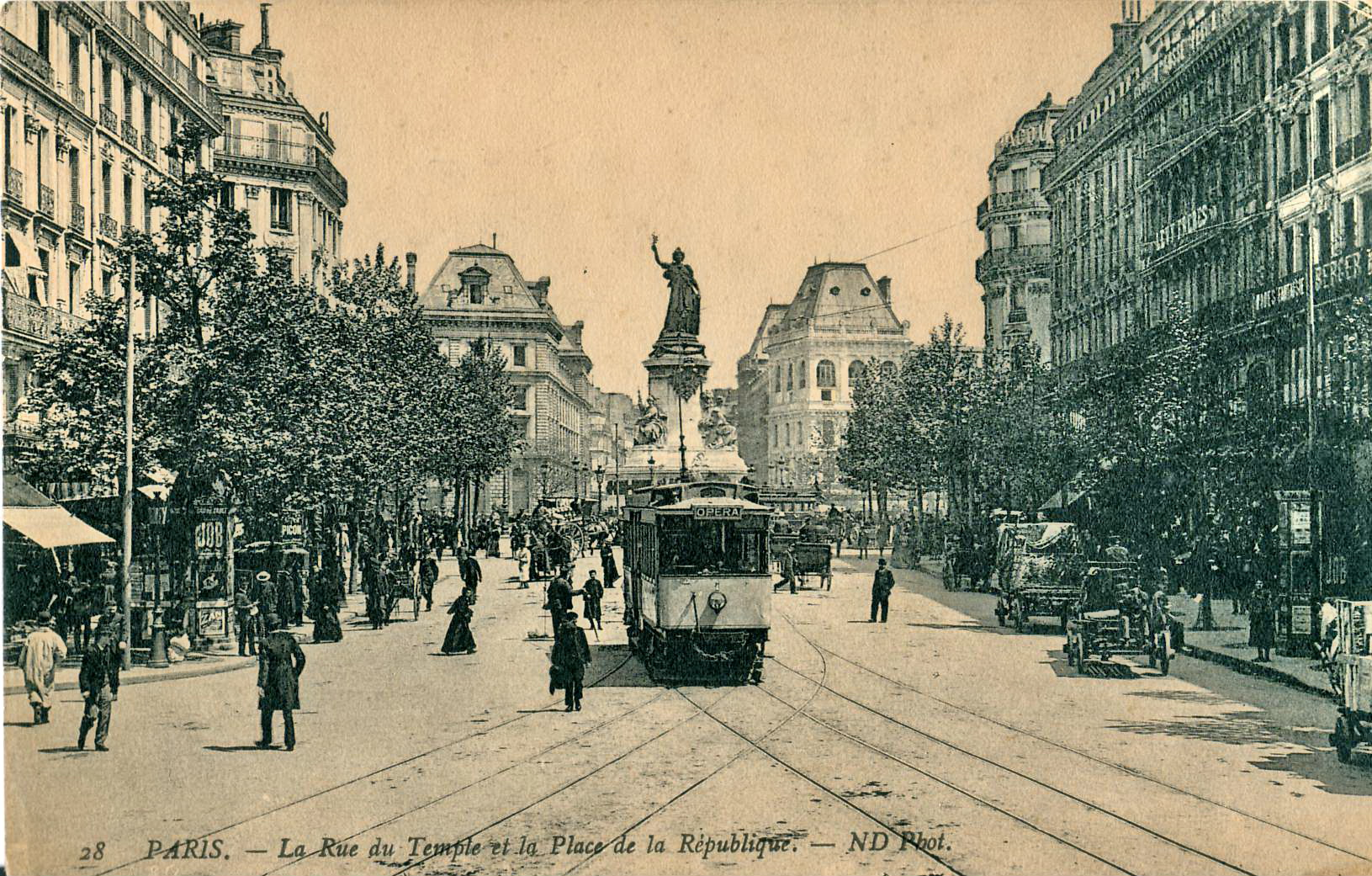
The Rue du Temple as it appeared after Haussmannisation.

As crime and destitution worsened, Parisian authorities sought to reduce these areas. Gabriel Nicolas de la Reynie was tasked in 1667 with utilizing the fledgling Prefecture of Police to curb the growth of crime in the areas. By 1750, a new tactic of improving health and social care became prominent over law enforcement, and as great areas of the slums were demolished they were taken over by fishmongers and blacksmiths. The last vestiges of the old cours des miracles were eliminated with the redevelopment of the Filles-Dieu site during the French Revolution and Haussmann's renovation of Paris in the 19th century."

== Contemporary culture ==
Cour des miracles (Greek: Η αυλή των θαυμάτων) is one of the most important contemporary Greek theater plays written by Iakovos Kambanellis and performed for first time in Athens during 1957–1958. The play projects the life stories and relationships of a group of neighbors in the working-class neighborhood of Vyronas in Athens that are facing displacement from their humble housing units surrounding a courtyard due to a new building project that the landlord initiated.

The Court of Miracles was the main setting for the S01 E05 episode of the 2014 BBC drama series The Musketeers, entitled The Homecoming.
