= George Leitch =

English actor-manager and dramatist

George Leitch ( – May 1907) was an English actor-manager and dramatist who had a substantial career in Australia.

== History ==
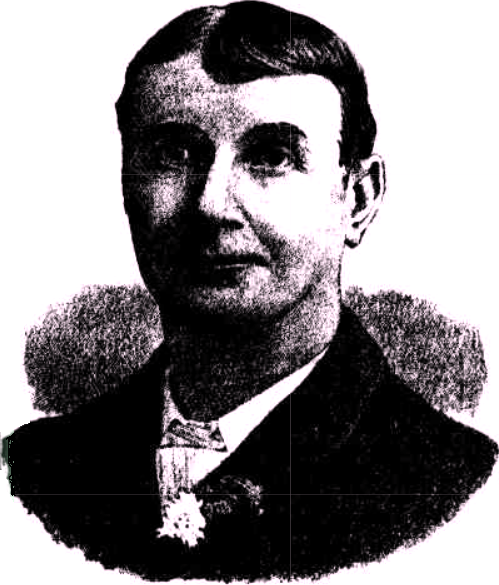
George Leitch

Born George Ralf Walker in London, Leitch was educated and trained as a civil engineer, following in his family's footsteps. He did some work in this line in the coal-mining districts of South Staffordshire, but he was a comic at heart and longed to go on the stage. His first foray in the field was unfortunate, as the company in which he was playing failed, but he dared not go back to the family with his tail between his legs. By a stroke of luck he was able to join a Shakespearean company by taking the place of a man named Leitch, and hence his stage name. This company also failed, disappearing with their costumes and props before they could be seized by the bailiffs. His first real engagement was with Charles Calvert at the Prince's Theatre, Manchester, which lasted several years, and his work was complimented by Ilma de Murska. He became a stock comedian at Brighton, playing alongside many of the stars of the day — Sims Reeves, Charles Matthews, Barry Sullivan, John Lawrence Toole, Walter Montgomery, Adelaide Neilson, Ada Cavendish, to mention a few. His first appearance in London was at the Standard Theatre, as Rene in The Two Orphans, with William Rignold and the Olympic company. His first West End appearance was in The Shaughraun at the Theatre Royal, Drury Lane as a replacement for Dion Boucicault when the great actor was called away urgently, and F. B. Chatterton, who had only met Leitch briefly, gave him his big chance.

=== Writer and producer ===
Leitch contributed articles to the Manchester Courier, whose editor Allen gave him much encouragement, and it was in Manchester and Liverpool that he wrote his play Sithors to Grind, which he produced in London two years later, receiving warm reviews from John Oxenford of The Times. He formed a company to tour Sithors to Grind, and other original plays: The Improvisatore, based on Hans Christian Andersen's autobiographical novel, Uncle Zac, The Coming D - -, Money Down, A Touch of the Sun, Old Times, and Those Girls. In Australia, he would write Wanda for the Majeronis, Pearl Diver, The Librarian (adapted from Gustav von Moser's Der Bibliothekar), (Note: This farce was also adapted by Charles Hawtrey in 1884 as The Secretary.) The Madman, and an adaptation of T. A. Browne's For the Term of His Natural Life which he finished writing in Hobart, having visited some of the places in which it was set. Possibly his last work, The Land of the Moa, was largely written in New Zealand in 1895, and was revived in that country on many occasions.

=== Australia ===
He brought Sithors to Grind to Australia, playing first at the Princess Theatre, Melbourne under contract to Williamson, Garner and Musgrove. When that combination disbanded Leitch joined Musgrove's comic opera company, playing at the Melbourne Opera House.

In December 1884 Leitch went into partnership with "the indefatigable little George MacMahon" and his brother James, taking a lease on the Theatre Royal, Hobart. He brought the Majeronis to Hobart and secured rights to Called Back, (Note: The thriller Called Back was written by "Hugh Conway" and adapted by J. Comyns Carr) Joseph Derrick's Confusion, The Private Secretary, Youth by Merritt and Harriss, The Lights o' London, and Moths. (Note: Henry Hamilton's adaptation of the Ouida novel of the same name)

They toured Australia's eastern States and New Zealand with The Silver King 1885–1886. During the tour they brought out His Natural Life, a stage version of T. A. Browne's novel For the Term of His Natural Life, which opened on 26 April 1886 at the Theatre Royal, Brisbane, followed by Adelaide 29 May 1886, Sydney 5 June 1886, Melbourne 26 June 1886.

Inigo Tyrrell (or Tyrrell-Weekes, real name Frederick Weeks) wrote a play For the Term of His Natural Life, copyright registered 15 June 1886 and applied for an injunction preventing Leitch's version from being performed at Theatre Royal, Melbourne. The injunction was not issued. Of the two authors, Leitch was the only one to seek permission from Clarke's widow, and the only one to enter a royalty agreement.

The MacMahon Leitch Company disbanded in Auckland at the end of their New Zealand tour and the principals took a holiday in Fiji. They then successfully sued Wellington Evening Post and the Press Association for publishing a report implying they had left Hamilton with debts unpaid.

He suffered an accident while playing Sims and Pettitt's Harbor Lights in Ballarat, January 1889, and with consequent illness took many months to recover.

He joined the Nellie Stewart Opera Company in 1890, playing "Petit Pierre", "The Insect" in Farnie's Paul Jones as a foil to G. H. Snazelle's Bouillabaisse, their song Two Mariners Bold being memorable.

He was in New Zealand early in 1895 working on a new play, The Land of the Moa, which opened 24 July 1895 at the Wellington Opera House, and was well received, then toured through Auckland, Christchurch and Dunedin before being first staged in Sydney on 19 October at the Theatre Royal.

Leitch brought leading actors Arthur Dacre and his wife "Amy Roselle" out from England in January 1895, to play lead roles in Land of the Moa and other pieces. Their lives were cut short in a murder-suicide on 17 November 1895. It appears that Dacre shot his wife while she slept, then cut his own throat with a razor. They were due to open in The Silence of Dean Maitland at the Theatre Royal the following evening. The Dacres, a devoted couple, had been given little time to prepare for their parts in the play. Leitch closed the theatre for the week.

Leitch left Australia around June 1897. There was no announcement, no farewell.

== Select credits ==
- Hands Up (Leitch play)
