= The Book of Heroic Failures =

Book written in celebration of human inadequacy in all its forms

- Author: Stephen Pile
- Publication date: 1979

The Book of Heroic Failures, written by Stephen Pile in 1979, is a book written in celebration of human inadequacy in all its forms. Entries include William McGonagall, a notoriously bad poet, and Teruo Nakamura, a soldier of the Imperial Japanese Army who fought for Japan in World War II until 1974.

The original edition included an application to become a member of the Not Terribly Good Club of Great Britain; however, this was taken out in later editions because the club received over 20,000 applications and closed in 1979 on the grounds that, "Even as failures, we failed" (but not before Pile himself had been expelled from it for publishing a bestseller). The American version of the book was misprinted by the publishers, who left out half the introduction. As a consequence, later versions of the book came out with an erratum slip longer than the entire introduction. In his second book, The Return of Heroic Failures, published in 1988, Stephen Pile reports that Taiwanese pirates were not aware of this and did not include the erratum slip. The second book was published in the USA under the title Cannibals in the Cafeteria.

The second book came out in Greece in 1992, despite the first book not being released in the country. In fact, this second book was named "Η ΤΕΧΝΗ ΤΗΣ ΑΠΟΤΥΧΙΑΣ No1" (The Art of Failure No. 1). A small erratum slip in the book itself explains that it was a mistake. In an interview with English Radio DJ Andrew Marshall, Pile said "The Book is one of the least successful books ever issued in the USA, I don't think it has reached double figures there as yet and long may that remain the case."

In 1999, Penguin made the decision to republish the book as part of their "Penguin Readers" series to encourage reading from a young age.

A third volume, The Ultimate Book of Heroic Failures, was published by Faber and Faber in 2011, and a selection from the first two volumes (the author's last ever word on the subject of heroic failure) was published in 2012.

== Notable failures by chapter ==
The World of Work

- Daniel Price
- Tommy Cooper
- Francis Webb
- William Stern
- MV Argo Merchant
- Mariner 1
- Edsel
- Caproni Ca.90

Off Duty

- English as She Is Spoke
- Arthur Paul Pedrick
- Robert South
- Jude the Apostle
- George Plimpton

Law and Order

- James Berry
- Joseph Samuel

Playing the Game

- Thomas Birch
- Maurice Flitcroft
- The Boat Race 1912
- Rafael Gómez Ortega
- Beltrán Alfonso Osorio, 18th Duke of Alburquerque
- Horatio Bottomley

The Cultural Side of Things

- Florence Foster Jenkins
- Portsmouth Sinfonia
- William McGonagall
- Julia A. Moore
- George Wither
- Margaret Cavendish, Duchess of Newcastle-upon-Tyne
- Wicked Bible
- World Government Party
- John Warburton
- Person from Porlock
- Le Bateau
- Robert Coates

War and Peace

- Ambrose Burnside
- Antonio López de Santa Anna
- Anglo-Zanzibar War
- Hiroo Onoda
- Teruo Nakamura
- HMS Trinidad (46)
- Mitrailleuse
- Sticky bomb
- Lunge mine
- Anti-tank dog
- USS Swordfish (SSN-579)

The Business of Politics

- Charles D. B. King
- Assassination attempts on Fidel Castro

Love and Marriage

- Augustus II the Strong

The Art of Being Wrong

- Dionysius Lardner
- The Beatles' Decca audition
- John Sedgwick

== Books ==
- Pile, Stephen (1979). The Book of Heroic Failures: Official Handbook of the Not Terribly Good Club of Great Britain. Futura. ISBN 978-0-7088-1908-1.
- Pile, Stephen (1988). The Return of Heroic Failures. Secker & Warburg. ISBN 978-0-436-37351-0. Published in the USA as Pile, Stephen (1989). Cannibals in the Cafeteria. Harper & Row. ISBN 978-0-06-016283-2.
- Pile, Stephen (2011). The Ultimate Book of Heroic Failures. Faber and Faber. ISBN 978-0-571-27728-5.
- Pile, Stephen (2012). The Not Terribly Good Book of Heroic Failures. Faber and Faber. ISBN 978-0-571-27733-9, a selection from the first two volumes.
