= Putnam Griswold =

American opera singer

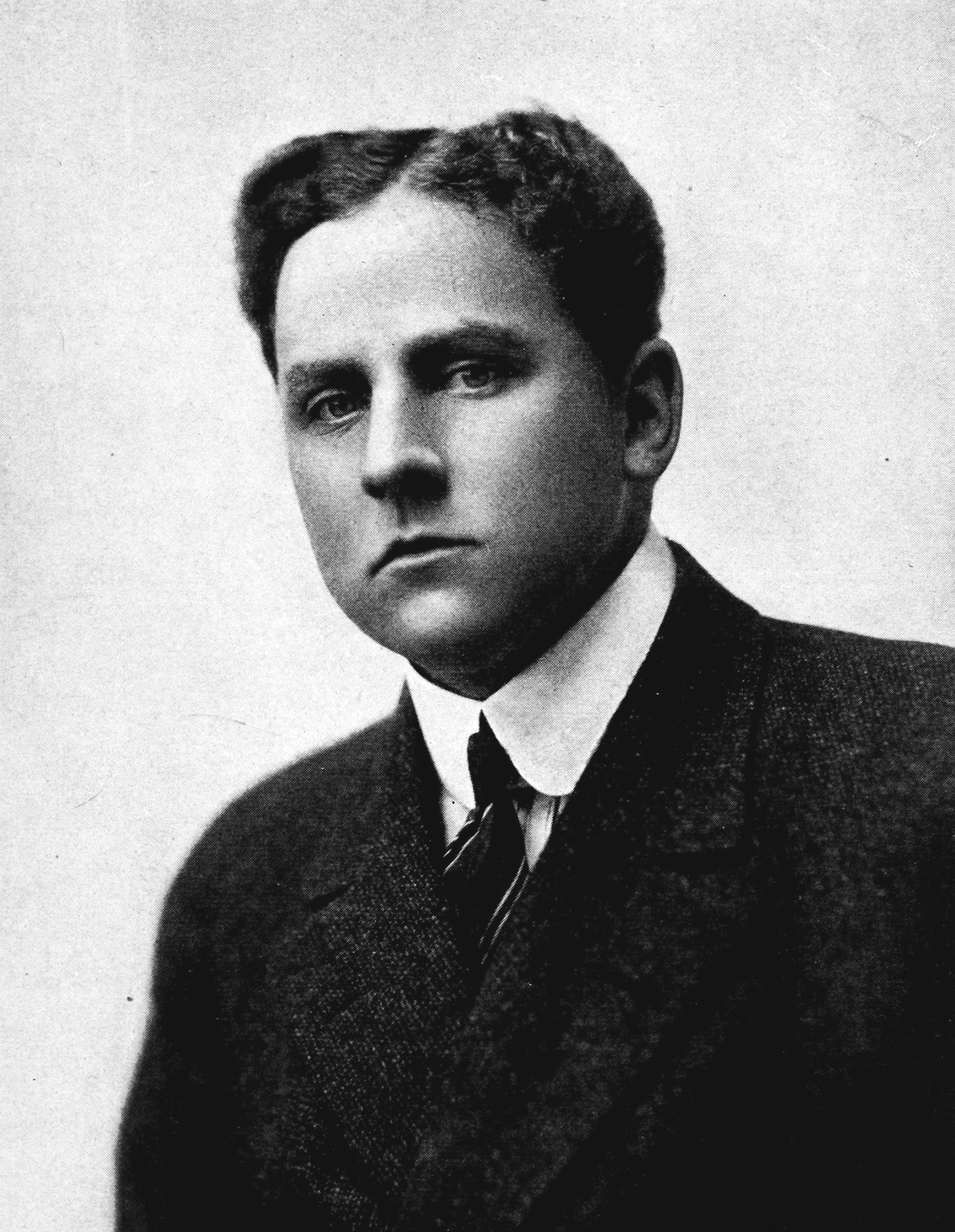
Putnam Griswold

Putnam Griswold (1875 – February 26, 1914) was an American opera bass singer.

== Early life and education ==
Born in Minneapolis, Minnesota, in 1875, Griswold originally followed a business career. At the age of 22 he discovered his voice and began to study with a local teacher in California.

In 1900 he went to London, where he was for two years a pupil of Alberto Randegger at the Royal College of Music. During the winter of 1902/03 he studied under Bouhy at Paris, the next winter under Julius Stockhausen at Frankfurt; and finally he completed his studies with Emerich at Berlin in 1905.

== Career ==
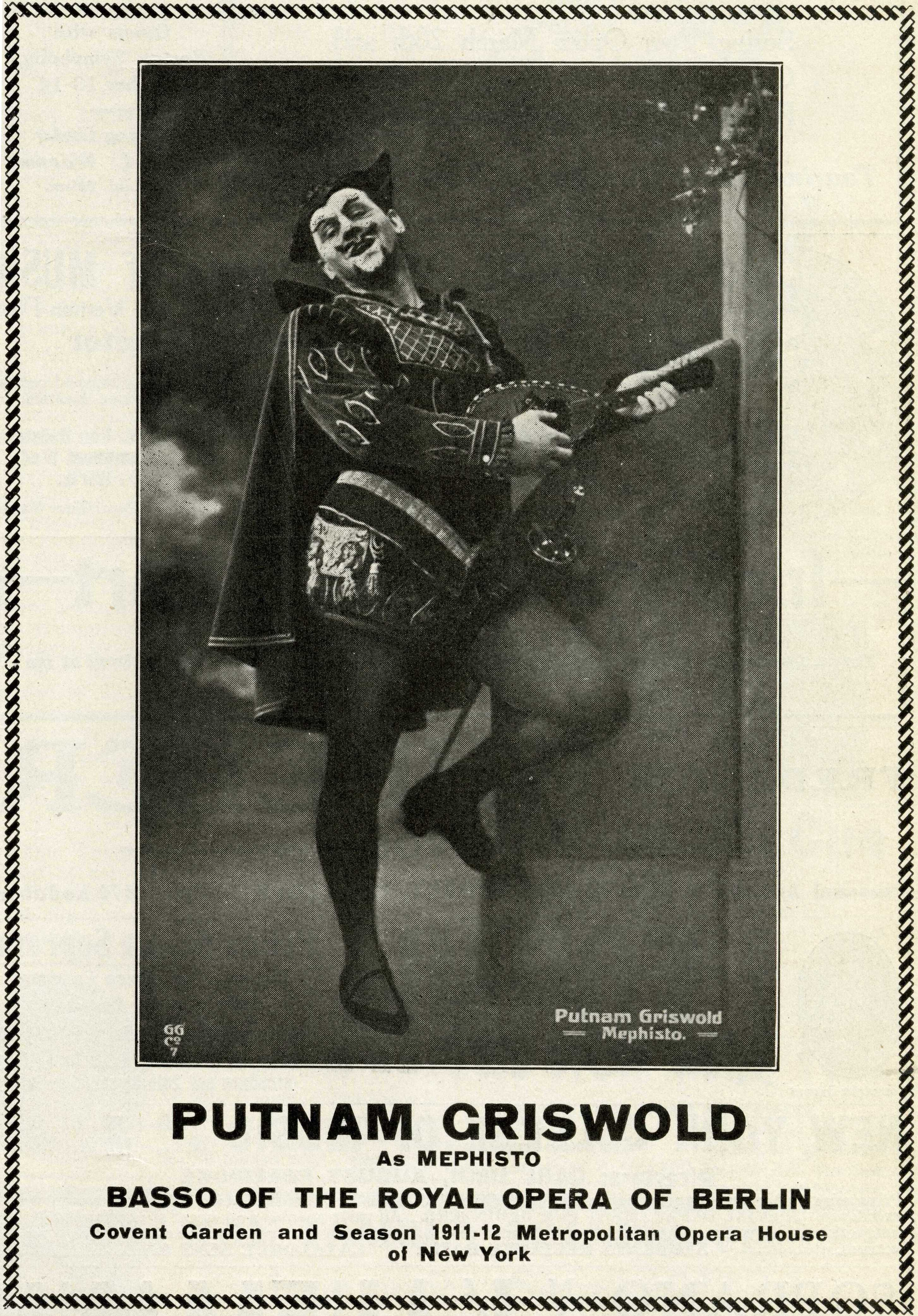
Griswold as Mephisto

His operatic début took place at the Royal Opera House, Covent Garden, London, in 1901. During the summer of 1904 he sang at the Royal Opera in Berlin. After having sung the role of Gurnemanz in Savage's production of Parsifal in America (1904–1905), he became in 1906 a regular member of the Berlin Opera. There he remained, appearing also as guest in various German cities, until he came to the Metropolitan Opera House in 1911, where through his interpretation of Wagner's heroes, he immediately won over the public and critics.

Griswold was the first American bass to sing the great Wagner roles at the Metropolitan, where he was compared with the most distinguished of his foreign predecessors. He had been a prime favorite in Berlin, where the critics had praised him as the greatest foreign interpreter of Wotan and he was twice decorated by Emperor William (Kaiser Wilhelm).

== Death ==
He died in the winter of 1914 while working for the Metropolitan Opera. His sudden death due to an attack of appendicitis—came as a shock to his numerous admirers. Following his death, German Emperor Wilhelm II conveyed his gratitude to Mrs. Griswold for sending him a medallion of her husband portraying Hagen in Wagner's Götterdämmerung.
