= Arthur Goring Thomas =

English composer

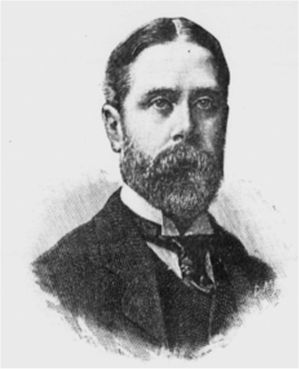
Arthur Thomas, 1892 portrait

Arthur Goring Thomas (20 November 1850 – 20 March 1892) was an English composer. Thomas was a younger brother of the cricketer Freeman Frederick Thomas and the civil servant Charles Inigo Thomas, During the 1870s, he received a musical education in Paris and at the Royal Academy of Music. He was commissioned to write the opera Esmeralda (1883), an adaptation of Victor Hugo's 1831 novel The Hunchback of Notre-Dame. By the early 1890s, this opera had received adaptations in the German and French languages. By the time of his death, Thomas had completed at least four other operas, including an opéra bouffe which was released posthumously.

In 1891, Thomas was engaged to be married. In March 1892, he took his own life by throwing himself in front of a train. His suicide was attributed to an unspecified "mental disease".

== Life ==
He was the youngest son of Freeman Thomas and Amelia Frederick, daughter of Colonel Thomas Frederick. His elder brothers included Freeman Thomas, a noted cricketer who was the father of Freeman Freeman-Thomas, 1st Marquess of Willingdon, Viceroy of India; and Sir Charles Thomas.

He was born at Ratton Park, Sussex, and educated at Haileybury College. He was intended for the Civil Service, but delicate health interfered with his studies, and in 1873 he went to Paris to cultivate the musical talent he had displayed from an early age. Here he studied for two years with Émile Durand. In 1875, he returned to England, and in 1877 entered the Royal Academy of Music, where for three years he studied under Ebenezer Prout and Arthur Sullivan, twice winning the Lucas medal for composition. At a later period he received some instruction in orchestration from Max Bruch. His first published composition was a song, Le Roi Henri, which appeared in 1871.

An early comic opera, Don Braggadocio (libretto by his brother, C. I. Thomas), was apparently unfinished; some of the music in it was afterwards used for The Golden Web. A selection from his second opera, The Light of the Harem (libretto by Clifford Harrison), was performed at the Royal Academy of Music on 7 November 1879, with such success that Carl Rosa commissioned him to write Esmeralda (libretto by Theophile Marzials and Alberto Randegger), dedicated to Pauline Viardot, produced at Drury Lane on 26 March 1883. (Creator cast: Georgina Burns (Esmeralda): Barton McGuckin (Phoebus): William Ludwig (Frollo): Leslie Crotty (Quasimodo): Clara Perry (Fleur-de-Lys): Leah Don (Lois): J. H. Stilliard (Chevreuse): Ben Davies (Gringoire): G. H. Snazelle (Clopin).) This contained the very successful aria "O, vision entrancing". Two years later the opera was given (in German) at Cologne and Hamburg, and in 1890 (in French) at Covent Garden.

On 16 April 1885, at Drury Lane, Rosa produced Thomas's fourth and best opera, Nadeshda (libretto by Julian Sturgis); a German version of which (libretto by Friedrich Fremery) was given at Breslau in 1890. A fifth opera, The Golden Web (libretto by Frederick Corder and B. C. Stephenson), an opéra bouffe slighter than its predecessors, was produced (after the composer's death) by the Carl Rosa Opera Company at Liverpool on 15 February, and at the Lyric Theatre, London on 11 March 1893. In spite of some positive critical attention, interest in the opera was short-lived.

Besides these dramatic works, Thomas's chief compositions were a psalm, Out of the Deep, for soprano solo and chorus (London, 1878); a choral ode, The Sun Worshippers (Norwich, 1881), and a suite de ballet for orchestra (Cambridge, 1887). A cantata, The Swan and the Skylark, was found in piano score among his manuscripts after his death: it was orchestrated by Charles Villiers Stanford, and produced at the Birmingham Festival of 1894.

== Suicide ==
His minor compositions include over 100 songs and duets. In 1891 Thomas became engaged to be married; shortly afterwards he showed signs of mental disease, and his career came to a tragic end on 20 March 1892 when he took his own life by throwing himself in front of a train. At the time of his death, Thomas was living at 53, Wimpole Street, Westminster. He was buried in Finchley Cemetery.

== Critical reputation ==
Goring Thomas occupies a distinct place among English composers of the 19th century. His compositions are characterized by a melodic refinement and a noted capacity for dramatic structure, reflecting the influence of his early French pedagogical training. Musicologists often highlight the synthesis of technical precision and lyrical expression as a defining element of his aesthetic. Personally the most amiable of men, he was most critical of his own work, never attempting anything for which he felt he was unfitted, and constantly revising and rewriting his compositions.
