= St Stephen's Church, Westbourne Park =

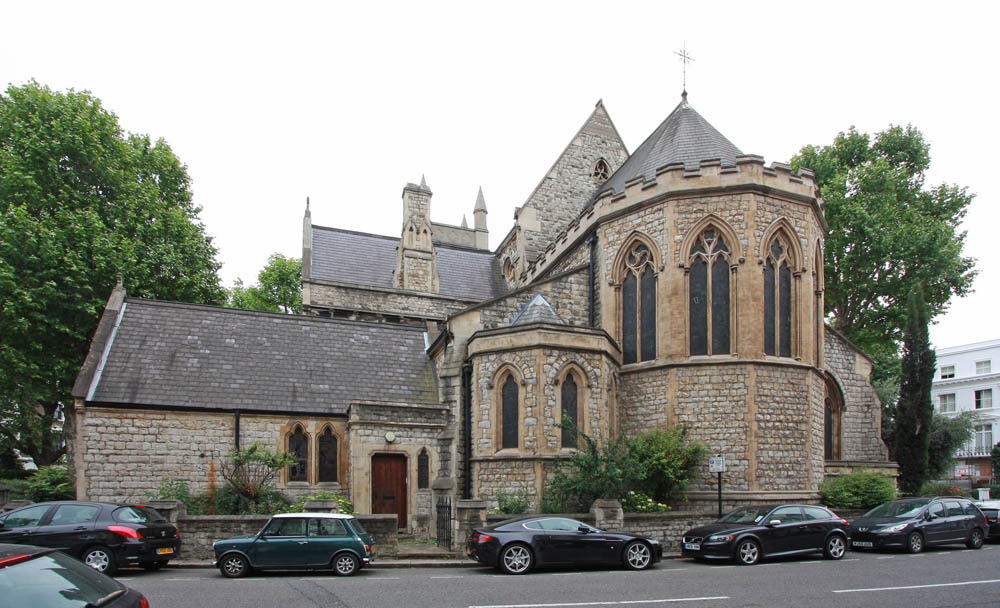
- St Stephen's Church, Westbourne Park
- St Stephen's Church, Westbourne Park
- 51°31′5″N 0°11′38″W
- Location: Westbourne, London
- Country: England
- Denomination: Church of England
- Website: ststephens.london

Administration
- Diocese: Diocese of London
- Archdeaconry: Charing Cross
- Deanery: Westminster Paddington

St Stephen's Church, Westbourne Park, is a Grade II listed parish church in the Church of England in London.

== History ==
St Stephen's Church dates from 1856. It was designed by the architect brothers Frederick John and Horace Francis, who designed at least 20 other churches around London – only St Stephen's is believed to still be in existence. Many changes have been made to the church over the years, the most notable being the removal of a tall spire. The latter was removed following World War II when it was deemed unsafe.

The church, both exterior and interior, appears in the 1954 Adelphi feature film The Crowded Day.

=== Vicars ===
- Richard Dryer (current)

== Organ ==
The organ dates from 1866 by William Hill. There have been subsequent modifications by Hill, Norman and Beard. A specification of the organ can be found on the National Pipe Organ Register. William Carter was organist-choirmaster at St Stephen's Church at the time that this organ was installed; serving in that position from 1860 through 1868.
