= William Carter (composer) =

English organist, pianist and composer (1838–1917)

William Carter (7 December 1838 – 1917) was an English composer, conductor, and organist. He began a lengthy career as an organist at mainly churches in London at the age of nine. In 1859 and 1860 he spent one year in Canada as the organist at Cathedral of the Holy Trinity, Quebec, during which time he staged what was possibly the largest Handel Festival in Canada at that time. As a composer he is known for his liturgical anthems for chorus and organ, sacred works for organ, the oratorio Placida, the Christian Martyr (1872), and Cantata Domino in E (1891). He founded and conducted the original choir at Royal Albert Hall, a group he led at that concert hall's grand opening in 1871.

== Life and career ==
Born in London, William Carter was a member of the English Carter family of musicians. His father John Carter (1802-????) worked as an organist at St Matthew's, Bethnal Green and married Anne Leach on 10 April 1831. Three of his brothers were also composers and organists: John Carter (1832–1916), George Carter (1835–1890) and Henry Carter (1837–1901). Like his brothers, William Carter was trained as an organist and pianist by his father and by the Austrian pianist and composer Ernst Pauer. He also studied with John Pyke Hullah (music theory, singing) and John Goss (composition). Beginning at the age of seven, he was a chorister at St Giles' Church, Camberwell, and he later sang in the choirs of the Chapel Royal and King's College London.

In 1848, at the age of nine, Carter was appointed organist at Christchurch, Rotherhithe, London. He left that post in 1850 to become organist at St Lawrence's Church, Whitchurch. He remained there until 1854 when he became organist at St Mary, Stoke Newington. He then became organist at St Helen's Church, Bishopsgate, in 1856.

In 1859 William left England for Canada to succeed his brother Henry Carter as organist at the Cathedral of the Holy Trinity, Quebec. While there he was the conductor of a prominent Handel festival staged for the centenary in April 1859 of the composer's death. It was possibly the largest Handel festival given in Canada at that point in the nation's history, and featured a performance of Judas Maccabeus among other works by the composer.

In 1860 Carter returned to England to become organist at St Stephen's Church, Westbourne Park. He remained there until 1868 when he was appointed organist of St Paul's, Onslow Square, where he remained for many years. His final posts as organist were at St Peter's Church, Belsize Park, and lastly Holy Trinity, Roehampton, where he retired in either 1903 or 1904.

Carter was founder of the original choir at Royal Albert Hall, and conducted the choir in the hall's inaugural concert in 1871. In 1872 his oratorio Placida, the Christian Martyr was given its world premiere at The Crystal Palace with tenor Arthur Byron as one of the featured soloists.

William Carter died in London in 1917.
