= Arthur Byron (tenor) =

English singer (1846–1890)

Arthur Edward George Byron (5 April 1846 – 16 January 1890) was an English tenor. From 1868 through 1872 he was active as a concert and opera singer in England, and from late 1872 through 1885 he appeared in opera houses in Italy. He also toured the United States with Max Strakosch and Clarence Hess's opera company in 1880–1881.

== Life and career ==
Byron was born on 5 April 1846, in Westminster, London, the son of Martin Charles Byron and Eliza Byron (née Sleap). He made his professional debut on March 3, 1868, at the Eyre Arms Assembly Room in London in a concert organized by the coronetist Philippe Paque. On April 30, 1868, he sang in a concert at the Beethoven Rooms in his native city performing under conductor Alberto Randegger who was Byron's principal music teacher. He sang under Randegger again as a tenor soloist in Felix Mendelssohn's Elijah at Royal Agricultural Hall the following October.

Randegger was a close protege of the German soprano Erminia Rudersdorff who was active as a voice teacher and singer in London at the time that Byron was studying with Randegger. As a result of this relationship, Byron often socialized with and performed with Rudersdorff and her students; including his first appearance at The Crystal Palace on November 26, 1868, in which he performed a love duet from Arthur Sullivan's The Sapphire Necklace with one of Rudersdorff's pupils, Edith Wynne. This was followed by an oratorio concert at Royal Albert Hall on 25 April 1869 in which he and Rudersdorff were soloists under conductor Joseph Barnby. Other London appearances in 1869 included performing as a soloist in concerts of Gioachino Rossini's Stabat Mater and John Francis Barnett's The Ancient Mariner, and performing as a tenor soloist at the Norwich Festival.

In 1870, Byron made his professional opera debut at the Gaiety Theatre, London as Lorenzo in Daniel Auber's Fra Diavolo with soprano Florence Lancia as Zerline. He then toured as the tenor soloist in performances of George Frideric Handel's Messiah in a concert series organized by and featuring Randegger as conductor and Rudersdorff and her pupils. In 1871, he appeared in Brighton as Don Ottavio in Wolfgang Amadeus Mozart's Don Giovanni and was again at the Gaiety Theatre in Lorenzo in addition to performing in several more concerts at The Crystal Palace and other venues in London. In 1872, he was the tenor soloist in the world premiere of the oratorio Placida, the Christian Martyr by composer and organist William Carter at The Crystal Palace. His final appearances in England were in October 1872 as a tenor soloist in a concert tour organized by the music publisher Thomas Boosey.

Byron left England for Italy where he was active on the opera stage from late 1872 through 1885. He performed the role of the Duke of Mantua in Giuseppe Verdi's Rigoletto at the Teatro Vittorio Emanuele II in December 1872. Soon after, he appeared at that theatre as Nemorino in L'elisir d'amore. In 1874, he performed Renzo in Amilcare Ponchielli's I promessi sposi at the Teatro Dal Verme in Milan; a role he repeated at opera houses in Novara and Fiume among other cities. In 1875, he was leading tenor at the Teatro Nuovo in Pisa and the Teatro Umberto in Florence. He also appeared other theatres in 1875 as a guest artist; including both Manrico in Il trovatore and Macduff in Macbeth at the Teatro Comunale Modena. In 1876, he had a major success in Verona as Arnoldo in Rossini's William Tell.

By 1879, Byron was "tenore di primo" of the Teatro di San Carlo in Naples where he specialized in the operas of Verdi. In 1880, he appeared at the Liceu in Barcelona as Vasco da Gama in Giacomo Meyerbeer's L'Africaine. He then toured the United States with Max Strakosch and Clarence Hess's opera company; making his American debut in Boston in November 1880 with performances as Manrico, Radamès in Aida, Don José in Carmen, and the title role Faust. He performed this same repertoire and also the part of Rossini's Arnoldo when the tour reached the New Orleans Opera House and later Broadway's Fifth Avenue Theatre and Philadelphia's Academy of Music among other stops.

While touring the United States, Byron formed a romantic attachment to one of his colleagues, the American soprano Laura Schirmer. The pair later married in Italy in 1882 after the tour ended in May 1881. Byron continued to perform in Italian opera houses in Pisa, Modena, Catania, and Parma through 1885. These years were not happy ones, as alcoholism took hold of the tenor and ultimately brought about the ruin of both his marriage and career. He returned to England and died not long after at St George's Union Infirmary on Fulham Road in London, on 16 January 1890, aged 43.
