= Not Terribly Good Club of Great Britain =

British club

The Not Terribly Good Club of Great Britain club was (according to Stephen Pile) started by Stephen Pile in order to bring together people of notable ineptitude so that they could share common experiences of failure. The club had a handbook, The Book of Heroic Failures, which became a best-seller.

== Description ==
The description of The Not Terribly Good Club of Great Britain at the front of the book under "The Author" stated that Stephen Pile set up the Club "Three years ago" and over the years had grown in members from 20 to 200. The club was a celebration of people who had a genuine flair for the exact opposite of success.

== Application form ==
The book had a form for readers to fill in and send to an address. The membership form (in the 10th edition of The Book of Heroic Failures) included a tick box with the words "I am interesting in demonstrating my main area of incompetence at the festival", which may have been deliberate.

== Demise ==
Shortly after forming, and after a couple of meetings and after Pile was deposed as president for showing alarming competence by preventing a disaster involving a soup tureen, the club was quickly forced to close.

According to the book's sequel (The Return of Heroic Failures), after receiving 20,000 applications when The Book of Heroic Failures was published, Pile closed the club in 1979, declaring "Even as failures, we failed". On other accounts, he lost his membership in the club because the book was such a success.
