= Víglundar saga =

Icelandic saga

Víglundar saga is one of the sagas of Icelanders. Víglundar saga utilizes the style and romance that also characterize the chivalric sagas. It is one of the latest of the Icelandic family sagas, dating to the end of the 14th or beginning of the 15th century. The saga is preserved in two leather manuscripts from the 15th century.

The saga tells the story of the love between Víglundr and Ketilríðr, who are attached to each other from childhood. The opera Thorgrim (1890) is based on this saga.

== Plot ==
In Norway, Þorgrímr Eiríksson and the beautiful Olof Þórisdóttir fall in love, but Olof's father arranges for her to be betrothed to a wealthy man named Ketill instead. Þorgrímr and Olof therefore elope and flee to Iceland, where they settle down and have two sons, Víglundr and Trausti, and a daughter, Helga.

As an adult, Víglundr Þorgrímsson begins courting Ketilríðr Hólmkelsdóttir, the daughter of his father's neighbour and friend Hólmkell. This upsets her mother Þorbjǫrg and brothers Einarr and Jǫkull, who begin plotting against Víglundr. Meanwhile, in Norway, Ketill has married and has three children – two sons (Sigurðr and Gunnlaugr) and a daughter (Ingibjǫrg). However, he is still obsessed with getting revenge against Þorgrímr, and offers to marry Ingibjǫrg off to an adventurer named Hákon if the latter will go to Iceland and kill Þorgrímr.

Hákon duly travels to Iceland and takes up lodging with Hólmkell, finding willing allies in the form of his host's sons Einarr & Jǫkull. The trio ambush Víglundr and Trausti in a field of haystacks. The attackers are all killed, but both Víglundr and Trausti are wounded, and to make matters worse the brothers are also outlawed for the killings.

Ketill sends his sons, Sigurðr and Gunnlaugr, to Iceland to kill Þorgrímr. Travelling incognito, the brothers are taken in by their unsuspecting target, but he is so kind to them that they decide not to go through with their mission. Instead, they help Víglundr and Trausti escape to Norway, and even persuade their father to drop his vendetta against Þorgrímr. The sentences of outlawry against Víglundr and Trausti are eventually lifted, and (unusually for an Íslendingasaga) the saga has a happy ending, concluding with a quadruple wedding of Víglundr Þorgrímsson to Ketilriðr Hólmkelsdóttir, Trausti Þorgrímsson to Ingibjǫrg Ketilsdóttir, Sigurðr Ketilsson to Helga Þorgrímsdóttir, and Gunnlaugr Ketilsson to Víglundr's cousin Ragnhildr Helgadóttir.

== Other sources ==
- Arna-Magnæan manuscript 551 A, 4to: Bárðar saga, Víglundar saga, Grettis saga (Københavns universitet. Universitetsbibliotek. Copenhagen, Munksgaard, 1954)
