= Filles-Dieu =

French religious community of nuns

The Filles-Dieu (French pronunciation: [fij djø], "daughters of God") were a French religious congregation founded before 1270, which was devoted to the service of the sick.

== Background ==
Briefly known as Sisters of Saint-Gervais, since they were employed in the hospital of the same name in 1300. Their branches were mainly in Paris, Orléans, Beauvais, and Abbeville. At the end of the 15th century the Paris house was on the Rue Saint-Denis, just a few metres from the Porte Saint-Denis, and was a home for two hundred ex-prostitutes. The Filles-Dieu wore white robes and black coats.
