= Alberto Randegger =

Italian-born composer, conductor and singing teacher (1832–1911)

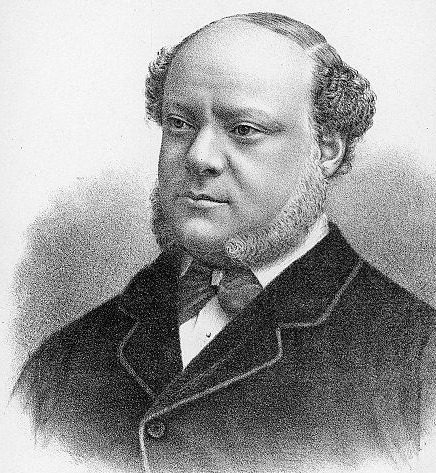
Randegger circa 1879

Alberto Randegger (13 April 1832 – 18 December 1911) was an Austro-Hungarian composer, conductor and singing teacher, best known for promoting opera and new works of British music in England during the Victorian era and for his widely used textbook on singing technique. His compositions included ballets, masses and other church music, operas and numerous other vocal pieces. He also edited several collections of vocal music.

He began his composing and conducting career in Trieste, where he met Giuseppe Verdi, but in 1854 he moved to London, which became his base for the rest of his life. From 1857 he conducted Italian opera at the St. James's Theatre and was professor of singing at the Royal College of Music and the Royal Academy of Music, retaining both posts for the rest of his life. From 1859 to 1870 he was organist at St Paul's Church, Regent's Park.

Randegger served as musical director of the Carl Rosa Opera Company from 1879 to 1885, gaining a reputation for high quality productions, and helping to revive interest in opera in England. He also became conductor of the Norwich Musical Festival, which he directed until 1905. From 1885 to 1887, he conducted Henry Leslie's Choir. In the 1890s, he conducted at Queen's Hall, the Theatre Royal, Drury Lane and the Royal Opera House, where he became known for his performances of Wagner, Verdi and Mozart operas. His most enduring legacy was a textbook titled Singing, published in 1879.

== Life and career ==
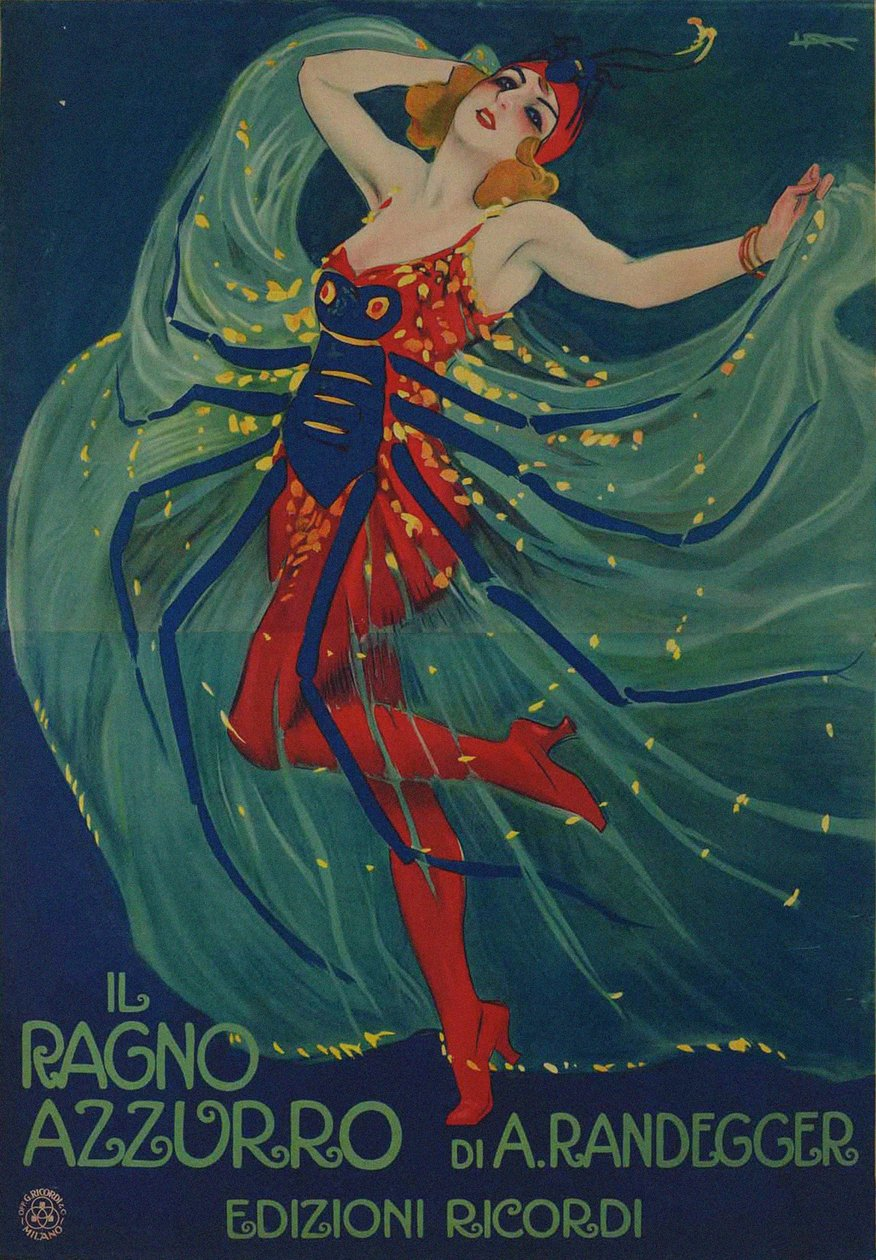
Poster for Randegger's Il ragno azzurro (1916) designed by Leopoldo Metlicovitz

=== Early years ===
Randegger was born in Trieste, Austro-Hungarian Empire, the son of a musician mother and schoolteacher father. He studied the piano with Jean Lafont and composition with Luigi Ricci.

Randegger's earliest compositions were masses and other pieces of church music and, with two other young pupils of Ricci, he produced two ballets and an opera, Il Lazzarone, in 1852. In 1854 he composed another opera, Bianca Capello, at Brescia. During this period, he also served as music director of theatres in Fiume, Senigallia, Brescia and Venice.

In 1854 Randegger was engaged to conduct a season of Italian opera in New York and was on his way there when news arrived of a cholera outbreak in the city. Instead, he spent a month in Paris, and on the recommendation of his elder brother he moved on to London, which became his base for the rest of his life. He built up a reputation as a singing teacher, conductor and composer, and from 1857 he conducted Italian opera at the St. James's Theatre. He was simultaneously professor of singing at the Royal College of Music and the Royal Academy of Music, retaining both posts for the rest of his life. From 1859 to 1870 he was organist at St Paul's Church, Regent's Park. His singing pupils included sopranos Evangeline Florence, Genevra Johnstone-Bishop, Alice Barth, Liza Lehmann, Greta Williams and Ellen Beach Yaw; mezzo-soprano Mary Davies; tenors Arthur Byron, William Hayman Cummings, William Lavin and Ben Davies; baritones David Bispham, Andrew Black, Charles W. Clark, David Ffrangcon-Davies and Frederick Ranalow; and basses Darrell Fancourt, Putnam Griswold and Robert Radford.

As a composer, in addition to his early works, Randegger wrote a comic opera, The Rival Beauties (1864); a musical play with the dramatist W. S. Gilbert, Creatures of Impulse (1871); a dramatic cantata, the 150th Psalm, for soprano solo, choir, orchestra and organ (1872); Fridolin (1873), with a libretto by Hermine Küchenmeister-Rudersdorf; two scenas for soprano and orchestra, Medea (1869) and Sappho (1875); a funeral anthem, An Angel Came Out of the Temple, in memory of the Prince Consort; The Prayer of Nature (1887); and numerous other vocal pieces. The Oxford Dictionary of National Biography observes that Randegger's compositions were distinguished by practical qualities, were always tasteful and externally effective, but had no deep originality, and soon fell into disuse. He edited several collections of vocal music and collaborated with T. J. H. Marzials on the libretto for Arthur Thomas's opera Esmeralda (1883).

=== Carl Rosa and later years ===
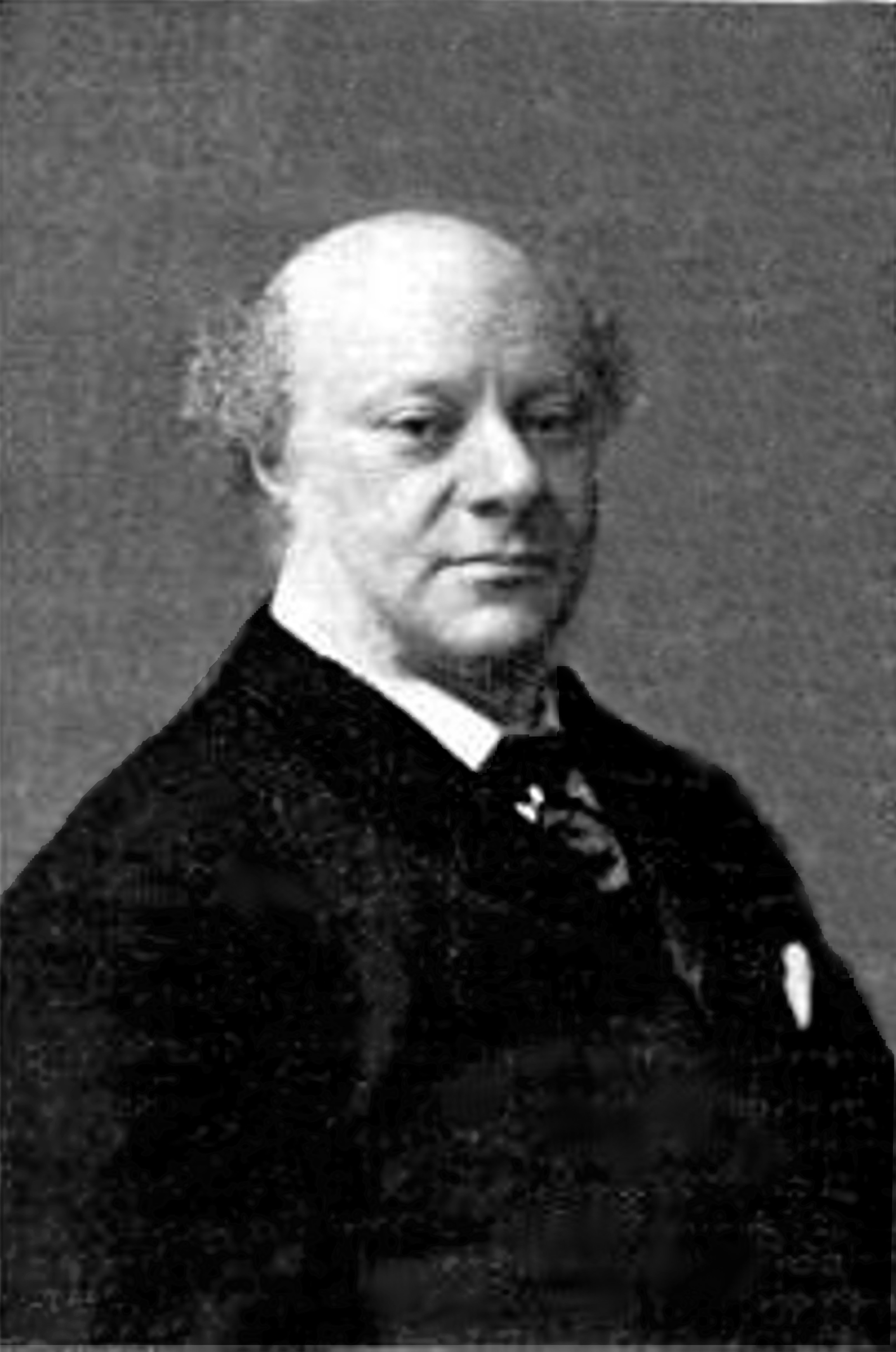
Randegger c. 1893

Randegger served as musical director of the Carl Rosa Opera Company from 1879 to 1885, helping to revive interest in opera in England. In 1880, George Grove wrote, "The careful way in which the pieces are put on the stage, the number of rehearsals, the eminence of the performers and the excellence of the performers have begun to bear their legitimate fruit, and the Carl Rosa Opera Company bids fair to become a permanent English institution." On the resignation of Julius Benedict in 1881, Randegger became conductor of the Norwich Musical Festival, which he directed until 1905. There he conducted new works by John Barnett, Frederic Cowen, Edward German, Alexander Mackenzie, Hubert Parry, Ebenezer Prout, Charles Villiers Stanford and others. At the 1905 Festival he invited 14 British composers to conduct performances of their own works. From 1885 to 1887, he also conducted Henry Leslie's Choir. He conducted the Queen's Hall Choral Society and the first two seasons of symphony concerts at Queen's Hall from 1895 to 1897. Finally, from 1887 to 1898, he conducted at the Theatre Royal, Drury Lane and the Royal Opera House, where he became known for his performances of Wagner, Verdi and Mozart operas. He had known Verdi since 1850, and learned much about his music at first hand. In his Mozart performances he removed the spurious orchestral parts added by his Covent Garden predecessors; a small collection of the composer's manuscripts was among his most treasured possessions.

Randegger's most lasting legacy was a textbook titled Singing, published in 1879 by Novello & Co, which was still in use in the 21st century. In 1882, Randegger was elected an honorary member of the Royal Philharmonic Society.

Randegger was married first to the actress Adeline de Leuw; they divorced in 1892, and on 11 March 1897 he married the American singer Louise Baldwin (her second marriage).

Randegger died at his home in Marylebone, London, at the age of 79, after a short illness. He was cremated at Golders Green crematorium.

== Sources ==
- Anya, Laurence (1978). Women of notes: 1 000 women composers born before 1900. Richards Rosen Press. OCLC 1137758426.
- Kurt Gänzl (2017). "Byron, Arthur (Edward George)". Victorian Vocalists. Taylor & Francis. ISBN 9781351593663.
- Grove, George (1899). A Dictionary of Music and Musicians, Volume III. London: Macmillan. OCLC 1042968263.
- Wyndham, H. Saxe; Geoffrey L'Epine (1913). Who's Who in Music. London: Sir Isaac Pitman and Sons. OCLC 6568647.
