= William Ludwig (baritone) =

Irish operatic baritone

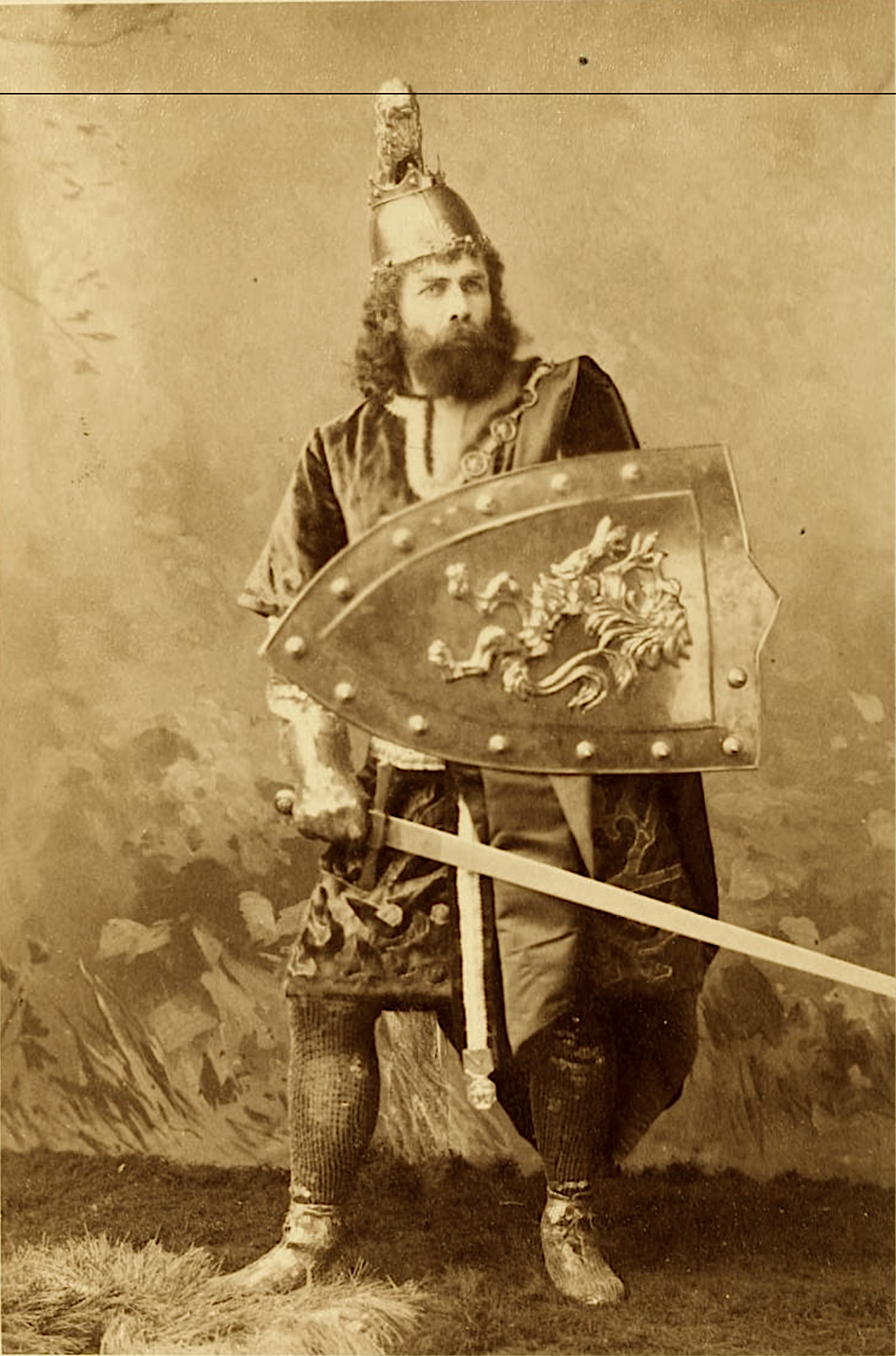
- Ludwig at the Boston Theatre in 1888.
- Born: William Ledwidge; 15 July 1847; Dublin, Ireland
- Died: 25 December 1923 (aged 76); London, UK
- Occupations: Opera and concert singer (baritone)
- Years active: 1874–1908
- Children: 15

William Ludwig (born William Ledwidge) (15 July 1847 – 25 December 1923) was an Irish operatic baritone who rose to fame in the second half of the nineteenth century. He was famous as an interpreter of Wagner, becoming the definitive Dutchman in Britain and the United States. He later became an equally famous concert artist. His most active period was from 1874 to 1908.

== Early life ==
Born in Dublin, Ireland, his father was a chorister, music teacher and music copyist. He was educated at the National Schools, Marlborough Street, where he received musical instruction from John W. Glover. He attended O'Connell School in North Richmond Street and often sang in the monastery chapel. He came under the influence of Brother Swan and later entered a solicitor's office. He sang for a time in the choir of St. Paul's Church, Arran Quay, with Mr. J. J. Fagan, his life-long friend. His first lessons were from Richard Vincent O'Brien (father of Vincent O'Brien). He sang in University Church where Alban Croft was the organist and where he met Signor Cellini who gave him lessons. After singing in various Dublin choirs he moved to London before 1870.

== London ==
He sang in the Gaiety Theatre, the Strand, under the management of John Hollingshead. It was during this period that he changed his name to Ludwig. This may have been because of frequent misspellings or because a more Germanic name suited the life of an opera singer.

== Carl Rosa ==
By 1874 he had joined the Carl Rosa Opera Company. Ludwig maintained a relationship with this company for the rest of his singing career. It was during his time with Carl Rosa that he came under the influence of Charles Santley. In 1877 he became chief baritone with Carl Rosa. He made his name in such famous Wagner roles as Wotan in the Ring cycle, Hans Sachs in Die Meistersinger and as the Dutchman in the Flying Dutchman. In Britain this part was often referred to as Vanderdacken, though Wagner never used that name. In 1883 he sang in Il Trovatore in the Gaiety Theatre, Dublin. A prototype telephone carried the performance to Earlsfort Terrace, Dublin, half a mile away, where an astonished audience was able to hear the singers and orchestra. He sang Claude Frollo in Goring Thomas's Esmeralda at Drury lane in 1883 and took part in the first performance of Mackenzie's Colomba (5 April 1883). He was also justly famous for his oratorio and concert singing. He was perhaps the greatest Vanderdecken of his day. Wagner is said to have given him a score of "The Flying Dutchman," inscribed: "To the incomparable Vanderdeken". However, Wagner referred to the title role as "the Dutchman" and not Vanderdecken, but in English productions the title role was always referred to as Vanderdecken or even Van Der Decken. Wagner was in London when Ludwig was singing with Carl Rosa, but definite evidence of their meeting has proved elusive.

== United States ==
Ludwig travelled to the United States for the first time in February 1886. He was engaged by the American Opera Company on the strength of his performances with Carl Rosa. He quickly established a name for himself as a Wagnerian interpreter. He played the Academy of Music in New York and went on to Baltimore and Cincinnati. In October 1887 he went to the United States for a second time. He set out from Dublin but missed the train to Cork. He hired a train and just missed his boat, the Servia, but managed to hire a tugboat and caught the Servia before it left the bay. This cost him £100 but it saved him having to default on his contract. Until 1909 he made regular trips to the United States and Canada. He once even declared his address in New York as "with the mayor". With the National Opera Company he performed in New York, Boston and Chicago.

== Britain ==
In Britain and Ireland his reputation increased. Sir Henry Wood described him as "the greatest Elijah". He formed his own concert parties and toured all over the British Isles. In 1898 he organised a series of "'98 Concerts" to commemorate the centenary of the 1798 rebellion. He had singers, pipers, harpists and dancers and "songs of love and war, keenes and lullabies". He did operatic arias as well as Irish songs. He made sure to include items from both traditions. He organised one such concert in Athlone. He engaged a young John McCormack for the trip. He put McCormack in the care of Lily Foley who went on to become Mrs John McCormack. John McCormack said "one of the most distinguished baritones Ireland has produced. It is a just tribute to one of the greatest singers Ireland ever produced to say, at this point, that William Ludwig was a supreme artist." James Joyce included him by name in Ulysses, in the Eumeaus section. He also referred to him obliquely in Finnegans Wake.

Ludwig often included two of his daughters in these concerts. He intended retiring and establishing a music school but he was struck down with a throat complaint. His last public performance was in the Theatre Royal, Dublin, with the Carl Rosa Company where he recreated the role of Danny Mann in Lily of Killarney. He did appear in the Abbey Theatre on 1 February 1911 in a special performance of act 2 of Wagner's 'Flying Dutchman'. His charity work is believed to have cost him much of his fortune. A benefit concert was arranged in London by Sir Herbert Tree in 1913. The money raised was used to buy him an annuity which allowed him to live out his days in modest circumstances. He also made some appearances in the silent movie industry. He died in London on Christmas Day 1923.

== The Ludwig Cup ==
The Ludwig Cup is awarded annually by the Royal Irish Academy of Music. It is presented to the winner of a competition for singers who present a 15-minute recital, excluding opera and oratorio arias. This takes place as part of the RIAM scholarship assessments around December or January. It is for 'interpretation' – principally lieder and in at least two different languages. It must come from the classical period covering Mozart to Richard Strauss.

== Personal life ==
Ludwig was married twice. Firstly to Mary Price in London in 1872. They had one son. She died in 1874. He then married Evelyn Miles in 1876. They had four sons and ten daughters. He maintained a home in London until his death.

== 1916 ==
The centenary of the 1916 Rising threw up the following fact:

Ludwig — of whom I heard a great deal in Limerick — was in Dublin last week. I took my sisters to hear him – we got a splendid treat. He deserves all that I had heard of his singing. But he had poor houses. The Ancient Concert Room wasn't more than half filled. If I were to pick out which of his songs and singing pleased me best I would say "God save Ireland". Good lord how he did thunder that out and what feeling he threw into it. Since I was a schoolboy I can only recollect tears flowing from me once — that was when I heard of my father's death in Portland. Ludwig dragged them out of me once again in singing "General Monroe" — the pathos he put into portions of that was marvellous. But ‘tis disgraceful to find such a singer and of such songs so badly patronised by Irishmen in Dublin. (Tom Clarke to Kathleen Daly, 27 August 1899
