= Zélie de Lussan =

American opera singer

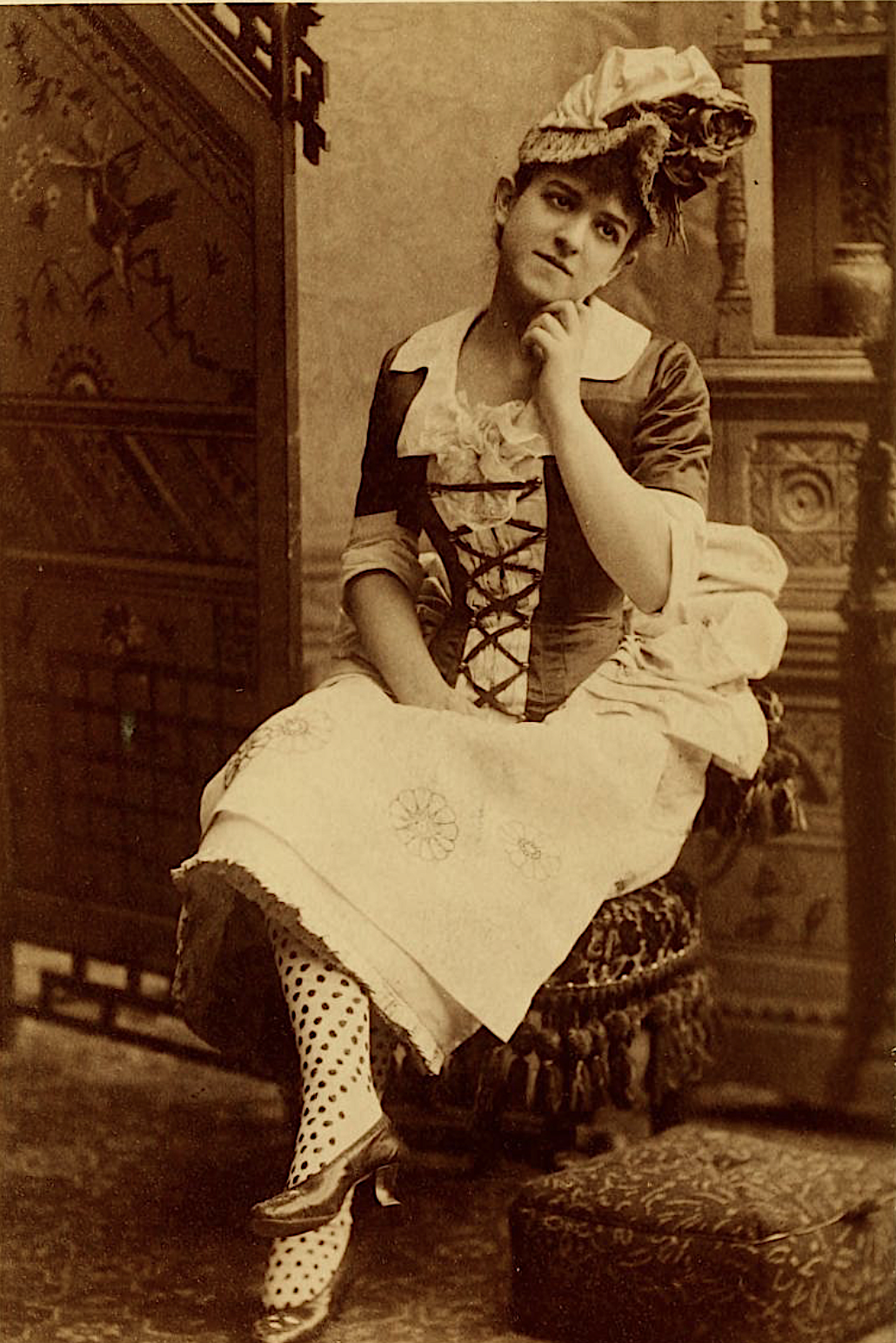
Zélie de Lussan

Zélie de Lussan (21 December 1861 – 18 December 1949) was an American opera singer of French descent who was successful in her native country but made most of her career in England. The wide range of her voice allowed her to sing both mezzo-soprano and soprano roles. Among de Lussan's most famous roles was the title role in Bizet's Carmen, which she performed 2,000 times. She appeared with Sir Thomas Beecham's opera companies, at Covent Garden and with the Carl Rosa Opera Company. After retiring from the stage she made her home in London, where she continued to teach singing for many years.

== Life and career ==
=== Early years ===
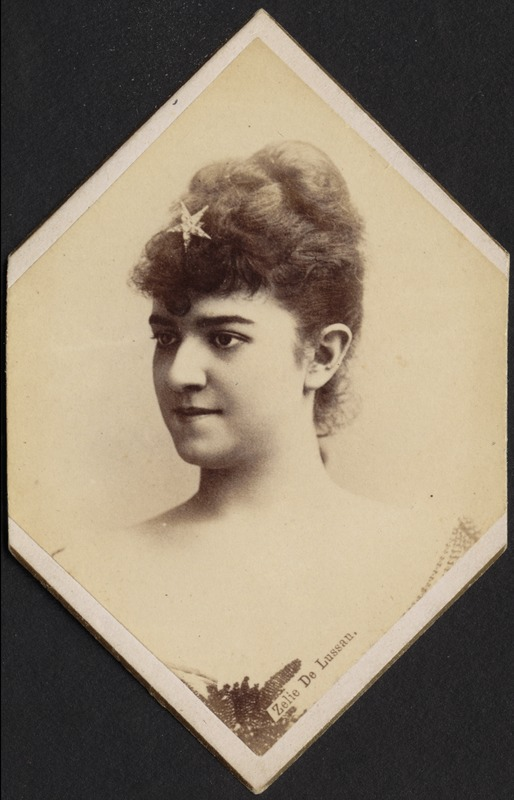
Zelie De Lussan, ca. 1859–1870; from the Carte de Visite Collection of the Boston Public Library.

Zélie de Lussan was born in Brooklyn, New York, to French parents, Paul Louis de Lussan and his wife Amédée Eugénie Bizel, a professional soprano. The young Zélie first appeared on stage at the age of nine but her parents forbade her to embark on a professional musical career. The Swedish singer Christina Nilsson heard her sing and persuaded the de Lussans to change their minds. After training with her mother, de Lussan made her operatic début in 1884 in Boston, Massachusetts, as Arline in Balfe's The Bohemian Girl, in which she was an immediate success. Augustus Harris engaged her to appear in the first season under his management at Covent Garden, London, and as Carmen she made the part "peculiarly her own." Some critics compared her favourably to Emma Calvé, then the leading interpreter of the role. The Times wrote of her début, "This young lady, like most modern prime donne, comes from America; but she is an American with a difference, being ... partly French and partly Spanish ... her movements are lithe and graceful, almost snake-like; and, in brief, we have here an interesting and attractive Carmen, who makes her audiences not only applaud but think." Later, George Bernard Shaw was less enthusiastic: "the performance was slipshod and perfunctory. Melba, De Reszke, Lasalle and Miranda sang in French; Ciampi and the chorus sang in Italian; and Miss de Lussan sang in whatever language seemed to have the best of it for the moment." Shaw nevertheless acknowledged de Lussan's prominence: "Last Wednesday I was told that Siegfried was to be produced that evening at Covent Garden. I was incredulous, and asked my informant whether he did not mean Carmen, with Miss Zélie de Lussan in the title part."

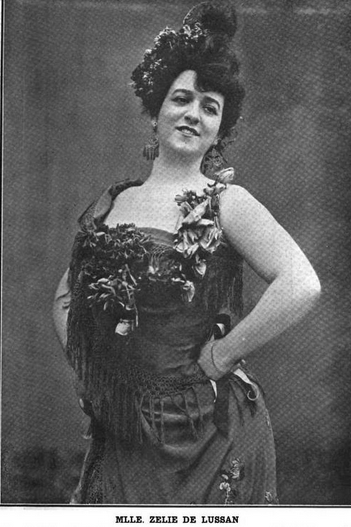
Zélie de Lussan, from a 1907 publication.

In London her successes included Zerlina in Don Giovanni, and, in 1897, Musetta in London's first performances of La bohème. Her singing greatly impressed Queen Victoria, and she was more than once invited to sing at Balmoral and Windsor castles. In 1894 she made her début at the Metropolitan Opera as Carmen, and appeared there for three seasons in roles including Nannetta (Falstaff), Zerlina, and Nedda (Pagliacci). In 1910 she sang Cherubino in The Marriage of Figaro in Thomas Beecham's Mozart season at His Majesty's Theatre. The Times observed, "The wide range of her voice, which combined the rich timbre of a mezzo-soprano and a bright ringing tone in the head register, permitted her to do justice to many parts." She appeared regularly at Covent Garden between 1890 and 1910, and also appeared in France, Spain and Portugal. She also worked with smaller companies such as the Carl Rosa and Moody-Manners Opera Company, with whom she sang until 1913. The Manchester Guardian reported, "At one period she sang for three years without a single week's rest, the Carl Rosa, Covent Garden and Drury Lane seasons filling up the whole year."

=== Recordings ===
On 17 May 1903 de Lussan recorded five songs for the Victor Talking Machine Company in the second recording session for domestically-published records for Victor's exclusive "Red Seal". Her recording of the Habanera from Carmen from this session is the earliest operatic aria recorded on a Red Seal disc. In 1906 she made another four records on the Beka label.

=== Later years ===
After her marriage in 1907 to the pianist Angelo Fronani she gradually retired, though she played Carmen as late as 1915. In 1914 The Manchester Guardian commented, "Though it would be flattery to say that she is as good as ever, her Carmen is still the best (with the exception of her own) that we have ever heard." In 1915 she again played Cherubino, in which role Samuel Langford described her as "inimitable ... she dominates the stage". In the same year she gave her 2,000th performance as Carmen.

After her husband died in 1918 she continued to make her home in London. According to Grove's Dictionary of Music and Musicians, "She taught for many years in England, retaining the vitality and charm of her personality well into old age. Her recordings are few but show something of her rich voice and lively temperament." She died in London three days short of her 88th birthday.

== Additional Information ==
- Zelie De Lussan Papers, 1863-1949, Sophia Smith Collection, Smith College.
