= Bradford Permanent Orchestra =

The Bradford Permanent Orchestra was a symphony orchestra founded at Bradford, West Yorkshire, England in 1892.

== History ==
When the orchestra was founded it followed decades of development, the efforts of local societies, ensembles, amateur and professional musicians; most recently led by W. B. Sewell to create a permanent orchestral ensemble in Bradford. Sewell first organized an orchestra at Bradford in 1882, and when he instituted the Bradford Popular Concerts for the 1886-1887 season, the press described it as "a movement of greater promise for musical culture and entertainment than any that has been attempted since the establishment of the Bradford Festival Choral Society." Sewell programmed nine concerts and nineteen rehearsals at St George's Hall, with repertoire including first Bradford performances of Haydn's Largo for strings; Barnett’s Elfland (Op.36); Cowen’s Language of the Flowers, and Scandinavian symphony; Prout’s March from Hereward (Op.12), and Birmingham symphony; Sérénade hongroise by Joncières; ballet music from Coppélia and Sylvia by Léo Delibes; overtures from La Gioconda by Ponchielli, La reine de Saba by Gounod, and Rosamunde by Reinecke; Sullivan’s Overture di Ballo and Henry VIII incidental music; and the overture from Mackenzie's Colomba. Guest artists included Leonard Emil Bach, Clara Samuell, John Dunn, Herbert Sharpe, Jules-Bernard Lasserre, Nettie Carpenter, Robert Watkin-Mills. Sewell's concerts sought to "establish a permanent Bradford orchestra and systematically keep the finest orchestral music before the public."

Not long into the first season the press observed,

The third of Mr W. B. Sewell's Saturday concerts in St. George's Hall, Bradford, clearly proved two things,— that the concerts are misnamed, as they show no evidence of popularity, and that by rapid consolidation and the excellence of its performances this orchestra has exceeded the most sanguine expectations. The empty galleries on Saturday night must have been very disheartening to the promoter, and it is evident that if there is a desire to please the people more familiar music must be provided without trenching too much upon the claims of the subscribers, who muster in fair strength in the area and stalls. That the people of Bradford had every sympathy with the movement was abundantly seen in the remarkable demonstration at the opening concert. They attended in numbers, they cheered and cheered again for conductor and band, and afterwards their enthusiasm evaporated because it could not live on purely “classical” music, although admittedly played in first-class style. The first concert proved that there is an audience to be obtained, and the third one as clearly showed that the people will only attend to hear what they can understand and thoroughly appreciate.

The issues faced in the first season persisted; eventually leading to the concerts being discontinued midway through their third season in January 1889. Later that year Sewell was declared bankrupt. While it is unclear how significant a role the concerts played in Sewell's bankruptcy, it was commonly accepted, in the years following that they were a considerable pecuniary loss.

=== Founding years ===
The desire for a permanent symphony orchestra resurfaced in 1892 and prompted a new scheme — a co-operative. After a series of meetings the proposal entailed, "the offer of the players to give their services, under proper organisation, for regular winter concerts, until any approved scheme that may be floated shall produce a profit, upon which they will have the first claim. Until then they pledged themselves to play for whatever proportion of their fees may accrue out of each concert." At a meeting in late July of interested parties an Executive Committee was elected. Within three months sales of over 100 Guineas worth of tickets were reported, and the venue, St George's Hall had been secured for the season. The series of concerts had guest artistes including Annie Albu; musical humorist Nellie Ganthony, Edward Branscombe; Huddersfield Glee and Madrigal Society; Thomas Rutling; and Samuel Midgley.

At the annual meeting, following the orchestra's first season, the balance sheet showed revenue of £366 19s 9d, leaving a deficit of £51 17s, and as the professional musicians had given their services gratuitously for the past season, a further deficit of £120 had been avoided. After the orchestra voted to continue the venture, it was proposed, and adopted, that guarantors be sought who would take tickets in lieu money. The orchestra gained broader attention when the Yorkshire correspondent for The Musical Times reported,

While dealing with Bradford, a town specially favoured in musical matters, mention must be made of the excellent work done by the Bradford Permanent Orchestra, a body partly professional, but chiefly amateur, which has given a series of excellent People’s Concerts during the season, under the conductorship of Mr. W. B. Sewell.

The attention and encouragement from the periodical continued upon the outset of the orchestra's second season. Writing that the concerts "deserve the hearty support of music-lovers" arguing, "Not only do they supply the people with good music very cheaply, but in laying the foundations of a local permanent orchestra they are doing a work the importance of which can hardly be overrated."

The next series of concerts had guest artistes including Welsh soprano Maggie Davies; Westminster Abby tenor Edward Branscombe; Royal Manchester College of Music pianist Frederick Dawson, and soprano Annie Holden; Thomas Rutling; Annie Albu, and violinist Isabella Donkersley. The season concluded with a concert where the first performance of Charles John Vincent'sThe Storm, conducted by the composer was given. The work was originally titled Wreck of the Hesperus and was composed "for the Bradford Permanent Orchestra, and dedicated to the conductor, Mr. W. B. Sewell”. At the annual meeting that followed, the balance sheet had a surplus of £15 3s 10d. The orchestra had paid off the previous season's deficit and paid themselves half salaries.

The third season opened with a concert where the composer Ebenezer Prout conducted his Suite de Ballet. Following the performance Prout is reported to have been "pleasantly surprised to find the orchestra much exceeding his anticipation." And, "He did not know a resident orchestra in the provinces to equal it". In December 1894, the orchestra gave the first performance of a new work written for the ensemble by Nicholas Kilburn. A further two new works written for the orchestra were given first performances; William Creser's Folk-Lore symphony, a work where nearly a dozen folk tunes are substantially embodied into its four movements; and the Fugue on the Sailor’s Hornpipe by John Charles Ward. At the final concert of the season Hubert Parry conducted a selection of his compositions. Guest artists and soloists during the third season included Mendelssohn Fawcett, and John Dunn. In their third season the orchestra achieved a surplus having paid professional members full salaries.

=== Conductors ===
The founding conductor of the orchestra was William Bell Sewell. Appointed by election in 1892, re-elected in 1893, and 1894. Soon after the completion of the orchestra's third season Sewell resigned the conductorship due to illness.

Following the position being advertised Albert Emmanuel Bartle was appointed conductor of the orchestra in August 1895.

Frederic Hymen Cowen was appointed conductor in 1899. Cowen did not care for the orchestra, the work required of him, nor how it interrupted his weekends. Writing in his 1913 autobiography

The year following my appointment at Manchester and Liverpool, I was elected conductor of the Bradford Festival Choral Society, and a little while after that I also undertook the direction of the Bradford Permanent Orchestra. The latter position I only kept for a year or two. It was really an amateur society, and though quite creditable in its way, it entailed more extra work than I cared for; added to which, the concerts being on Saturday evenings, I was prevented from spending the week-end at home, as I always liked to do. They were a good set of fellows, though, and had an admiration for me that was as unusual as it was pleasant. When, in 1900, I received my Mus. Doc. degree at Cambridge, they made it the excuse for presenting me with a very handsome testimonial, which gave me the opportunity of remarking to them, that “if absence makes the heart grow fonder, presents make it fonder still. [original emphasis]

Following Cowen's departure in 1902, the executive committee chose not to reappoint Bartle, instead they elected to make Allen Gill conductor.

From time to time Landon Roland conducted the orchestra; guest conducting concerts in the orchestra's seventeenth, eighteenth and nineteenth seasons. For the 1911-1912 season the Executive Committee divided the concerts between five conductors - Roland, Gill, Julian Clifford, Herbert Austin Fricker, and Arthur W. Payne. In the following 1912-1913 season duties were divided between Gill, Clifford, and Fricker. 1913-1914 saw four conductors Clifford, Fricker, Frederick Dawson, and Walter Haigh. In the two seasons spanning 1914-1916 Herbert Hamilton Harty and Clifford shared duties. The 1916-1917 season was divided between Granville Bantock, Eugéne Goossens, and Harty.

The revolving door of conductors stopped in 1917 when Julian Clifford was appointed the conductorship.

Julius Harrison conducted the ensemble from 1920 until 1927.

Occasionally visiting composers conducted their own works, these included Arthur Sullivan, Hubert Parry, Charles Villiers Stanford, Edward Elgar and Edward German.

=== Contemporary music ===
Bradford Permanent Orchestra had a history of promoting and performing lesser known works by contemporary composers. In November of 1919 The Musical Times wrote:

Bradford Permanent Orchestra, which also appeals to a ‘popular’ Saturday night audience, but has none the less ventured to insinuate among pieces whose popularity is assured, a considerable number of less familiar works, including a fairly representative series by contemporary native composers, such as Arnold Trowell, Percy Pitt, Coleridge-Taylor, Sullivan, Stanford, Elgar, Vaughan Williams, Holbrooke, Reynolds, Hamilton Harty, and Grainger.

In 1908 under Allen Gill the orchestra gave the first performances of works by Joseph Weston Nicholl, John Carlowitz Ames, Lilian Robinson, William Wolstenholme, Henry Geehl, Harry Assur Keyser, and James Lyon. On the 22 March 1919, under Julian Clifford, the orchestra gave the first concert performance of the Japanese Suite by Gustav Holst. Fugue on the Sailor’s Hornpipe by John Charles Ward was written specifically for the Bradford Permanent Orchestra. And, the symphonic poem Oxford by Keith Douglas was given its first performance by the orchestra on 19 December 1925.
