= The Lady of Lyons =

Melodrama by Edward Bulwer-Lytton, 1st Baron Lytton

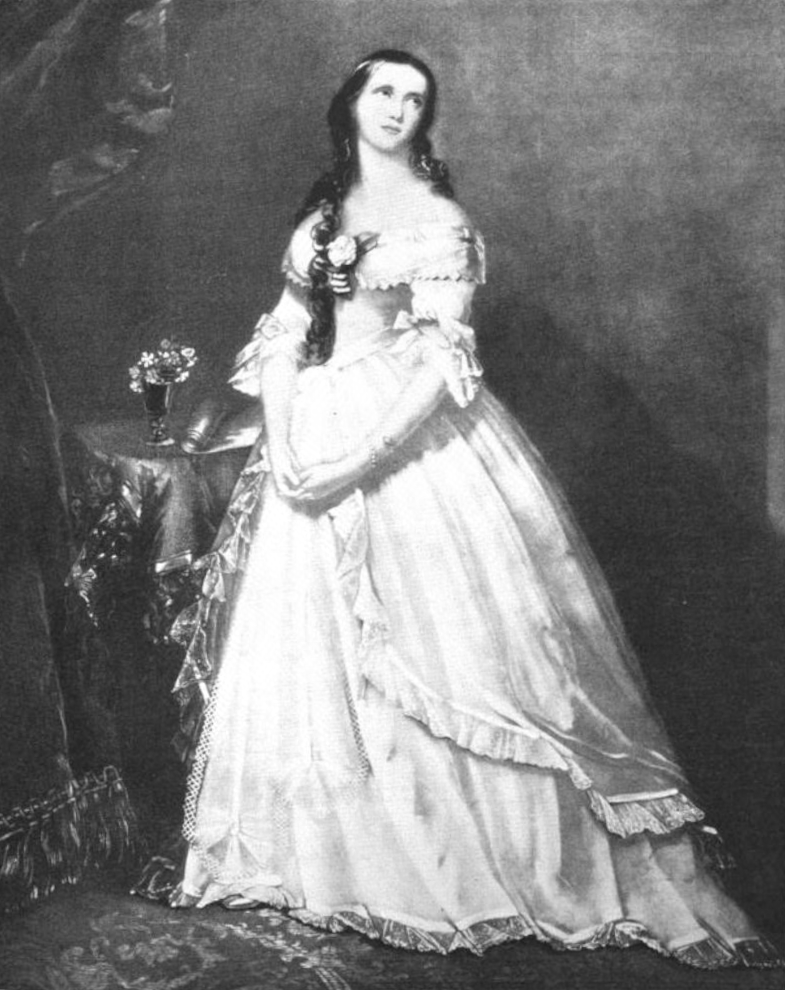
Helena Faucit as Pauline

The Lady of Lyons; or, Love and Pride, commonly known as The Lady of Lyons, is a five-act romantic melodrama written in 1838 by Edward Bulwer-Lytton, 1st Baron Lytton. It was first produced in London at Covent Garden Theatre on 15 February 1838 and was revived many times over the rest of the 19th century. It was also adapted into two operas, and formed part of the plot of an operetta.

== Plot ==
Pauline Deschapelles has jilted the Marquis Beauséant. Claude Melnotte, the son of Pauline's gardener, is in love with her. Beauséant persuades Melnotte to disguise himself as a foreign prince to trick Pauline into marrying him. When Melnotte takes Pauline to his widowed mother's home after the marriage, she discovers the ruse and gets the marriage annulled. Melnotte enlists in the army to assuage his remorse. Pauline's father is then threatened with bankruptcy, and Beauséant is willing to pay the debt if Pauline will marry him. Melnotte becomes a war hero, and Pauline realises that she is truly in love with Melnotte after all.

== Production history ==
The play premiered at Covent Garden Theatre in London on 15 February 1838. Helena Faucit played Pauline, with William Macready as Melnotte. Its first production in America was in 1838 at New York's Park Theatre, with a cast including Mrs. Richardson as Pauline, Edwin Forrest as Melnotte, Charlotte Cushman as the Widow Melnotte, and Peter Richings as Beauséant. The piece received critical praise and was revived many times. An article in 1899 in Hawaiian Star commented: "The play is Bulwer-Lytton's masterpiece for the stage, and has held its place as a standard drama for near on to half a century, being as popular now as when it was first produced."

== Musical adaptations ==
It formed the basis for the operas Leonora (1845) with music by William Henry Fry, the first grand opera written in America; Pauline (1876) with music by Frederic H. Cowen; and for part of the plot of the operetta Der Bettelstudent (1882) with music by Carl Millöcker.
