= The Planets discography =

This is a discography of commercial recordings of The Planets, Op. 32, an orchestral suite by Gustav Holst, composed between 1914 and 1916, and first performed by the Queen's Hall Orchestra conducted by Adrian Boult on 29 September 1918. It includes the composer's own recordings made in 1922–1923 and 1926. The chorus is identified where information is available.

== Orchestral version ==
Year	Conductor	Orchestra and Chorus	Label	Recording notes
1922	Gustav Holst	London Symphony Orchestra	Columbia	recorded 27 October 1922 (Jupiter only) at Petty France Studios; acoustic recording, reissued in 2008 on Pristine Classical and in 2014 on Explore Multimedia
1923	Gustav Holst	London Symphony Orchestra	Columbia	recorded 23 August (Mercury, Venus), 24 August (Uranus), 30 October (Mars, Saturn) & 6 November (Neptune) 1923 at Petty France Studios; acoustic recording, reissued in 2008 on Pristine Classical and in 2014 on Explore Multimedia
1925	Gustav Holst	London Symphony Orchestra	Columbia	recorded 19 February (Saturn) & 15 September (Jupiter) 1925 at Petty France Studios; acoustic recording, reissued in 2014 on Explore Multimedia
1926	Gustav Holst	London Symphony Orchestra, Women of the London Symphony Chorus	Columbia	recorded complete on 22 June, 2 July, 14 September and 22 October 1926 at Petty France Studios, London; electrical recording; released in December 1926; re-issued on LP in 1972, on CD from 1991 onwards and frequently reissued
1926	Albert Coates	Symphony Orchestra	His Master's Voice	only Mars, Mercury, Jupiter and Uranus, recorded September 1926 in Kingsway Hall, the London Symphony Orchestra giving an uncredited performance; reissued on CD in 1992 on Koch Historic
1942	Ernest MacMillan	Toronto Symphony Orchestra	RCA Victor	only Mars, Venus, Mercury and Jupiter, recorded 27 March 1942 at Massey Hall, Toronto; released on CD in 2006
1943	Leopold Stokowski	NBC Symphony Orchestra	Cala Records	NBC radio broadcast of 14 February 1943 in Studio 8H, New York City, the earliest American performance on disc; reissued on Pristine Classical
1945	Sir Adrian Boult	BBC Symphony Orchestra	His Master's Voice	recorded 2-5 January 1945 at the Corn Exchange, Bedford, Producer: Walter Legge, balance engineer: Arthur Clarke; the first of Boult's five recordings of the work
1946	Adrian Boult	Boston Symphony Orchestra, Women of the Boston Symphony Orchestra	SOMM Ariadne	recorded live 2 February 1946 in Symphony Hall, Boston
1953	Sir Adrian Boult	Philharmonic Promenade Orchestra; Members of the London Philharmonic Choir	Nixa	recorded in September 1953 at Walthamstow Assembly Hall. The orchestra was the London Philharmonic, under a pseudonym for contractual reasons
1954	Sir Malcolm Sargent	London Symphony Orchestra, Women's Chorus	Decca	recorded 17 & 20-21 March 1954 in Kingsway Hall, London; Producer James Walker, engineer Kenneth Wilkinson; reissued in 2005 by Pristine Classical and in 2025 by Eloquence Australia
1956	Leopold Stokowski	Los Angeles Philharmonic Orchestra, Women's Voices of the Roger Wagner Chorale	Capitol	the work's first stereo recording, made 2-3 September 1956 on Stage Seven of the Samuel Goldwyn Studios, Hollywood; issued on LP; reissued on CD by EMI and on High Definition Tape Transfer
1957	Sir Malcolm Sargent	BBC Symphony Orchestra, BBC Women's Chorus	His Master's Voice	recorded 12 August and 2 & 3 September 1957 in Kingsway Hall
1957	Sir John Barbirolli	RAI Turin Symphony Orchestra and Chorus	The Barbirolli Society	without 'Saturn' and 'Neptune', 'Jupiter' placed at the end of the performance; recorded live on 15 November 1957 at the Auditorium RAI Turin
1959	Sir John Barbirolli	New York Philharmonic-Symphony Orchestra	West Hill Radio Archives	without 'Saturn' and 'Neptune', 'Jupiter' placed at the end of the performance; recorded live on 18 January 1959 in Carnegie Hall; released in 2010
1959	Sir Adrian Boult	Vienna State Opera Orchestra, Women of the Wiener Akademie Kammerchor	Westminster	recorded 15-27 March 1959 in the Konzerthaus, Vienna; reissued on CD by MCA Records and Westminster, also remastered for High Definition Tape Transfers
1961	Herbert von Karajan	Vienna Philharmonic Orchestra, Women of the Vienna State Opera Chorus	Decca	recorded 5-22 September 1961 at the Sofiensaal, Vienna; reissued on CD in 2007
1965	Sir Malcolm Sargent	BBC Symphony Orchestra	IMP BBC Radio Classics	recorded live 3 February 1965 at the Royal Festival Hall, London; issued on CD in 1995
1966	Sir Adrian Boult	New Philharmonia Orchestra, Women of The Ambrosian Singers	His Master's Voice	recorded 21-22 July 1966 in Kingsway Hall, London; Producer: Peter Andry, balance engineer: Christopher Parker
1970	Bernard Herrmann	London Philharmonic Orchestra, Louis Halsey Singers	Decca	Phase 4 Stereo; recorded 23-25 February 1970 in Kingsway Hall, London
1970	Bernard Haitink	London Philharmonic Orchestra, Women of the John Alldis Choir	Philips	recorded March 1970
1970	William Steinberg	Boston Symphony Orchestra, Women of the New England Conservatory Chorus	Deutsche Grammophon	recorded September/October 1970 in Symphony Hall, Boston; released in 1971
1971	Zubin Mehta	Los Angeles Philharmonic Orchestra, Female Voices of the Los Angeles Master Chorale	Decca	recorded 19 April 1971 at the Royce Hall, University of California, Los Angeles; an extra tubist, Tommy Johnson (tubist), was hired during the recording sessions.
1971	Leonard Bernstein	New York Philharmonic Orchestra, Women of the Camerata Singers	Columbia	recorded in early December 1971 in Avery Fisher Hall; released in 1973; reissued on CD in 1985 and 1997, and remastered on SACD in 2022 by Dutton; music was subject of Bernstein's final Young People's Concerts broadcast in March 1972
1973	Sir Adrian Boult	BBC Symphony Orchestra, Ladies of the BBC Singers and the London Choral Society	BBC Music Magazine / ica	recorded live 7 September 1973 at the Royal Albert Hall; originally issued with the BBC Music Magazine, Vol. 21, No. 10, July 2013
1973	André Previn	London Symphony Orchestra, Women of the Ambrosian Singers	EMI	recorded 28-29 September 1973 in Kingsway Hall, London; engineer: Christopher Parker; reissued not only on CD, but also on DVD Audio
1974	George Hurst	Bournemouth Symphony Orchestra, Bournemouth Municipal Choir	Contour	recorded at Southampton Guildhall; producer Brian Culverhouse, engineer Brian Couzens; reissued in 2010
1974	Walter Susskind	Saint Louis Symphony Orchestra, Ronald Arnatt Chorale and Missouri Singers	Turnabout and VOX	recorded September 1974 in Powell Hall, Saint Louis; reissued in 2004 by MFSL as a hybrid multichannel SACD
1975	James Loughran	Hallé Orchestra, Hallé Ladies Chorus	EMI Classics for Pleasure	recorded in July 1975 at the Free Trade Hall, Manchester; in December 2009 came 8th in BBC's Top 30 Most Played classical recordings over three-quarters of a century
1975	Eugene Ormandy	The Philadelphia Orchestra, Women's Voices of the Mendelssohn Club of Philadelphia	RCA Red Seal	recorded in December 1975 at the Scottish Rite Cathedral, Philadelphia; the recording was used for Ken Russell's film The Planets of 1983; reissued in 1993
1977	Neville Marriner	Concertgebouw Orchestra, Ladies of the Ambrosian Singers	Philips	recorded 22-24 June 1977 in Amsterdam, released in 1978
1978	Sir Georg Solti	London Philharmonic Orchestra, Ladies of the London Philharmonic Choir	Decca	recorded in February 1978 in Kingsway Hall
1978	Sir Adrian Boult	London Philharmonic Orchestra, Ladies of the Geoffrey Mitchell Choir	EMI	Boult's fifth and final studio recording, recorded 12 and 30 May, 4 June and 31 July 1978, in Kingsway Hall and at Abbey Road, 60 years after he led the work's premiere; released for Boult's 90th birthday
1979	Sir Alexander Gibson	Scottish National Orchestra, Women's Voices of the RSNO Chorus	Chandos	recorded 2–3 July 1979 at Henry Wood Hall, Glasgow
1979	Kazuyoshi Akiyama	Vancouver Symphony Orchestra	Canadian Broadcasting Corporation	released in 1980
1979	Seiji Ozawa	Boston Symphony Orchestra, Women of the New England Conservatory Chorus	Philips	recorded in December 1979 in Symphony Hall, Boston
1980	Kazuyoshi Akiyama	Tokyo Symphony Orchestra	FINE	released in 2001
1980	Gennady Rozhdestvensky	BBC Symphony Orchestra, Ladies of the BBC Symphony Chorus	ica classics	performed live 12 March 1980 at the Royal Festival Hall, London; first released in 2012
1980	Simon Rattle	Philharmonia Orchestra, Ladies of the Ambrosian Singers	EMI	recorded 29–30 December 1980 in Kingsway Hall, London; digital recording
1981	Lorin Maazel	Orchestre National de France, Maîtrise de Radio France	CBS Masterworks	Children's choir used in Neptune; recorded 4-5 July 1981 in Studio 104, Radio France, Paris
1981	Herbert von Karajan	Berlin Philharmonic Orchestra, Women of the RIAS Kammerchor	Deutsche Grammophon	recorded in January 1981 in the Berliner Philharmonie
1986	Andrew Davis	Toronto Symphony Orchestra, Toronto Children's Chorus	His Master's Voice	recorded 20 January 1986 in the Centre in The Square, Kitchener, Ontario
1986	André Previn	Royal Philharmonic Orchestra, Women of the Brighton Festival Chorus	Telarc	recorded 14–15 April 1986 at Watford Town Hall
1986	John Williams	Boston Pops Orchestra, Women of the Tanglewood Festival Chorus	Philips	recorded in June 1986 in Symphony Hall, Boston
1986	Charles Dutoit	Montreal Symphony Orchestra, Women of the Orchestre Symphonique de Montréal Chorus	Decca	recorded in June 1986 at St Eustache, Montreal
1986	Geoffrey Simon	London Symphony Orchestra, Women of the London Symphony Chorus	Delta Entertainment	recorded at All Saints Church, Tooting; reissued in 1998
1987	Eduardo Mata	Dallas Symphony Orchestra, Women of the Dallas Symphony Chorus	Pro Arte	recorded at Cliff Temple Baptist Church, Dallas; issued in surround sound on SION
1987	Richard Hickox	London Symphony Orchestra, Ladies of London Voices	IMP Classics	recorded 8–9 July 1987 in Abbey Road Studio 1
1987	Sir Charles Groves	Royal Philharmonic Orchestra, Ladies of the Philharmonia Chorus	Sanctuary Classics	recorded in July 1987 at the Watford Town Hall
1988	William Boughton	Philharmonia Orchestra	Nimbus	recorded 11–12 January 1988 at the Royal Albert Hall, London
1988	Adrian Leaper	Slovak Radio Symphony Orchestra, Women of the Slovak Radio Symphony Chorus	Naxos	recorded 26–30 November 1988 in Bratislava
1988	Sir Charles Mackerras	Royal Liverpool Philharmonic Orchestra, Women's Voices of the Liverpool Philharmonic Choir	Virgin Classics	recorded in June 1988 at the Liverpool Philharmonic Hall; released in 1989
1988	Sir Colin Davis	Berlin Philharmonic Orchestra, Frauenchor des Rundfunkchores Berlin	Philips	recorded in December 1988 in the Berliner Philharmonie
1989	James Levine	Chicago Symphony Orchestra, Women of the Chicago Symphony Chorus	Deutsche Grammophon	recorded in June 1989 in Orchestra Hall, Chicago; released in 1991
1989	Hilary Davan Wetton	London Philharmonic Orchestra	Collins Classics	recorded at All Saints Church, Tooting; also released in 2011 as cover CD with Classic FM Magazine, issue 198
1989	Zubin Mehta	New York Philharmonic, Women of the New York Choral Artists	Teldec	recorded in November 1989
1991	Yevgeny Svetlanov	Philharmonia Orchestra, Women's Voices of The Sixteen	Collins Classics	recorded in November 1991
1991	James Judd	Royal Philharmonic Orchestra, Choristers of King's College Choir, Cambridge	Denon	Boys' choir used in Neptune; recorded 1–2 December 1991 in Walthamstow Assembly Hall, London
1992	Ross Pople	London Festival Orchestra, Choristers of St Paul's Cathedral Choir	ASV	Boys' choir used in Neptune; recorded at All Saints Church, Tooting
1992	Marko Munih	Radio Symphony Orchestra Ljubljana, Ladies of the RTV Chamebr Choir	Pentagon Classics	
1993	Mike Batt	Royal Philharmonic Orchestra; Ladies from the John McCarthy Chorus	Guild	recorded 25 August 1993 at Watford Town Hall; released in 2018
1993	Vernon Handley	Royal Philharmonic Orchestra, Women of the Ambrosian Singers	Tring	recorded in October 1993 at St Augustine’s Church, Kilburn, London
1993	Christopher Seaman	National Youth Orchestra of Scotland	LINN	Mars, Jupiter, Saturn and Uranus only
1993	Sir Andrew Davis	BBC Symphony Orchestra, Women of the BBC Symphony Chorus	Teldec	recorded in December 1993 at St Augustine’s Church, Kilburn, London
1994	John Eliot Gardiner	Philharmonia Orchestra, Women's Voices of the Monteverdi Choir	Deutsche Grammophon	recorded in February 1994 at All Hallows Church, Gospel Oak, London; released in 1995
1994	José Serebrier	Melbourne Symphony Orchestra	ASV	recorded at the studios of the Australian Broadcasting Corporation
1994	Yevgeny Svetlanov	Swedish Radio Symphony Orchestra, ladies of Swedish Radio Choir	Weitblick	recorded live 3 September 1994; released in 2013
1995	Adrian Leaper	Orquesta Filarmónica de Gran Canaria	Arte Nova Classics	recorded live 25 January 1995 in the Teatro Pérez Galdós, Las Palmas de Gran Canaria
1996	Leonard Slatkin	Philharmonia Orchestra, New London Children's Choir	RCA	Children's choir used in Neptune; recorded 10-12 April 1996 in Walthamstow Assembly Hall, London; released in 1997
1996	Roy Goodman	New Queen's Hall Orchestra, Ladies of New Queen's Hall Chorus	Carlton Classics	Historically informed performance, recorded 11-12 May 1996 in Abbey Road Studio 1; released in 1997
1996	Yan Pascal Tortelier	BBC Philharmonic	BBC Music Magazine	recorded 13 July 1996 in Bridgewater Hall, Manchester; issued with the BBC Music Magazin Vol. 5, no. 1, September 1996
1997	Yoel Levi	Atlanta Symphony Orchestra, Atlanta Symphony Orchestra Chorus	Telarc	recorded 3-4 April 1997 at Woodruff Arts Center, Atlanta
1997	Andrew Litton	Dallas Symphony Orchestra, Women of the Dallas Symphony Chorus	Delos	recorded 18-21 September 1997 in McDermott Hall, Meyerson Center, Dallas; released in January 1998
1998	Djong Victorin Yu	Philharmonia Orchestra, Women of the Philharmonia Chorus	Exton	recorded 13-16 July 1998 in the Abbey Road Studios, London
1999	Rico Saccani	Budapest Philharmonic Orchestra, Women of the Chorus of the Hungarian State Opera House	BPO Live	recorded 27 March 1999 at the Hungarian State Opera House, Budapest; released in 2003
1999	Thomas Kalb	Philharmonisches Orchester Heidelberg	Antes	
2001	David Lloyd-Jones	Royal Scottish National Orchestra, Ladies of Royal Scottish National Orchestra Chorus	Naxos	recorded 17-18 February 2001 at the Glasgow City Halls; issued also on DVD in 5.1 surround sound (Dolby+DTS); includes Pluto, the Renewer by Colin Matthews
2001	Mark Elder	Hallé Orchestra, Ladies of The Hallé Choir	Hyperion	recorded 27–28 March 2001 in Bridgewater Hall, Manchester; includes Pluto, the Renewer by Colin Matthews (commissioned by the Hallé Concerts Society and first performed by the Hallé under Kent Nagano in 2000); also includes the original and modified-ending versions of Neptune
2001	Sir Roger Norrington	Stuttgart Radio Symphony Orchestra, Ladies of the SWR Vokalensemble and the chorus of the Staatsoper Stuttgart	Hänssler	recorded live 27–29 June 2001 in the Liederhalle, Stuttgart; released in 2002
2001	Dennis Russell Davies	Bruckner Orchester Linz	Chesky Records	recorded 2-4 October 2001 in the Brucknerhaus, Linz, Austria; released on SACD in 2002 and later as a digital download on Chesky's HDtracks site
2002	Paul Freeman	Czech National Symphony Orchestra	CNSO	recorded 7 & 9 2002 in the Rudolfinum, Prague; includes Pluto, the Renewer by Colin Matthews, and also the original and modified-ending versions of Neptune
2002	Sir Colin Davis	London Symphony Orchestra, Ladies of the London Symphony Chorus	LSO Live	recorded live in June 2002 at the Barbican Centre, released in 2003
2004	Owain Arwel Hughes	Royal Philharmonic Orchestra, Women of The Cambridge Singers	Warner APEX	recorded 26–27 April 2004 at Watford Colosseum; released in 2005; includes Pluto, the Renewer by Colin Matthews
2005	Yutaka Sado	NHK Symphony Orchestra	Avex	
2006	Sir Simon Rattle	Berlin Philharmonic Orchestra, Ladies of the Rundfunkchor Berlin	EMI	includes Pluto, the Renewer by Colin Matthews; recorded live 18 March 2006 in the Berliner Philharmonie
2008	Roman Brogli-Sacher	Philharmonisches Orchester der Hansestadt Lübeck, Choirs of the Theater Lübeck	Musicaphon	recorded in October 2008 at the Lübeck Musik- und Kongresshalle
2008	Paavo Järvi	Cincinnati Symphony Orchestra	Telarc	recorded 23–24 November 2008 at Music Hall, Cincinnati
2009	Vladimir Jurowski	London Philharmonic Orchestra, Ladies of the London Philharmonic Choir	LPO	recorded live 22 May 2009 at the Royal Festival Hall; released in 2010
2010	Sir Andrew Davis	BBC Philharmonic, Ladies of the Manchester Chamber Choir	Chandos	recorded 24-25 June 2010 in Bridgewater Hall, Manchester; released 2011
2013	Naoto Otomo	Tokyo Symphony Orchestra	King	
2014	David Robertson	Sydney Symphony Orchestra, Ladies of the Sydney Philharmonia Chorus	Sydney Symphony Orchestra	recorded live 11-12 July 2013, 14-15 February and 1 March 2014 in the Sydney Opera House Concert Hall and released on SACD and Blu-ray
2015	Michael Francis	National Youth Orchestra of Canada	NYO Canada	recorded 1–3 August 2015 in the McGill Multimedia Room, Schulich School of Music, McGill University, Montreal
2015	Michael Stern	Kansas City Symphony, Women of the Kansas City Symphony Chorus	Reference Recordings	recorded at the Kauffman Center for the Performing Arts, Kansas City; released in 2019
2016	Edward Gardner	National Youth Orchestra of Great Britain, CBSO Youth Chorus	Chandos	recorded 8–9 August 2016 in Symphony Hall, Birmingham; released in February 2017
2017	Andrew Litton	Bergen Philharmonic Orchestra, Ladies of the Bergen Philharmonic Choir and the Edvard Grieg Kor	BIS	recorded in February 2017 in Grieghallen, Bergen; released on SACD in 2018
2022	Daniel Harding	Bavarian Radio Symphony Orchestra, Ladies of the Chor des Bayerischen Rundfunks	BR Klassik	recorded live 25 February 2022 at the Herkulessaal, Munich
2024	Jaime Martín	Melbourne Symphony Orchestra, Women of the Melbourne Symphony Orchestra Chorus	Melbourne Symphony Orchestra	recorded in 2024 in Hamer Hall, Melbourne
2026	Sir Antonio Pappano	London Symphony Orchestra, Tenebrae	LSO Live	recorded 12 September 2024 in the Barbican Hall, London

== Holst's own two-piano transcription ==
Year	Artists	Label	Recording notes
1984	Richard Markham, David Nettle	Psyche	Recorded on 6-8 November 1984 at St Jude's Church, Hampstead Garden Suburb
1986	Richard Rodney Bennett, Susan Bradshaw	Delos	Recorded in London; released 1987
1996	Anthony Goldstone, Caroline Clemmow	Albany/Olympia/Diversions	Recorded at St John the Baptist Church, Alkborough (Lincolnshire)
1998	Len Vorster, Robert Chamberlain	Naxos	Recorded on 5 and 12 July 1997 at the Iwaki Auditorium, ABC Centre, Melbourne, Australia
2025	Ben Schoeman, Tessa Uys	Somm	Recorded on 1-2 February 2025

== Concert Band version ==
Year	Conductor	Ensemble	Label	Recording notes
1989	Eric Banks	London Symphonic Wind Orchestra	EMI Music Japan	Recorded at Abbey Road Studios on 11–12 April 1989. Wind orchestra version of the complete seven-movement suite transcribed by Cy Payne.
1994	Frederick Fennell	Tokyo Kosei Wind Orchestra	King Records, Japan	Recorded at Iruma Shimin Kaikan Hall (Saitama, Japan) on 3–4 Nov. 1994. Released in 1995. Concert band version by Takuzo Inagaki.
1994	Daniel Sieber	« Belalp » Jubilee Wind Orchestra	Tonstudio AMOS	Recorded at Zentrum Missione, Naters on 26–27 Nov. 1994. Concert band version by Pierre-Alain Bidaud, Jean-Pierre Hartmann and Daniel Sieber.
1996	James Watson	Black Dyke Mills Band	Doyen	Brass band version by Stephen Roberts.
1998	Eddie Green	University of Houston Wind Ensemble	Mark Custom	Concert band version by Merlin Patterson.
2003	Commander Yoshiiku Aoki	Japan Maritime Self-Defense Force Band, Tokyo	Universal Music Japan	Live recording at Tokyo Opera City Concert Hall on 3 February 2003. Concert band version by Tatsuya Konishi.
2005	Ton van de Kieft	Noordenwind	Molenaar Edition	Live recording at Beurs van Berlage, Amsterdam on 1 July 2005. Concert band version by Geert Schrijvers.

== Other versions ==
Year	Primary musicians	Label	Recording notes
1976	Isao Tomita	RCA	Released in 1976/1991. Free arrangement and abridgement for electronic synthesiser.
1985	Kevin Peek with Rick Wakeman and Jeff Wayne		Progressive rock version called Beyond the Planets.
1989	Ed Starink	Star Inc.	Synthesizered version.
1996	Peter Sykes	Raven	Version for organ.
2001	York2 (John York, Fiona York)	Black Box/Nimbus	Reduction for piano for four hands by the composer with Nora Day and Vally Lasker, edited by John and Fiona York.
2009	Hugh Banton	Fie	Organ transcription.
2010	Buzz Ensemble	Fidelio	Version for brass and organ.
2010	Stefan Moser	H and M	Version for organ.
2015	ZOFO (Eva-Maria Zimmermann, Keisuke Nakagoshi)	SONO Luminus	Piano duet transcription by ZOFO.
2020	Jeremy Levy Jazz Orchestra	OA2 Records	Big Band version called The Planets: Reimagined.
