= Teatro Dal Verme =

Concert venue in Milan, Italy, formerly an opera house and cinema

Coordinates: 45.4672°N 9.1815°E

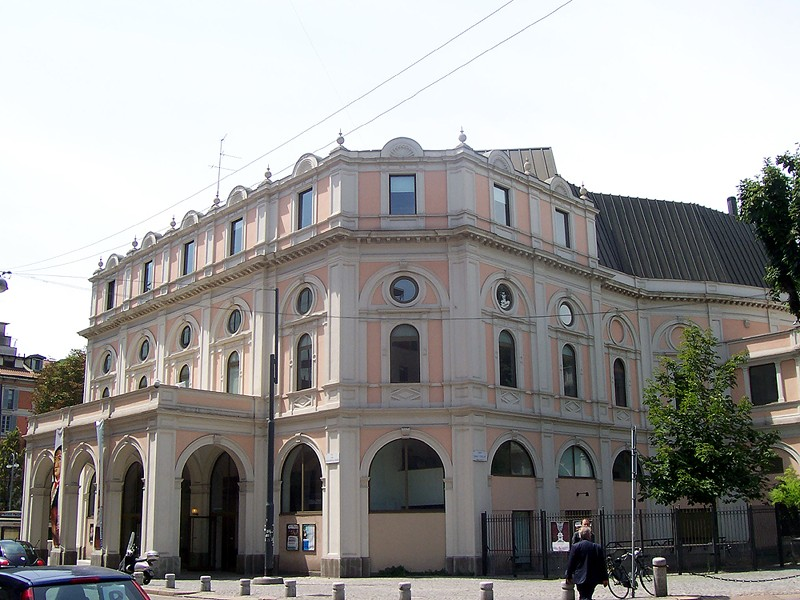
- Contemporary exterior view of the theater
- Interactive map of Teatro Dal Verme
- Address: Via San Giovanni sul Muro 2 Milan; Italy

Construction
- Opened: 14 September 1872
- Reopened: April 2001
- Architect: Giuseppe Pestagalli

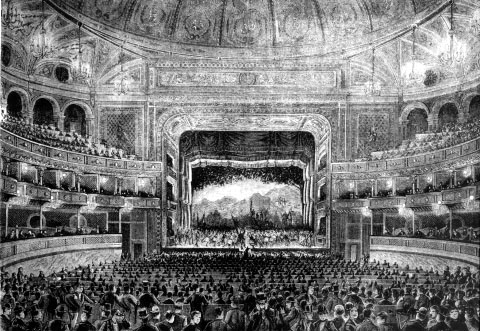
The interior of the Teatro Dal Verme c. 1875

The Teatro Dal Verme is a theatre in Milan, Italy located on the Via San Giovanni sul Muro, on the site of the former private theatre the Politeama Ciniselli. It was designed by Giuseppe Pestagalli to a commission from Count Francesco Dal Verme, and was used primarily for plays and opera performances throughout the 19th and early 20th centuries. Today, the theatre is no longer used for opera, but is a venue for concerts, plays and dance performances, as well as exhibitions and conferences.

== History ==
The original 3,000-seat theatre, surmounted by a large cupola, was constructed in the traditional horseshoe shape, with two tiers of boxes and a large gallery (or loggione) which alone contained more than 1000 seats. It opened on 14 September 1872 with a production of Meyerbeer's Les Huguenots and soon established itself as one of Italy's most important opera houses. During its "golden years", the theatre saw the world premieres of Puccini's Le Villi (31 May 1884), Leoncavallo's Pagliacci (21 May 1892), I Medici (9 November 1893) and Cowen's Signa (12 November 1893). It also saw the Italian premiere of Lehár's The Merry Widow (27 April 1907).

By the 1930s, the theatre was mainly being used as a cinema. It was then severely damaged by American aerial bombardment during World War II, after which its magnificent central cupola, which had survived the bombing, was stripped of all its metal parts by the occupying German army. It was partially rebuilt in 1946, and for a period in the 1950s it was used for the performance of musicals. It then reverted to a cinema and a political conference hall.

Starting in 1991, the theatre's interior underwent a major restructuring and renovation project which was interrupted in 1994, before being resumed in January 1999 for a budget of 23 billion lire (approx. 14 million USD). From then, the renovation work went quickly, and the renovation was completed in 2001. It now has a large modern auditorium, the Sala Grande, with 1420 seats, a smaller performing space known as the Sala Piccola, with 200 seats, and a space for exhibitions and conferences, the Sala Terrazzo. Since the reopening in April 2001, it has been administered by the Fondazione I Pomeriggi Musicali, whose orchestra (the Orchestra i Pomeriggi Musicali) is resident at the theatre.

== Sources ==
- Official website
- Teatro Dal Verme article on Italian Wikipedia
