= Japanese Suite =

Orchestral composition by Gustav Holst

- Orchestral composition
- by Gustav Holst
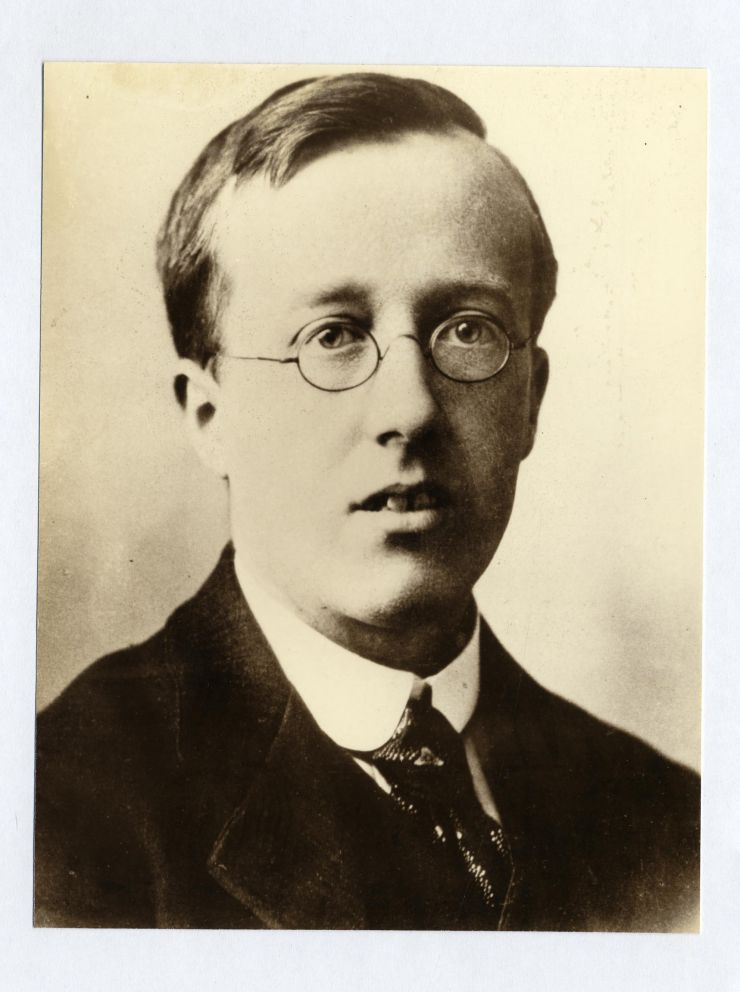
- The composer in his mid-twenties, c. 1901
- Opus: 33
- Composed: 1915
- Dedication: To the Amanuensis (Vally Lasker)
- Performed: 1 September 1919: London
- Movements: Six, including four dance pieces

Japanese Suite, Op. 33 is a short orchestral work by the English composer Gustav Holst, completed in 1915. The first concert performance was given by the Bradford Permanent Orchestra on 22 March 1919. It was the first of Holst's works to be performed at a Queen's Hall Promenade Concert, on 1 September 1919, with the composer conducting the New Queen's Hall Orchestra. After this there were a small number of performances in the British provinces.

The suite resulted from Holst's collaboration with the dancer Michio Itō, who intended to use it as an accompaniment for one of his London performances. On the title page of the score, kept in the British Library, Holst wrote "I composed this piece for the Japanese dancer Michio Ito, who provided the themes for the parts other than the marionette dance."

== Japanese folk tunes ==
Most of the main melodies in the Japanese Suite are based on traditional Japanese folk tunes. Holst sat in Itō's dressing room and took notes, while the dancer whistled the tunes to him.

The work is divided into four dance pieces, and includes a prelude, interlude and finale:

Prelude: Song of the Fisherman

1. Ceremonial Dance
2. Dance of the Marionette

Interlude: Song of the Fisherman

3. Dance under the Cherry Tree
4. Finale: Dance of the Wolf

Itō supplied all the themes except for the Dance of the Marionette. Japanese themes include Edo Lullaby which is referenced in Dance Under the Cherry Tree. In Holst's autograph sketch, Dance of the Wolf is entitled Dance of the Fox. One of Itō's dance pieces at the Coliseum was entitled Moonlight Fox.

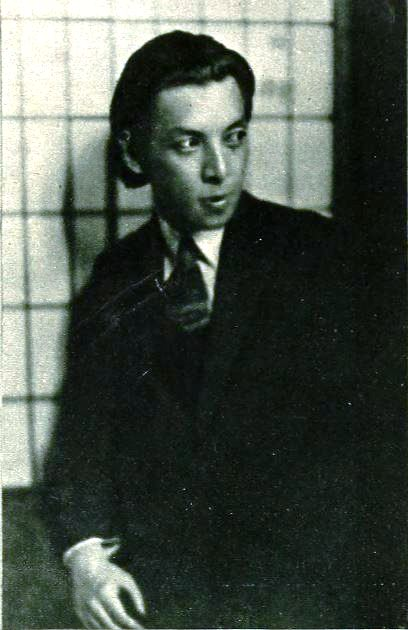
Michio Itō, c. 1919. Photograph by Marcia Stein.

In 1921, Holst was commissioned to write a ballet, The Lure, and modelled one of its dances on Dance of the Marionette from this suite.

== Origin of the work ==
According to music professor Midori Takeishi, Holst attended one of Itō's short performances at the London Coliseum in the period from 10 to 22 May 1915. She says that Itō's performance included four dances: 1) Green Dance of the Pine Trees; 2) Sitting Dance; 3) Japanese Woman with Umbrella and Fan; and 4) Moonlight Fox.

Takeishi says that for these performances, Itō had hurriedly arranged a small-scale musical accompaniment, possibly using Japanese instruments or a piano.

In one of Holst's notebooks from this period, Itō's residential address has been written in the dancer's handwriting. Takeishi also observes that Itō was very short of money, even pawning his belongings, and would not have been able to pay Holst a fee. She says that there is no evidence to suggest that Itō ever used the work in a performance. By September 1916, Itō had moved from London to New York.

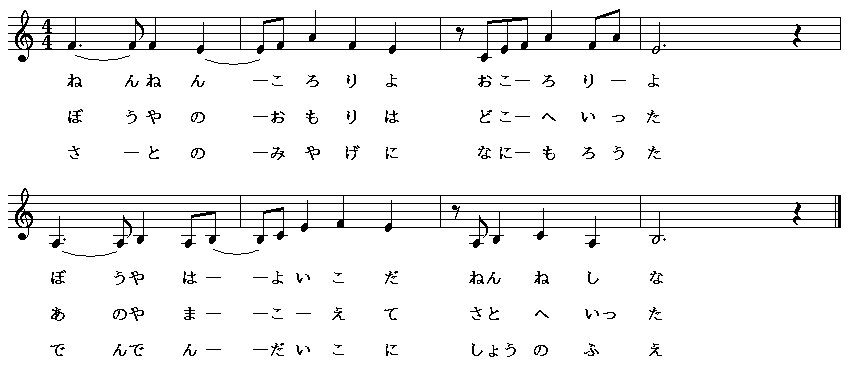
Holst drew upon Edo Lullaby for Dance Under the Cherry Tree.

== Reception ==
Writing in The Musical Times in December 1919, Edwin Evans reviewed Holst's development as a composer after the end of his 'Sanskrit period', with recent major works such as The Planets and The Hymn of Jesus. Evans mentioned the Japanese Suite along with several other minor works, and said that while originally planned for a Michio Itō performance at the Coliseum, it had '...now taken its place in the repertoire'.

In the same publication, Richard Capell in 1927 described it as among the most likeable of Holst's smaller instrumental works, along with A Fugal Concerto and the St Paul's Suite.

In his book Britten and the Far East, Mervyn Cooke describes it as an attempt by Holst to 'integrate Japanese modality' with the composer's own European harmonic approach. Cooke observes that Holst was working on the suite concurrently with 'Mercury' from his suite The Planets Op. 32. Writing in The Guardian, Andrew Clements suggests that, like The Planets, the work displays some modernist influences.

An early available recording from 1971 was conducted by Adrian Boult, who had maintained a lifelong friendship with Holst.

== Instrumentation ==
Holst scored the Japanese Suite for two flutes, piccolo, oboe, cor anglais, two clarinets, two bassoons, four horns, two trumpets, three trombones, tuba, timpani, glockenspiel, gong, xylophone, cymbals, sleigh bells, bass drum, harp and strings. A typical performance takes from 10 to 12 minutes. John Boyd has arranged a version for concert band.

== Score ==
Japanese Suite at the IMSLP Petrucci Music Library

== Recordings ==
Orchestra	Conductor	Year	Venue	Label
London Symphony Orchestra	Sir Adrian Boult	1971	Walthamstow Assembly Hall	Lyrita
Philharmonia Orchestra	Djong Victorin Yu	1998	Royal Festival Hall	Exton
BBC Philharmonic	Andrew Davis	2011	BBC Manchester studio	Chandos
Ulster Orchestra	JoAnn Falletta	2012	Ulster Hall	Naxos
Argovia Philharmonic	Douglas Bostock	2015	Kultur & Kongresshaus, Aarau, Switzerland	MBM Musikproduktion
BBC National Orchestra of Wales	Barry Wordsworth	2024	BBC Studio 2, Maida Vale, London	BBC Music Magazine

Alternative arrangements

- In 2013, Goldstone & Clemmow recorded a version arranged for two pianos (label: Divine Art).
- In 2015, a version for saxophone quartet was recorded by Japanese saxophonist Masataka Hirano and the Blue Aurora Saxophone Quartet (label: Naxos).
- In 2016, Stephen W. Pratt conducted the Indiana University Wind Ensemble in a recording of John Boyd's arrangement for concert band (University streaming service).
- In 2024, Marc Reift conducted the Philharmonic Wind Orchestra in a recording with a new arrangement by John Glenesk Mortimer (label: Marcophon).

Sources: WorldCat and Apple Classical
