= Walter Sichel =

Walter Sydney Sichel (1855–1933) was an English biographer and lawyer, the brother of Edith Helen Sichel, of German-Jewish descent, born in London and educated at Harrow and at Balliol College, Oxford.

He studied law and was called to the bar in 1879. He wrote two law books and made contributions to the reviews. Additionally, he wrote:

- The Squires [by Aston Ryot (Σ)], an Aristophanic Burlesque (1885)
- Bolingbroke (1902)
- Disraeli, A Study in Personality and Ideas (1904)
- The Life of Lord Beaconsfield (1904)
- Emma, Lady Hamilton (new edition, 1905)
- The Life of Richard Brinsley Sheridan (two volumes, 1909)
- Sterne, A Study (1910)
