= Letters of Charles Lamb =

Letters by writer Charles Lamb

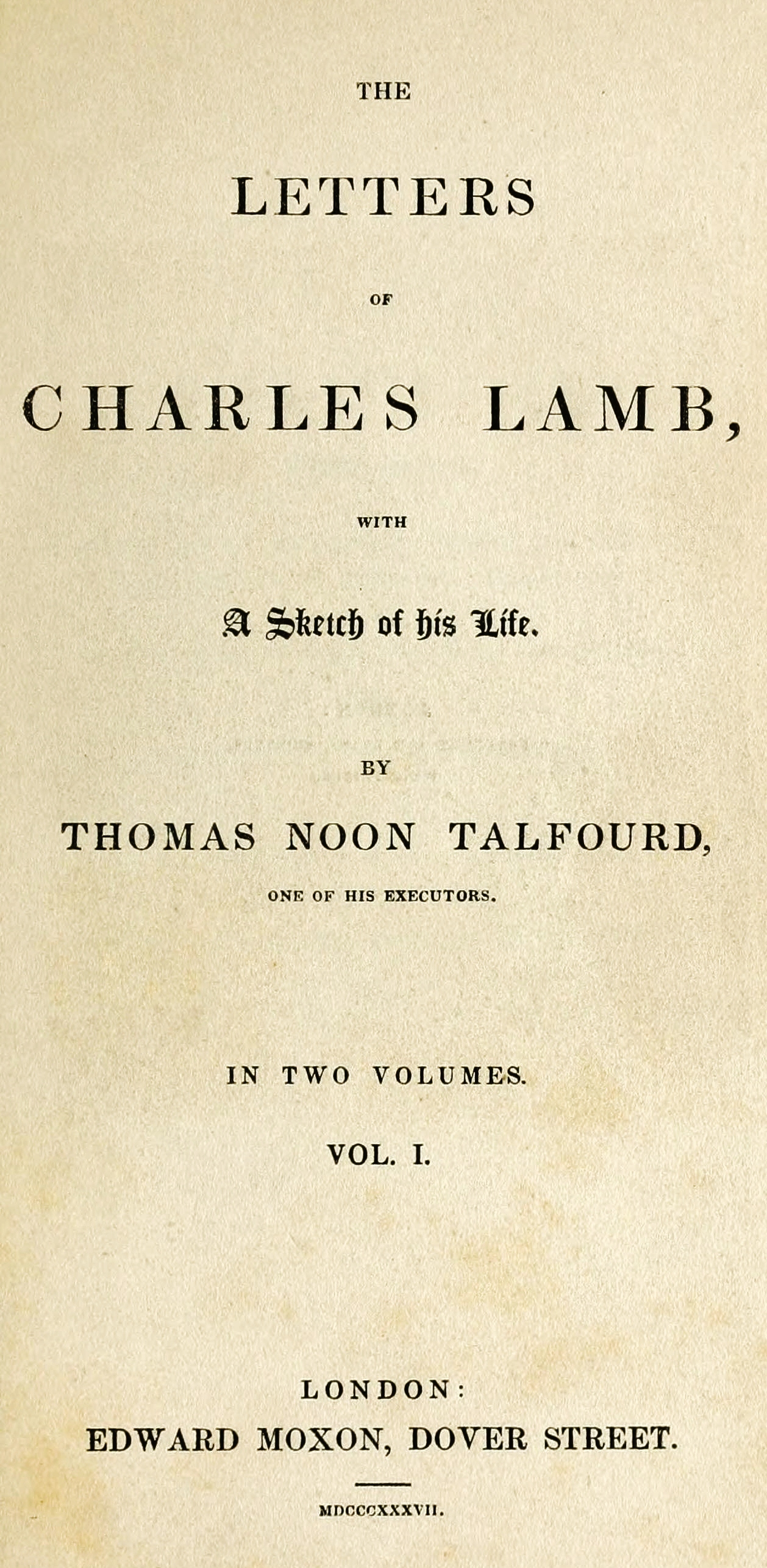
Title page to the 1837 Talfourd edition of Lamb's letters

The 19th-century English writer Charles Lamb's letters were addressed to, among others, William Wordsworth, Samuel Taylor Coleridge, William Godwin, and Thomas Hood, all of whom were close friends. They are valued for the light they throw on the English literary world in the Romantic era and on the evolution of Lamb's essays, and still more for their own "charm, wit and quality".

== Manuscripts ==
More than 1,150 of Lamb's letters survive, scattered among institutions and private collections in Britain and the United States. The largest collection, comprising about 200 letters, is in the Huntington Library in San Marino, California. There are very few existing letters addressed to Lamb apart from those sent by his friend Thomas Manning, since Lamb usually destroyed his old correspondence. Lamb wrote his letters in a "bold free hand and a fearless flourish" (his own words), which present no great difficulties to editors, though his spelling and punctuation were sometimes erratic.

== Analysis ==
Lamb's main correspondents were the poets William Wordsworth, Samuel Taylor Coleridge, Robert Southey, Thomas Hood, Bernard Barton, Mary Matilda Betham and Bryan Procter; the philosopher and novelist William Godwin; the music critic William Ayrton; the publishers Edward Moxon, William Hone, Charles Ollier, Charles Cowden Clarke and J. A. Hessey; the statistician John Rickman; the actress Fanny Kelly; the political agitator Thomas Allsop; the Sinologist Thomas Manning; the lawyer Henry Crabb Robinson; also John Bates Dibdin, member of a theatrical family, and Robert Lloyd from a literary Quaker family. The surviving letters extend over a period of nearly 40 years, beginning in May 1796 and ending only a few days before his death in December 1834. In the first sequence of 30 letters written to Coleridge he minutely criticises his friend's poems, advising him to abandon conventional poetic diction and "cultivate simplicity". The influence he exercised on his friend is seen as crucial in preparing Coleridge for the Romantic revolution that he and Wordsworth launched two years later in their Lyrical Ballads. Almost from the beginning the letters show Lamb's sense of duty to his family and friends, but after a few years, without abandoning his moral convictions, Lamb found a lighter means of expression. In an 1801 letter he wrote, "I have had a time of seriousness, and I have known the importance and reality of a religious belief. Latterly, I acknowledge, much of my seriousness has gone off…but I still retain at bottom a conviction of the truth, and a certainty of the usefulness of religion." In the later letters it is often possible to see Lamb forming and developing the ideas that he later presented in fully matured form in the Essays of Elia and other magazine pieces, and in this way they proved to be essential to his career as a published writer.

The humour and (as he often said) "nonsense" of his letters is sometimes seen as a disguise for mental instability and deep anguish. The essayist Augustine Birrell wrote that "He took refuge in trivialities seriously, and played the fool in order to remain sane." The letters have a great deal to say about Lamb's incessant reading, often among 17th century writers, and it has been argued that his love of Robert Burton, Thomas Browne and the Jacobean tragedies may show an underlying depression and despair which answered to theirs. Lamb's words on Burton have frequently been taken as applying to himself: "Burton was a man often assailed by deepest melancholy, and at other times much given to laughing and jesting, as is the way with melancholy men."

Thackeray was so impressed by the beauty of Lamb's character as revealed in his letters that he once pressed one of them to his forehead and exclaimed "Saint Charles!" It was the opinion of Thomas Noon Talfourd, who knew Lamb well, that there was scarcely one of his letters "which has not some tinge of that quaint sweetness, some hint of that peculiar union of kindness and whim, which distinguishes him from all other poets and humorists." Lamb's reputation as a writer may have fallen since the 19th and early 20th centuries, at any rate among academic critics, but he has never been short of readers who agree with the essayist E. V. Lucas as to "the value and importance of these letters, their good sense, their wit, their humanity, their fun, their timeliness and timelessness".

== Publication history ==
As early as February 1835 a decision was made to prepare a collection of Lamb's letters. Thomas Noon Talfourd was chosen as the editor, and his Letters of Charles Lamb appeared in 1837. 180 of Lamb's letters appeared in this collection, according to Edwin Marrs's count, though Talfourd's contents page suggests a different number because of his (and several later editors') practice of separating and recombining passages to form, in effect, letters that never were. The number he could print was limited by the need to protect the feelings of Lamb's surviving friends, and still more those of his sister Mary, whose periodic fits of insanity Lamb had many times explicitly referred to. With Mary's death the need for tactful suppression became less pressing, and a supplementary collection consisting of 82 entirely new letters, Talfourd's Final Memorials of Charles Lamb, appeared in 1848.

A projected third edition of the letters was to have been edited first by Talfourd and then by William Carew Hazlitt, but both editors successively abandoned the job. The editorship was then given to the journalist George Augustus Henry Sala, who completed the first volume of a Complete Correspondence and Works of Charles Lamb. This was printed in 1868, but no further volumes were ever produced. A new Complete Correspondence and Works of Charles Lamb, edited by the drama critic Thomas Purnell, containing 337 letters, appeared in 1870 in 4 volumes, the letters being also issued separately in one volume. Another drama critic, Percy Fitzgerald, edited a Life, Letters and Writings of Charles Lamb in 1876 with 451 letters, and this, like all previous collections, was published by Edward Moxon.

William Carew Hazlitt then returned to the task he had previously abandoned, and produced a Letters of Charles Lamb in 1886, based on Talfourd's two collections but with much revision and addition, so that the number of letters now totalled 488. The Letters of Charles Lamb were edited only two years later by Alfred Ainger in 1888, and re-edited in 1900 and 1904; these collections numbered 414, 446 and 464 letters respectively, making them in point of size inferior to Hazlitt's edition, and further disfigured by a good deal of bowdlerisation. An edition by William Macdonald, containing 581 letters, appeared in 1903. The Letters of Charles Lamb, issued by the Bibliophile Society of Boston in 1905 with an introduction by Henry Howard Harper, increased the tally considerably to 746 letters.

The first of E. V. Lucas's editions appeared as volumes 6 and 7 of his Works of Charles and Mary Lamb (1903–1905), and for the first time included Mary's correspondence on equal terms. It contained only 590 letters, but he highlighted one of the problems which had caused his and several previous editions to leave out easily findable material:

Owing to the curious operations of the law of copyright, it will not for at least forty-two years be possible for any one edition of Lamb's correspondence to contain all the letters. To-day, in order to possess a set complete down to the present time, one must purchase at least nine, and possibly more, works, amounting to many volumes―among them Charles Lamb and the Lloyds, of which I was the editor, but which I am debarred from using.

His second edition was published in 1912 with 604 letters. His third edition, The Letters of Charles Lamb, to which is Added Those of His Sister Mary Lamb (1935), included as many as 1,027 letters, Lucas's publishers having negotiated a solution to the copyright problems, so that he was able to claim that "The present edition of the letters of Charles Lamb is the first to bring all the known material into one work." Even Lucas's harshest critics acknowledge that the 1935 edition's completeness made it the best available up to that point, but several papers in academic journals by George L. Barnett and other Lamb scholars have made it clear that the texts are unreliable. Barnett complained that Lucas appeared not to have read manuscript letters of whose location he was well aware, that on the contrary

many, if not most, of the letters are based on previous and faulty editions, and that Lucas has failed to avoid the tendency of editors of Lamb's letters to perpetuate errors and to inaugurate others by overzealous emendation, excessive editing, and downright carelessness.

He elsewhere referred to "faulty dating, erroneous location of manuscripts, incorrect transcription of text, and misinformation in the notes".

In the years 1975 to 1978 three volumes of a new edition of Charles and Mary Lamb's letters were published by Edwin W. Marrs, which included many new letters discovered during the previous 40 years. Lamb's life was covered up to 1817, and further volumes were intended to carry on up to his death in 1834, but to date none have appeared. The three published volumes have attracted great praise for their exceptionally full annotation and for the completeness and accuracy of the texts.

== Modern editions ==
- E. V. Lucas (ed.) The Letters of Charles Lamb, to which are Added Those of His Sister Mary Lamb. London: J. M. Dent & Sons, Methuen & Co., 1935. 3 volumes. Reprinted by AMS Press, New York, 1968.
- Edwin W. Marrs Jr. (ed.) The Letters of Charles and Mary Anne Lamb
  - Volume I: Letters of Charles Lamb 1796–1801. Ithaca and London: Cornell University Press, 1975. ISBN 0801409306
  - Volume II: 1801–1809. Ithaca and London: Cornell University Press, 1976. ISBN 0801409772
  - Volume III: 1809–1817. Ithaca and London: Cornell University Press, 1978. ISBN 0801411297
