= Edith Helen Sichel =

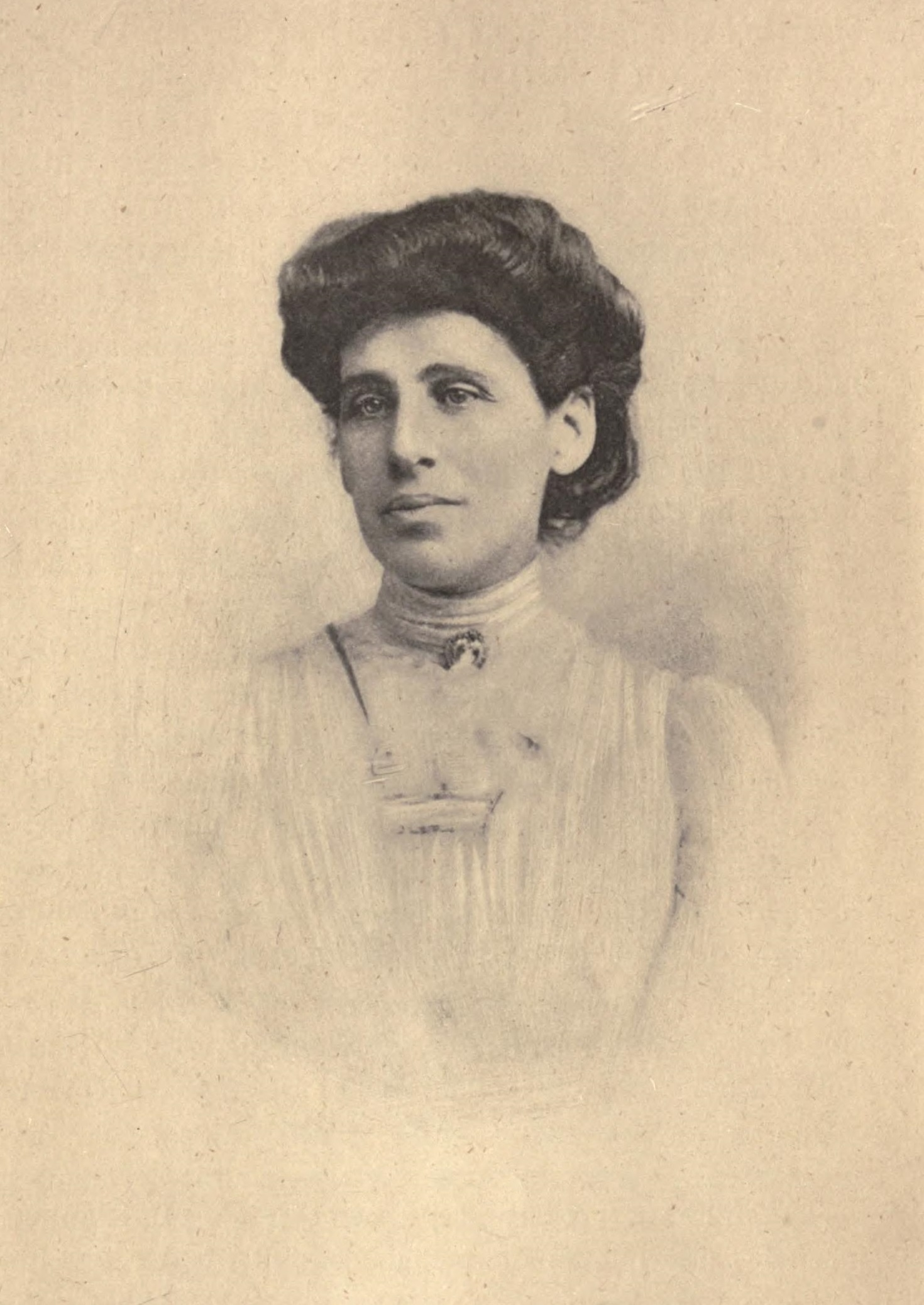
Edith Helen Sichel

Edith Helen Sichel (1862-1914) was an English author, sister of Walter Sichel. She was born on 13 December 1862, in London, to Jewish migrants from Germany who converted to Christianity, and educated at home by private teachers.

She died on 13 August 1914 in Carnforth (Lancashire).

== Bibliography ==
- Two Salons (1895)
- The Household of the Lafayettes (1897)
- Women and Men of the French Renaissance (1901)
- Catherine de' Medici and the French Reformation (1905);
- Life and Letters of Alfred Ainger (1906)
- The Later Years of Catherine de' Medici (1908)
- Michel de Montaigne (1911)
- The Renaissance (1914)
