= Robert Edward Francillon =

English journalist and author

Robert Edward Francillon (1841–1919) was an English journalist and author. He was active in the later decades of the 19th century, and rose to be managing editor of The Globe.

== Life and career ==
Born in Gloucester, Francillon trained as a barrister but turned to journalism. He was at various times a contributor to Blackwood's Magazine and an editor of Tatler. He contributed for many years to the Christmas numbers of The Gentleman's Magazine, and sold many short stories to newspapers. (Most of those that were published in Australia can be read online thanks to the Trove service of the National Library of Australia.) His novel Jack Doyle's Daughter lets a Lincolnshire gentleman loose in Bohemian London. It has been called an "incoherent" tale involving an "heiress with six possible fathers".

Francillon's review "George Eliot's First Romance (1876)" defends Daniel Deronda from early critics. He notes that as a romance, it differs in kind from Adam Bede or Middlemarch: "It lies so far outside George Eliot's other works in every important respect as to make direct comparison impossible."

In 1890, Francillon was reported to be the managing editor of the London newspaper The Globe.

Along with Swinburne, Francillon belonged to Thomas Purnell's literary club "Decemviri", and was an early member of the neo-Jacobite body known as the Order of the White Rose. Francillon married a daughter of the composer John Barnett, who was also a goddaughter of Franz Liszt.

== Some works by Francillon ==
Short stories and novelettes, published in Australian newspapers

- Olympia
- A Queen of Trumps
- Queen Cophetua
- A Bad Bargain
- Esther's Glove
- The Seal of the Snake
- The Way of the Wind, first published in the London Almanac in 1888
- Golden Rod
- No Conjuror
- Fad and Her Fetish
- The Luck of Luke Parris
- Veni, Vidi, Vici
- A Learned Lady
- Silver and Gold
- Double Sixes
- M or N
- Owen Murtagh's Girl
- An Obstinate Blockhead

Songs

- Frederic Hymen Cowen; R. E. Francillon (lyricist) (1870), It was a dream
- Frederic Hymen Cowen; R. E. Francillon (lyricist), Why
- Frederic Hymen Cowen; R. E. Francillon (lyricist) (1880), Almost, Boosey & Co.; Melbourne: Nicholson & Ascherberg

Books

- R. E. Francillon (1871), Earl's Dene: a novel, New York: Harper & Brothers
- R. E. Francillon (1877), Rare Good Luck: a fortune in seven strokes, New York: D. Appleton & Co.
- R. E. Francillon (1886), Golden Bells: a peal in seven changes, New York: Harper & Brothers
- R. E. Francillon (1888), A Christmas Rose: a blossom in seven petals, New York: Harper & Brothers
- R. E. Francillon (1893), Ropes of Sand: a novel, London: Chatto & Windus
- R. E. Francillon (1894), Jack Doyle's Daughter, Chatto & Windus
- R. E. Francillon (1894), Gods and Heroes; or, The Kingdom of Jupiter, Ginn and Company
- R. E. Francillon (1900), Mid-Victorian Memories, London: Hodder
