= Alfred Ainger =

19th century English biographer and critic

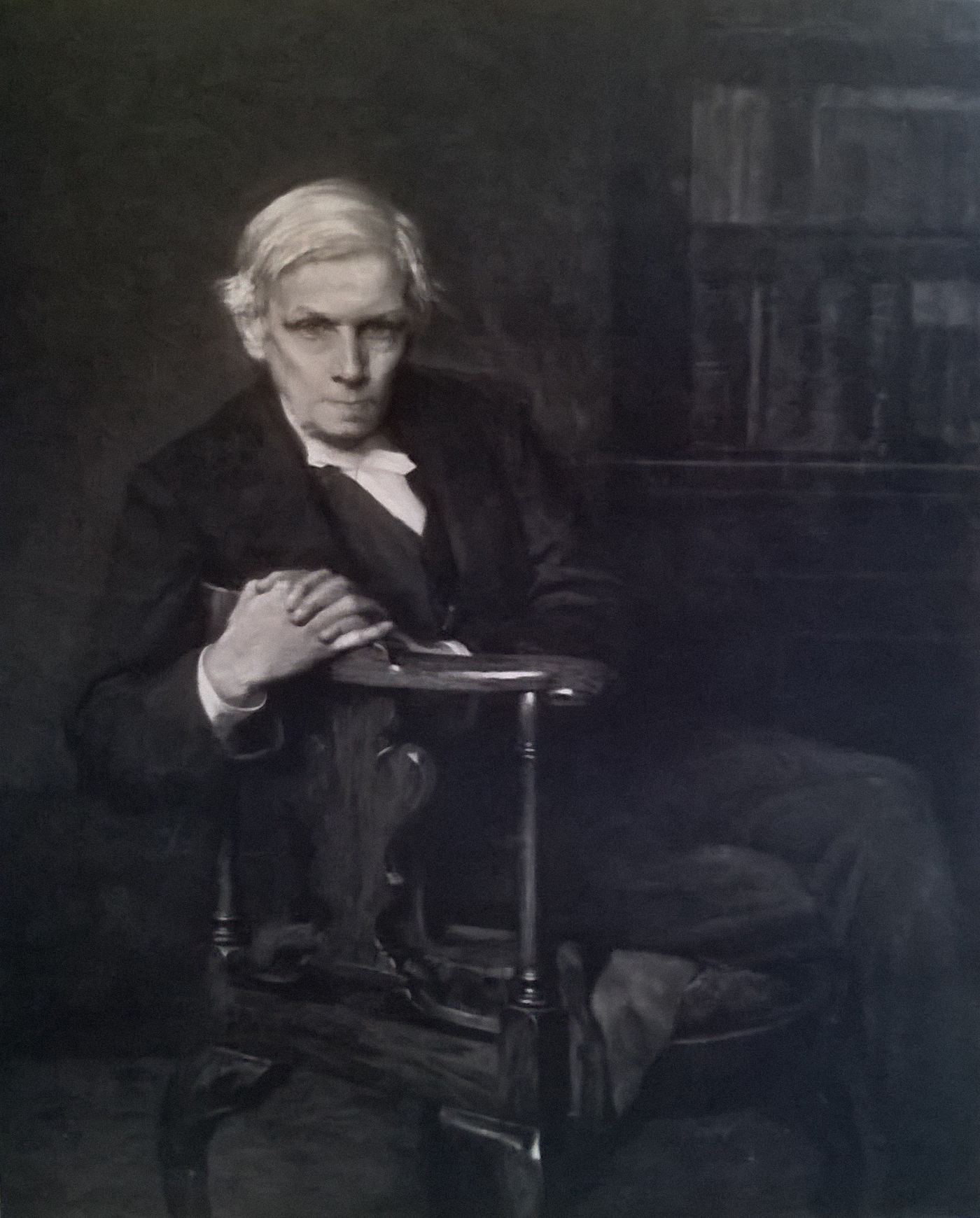
- Portrait of Alfred Aigner by Hugh Goldwin Rivière
- Born: 9 February 1837
- Died: 8 February 1904 (aged 66)
- Occupations: Biographer and critic

Alfred Ainger (9 February 1837 – 8 February 1904) was an English biographer and critic.

== Biography ==
The son of an architect in London, he was educated at University College School, King's College London and Trinity College, Cambridge, from where he subsequently entered the Church, and, after holding various minor preferments (including teaching at Sheffield Collegiate School from 1864 to 1866), became Master of the Temple in July 1894. He was appointed an Honorary Chaplain to Queen Victoria 28 January 1895, and a Chaplain-in-Ordinary to her Majesty 2 March 1896.

He wrote memoirs of Thomas Hood and George Crabbe, but is best known for his biography of Charles Lamb and his edition of Lamb's works in 6 volumes (1883–88). He was a contributor the Dictionary of National Biography, writing the entries on Lamb, Alfred Tennyson, Frederick Tennyson, Charles Tennyson Turner and George du Maurier, under the initials "A.A.".

In 1906 Edith Sichel published a 354-page biography of Ainger.

== Works ==
- Crabbe (1903), in the English Men of Letters series
- Charles Lamb (1908)
- The Letters of Charles Lamb (Volume I – Volume II)
- Lectures and essays (Volume 1)
- Lectures and essays (Volume 2)
