= Pauline (Cowen opera) =

Opera in four acts with music by Frederic H. Cowen

Pauline is an opera in four acts with music by the British composer Frederic H. Cowen to a libretto by Henry Hersee after the 1838 play The Lady of Lyons by Edward Bulwer-Lytton, first performed by the Carl Rosa Opera Company on 22 September 1876 at the Lyceum Theatre, London.
