= Thomas Purnell (critic) =

British author and drama critic (1834–1889)

Thomas Purnell (1834–1889) was a British author, best known as a London drama critic writing under the pseudonym "Q".

== Life ==
The son of Robert Purnell, he was born in Tenby, Pembrokeshire, Wales, in 1834. He matriculated at Trinity College, Dublin in 1852, but then went to London and became a journalist.

In 1862 Purnell was recommended by Sir Thomas Duffus Hardy for the post of assistant secretary and librarian of the Archæological Institute of Great Britain and Ireland, which he retained until 1866. In 1870–1871 he contributed to the Athenæum, under the signature "Q.", a series of drama criticisms that attracted notice for their style and for their censures. Charles Reade and Tom Taylor published replies to his remarks on their works.

Purnell founded a small literary club, the "Decemviri", which included A. C. Swinburne, Whistler, Robert Edward Francillon, and Joseph Knight. He came to know Giuseppe Mazzini, to whom he introduced Swinburne and others. He died after a long illness on 17 December 1889, at Lloyd Square, Pentonville, London.

== Works ==
In 1871 Purnell edited Charles Lamb's Correspondence and Works, and organised the Charles Lamb centenary dinner. He was the author of the following:

- Literature and its Professors, London, 1867
- Dramatists of the Present Day (reprinted from the Athenæum), by Q., London, 1871
- To London and elsewhere, London, 1881
- The Lady Drusilla: a Psychological Romance, London, 1886
- Dust and Diamonds: Essays, London, 1888

Purnell also edited the Historia Quatuor Regum Angliæ of John Herd (1511–1584) for the Roxburghe Club in 1868.

== Notes ==
Attribution

This article incorporates text from a publication now in the public domain: Lee, Sidney, ed. (1896). "Purnell, Thomas". Dictionary of National Biography. Vol. 47. London: Smith, Elder & Co.
