= Signa (opera) =

Opera by Frederic Hymen Cowen

Signa is an opera originally conceived in four acts with music by the British composer Frederic H. Cowen with a libretto by Gilbert Arthur à Beckett, with revisions by H.A. Rudall and Frederic Edward Weatherly after Ouida, with an Italian translation by Giannandrea Mazzucato, first performed in a reduced three-act version at the Teatro Dal Verme, Milan on 12 November 1893. It was later given in a two-act version at Covent Garden, London on 30 June 1894.
