= Bradford Festival Choral Society =

Choir in Bradford, England

Bradford Festival Choral Society is an amateur choir in Bradford, England.

The choir was established in 1856 after the opening of St George's Hall. Up to 200 singers were massed together for the first Bradford Musical Festival that year. Samuel Smith (Bradford's mayor from 1851 to 1854) was its first president and William Jackson its first conductor. The choir was summoned to sing before Queen Victoria in June 1858 at Buckingham Palace.

At its peak in 1895 the choir included over 300 singers. Frederick Cowen was appointed conductor in 1898. In 1906 the choir was invited by the Philharmonic Society to sing in Beethoven's Ninth Symphony at the Queen's Hall in London to mark its Golden Jubilee year.

Sir Malcolm Sargent became the Society’s conductor in 1925, continuing for 26 years. In 1953 the choir sang in the first regional UK performance of Janáček’s Glagolitic Mass at Leeds Town Hall, after six months of practice. It was conducted by Maurice Miles, with Julius Patzak singing the tenor solos. Benjamin Britten was in the audience. Sir David Willcocks was the conductor from 1956 until 1974.

Today the choir still has around 150 singers. In 2023 it was shortlisted for the Royal Philharmonic Society Inspiration Award.
