= Lionel Cowen =

English painter

- Born: 1846
- Died: 7 August 1895 (aged 49); Indian Ocean
- Relatives: Frederic Hymen Cowen (brother)

Lionel Jonas Cowen (1846 – 7 August 1895) was an English painter, known for his portraits, genre scenes, and interiors.

Cowen first exhibited in 1869 at the Suffolk Street Gallery. He was a member of the Royal Society of British Artists, and regularly exhibited at the Royal Academy. He died of nephritis at sea on 7 August 1895, while on his way home from Hobart Town, Tasmania, where he had been for some years engaged in the practise of his art.
