= John Dunn (violinist) =

English violinist and composer

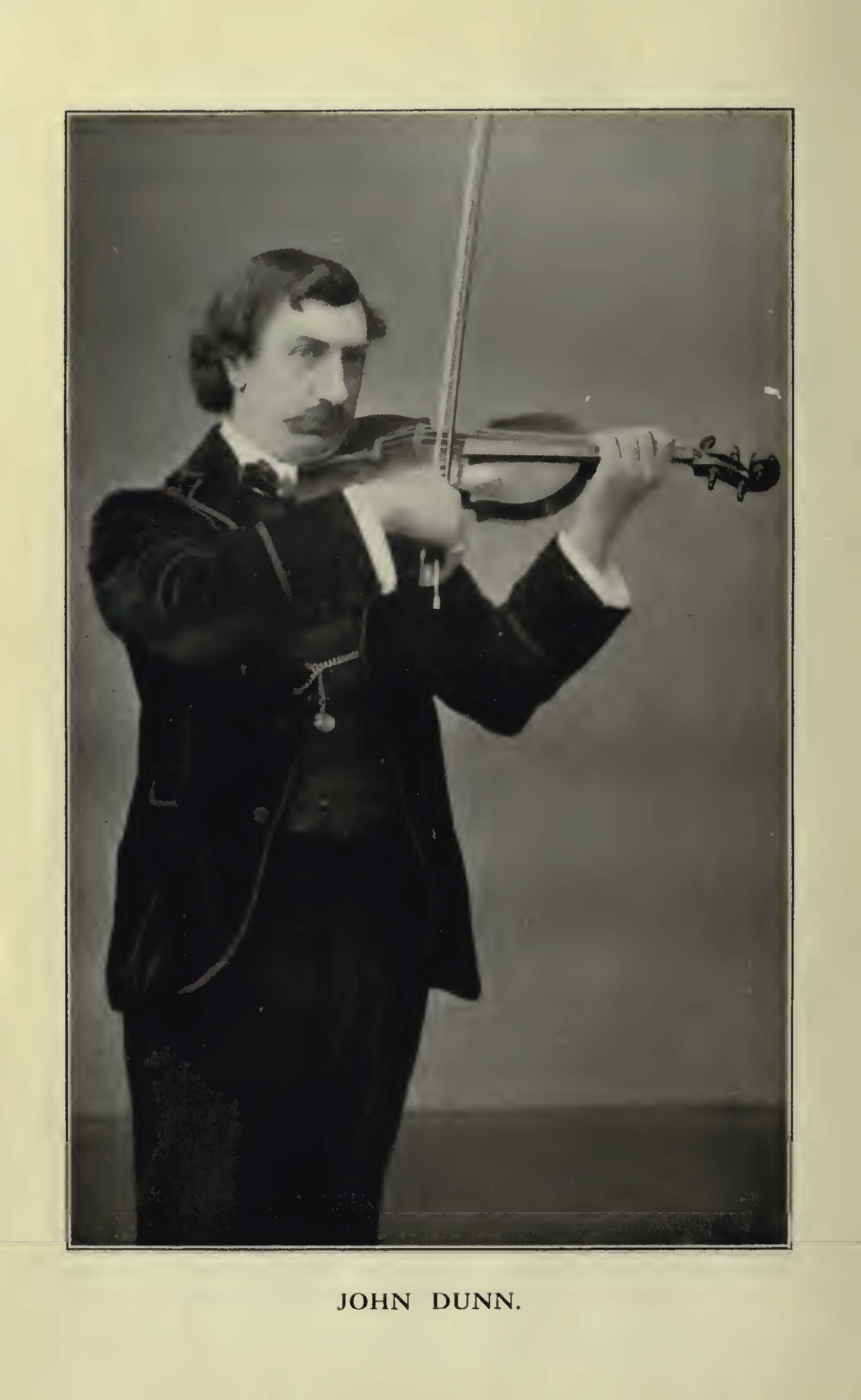
John Dunn

John Dunn (16 February 1866, Kingston upon Hull – 18 December 1940, Harrogate) was the most prominent English violinist at the turn of the 20th century and composer. He was considered especially successful in interpreting works by Niccolò Paganini.

== Life ==
His first public performance happened when he was only 9. Soon he went to the Leipzig Conservatory. Studied with Henry Schradieck. After completing the course and returning to Britain he performed as soloist at Covent Garden (in 1882), The Proms, Crystal Palace, Glasgow Choral Union concerts, Royal Amateur Orchestral Society, bur also in Berlin and Leipzig.

In approximately 1900 he took a concert tour in America, during which he used an exotic 'Russian' pseudonym Ivan Donoiewski. In 1902 he made the first performance of Pyotr Ilyich Tchaikovsky's Violin Concerto in England.

His compositions include a Violin Concerto, a Sonatina for piano and minor pieces, among others a Soliloquy and a Berceuse. He also wrote a number of cadences to Ludwig van Beethoven's Violin Concerto.

The 1843 'John Dunn' violin by Giuseppe Rocca is named after him.

== Compositions ==
Book

- John Dunn. Violin Playing. 3rd ed.: 1915 (1st ed. 1898; 4th ed. 1923)

Musical compositions

- Petite valse de concert, Op. 4, for violin and piano (©1924)
- Fairy Oraces, Op. 5, for violin and piano (©1924)
- Caprice Chinois, Op. 6, for violin and piano (©1924)

Arrangements of works by other composers

- Caprice No.9 by Niccolò Paganini, for violin and piano (©1924)
- Nocturne by Pyotr Ilyich Tchaikovsky, in F major, for violin and piano (©1924)

== Sources ==
- Georges Foucher (1807). Treatise on the History & Construction of the Violin: With a Short Account of the Lives of Its Greatest Players and Makers. Written Especially for the Use of Students Preparing for the Examinations of the College of Violinists. E. Shore and Company. p. 71.
- Alberto Bachmann (24 July 2013). An Encyclopedia of the Violin. Courier Corporation. p. 353. ISBN 978-0-486-31824-0.
