= Huddersfield Singers =

The Huddersfield Singers

The Huddersfield Singers is based in Huddersfield, West Yorkshire, England, and is a chamber choir of 30 to 40 members. The choir was formed in 1875 as the Huddersfield Glee & Madrigal Society and performs a wide variety of sacred and secular music from all periods of musical history, ranging from the medieval to the present day.

The Huddersfield Singers is renowned for its adventurous and interesting repertoire, and takes pride in performing works by less well-known composers alongside more mainstream pieces. The choir has occasionally commissioned new music, such as for its 125th anniversary concert in July 2000, for which Arthur Butterworth composed Haworth Moor. Other composers who have written music for the choir, or dedicated pieces to it, include Gustav Holst (Wassail Song, 1932) and John Gardner (Waltzsongs, 1996).

The choir's character and adventurous repertoire has been shaped primarily (in its modern Huddersfield Singers guise) by its longest-serving conductor, Philip Honnor, who was in charge from 1990 to 2012. Dr Jonathan Brigg took the role during 2013 and was succeeded from the start of the 2014–2015 season by Alexander Douglas. Since the beginning of the 2017–2018 season, the choir's conductor was Daniel Gordon, who was succeeded by Alexander Woodrow in September 2023. Woodrow had previously served as the choir's accompanist throughout the 2022-2023 season, and combines this role with positions in Leeds, including as Organist and Director of Music at Leeds Minster.

The choir is a registered charity (number 507768).
