= William Jackson of Masham =

English organist and composer

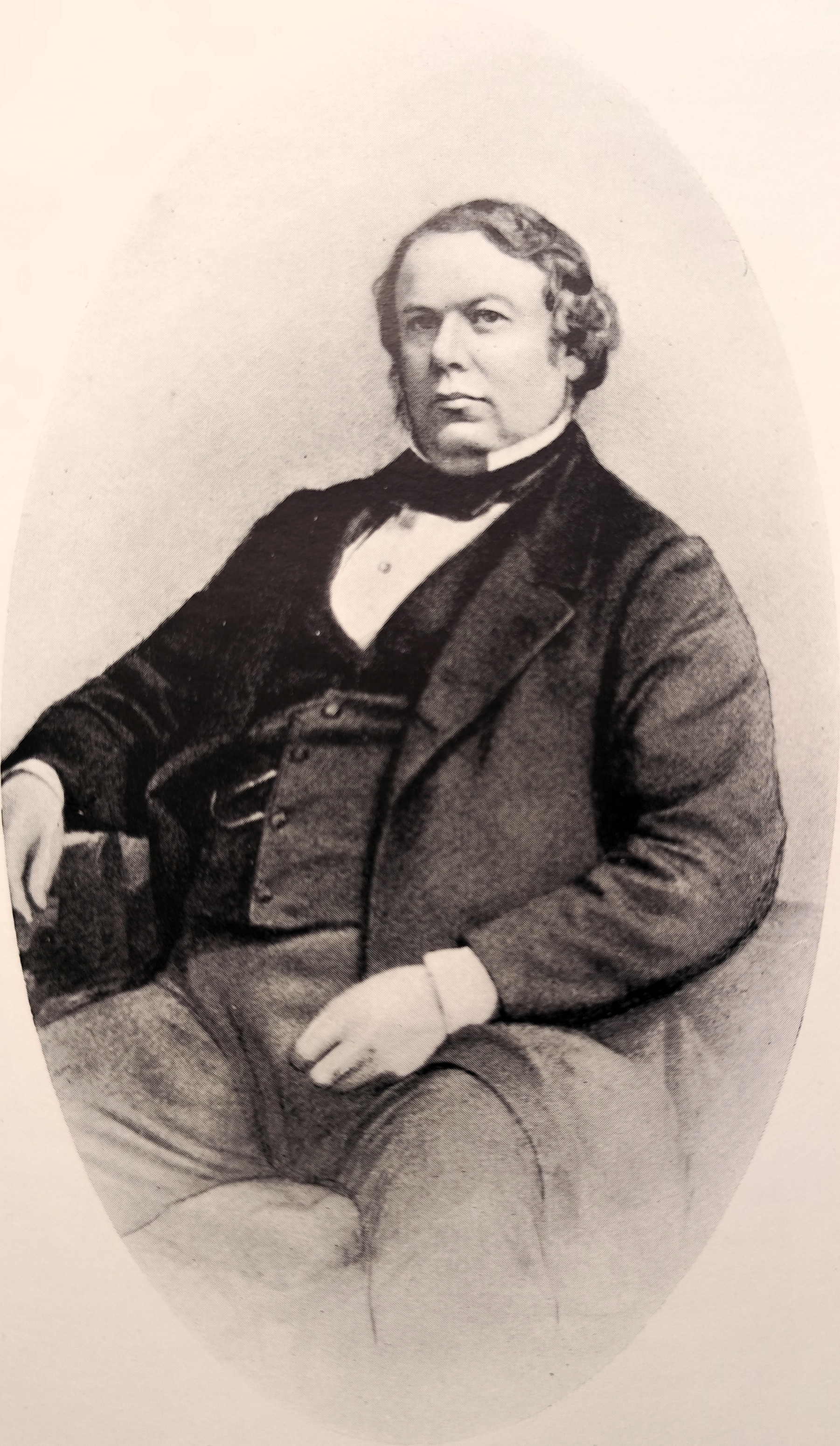
Portrait of William Jackson of Masham, Bradford Festival Choral Society conductor 1856-1866.

William Jackson (born 9 January 1815 in Masham, Yorkshire, England; died 15 April 1866 in Bradford, England) was an English organist and composer, who also spent some time being a miller, his family's profession, in their home-town.

A self-taught musician, as a child and young adult he learned to play 15 different instruments and set about repairing barrel organs. With the assistance of his father, he built his own organ and became organist at the Church of St Mary the Virgin, Masham, in 1832. He won first prize in the Huddersfield Glee Club in 1840. In 1852, he established a music business and became organist of St. John's Church at Bradford. Later, he took the organ at Horton Chapel, was conductor of Bradford Choral Union, and chorusmaster of Bradford Festivals. His works include two oratorios (Deliverance of Israel from Babylon and Isaiah); two cantatas (The Year and The Praise of Music); the 103d Psalm for solo, choir and orchestra; sacred music, glees; part-songs; and songs.

Jackson died suddenly in April 1866 and was buried in Undercliffe Cemetery in Bradford. His son, also named William, became an organist and composer too.
