= Djong Victorin Yu =

South Korean conductor and composer (born 1957)

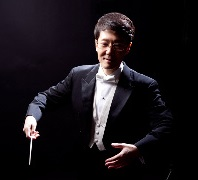
- Djong Victorin Yu in 2013
- Born: June 2, 1957 (age 69); Seoul, South Korea
- Education: University of Pennsylvania
- Occupations: Conductor, Composer
- Years active: 1983–present

Korean name
- Hangul: 유종
- Hanja: 兪淙
- RR: Yu Jong
- MR: Yu Chong
- Website: www.djongvictorinyu.com

Djong Victorin Yu (Korean: 유종; born June 2, 1957 in Seoul) is a South Korean conductor and composer. Yu has made numerous CDs in London with the Philharmonia Orchestra. His first CD with the Philharmonia Orchestra (titled Russian Masterpieces) earned the following review: “His Mussorgsky Pictures reminds me of the young Karajan of the 1950s . . . stunning . . . marvellous.”

== Link ==
- Djong Victorin Yu Official Website
