= Frederic Hymen Cowen =

English composer, conductor and pianist (1852–1935)

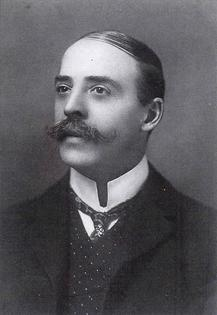
Frederic Hymen Cowen (1852-1935)

Sir Frederic Hymen Cowen (29 January 1852 – 6 October 1935), was an English composer, conductor and pianist.

== Early years and musical education ==
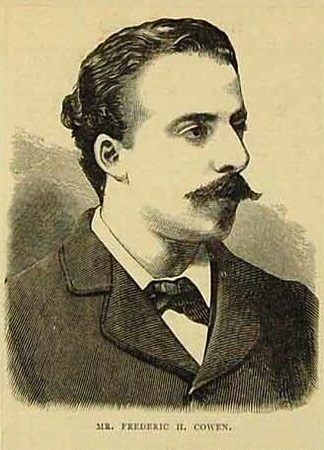
Frederic Hymen Cowen (1852-1935) in 1877

Cowen was born Hymen Frederick Cohen at 90 Duke Street, Kingston, Jamaica, the fifth and last child of Frederick Augustus Cohen and Emily Cohen née Davis. His siblings were Elizabeth Rose Cohen (b. 1843); actress, Henrietta Sophia Cohen (b. 1845); painter, Lionel Jonas Cohen (b. 1847), and Emma Magnay Cohen (b. 1849).

At the age of four years Frederic was brought to England, where his father became treasurer to the opera at Her Majesty's Opera, now Her Majesty's Theatre, and private secretary to William Humble Ward, 11th Lord Ward (1817–1885). The family initially lived at 11 Warwick Crescent, London, in the area known as Little Venice. His first teacher was Henry Russell, and his first published composition, Minna-waltz, appeared when he was only six years old. He produced his first published operetta, Garibaldi, at the age of eight. With the help of the Earl of Dudley, he studied the piano with Julius Benedict, and composition with John Goss.

His first public appearance as a pianist was as an accompanist in one of his own early songs sung by Mrs Drayton at a concert in Brighton in the early 1860s. His first genuine public recital was given on 17 December 1863 at the Bijou Theatre of the old Her Majesty's Opera House, and in the following year he performed Mendelssohn's Piano Concerto in D minor at a concert given at Dudley House, Park Lane, the London home of the Earl of Dudley. At the same venue a year later he premiered his Pianoforte Trio in A major with Joseph Joachim playing the violin part.

By Autumn 1865, it was the judgment of his instructors, Julius Benedict and John Goss, that they could do little more to further his musical education and recommended that he study in Germany. By coincidence the second competition for the Mendelssohn Scholarship was due to be held that gave its winner three years of tuition at the Leipzig Conservatorium. Cowen attended the examination and won the prize, but his parents intervened, as they were not prepared to give up control of him, as stipulated by the terms of the prize. Instead, they agreed to send him to the same institution, but as an independent student. Charles Swinnerton Heap was awarded the prize in his place. At Leipzig, overseen by Ernst Friedrich Eduard Richter, Cowen studied under Moritz Hauptmann (harmony and counterpoint), Ignaz Moscheles (piano), Carl Reinecke (composition) and Ferdinand David (ensemble work). He also came into contact with Salomon Jadassohn and Ernst Wenzel, and took some private piano lessons with Louis Plaidy. Cowen's fellow students and companions in Leipzig included Swinnerton Heap, Johan Svendsen, Oscar Beringer and Stephen Adams.

In 1887, shortly after conducting his Scandinavian Symphony, he was taken ill with Scarlet fever and recovered at the specialist convalescent home of Mary Wardell in Stanmore.

== Career ==
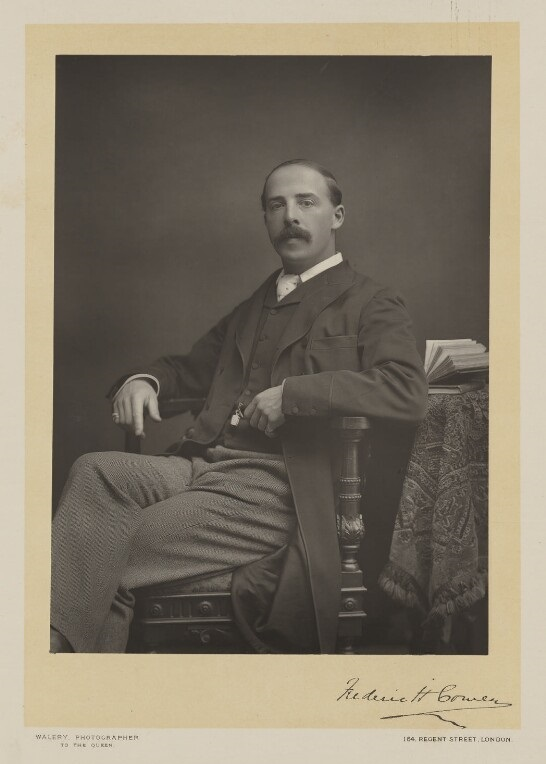
Frederic Hymen Cowen (1852-1935) in 1890

Returning home on the outbreak of the Austro-Prussian War, he appeared as a composer for the orchestra in an Overture in D minor played at Alfred Mellon's Promenade Concerts at Covent Garden on 8 September 1866. In the following autumn he went to Berlin, where he studied composition under Friedrich Kiel and Carl Taubert, and took piano lessons from Carl Tausig, enrolling at the academy created by Julius Stern, known as the Stern'sches Konservatorium. A symphony (his first in C minor) and a piano concerto (in A minor) were given in St. James's Hall on 9 December 1869, and from that moment Cowen began to be recognised as primarily a composer, his talents as a pianist being subordinate, although his public appearances were numerous for some time afterwards.

His cantata, The Rose Maiden, was given at London in 1870, his Second Symphony in F major by the Royal Liverpool Philharmonic Society in 1872, and his first festival work, The Corsair, in 1876 at Birmingham. In that year his opera, Pauline, was given by the Carl Rosa Opera Company with moderate success. His most important work, his Symphony No. 3 in C minor, Scandinavian, which was first performed at St. James's Hall in 1880 and went on to establish itself for a decade as one of the most popular symphonic works in the repertoire, brought him some international recognition. Appearing in 1880, it proved to be the most regularly and widely performed British symphony until the arrival of Elgar's First. In 1884 he conducted five concerts of the Philharmonic Society of London, and in 1888, on the resignation of Arthur Sullivan, became the regular conductor of that society. His employment there came to an abrupt termination in 1892 when he apologised for any shortcomings in the orchestra's performance of Beethoven's Pastoral Symphony before they had rendered it, due to the lack of rehearsal time that he felt he had been given. The directors took umbrage at his remarks and did not renew his contract. In the year of his appointment to the Philharmonic Society, 1888, he went to Melbourne as the conductor of the daily concerts given in connection with the Exhibition there for the unprecedented sum of £5,000. In 1896, Cowen was appointed conductor of the Liverpool Philharmonic Society and of the Hallé Orchestra, succeeding Sir Charles Hallé. He was ousted from the Hallé after three years in favour of Hans Richter. In 1899, he was reappointed conductor of the Philharmonic Society of London. He also conducted the Bradford Festival Choral Society, the Bradford Permanent Orchestra, the Scottish Orchestra (now known as the Royal Scottish National Orchestra) and the Handel Festivals at The Crystal Palace for some years, as well as being a regular attendee at many British music festivals, both as conductor and composer.

Cowen's career, both as composer and conductor, is now unjustly forgotten. He was one of the first British-born professional conductors to have the respect of critics, orchestral musicians, and the public, and he held lengthy tenures with every major British orchestra active before 1900. In addition, his six-month engagement with the Melbourne Exposition made him the most highly-paid conductor of his time. Although he regarded himself primarily as a symphonist, he was most successful in lighter orchestral pieces when treating fantastic or fairy subjects, where his gifts for graceful melody and colourful orchestration were shown to best advantage. Whether in his cantatas for female voices, Sleeping Beauty and The Water Lily, or his imaginative concert overture The Butterfly's Ball (1901), he succeeded in finding graceful expression for poetic ideas. The dance music movements in his orchestral suites were refined, original, and well-orchestrated. Much of his more serious music was commendable rather than inspired and seldom successful in portraying deep emotion. Indeed, his choral works, written for the numerous musical festivals around Victorian and Edwardian Britain, typify the public taste of his time. Of his 300 or so songs, they encompass everything from the popular ballad to the high art song, the latter of which led him to be described as the 'English Schubert' in 1898.

Cowen received honorary doctorates from Cambridge and Edinburgh in 1900 and 1910 respectively, and was knighted at St. James's Palace on 6 July 1911. Cowen married Frederica Gwendoline Richardson at St. Marylebone Registry Office, London, 23 June 1908. She was 30 years his junior and they had no issue. He died on 6 October 1935 and was buried at the Jewish Cemetery, Golders Green. His wife died at Hove, Sussex, in 1971.

== Autobiography ==
Cowen, Sir Frederic H. My Art and My Friends. London: Edward Arnold, 1913.

Cowen's autobiography details his conducting and compositional career, and experiences with musical colleagues and ensembles. 314 pages, with frontispiece photographic portrait, and an index.

== Works ==
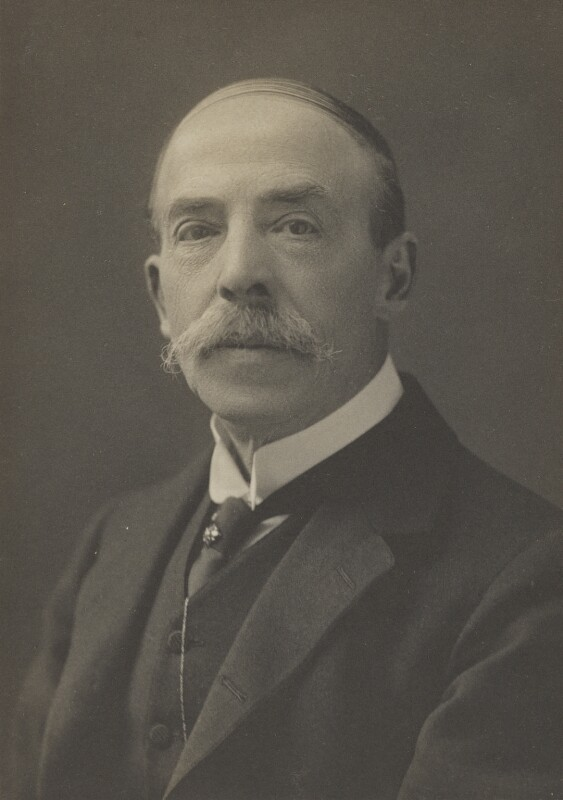
Frederic Hymen Cowen (1852-1935) circa 1915

=== Opera and operetta ===
- 1860 - Garibaldi, operetta (Maida Hill, London, 4 February 1860)
- 1874 - One Too Many, comedietta (St George's Hall, London, 24 June 1874)
- 1876 - Pauline, opera (Lyceum Theatre, London, 22 November 1876)
- 1890 - Thorgrim, opera (Drury Lane Theatre, London, 22 April 1890)
- 1893 - Signa, opera (in 3 Acts, Teatro dal Verme, Milan, 12 November 1893 and later reduced to 2 Acts, Covent Garden Theatre, London, 30 June 1894)
- 1895 - Harold or the Norman Conquest, opera (Covent Garden Theatre, London, 8 June 1895)
- 1918 - The Spirit of Carnival, operetta (unfinished)
- 1921 - Comedy-Opera, comedy opera (unperformed)

=== Incidental music ===
- 1871 - The Maid of Orleans (Brighton Festival, February 1871)
- 1922 - The Enchanted Cottage (Duke of York's Theatre, London, 1922)

=== Other stage works ===
- 1917 - Monica's Blue Boy, pantomime (New Theatre, London, 1918)
- 1917 - Cupid's Conspiracy, comedy ballet (Coliseum Theatre, London, 31 December 1917)

=== Orchestral ===
- 1866 - Overture in D minor (Covent Garden Theatre, London, 8 September 1866)
- 1869 - Symphony No. 1 in C minor (St James's Hall, London, 9 December 1869)
- 1872 - Festival Overture (Norwich Festival, 17 September 1872)
- 1872 - Symphony No. 2 in F (Philharmonic Hall, Liverpool, 8 October 1872)
- 1880 - The Language of Flowers, [first] suite de ballet (St James's Hall, London, 27 November 1880)
- 1880 - Symphony No. 3 in C minor, Scandinavian (St James's Hall, London, 18 December 1880)
- 1881 - Sinfonietta in A major (St James's Hall, London, 12 May 1881)
- 1881 - Niagara, characteristic overture in C major (Crystal Palace, London, 22 October 1881)
- 1883 - In the Olden Time, suite in D for strings (Crystal Palace, London, 17 March 1883)
- 1883 - Barbaric March (Albert Hall, London, 1883)
- 1883 - Deux Morceaux: Melodie and A l'espagne (Crystal Palace, London, 10 November 1883)
- 1884 - Symphony No. 4 in B flat minor, The Welsh (St James's Hall, London, 28 May 1884)
- 1886 - March (Folkestone Exhibition, Folkestone, May 1886)
- 1886 - Overture in D (Liverpool Exhibition, Liverpool, 11 May 1886)
- 1887 - Symphony No. 5 in F (Guildhall, Cambridge, 9 June 1887)
- 1896 - In Fairyland, suite de ballet (St James's Hall, London, 6 May 1896)
- 1896 - Four English Dances in the Olden Style (St James's Hall, London, 11 May 1896)
- 1897 - Symphony No. 6 in E, Idyllic (St James's Hall, London, 31 May 1897)
- 1901 - The Butterfly's Ball, concert overture (Queen's Hall, London, 2 March 1901)
- 1901 - A Phantasy of Life and Love, orchestral poem (Three Choirs Festival, Gloucester, 11 September 1901)
- 1902 - Coronation March (Queen's Hall, London, 29 March 1902)
- 1903 - Indian Rhapsody (Three Choirs Festival, Hereford, 9 September 1903)
- 1903 - Two Pieces: Childhood and Girlhood for small orchestra
- 1903 - Reverie (Edinburgh, December 1903)
- 1905 - A Suite of Old English Dances (City Hall, Candleriggs, Glasgow, 27 January 1906)
- 1912 - The Months, twelve sketches
- 1914 - The Language of Flowers, second suite de ballet (Queen's Hall, London, 19 September 1914)
- 1934 - The Magic Goblet – The Luck of Edenhall (BBC Studio, London, 9 June 1934)
- 1934 - Miniature Variations (Humoresque) (BBC Studio, London, 20 April 1935)

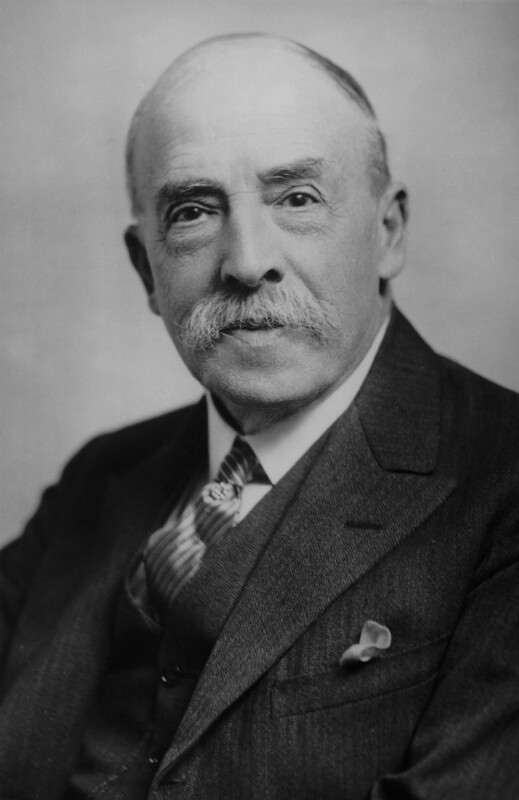
Frederic Hymen Cowen (1852-1935) circa 1925

=== Instrumental soloist and orchestra ===
- 1869 - Piano Concerto in A minor (St James's Hall, London, 9 December 1869)
- 1897 - Concertstück, for piano and orchestra (Queen's Hall, London, 28 June 1900)

=== Oratorio and cantata ===
- 1870 - The Rose Maiden, cantata (St James's Hall, London, November 1870)
- 1876 - The Corsair, dramatic cantata (Birmingham Festival, 29 August 1876)
- 1878 - The Deluge, oratorio (Brighton Festival, 28 February 1878)
- 1881 - St. Ursula, sacred cantata (Norwich Festival, 13 October 1881)
- 1885 - Sleeping Beauty, cantata (Birmingham Festival, 25 August 1885)
- 1887 - Ruth, dramatic oratorio (Three Choirs Festival, Worcester, 8 September 1887)
- 1889 - St John's Eve, cantata (Crystal Palace, London, 14 December 1889)
- 1893 - The Water-Lily, cantata (Norwich Festival, 6 October 1893)
- 1895 - The Transfiguration, church cantata (Three Choirs Festival, Gloucester, 15 September 1895)
- 1898 - Ode to the Passions, cantata (Leeds Festival, 8 October 1898)
- 1900 - Jephthah, oratorio (unfinished)
- 1904 - John Gilpin, cantata (Cardiff Festival, 23 September 1904)
- 1910 - The Veil, ethical cantata (Cardiff Festival, 20 September 1910)

=== Other choral ===
- 1888 - A Song of Thanksgiving, commemoration ode for chorus and orchestra (Melbourne Centennial Exhibition, Melbourne, Australia, 1 August 1888)
- 1890 - In Memoriam Carl Rosa, ode for triple-quartet, chorus and orchestra (Liverpool, November 1890)
- 1891 - The Fairies' Spring, for female voices and piano
- 1893 - Village Scenes, for female voices and piano
- 1893 - Summer on the River, for female voices and piano
- 1893 - The Promise of Life, arrangement of song for tenor soloist, male chorus and piano
- 1894 - Christmas Scenes, for female voices and piano
- 1895 - The Rose of Life, for female voices and piano
- 1896 - A Daughter of the Sea, for female voices and piano
- 1897 - All Hail the Glorious Reign, commemoration ode for chorus and orchestra (Earl's Court, London, 24 May 1897)
- 1902 - Coronation Ode, ode for soprano, chorus and orchestra (Norwich Festival, 22 October 1902)
- 1907 - He Giveth His Belovèd Sleep for contralto, chorus and orchestra (Cardiff Festival, 27 September 1907)
- 1914 - What shall we dance?, arrangement of part-song for chorus and orchestra

=== Vocal soloist and orchestra ===
- 1897 - The Dream of Endymion, scena for tenor and orchestra (Queen's Hall, London, 17 June 1897)

=== Chamber music ===
- 1865 - Piano Trio No. 1 in A major (Dudley House, Park Lane, London, 22 June 1865)
- 1868 - Piano Trio No. 2 in A minor
- 1866 - String Quartet in C minor (Conservatorium, Leipzig, 14 January 1866)

=== Works for solo piano ===
- 1863 - Lied ohne worte (Her Majesty's Theatre, London, 17 December 1863)
- 1864 - Sonata
- 1912 - The Months, Twelve Sketches

=== Songs ===
The following are among over 300 songs written by Cowen:

- Border Ballad
- I will give you Rest
- Buttercups and Daisies
- When the Worlds is Fair
- The Voice of the Father
- The Swallows
- Promise of Life
- The Chimney Corner
- The Reaper and the Flowers
- The Better Land
- Spinning
- It was a Dream

At least two songs, It was a Dream and Almost, had lyrics by R. E. Francillon.

== Scores and manuscripts ==
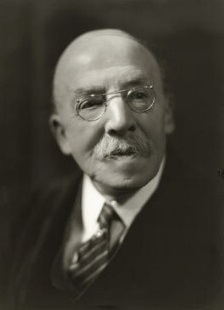
Frederic Hymen Cowen (1852-1935) circa 1935

Most of Cowen's works were published in one form or another although several have been lost.

The following major scores were published:

- Novello, Ewer & Co., London, issued full orchestral scores of Symphony No.4, Sleeping Beauty, Ruth, Symphony No.5, Four English Dances in the Olden Style, The Butterfly's Ball, the Coronation March, the Two Pieces, Reverie, John Gilpin and A Suite of Old English Dances together with vocal scores of Sleeping Beauty, Ruth, A Song of Thanksgiving, St John's Eve, Thorgrim, The Water-Lily, Village Scenes, Summer on the River, Christmas Scenes, The Rose of Life, A Daughter of the Sea, All Hail the Glorious Reign, The Dream of Endymion, Ode to the Passions, the Coronation Ode, John Gilpin, He Giveth His Beloved Sleep, The Veil and What shall we dance?, together with several piano arrangements including The Months and a piano duet arrangement of Symphony No.4.
- Metzler & Co., London, issued full orchestral scores of the first The Language of Flowers suite, In Fairyland and the second The Language of Flowers suite together with the vocal score of Saint Ursula and a piano selection from Monica's Blue Boy; Boosey & Co., London, issued the full orchestral score of the Indian Rhapsody, together with vocal scores of Garibaldi, The Rose Maiden, The Corsair, Pauline, The Promise of Life and The Transfiguration.
- Breitkopf and Härtel, Leipzig, issued the full orchestral score of Symphony No.6.
- Joseph Williams, London, issued full orchestral scores of A Phantasy of Life and Love and the Concertstück together with the vocal score of Harold, a selection from One Too Many and a piano suite from Cupid's Conspiracy.
- E. Ascherberg & Co., London, issued the vocal score of Signa.
- Albert J. Gutmann, Vienna, issued the full scores of Symphony No.3 and Deux Morceaux together with a piano duet arrangement of Symphony No.3.
- Robert Cocks & Co., London, issued the vocal score of The Fairies Spring.

Many of Cowen's unpublished orchestral manuscripts, together with the relevant orchestral performing material, are presumed lost including the Piano Concerto, the first two symphonies, the 1866 Overture, the Festival Overture, The Maid of Orleans, One Too Many, The Corsair, The Deluge, Saint Ursula, Pauline, the Sinfonietta, Niagara, In the Olden Time, the Barbaric March, the 1886 March, the 1886 Overture, A Song of Thanksgiving, St John's Eve, Thorgrim, the ode In Memoriam Carl Rosa, Signa, Harold, The Transfiguration, Jephthah and the complete version of The Magic Goblet - The Luck of Edenhall.

Several significant manuscripts have, however, survived:

- The full orchestral score of The Water-Lily is held by The British Library, London (Add.Ms 50767) together with the Comedy-Opera (Add.Ms 52426).
- The full orchestral scores of Four English Dances in the Olden Style, The Dream of Endymion, All hail the glorious reign, Ode to the Passions, The Butterfly’s Ball, the Coronation Ode, the Coronation March, John Gilpin, A Suite of Old English Dances, He Giveth His Beloved Sleep, The Veil, The Months and What shall we dance? are held by the Library of the Royal College of Music, London (Add.Mss 5058a-p) together with the full orchestral score of the Miniature Variations (Humoreque) (Add.Ms 9015) and the vocal score of the ode In Memoriam Carl Rosa (Add.Ms 7425).
- The full orchestral scores of The Enchanted Cottage (incomplete) and The Magic Goblet - The Luck of Edenhall (incomplete), together with thirteen numbers either in vocal or piano score from The Spirit of Carnival and a short score, drafts and sketches for the Miniature Variations (Humoresque) (all Mss Mus.b.45) are held by the Bodleian Library, Oxford.
- The full orchestral score of The Rose Maiden is held by the Thomas Fisher Rare Book Library, University of Toronto, Ontario, Canada (Music Mss 0028).
