= British Concerts =

The "British Concerts" were a series of concerts given in 1823, at the Argyll Rooms in London.

== History ==
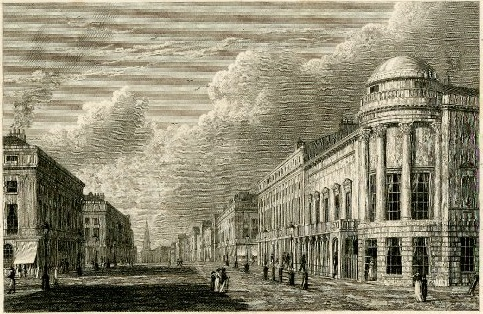
Regent Street, with the Argyll Rooms on the right, in 1825

When the Vocal Concerts were discontinued at the close of 1822, the British Concerts were established to supply their place, and, according to the prospectus, "to meet the wishes of a numerous class of persons who are anxious to see native talent encouraged". The programmes were to consist "entirely of works of British composers, or of foreigners who have been naturalised and resident in these realms for at least ten years". The managers of the concerts were the following members of the Concentores Society: Thomas Attwood, Henry Bishop, James Elliott (1788-1856), John Goss, William Hawes, William Horsley, John Jolly (1790-1864), William Linley, Thomas Forbes Walmisley and Sir George Smart.

Three concerts were given in 1823, under the immediate patronage of the King, including instrumental chamber music, vocal solos and glees. Among the new works given were string quartets by James Calkin and George Eugene Griffin, a quartet for piano and strings by Griffin, Horsley's "Address to Hope" for double choir, and his glee "The Crier", Linley's glee "Now the blue-fly's gone to bed", Elliott's "A choir of bright beauties", Hawes's "Love, like a bird", and Attwood's "In this fair vale". The instrumental performers were Nicolas Mori, W. Griesbach, H. Smart, and Linley; the chief vocalists were Eliza Salmon, Catherine Stephens, Thomas Vaughan, John Bernard Sale and Thomas Ludford Bellamy.

The concerts took place in the ballroom of the Argyll Rooms, and a list of 200 subscribers was published, but the support given to the scheme was not enough for the concerts to continue, and the season of 1823 was the first and last.
