= Regent's Harmonic Institution =

Regent's Harmonic Institution (RHI), also known as Royal Harmonic Institution, Welsh and Hawes at the Royal Harmonic Institution, and Welsh and Hawes, was a 19th-century English firm of music publishers as a well as a purveyor of music instruments. The firm was notably the first press to publish Ludwig van Beethoven's Hammerklavier in an edition authorized by the composer in September 1819.

== History ==
Founded as Regent's Harmonic Institution in London in 1818, the organization was a joint-stock company created for the express purpose of raising funds to finance the reconstruction of the Argyll Rooms, the home of the Royal Philharmonic Society (RPS). Spearheaded by Regent Street architect John Nash and the board of the RPS, the firm was made up of several composer members who invested money into the organization as well as agreeing to publish their music through the firm. Investors in this organization recouped their money through the sale of music and music instruments, such as harps and pianos, sold by the firm. In 1820 the firm was renamed the Royal Harmonic Institution.

Several successful 19th century English composers were investing members of the RHI and published their music through the RHI; including Thomas Attwood, William Beale, James Calkin, Johann Baptist Cramer, George Eugene Griffin, William Hawes, Charles Neate, Thomas Augustus Rawlings, Ferdinand Ries (who was German), George Thomas Smart, Thomas Forbes Walmisley, Thomas Welsh, and Samuel Wesley. Eventually internal struggles led many of the investing composers as well as the RPS to divest of their interests in the firm, at which point Thomas Welsh and William Hawes became the controlling members of the organization and it was renamed Welsh and Hawes at the Royal Harmonic Institution or simply Welsh and Hawes in September 1825. The firm was in operation until May 1833.

The RHI mainly published art songs, glees, arrangements of opera arias or other opera excerpts, and works for the piano. The most well known composition published by the firm was the first publication of Ludwig van Beethoven's Hammerklavier in September 1819; a publication authorized by the composer.
