= Samuel Harrison (singer) =

English singer

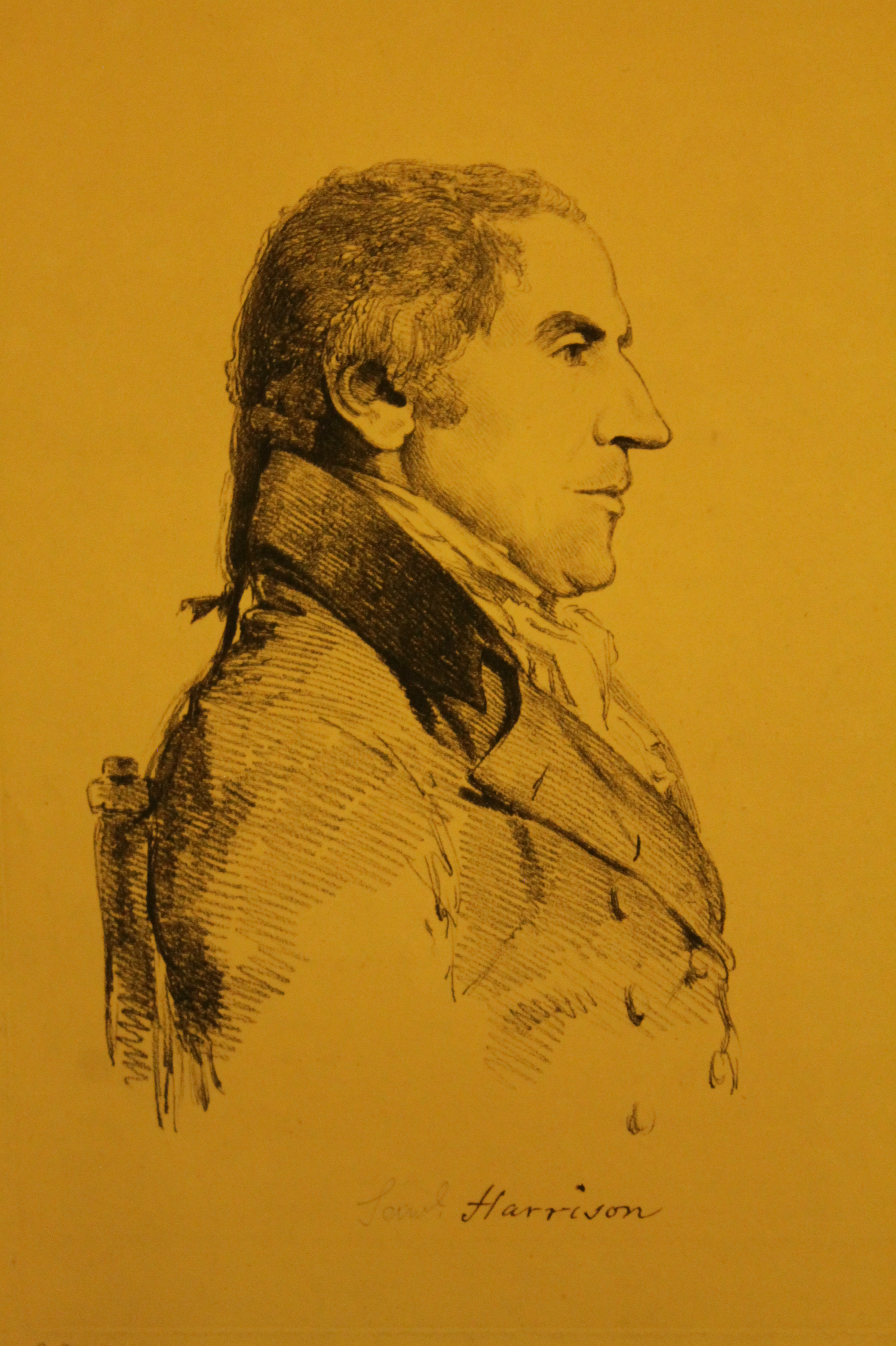
Samuel Harrison etched by William Daniell

Samuel Harrison (8 September 1760 – 25 June 1812) was an English singer. A tenor, he sang in notable concerts of the day, including the Concerts of Antient Music and the Three Choirs Festival.

== Early life ==
Harrison was born in Belper, Derbyshire, on 8 September 1760. Burton, a bass singer, was his earliest instructor. Harrison was trained as a boy soprano to sing solos at the Concerts of Antient Music and at the Society of Sacred Music in 1776. His voice did not break until he was eighteen; he then cultivated his tenor voice with the utmost care. George III, hearing him at one of the Queen's musical parties, had him engaged for the Handel Commemoration of 1784, where he sang "Rend' il sereno al ciglio" from Sosarme, and the opening recitative and air from Messiah; he thus sprang into the notice of musicians and fashionable people.

== Early career, and marriage ==
He made his first appearance at the Three Choirs Festival as principal tenor in 1781, at Gloucester; from 1786 until 1808 he sang at each of the Hereford meetings, and from 1801 till 1808 was a principal also at Gloucester and Worcester. The meeting of 1811 was managed by Harrison with others. In London he was a member of the Noblemen and Gentlemen's Catch Club, and he performed at the Professional Concerts from about 1783, and at the Society of Sacred Music from 1785 until 1790, when Michael Kelly succeeded him. In conjunction with John Ashley, Harrison conducted, and sang in, oratorios at Covent Garden Theatre during Lent of 1791; he sang in the Drury Lane oratorios in 1794, and at the concerts during Lent at the King's Theatre in 1795.

Harrison married, on 6 December 1790, Miss Cantelo. Before the marriage her musical career ran in parallel lines with his; she was a favourite at the Concerts of Antient Music and at the Three Choirs Festivals, and earned praise for her performance at the Handel Commemoration of 1784.

== The Vocal Concerts, and later ==
Harrison was principal tenor at the Concerts of Antient Music from 1785 until 1791, when he withdrew, and with Charles Knyvett the elder, established the Vocal Concerts. The first was given on 11 February 1792 at Willis's Rooms, and they continued until 1794, when they had ceased to attract; Harrison and the chief promoters of the enterprise then returned to the Antient Concerts. In 1801 the Vocal Concerts were revived on a larger scale, with an orchestra, and were very successful until newer musical attractions drew the public away.

Harrison repeated some of his most popular performances at his benefit concert on 8 May 1812, which was his last appearance in public. He died on the following 25 June at his home in Percy Street in London, and was buried at St Pancras Old Church. His widow died in 1831.

== His voice ==
Harrison's voice was described in The Harmonicon in 1830: "In tone it was at once the weakest and the most pure and equal that has, perhaps, ever been heard in England – its very existence was a proof of how far determination and perseverance can triumph over natural deficiencies.... Voice (we speak of the natural organ) he had really little; it was the high polish, the minute and exquisite finish of his style, that made the charm...."
