= Charles Knyvett =

English singer and organist

Charles Knyvett (11 February 1752 – 19 January 1822) was an English singer and organist. He established in 1791 in London the Vocal Concerts, a series of subscription concerts.

== Life ==
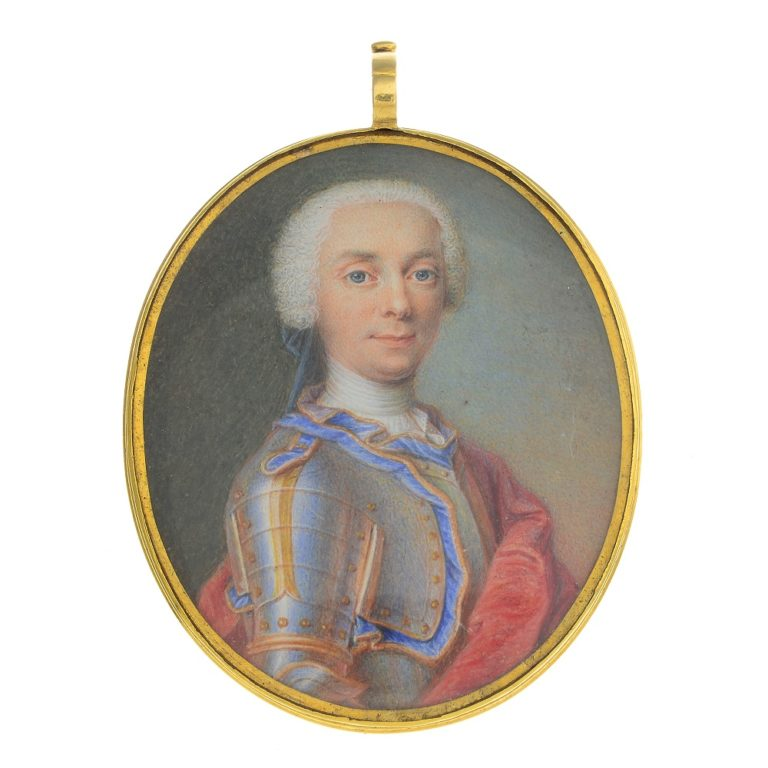
Georgian miniature portrait of Charles Knyvett (1710–1782), his father

He was born in Westminster, son of Charles Knyvett and his wife Jane née Jordan; he was descended from the family of Knyvet or Knyvett of Fundenhall, Norfolk, descendants of Sir William Knyvett (d. 1515). He was educated at Westminster School, and was a chorister at Westminster Abbey, under Benjamin Cooke.

He was appointed in 1770 joint organist, with William Smethergell, of All Hallows-by-the-Tower. Possessing a fine alto voice, he was one of the chief singers at the Handel Commemoration of 1784, and he was appointed Gentleman of the Chapel Royal in 1786.

In 1789, in partnership with Samuel Harrison, he directed a series of oratorio performances at Covent Garden. In 1791, again in partnership with Harrison, and with the additional assistance of his brother William, he established at Willis's Rooms the Vocal Concerts, which were successfully carried on for three years. He was appointed in 1796 organist of the Chapel Royal. In 1801, with the co-operation of his brother William, his son Charles, Thomas Greatorex and James Bartleman, he revived the Vocal Concerts at the Hanover Square Rooms, but in the following year he withdrew from the management. In 1808 he resigned his post of Gentleman of the Chapel Royal, and was succeeded by his son Charles.

Knyvett was a member of the Royal Society of Musicians from 1778. He was for many years secretary to the Noblemen and Gentlemen's Catch Club, whose meetings were held at the Thatched House Tavern, St James's Street, and he was a frequent visitor at the meetings of the Madrigal Society. For one season he replaced Joah Bates as conductor at the Concerts of Antient Music. On 16 January 1779 he became a Freemason being initiated along with 5 other musicians in Somerset House Lodge No.2.

Knyvett died in Blandford Street, Pall Mall, on 19 January 1822. William Thomas Parke, in Musical Memoirs (ii, 236) wrote that he considered Knyvett "one of the best singers of glees", and "perhaps the best catch singer in England".

== Publications ==
He published in 1815 Six Airs harmonised for three and four voices; and also edited, in 1800, A Collection of favourite Glees, Catches, and Rounds presented by the Candidates for the Premiums given by the Prince of Wales in the year 1800.

== Personal life ==
He married in 1772 Rose Alleway, and they had three sons: Charles (1773–1852), a musician, from 1802 organist of St George's Hanover Square Church; William, a singer and composer; and Henry (1774–1843), who became an army officer.
