= Charles Neate (musician) =

British pianist and composer (1784–1877)

- Born: March 28, 1784
- Died: March 30, 1877 (aged 93)

Charles Neate (28 March 1784 – 30 March 1877) was a British pianist and composer, and a founder member of the Royal Philharmonic Society. From 1815 to 1816 he lived in Vienna and became a friend of Ludwig van Beethoven. He publicised the music of Beethoven and other composers of the time at the Philharmonic Society.

== Early life ==
Neate was born in London, and studied the piano with John Field and composition with Joseph Wölfl. On 2 March 1806 he was admitted as a member of the Royal Society of Musicians. In 1813 he was one of the original members of the Royal Philharmonic Society; he became a director of the Society, and he sometimes performed or conducted there.

== In Vienna ==
From 1815 he lived abroad for two years. For a few months he lived in Munich, studying counterpoint with Peter Winter. In May 1815 he visited Vienna, and stayed there until February 1816. A Viennese merchant, Johann Hering, who was also a musician, introduced him to Beethoven. Beethoven, unable to give lessons to Neate, recommended him to Emanuel Aloys Förster, but regularly supervised Neate's musical studies; they met in Baden bei Wien, where Beethoven stayed during the summer of 1815.

== Later career ==
Returning to London, Neate brought with him three overtures by Beethoven to play at the Philharmonic Society: the overtures to The Ruins of Athens op. 113 and King Stephen op. 117, and Zur Namensfeier op. 115; however these were not well received by the Society. He brought back other works which Beethoven hoped could be published in England. Correspondence between Neate and Beethoven continued, about publication of works and performance of works by the Philharmonic Society. Neate, George Thomas Smart and Beethoven's pupil Ferdinand Ries (who lived in London at this period) did much to publicise Beethoven's music in London.

In 1818 Neate was a founding member of the Regent’s Harmonic Institution; a music publishing firm established with the intent of raising funds for the Royal Philharmonic Society and its restoration of the Argyll Rooms.

In December 1824 Neate wrote to Beethoven, on behalf of the Philharmonic Society, inviting him to come to London:

The Philharmonic Society is willing to pay you three hundred guineas for your visit, expecting that you will yourself conduct the performances of your works, of which one must be heard in every concert. It is also expected that you will write a symphony and a concerto, to be performed during your visit, which you may regard afterwards as your property.... I profit from this occasion to tell you that I am your sincere friend, and that you will be surrounded here by a great many persons who will improve every opportunity to show their esteem and admiration of the great Beethoven, whose fame shines more than ever in this country.

Beethoven seriously considered the offer, but a visit to England did not take place.

Neate became well known as a pianist and teacher. He was the first to play in England, at the Philharmonic Society's concerts, Beethoven's Piano Concertos No. 3 and No. 5.

He died in Brighton in 1877, after many years in retirement.

== Compositions ==
As a composer Neate wrote mainly for the piano.

His Serenade for two performers on one pianoforte, op. 15, was reviewed in 1827: "This is composed in the style that belongs to the Serenade: it is flowing, easy and unostentatious... But... we cannot avoid saying, that the subject-matter is decidedly unequal to the extent over which it has spread...."

His Capriccio for the Pianoforte, on a German Air was reviewed in 1828: "Mr. Neate is one of those excellent musicians whose sterling worth is not to be injured, nor his judgement misled by the commands of fashion. He is judicious in yielding enough to the present taste, not to be behind-hand in the refinements effected by the progression of art, but he selects those improvements that suit well with his own elegant and expressive style; all this is exemplified in his capriccio."

His Second Grand Trio, for Pianoforte, Violin and Violoncello, op. 22, was reviewed in 1831: "This was performed by Mr. Neate at one of his concerts.... The first movement is the least striking of the whole.... The Andante... will gain the suffrages of all who possess real taste.... The Minuet and Trio have both a great deal of that very rare commodity, originality, and abound in spirit well kept up.... The finale, differing in style from the other parts of the Trio, derives much of its effect from contrast.... This work requires a superior pianist to execute it, but it exhibits none of those freaks which only the contriver of them can play...."

== Personality ==
A writer in the magazine The Musical World gives a particular impression of the musician: "I recall... Charles Neate, one of the best informed but most egotistical of pianists, whose admiration for, and acquaintance with, Beethoven made his society at all times enjoyable.... Neate introduced into England many celebrated works of Beethoven, Weber and Hummel – and he did not forget, when you were in his society, to let you know it."
