= Regent Square =

Regent Square may refer to:

== Places ==
- Regent Square (London), a public square and street in the borough of Camden, London
- Regent Square (Pittsburgh), a neighbourhood in Pittsburgh, Pennsylvania

== Other ==
- Regent Square (hymn tune), a hymn tune written by Henry Smart
