= Mary Shaw (contralto) =

British opera singer

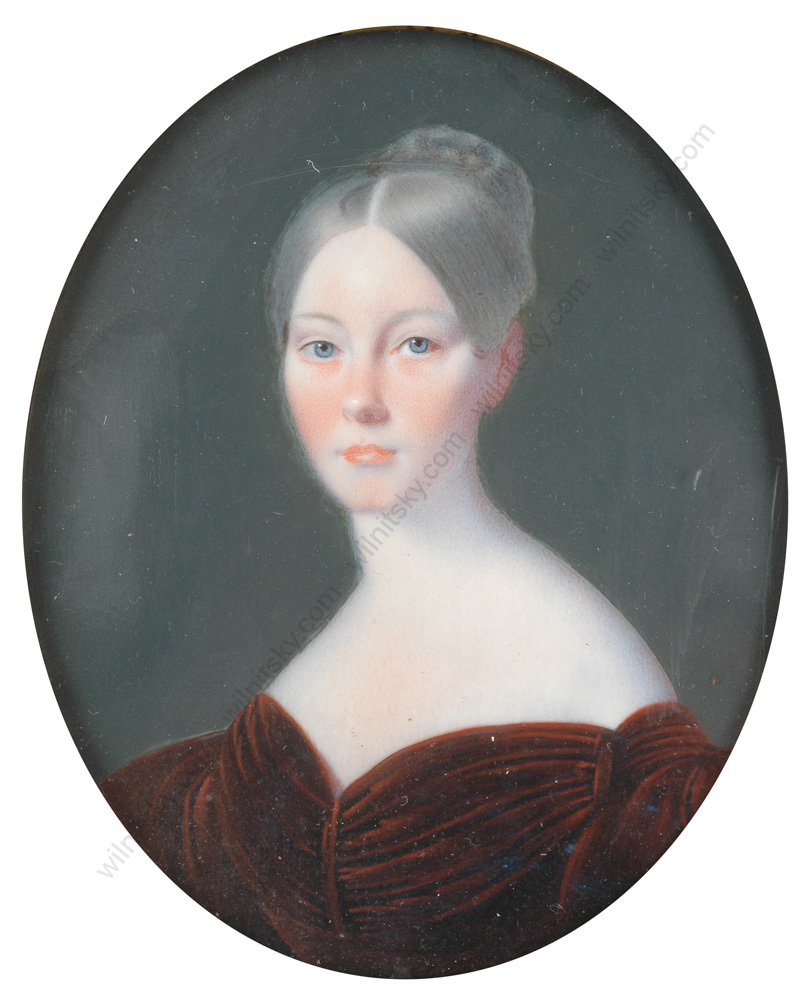
- miniature portrait on ivory, 20-year-old Mary Shaw Postans
- Born: Mary Postans; 1814; Kent, England
- Died: 9 September 1876 (aged 61–62); Hadleigh Hall, Suffolk, England
- Other names: Mary Shaw Postans
- Education: Royal Academy of Music
- Occupation: classical contralto
- Known for: concerts and opera in England and Italy
- Parents: Thomas—the Esq. of Tewkesbury (father); Agathe Postans (mother)

Mary Shaw (1814 – 9 September 1876) was an English classical contralto who had an active international career in concerts and operas during the 1830s and 1840s. She is best remembered today for creating the role of Cuniza in the world premiere of Giuseppe Verdi's first opera Oberto at La Scala in 1839.

== Life and career ==
Born Mary Postans in Kent, daughter of Thomas—the Esq. of Tewkesbury—and Agathe Postans and sister-in-law of the writer Marianne Postans, author of "Western India", Shaw entered the Royal Academy of Music in London in 1828. She studied there through 1831 and was a singing pupil of George Smart at the school. She made her professional singing debut in 1834 as a concert singer, and was highly active as a concert and oratorio singer in her native country for the next five years. In 1835 she married the painter Alfred Shaw and thereafter appeared under the name Mary Shaw. That same year she performed at the Concerts of Ancient Music in London and at the York Festival. In 1836 she sang at the festivals in Norwich and Liverpool, the latter in the English premiere of Felix Mendelssohn's oratorio St. Paul on 3 October 1836. In 1837 she appeared in several concerts in London sponsored by the Royal Philharmonic Society and the Sacred Harmonic Society. She also performed at the Birmingham Triennial Music Festival. In 1838–39 she appeared as a soloist with the Leipzig Gewandhaus Orchestra in 12 concerts under Mendelssohn's baton at the Gewandhaus in Leipzig, Germany.

Shaw began her opera career in Italy in 1839, making her first stage appearance at the Teatro Nuovo di Novara as Arsace in Gioachino Rossini's Semiramide. She also sang the role Malcolm Groeme in Rossini's La donna del lago at that house later that year. On 17 November 1839 she made her debut at La Scala as Cuniza in the world premiere of Giuseppe Verdi's first opera Oberto. She then returned to her native country where she was the first to report to England the excellence of Verdi, and managed to draw musicologist and critic Henry Chorley's interest in the new Italian composer. She was active at the Royal Opera House and the Theatre Royal, Drury Lane in London during the early 1840s, singing such roles as Arsace, Fidalma in Domenico Cimarosa's Il matrimonio segreto, and Graeme Malcolm. In 1844 she performed in the world premiere of Julius Benedict's The Brides of Venice at Drury Lane. Her career was cut short later that year when her husband went insane. The strain of the event affected her physically, and she was thereafter unable to sing in tune. After the death of her husband in 1847, she married the lawyer J.F. Robinson. She never performed again after this. She died at Hadleigh Hall in Suffolk in 1876.
