= William Beale =

English composer and baritone

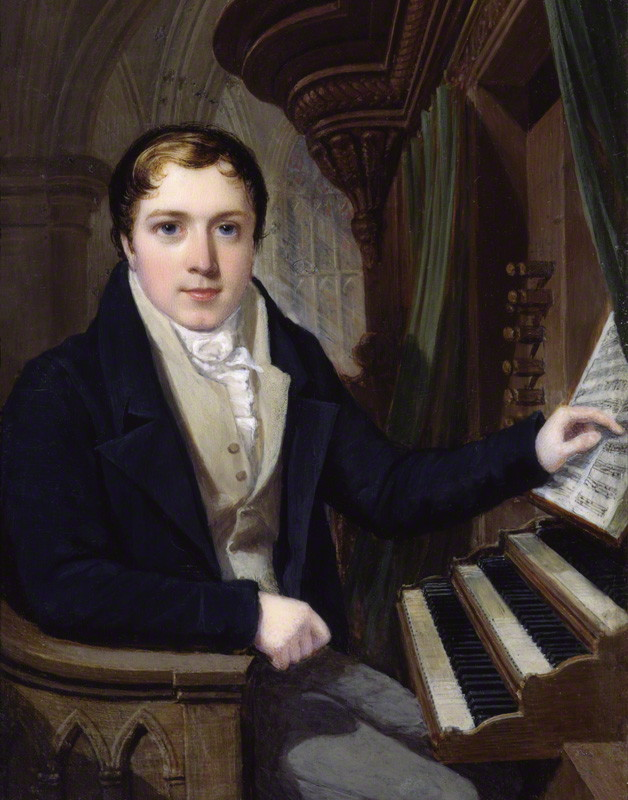
- Portrait (1815), watercolour on ivory, of William Beale (1784–1854) by Charles John Robertson (born 1779?)
- Born: William Beale; 1 January 1784; Landrake, Cornwall, U.K.
- Died: 3 May 1854 (aged 70)
- Occupations: Composer and baritone
- Spouses: Charlotte Elkins; Georgiana Grove
- Relatives: Henry Wolfgang Amadeus Beale

William Beale (1 January 1784 – 3 May 1854) was an English composer and baritone.

== Life and career ==
Beale was born in Landrake, Cornwall. He first served as a chorister at Westminster Abbey under Samuel Arnold until his voice broke. He then served as a midshipman on HMS Révolutionnaire from 1799 to 1801. During this period he was nearly drowned by falling overboard in Cork Harbour.

On leaving the Navy Beale first worked as a letter-sorter for the Post Office, but then quickly turned to music as a career. He became a member of the Royal Society of Musicians in 1811 and in 1813 won the prize cup of the Madrigal Society for his beautiful madrigal, 'Awake, sweet music'. He devoted his career to music and became an organist and composer of glees and madrigals.

Around 1816 he was appointed gentleman of the Chapel Royal, St.James Palace and was living in Westminster. In 1818 he was a founding member of the Regent’s Harmonic Institution; a music publishing firm established with the intent of raising funds for the Royal Philharmonic Society and its restoration of the Argyll Rooms. In 1820, he signed articles of appointment as organist to Trinity College, Cambridge but only stayed at that position for a year before returning to London and becoming organist at Wandsworth Parish Church and then St.John's, Clapham Rise. He continued occasionally to sing in public until later in life, and in 1840 he won a prize at the Adelphi Glee Club for his glee for four voices, 'Harmony'. He also composed the glees Come let us join the roundelay and The Humble Tenant.

Beale was twice married. Firstly to Miss Charlotte Elkins, a daughter of the Groom of the Stole to George IV (Thomas Thynne, 1st Marquess of Bath), and secondly to Miss Georgiana Grove, of Clapham. They had one son, Henry Wolfgang Amadeus Beale, who went on to be a composer as well.
