= Thomas Walmisley =

Thomas Walmisley may refer to:

- Thomas Walmsley (judge) (1537–1612), or Walmisley, English judge and politician
- Thomas Attwood Walmisley (1814–1856), English composer and organist
- Thomas Forbes Walmisley (1783–1866), English composer and organist
