= James Calkin =

James Calkin (19 September 1786 – 18 January 1862) was an English organist, composer and teacher.

== Life ==
Calkin was born in London in 1786, and studied under Thomas Lyon and William Crotch. He was one of the earliest members and directors of the Philharmonic Society in 1823.

He was appointed the first organist of St Peter's Church, Regent Square (completed in 1826), and he held the post for thirty years. He played the cello at concerts of the Philharmonic Society and at the Royal Italian Opera. His life was mostly dedicated to teaching, in which he acquired a considerable reputation.

Calkin died at 12 Oakley Square, Camden Town, London, in 1862.

== Family ==
His son John Baptiste Calkin was a well known organist and composer. His other three sons also became musicians: James Joseph Calkin (1813–1868) was a violinist; Joseph Calkin (1816–1874), stage name Tennielli, was a tenor; George Calkin (1829–1911) was a cellist and organist.

== Works ==
Calkin's compositions include an overture and symphony for orchestra, string quartets, piano music, and sixteen books of organ voluntaries.

A string quartet was performed in 1823 at the British Concerts, played by its dedicatee Nicolas Mori. His madrigal "When Chloris weeps", gained in 1846 a prize from the Western Madrigal Society.
