= Johann Baptist Cramer =

British pianist and composer (1771–1858)

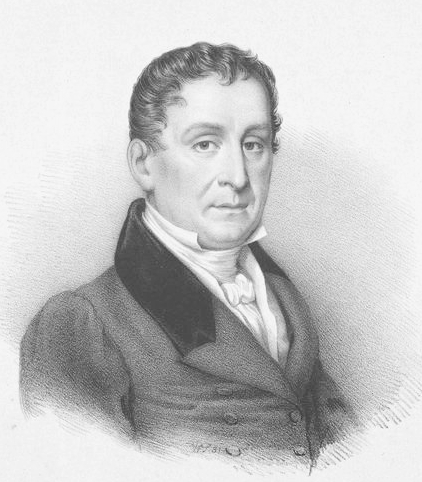
Johann Baptist Cramer "drawn from Life & on Stone" by William Sharp

Johann (sometimes John) Baptist Cramer (24 February 1771 – 16 April 1858) was an English pianist, composer and music publisher of German origin, born in the Holy Roman Empire. He was the son of Wilhelm Cramer, a famous London violinist and conductor, one of a numerous family who were identified with the progress of music during the 18th and 19th centuries.

== Biography ==
Cramer was born in Mannheim and was brought to London as a child, where he worked for most of his musical career, lived most of his life, and died.

From 1782 to 1784, he studied piano under Muzio Clementi and he soon became a renowned professional pianist both in London and on the continent. He enjoyed a worldwide reputation, and was particularly appreciated by Beethoven when he visited Vienna, concertized and competed with him. Both were considered the greatest pianists of their time, Beethoven excelling in interpretative expressiveness, Cramer in pure technical perfection. He was the English publisher of Beethoven's Piano Concerto No. 5 and is credited with giving it its nickname, "The Emperor".

== Legacy ==
Cramer was one of the most renowned piano performers of his day. He met Beethoven in Vienna, initiating a mutually rewarding relationship, while renewing his friendship with Haydn.

After 1800, he was based almost exclusively in England. Following the successful example of his former teacher Clementi, he also became a successful music publisher in London. His many compositions take second place to his pianistic prowess; Beethoven considered him the finest pianist of the day from the standpoint of pure technical perfection.

In 1818 Cramer was a founding member of the Regent's Harmonic Institution, a music publishing firm established with the intent of raising funds for the Royal Philharmonic Society and its restoration of the Argyll Rooms. He later established his own musical instrument manufacturing and music publishing firm, Cramer & Co. in 1824. It was located at 201 Regent Street. He ended his personal involvement in the company at the end of 1833, although it retained his name. He wrote a number of sonatas and other pieces for piano, and other compositions, of which his Études are best known, having appeared in numerous editions. They are still considered standard didactic works for piano students.

His music is generally less dramatic and elegant than Clementi's, much less adventurous than Dussek's and far less Romantic in sentiment than the Chopin forerunner John Field. It is stylistically conservative but replete with the most advanced, idiomatically pianistic passage-work. He wrote some 200 solo piano sonatas, about 50 sonatas for other instruments with piano accompaniment, nine piano concertos, and chamber music.

His brother Franz Cramer was Master of the King's Musick from 1837 until his death in 1848.

== Selected works ==
(→ for a complete survey cf. Thomas B. Milligan, J. B. Cramer (1771–1858): A Thematic Catalogue of His Works, Boydell and Brewer, 1994, 224 p., ISBN 0945193416)

- Sonatas in D major, A major, and G major for piano with violin and violoncello ad. lib, Op. 11 (1796)
- Piano Concerto No. 2 in D minor, Op. 16
- Grande sonate pour le piano-forte, Op. 20 (1809)
- Sonata in A♭ major for piano, Op. 23, No. 1 (1799)
- 2 Sonatas for piano, Op. 27
- Sonata in A♭ major for piano, Op. 46 ("Die Jungfrau von Orleans")
- Piano Concerto No. 5 in C minor, Op. 48
- 84 Études, Opp. 30 and 40
- Keyboard Sonata in A minor ("L'Ultima"), Op. 53 (1812)
- Piano Concerto No. 7 in E major, Op. 56
- Sonata for piano in C major, Op. 57
- Keyboard Sonatas in B♭ major ("Les suivantes No. 2"), Op. 58 (1817) - Allegro spiritoso / Largo sostenuto / Rondo allegretto
- Keyboard Sonata in E minor ("Les Suivante No. 3"), Op. 59 (1817)
- Keyboard Sonata in E major ("Le Retour a Londres"), Op. 62 (1818)
- Keyboard Sonata in D minor, Op. 63 (1821)
- Introduzione ed aria all'inglese for piano, Op. 65
- Piano Quintet in E major ("Amicitia"), Op. 69 (1824) - also in a piano arrangement
- Piano Concerto No. 8 in D minor, Op. 70 (1825)
- Keyboard Sonata in F major ("Il Mezzo"), Op. 74 (1827)
- Short Studies, Op. 100
- Romance et Tarantelle Brilliante (Romance in F major - Tarantelle in A Minor), Op. 101
