= George Eugene Griffin =

English pianist and composer

- Born: January 8, 1781
- Died: May 28, 1863 (aged 82) London, England
- Genres: Classical music
- Occupations: Pianist; Composer
- Instrument: Piano
- Years active: 1797–1830s

George Eugene Griffin (8 January 1781 – 28 May 1863) was an English pianist and composer.

A pupil of Cramer in London, Griffin composed his Piano Concerto No. 1 at the age of 16, which was later published. It quoted from the traditional song Bluebells of Scotland and became a popular success. In 1813 he was one of the 30 founder members of the London Philharmonic Society, and Griffin appeared at Philharmonic concerts both as a composer and performer. One of his three op. 8 string quartets and his Piano Quintet were performed there; a string quartet and a piano quartet were performed in 1823 at the British Concerts.

Other compositions included the choral Ode to Charity (1806), a second Piano Concerto (op. 4, circa 1813), as well as four piano sonatas (opp. 2, 7, 9, and 11), along with shorter pieces and arrangements. From the 1830s Griffin withdrew from composition to concentrate on teaching the piano. He died in London, aged 82.

Griffin should not be confused with the organist and hymn tune composer George Griffin (1816 - c1902).
