= St Peter's Church, Regent Square =

Anglican church in London, England

Coordinates: 51.5270°N 0.1206°W

St Peter's Church was an Anglican church in Regent Square, St Pancras, London. It was built in 1826, and was demolished after being badly damaged in the Second World War. Its location is now part of the London Borough of Camden.

== History ==
Regent Square was laid out after 1809, when development of the Harrison Estate, owned by the brickmaker Thomas Harrison, was passed by an Act of Parliament. The Presbyterian Church (completed in 1827) and St Peter's Church were the first buildings in the square.

St Peter's Church stood on the east side of the square. The architects were William Inwood and his son Henry William Inwood, and was built from 1822 to 1826. Like their best known work, St Pancras New Church, it was designed in Greek Revival style. The west front had an Ionic hexastyle portico the width of the church; above this was an entablature, which continued round the building, and a pediment. There was a circular tower of two stages, with six columns around each stage.

The church was consecrated by the Bishop of London, William Howley, on 8 May 1826. The first incumbent was William Harness, who remained until 1844, and the first organist was James Calkin, who held the post for thirty years.

It was a district chapelry of St Pancras until 1868, when a separate parish was created. The building was badly damaged during the Second World War and was later demolished. The parish was united in 1954 with Holy Cross Church, St Pancras.
