= Holy Cross Church, St Pancras =

Coordinates: 51.5275°N 0.1234°W

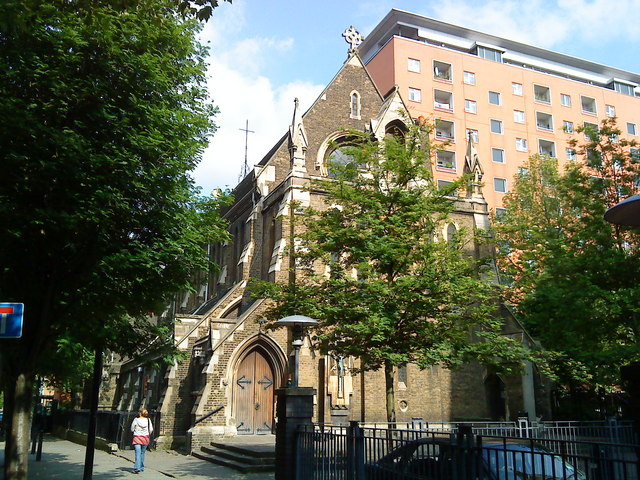
- Holy Cross Church, St Pancras
- Location: Cromer Street, London, WC1H 8JU
- Country: England
- Denomination: Church of England
- Churchmanship: Anglo-Catholic

History
- Status: Active

Architecture
- Functional status: Parish church
- Heritage designation: Grade II listed

Administration
- Diocese: Diocese of London
- Archdeaconry: Archdeaconry of Hampstead
- Deanery: South Camden
- Parish: Holy Cross with St. Jude and St. Peter, St. Pancras

Holy Cross Church is a church on Cromer Street in the St Pancras area of the London Borough of Camden. It was built 1887–88 by Joseph Peacock.

== History ==
The church began as a district chapelry in 1876 before becoming a parish in 1888. Its parish was merged with that of StJude Gray's Inn Road (demolished 1936) in 1935 and that of St Peter's Regent Square in 1954 (damaged in the Blitz and demolished in 1954). In 1988 its Crypt Centre was set up to work for the homeless, and the church is still in use under its parish priest Christopher Cawrse.

The church was designated a Grade II listed building on 14 May 1974. The painting Santa Maria Magdalena by Reginald Gray hangs in the small chapel.

As a result of industrial decline in the second half of the 20th century, by the 1980s the area around King's Cross Station, including Cromer Street, had become notorious for prostitution and drug abuse. In November 1982, the English Collective of Prostitutes staged a 12-day sit-in at Holy Cross as a protest against police harassment, attracting national media coverage. The then rector, Reverend Trevor Richardson, said at the time that the sit-in could continue so long as it didn't interfere with services. He also commented that too much attention was being paid to the women occupying the church and not enough to the evils of society that had given rise to their sit-in.

== Notable clergy ==
- Hope Patten, served his curacy here in the 1910s
