= Henry Phillips (singer) =

English singer

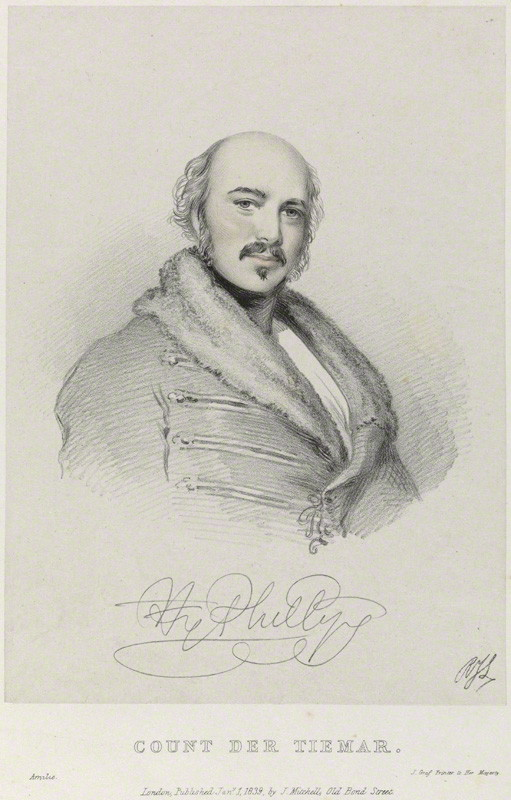
Henry Phillips, in character as Count der Tiemar in Amilie, or, The Love Test by William Michael Rooke, 1839 lithograph

Henry Phillips (1801–1876) was an English singer, who took on operatic roles in the 1820s and 1830s.

== Life ==
The son of Richard Phillips, an actor, he was born in Bristol on 13 August 1801. At age eight he appeared as a boy singer at Harrogate Theatre, and soon afterwards was engaged to sing soprano parts, first at the Haymarket Theatre, and then at Drury Lane Theatre.

Phillips became a pupil of Mr Broadhurst, and began his career as a bass at Covent Garden in Henry Rowley Bishop's Law of Java. At this time he was baritone, occasionally singing as a bass. His voice was weak, and he moved to Bath. He returned to London in 1823, studied under Sir George Smart, and was engaged by Charles Kemble to sing in Thomas Arne's Artaxerxes; but was a failure in it.

In 1824, however, Phillips sang Caspar in a production of Der Freischütz, with success, and his reputation rose. He participated in provincial musical festivals, and had much theatre and concert work. In 1825 he became principal bass at the Concerts of Antient Music, and entered the choir of London's Bavarian Chapel. In 1834 he sang at the Lyceum Theatre in Edward Loder's Nourjahad and in John Barnett's The Mountain Sylph, making a success of the ballad Farewell to the Mountain.

In 1843 Phillips began a series of "table entertainments", which he continued at intervals to the end of his career. In 1844 he visited America. On his return he sang in Maritana by Vincent Wallace, and Elijah. Mendelssohn composed a "scena" for him to words from Ossian, On Lena's gloomy heath, and he sang it at the Philharmonic Concert on 15 March 1847. After this his voice declined. His engagements gradually dropped off, and he retired at a farewell concert given on 25 February 1863.

Phillips then worked as a teacher, first at Birmingham, and then near London. He died at Dalston on 8 November 1876, and was buried at Brookwood Cemetery in Woking.

== Works ==
Phillips composed music for many songs, including "The best of all good Company", and "Shall I, wastynge in despaire". His autobiography appeared as Musical and Personal Recollections of Half a Century, 2 vols., London, 1864. He also wrote Hints on Declamation, London, 1848, and The True Enjoyment of Angling, London, 1843.
