= Elizabeth Jonas =

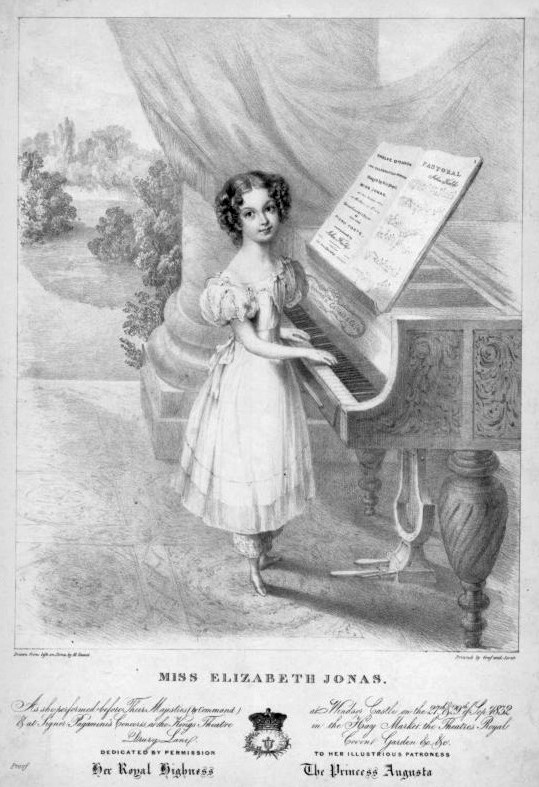

Elizabeth Gladman Jonas (born Southwark, London, England about 1825; died 1877) was an English pianist, child prodigy, and music teacher.

== Early life ==
Jonas was one of six children of John and Henrietta Jonas of 35 Prospect Place, Southwark; an 1851 London directory described her father as a "gentleman", so it is likely the family was a prosperous one. Jonas began piano lessons at four years of age and later studied with pianist and composer John Field around 1831–2; her public debut was at a concert of his in March 1832. In September 1832 she twice performed command performances at Windsor Castle. In 1833 she performed several times on the same bill with Niccolo Paganini. She later studied with Ignaz Moscheles. She was given a scholarship at the Royal Academy of Music in 1836 and re-elected in 1838; she studied there with Moscheles and with Thomas Attwood (until his death in 1838). She continued to perform publicly the music of Felix Mendelssohn, her teacher Moscheles, and others with success.

== Later career ==
Jonas taught piano at the Academy as early as 1838; following her graduation in 1841 she was hired by the Academy as a professor of piano and harmony - one of the first female professors at the Academy. She taught classes there until 1850. After her retirement she performed only in private, describing herself in 1854 as having been in ill health for several years. She actually survived many more years, dying in 1877, at which time she was living in St. John's Wood in London with her sister Emily (1831-1891).

== Images ==
The engraving above is by lithographer Maxim Gauci. A portrait of Jonas was exhibited at the Exhibition of the Royal Academy in 1838 by miniaturist Mary Mulready Leckie.
