= Cromer Street =

Road in King's Cross, London

Coordinates: 51°31′40″N 0°07′19″W

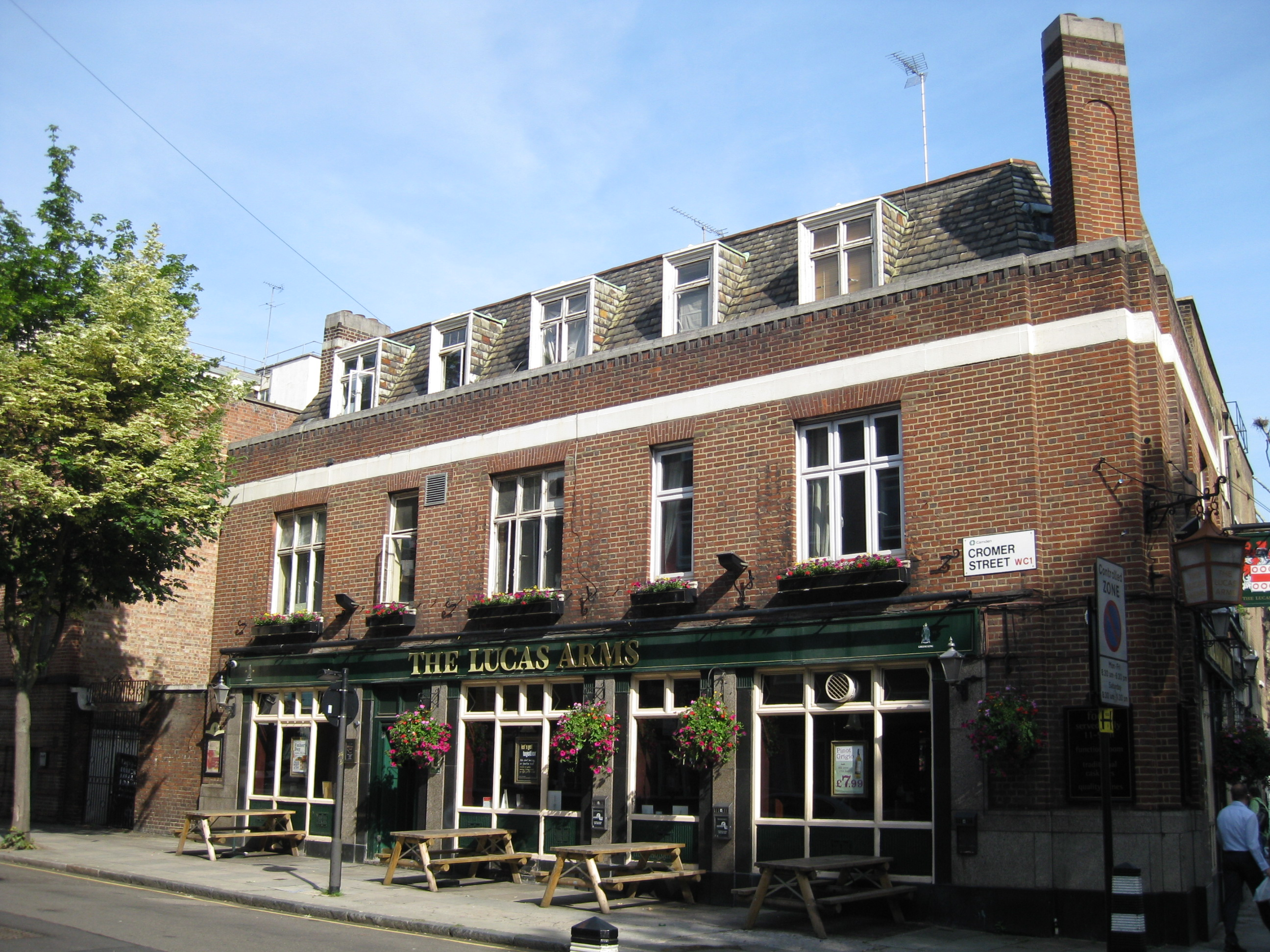
Lucas Arms at the East end junction with Gray's Inn Road

Cromer Street is a road in St Pancras, London in central London, England. It starts in the west at Judd Street, then goes east, ending at Gray's Inn Road. It gave access from Gray's Inn Road to Greenland Place and a bowling green.

== History ==
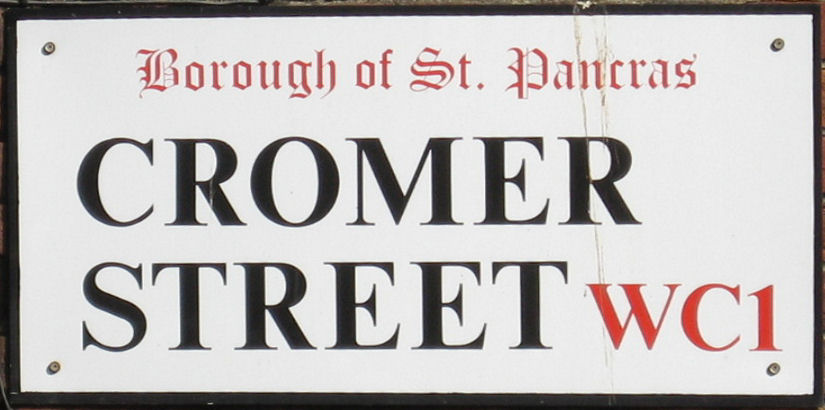
Sign showing the former borough

Cromer Street was formerly called Lucas Street and was renamed in 1818. In the earlier 1840s, it was described as being occupied by a class of 'more or less poor' 'small tradesmen and artisan lodgers' in densely crowded lodgings. On it is Church of the Holy Cross, which was built by Joseph Peacock and dedicated in 1888.

105 houses were built in the street in the early 19th century, but it has largely been rebuilt and consists of over 1,000 council and housing properties, mostly pre-1919 railway tenements of fine architectural qualities on the north side, and on the south a "striking sequence of nine 6-storey slabs of flats of 1949–1951 by Hening & Chitty... They were singled out by Pevsner in 1952 as some of the first good post-war flats" The area has suffered deprivation and crime and in 1996, was the subject of a £46 million regeneration project. Nowadays there is a very large Bangladeshi Muslim population living in the area.

== Transport ==
The nearest tube stations are King's Cross St Pancras, Russell Square, and Euston.

== Pubs ==
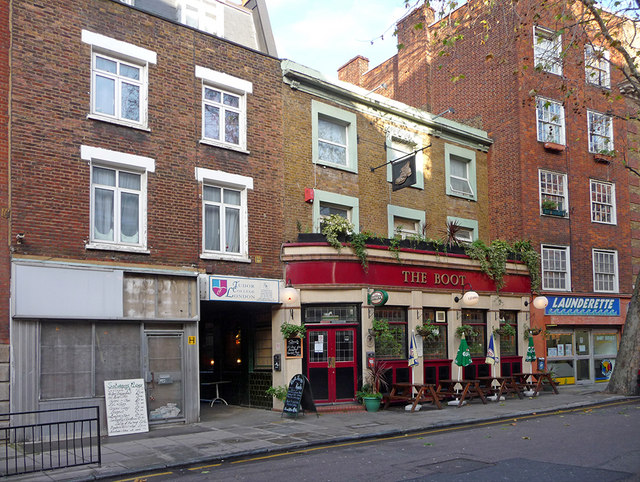
The Boot

The street has two pubs: The Lucas Arms at the east end, on the junction with Gray's Inn Road, and The Boot at the west end, near the junction with Judd Street. The Boot was the headquarters of the Gordon rioters and later was used as a location of some of the action in Charles Dickens' book, Barnaby Rudge; it was rebuilt in 1801. Kenneth Williams filmed a sequence in The Boot for the 1980s TV programme Comic Roots, since it was there that his parents and their friends met; when he was a child, he lived at No. 14 Cromer House. The Lucas Arms has been used for meetings of political organisations.
