= Bluebells of Scotland =

Traditional song

The Bluebells of Scotland is the usual modern name for a Scottish folksong (Roud # 13849). First published in 1801, it was written by Dorothea Jordan, an English actress and writer.

== Text ==
As with most folk songs, it exists in multiple versions. In the version printed in 1803 in the Scots Musical Museum, with "bluebells" in the title, and a different tune to the current one, the words are:

O where and O where does your highland laddie dwell;
O where and O where does your highland laddie dwell;
He dwells in merry Scotland where the bluebells sweetly smell,
And all in my heart I love my laddie well'

A broadside ballad version (words only) from slightly later in the 19th century makes references to George III and the Napoleonic Wars:

Oh, where, and oh, where is my highland laddie gone,
Oh, where, and oh, where is my highland laddie gone,
He's gone to fight the French, for King George upon the throne,
And it's oh in my heart I wish him safe at home

The bluebell is a flower; see Common bluebell and Campanula rotundifolia.

== Tune ==
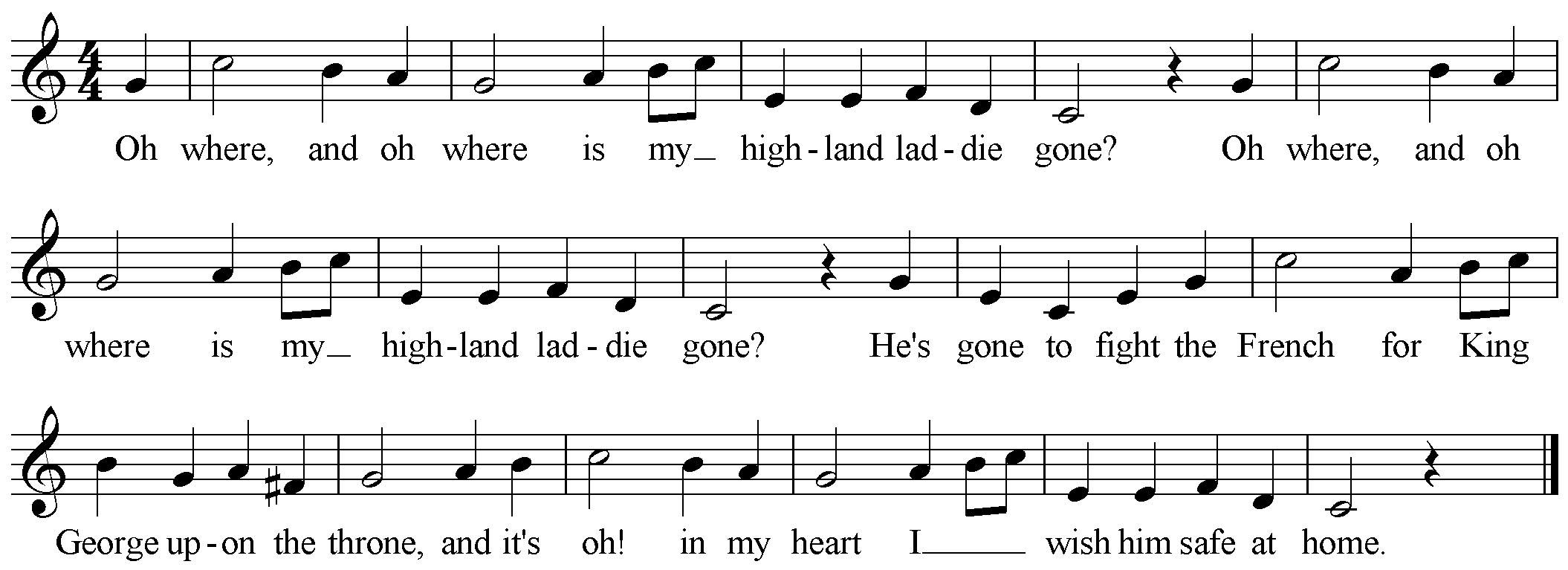

== Arrangements ==
Joseph Haydn wrote a piano trio accompaniment for this song (Hob. XXXIa: 176). George Eugene Griffin incorporated the tune into his Piano Concerto No. 1 in 1797, which became a popular success in England. It was published in 1805. Louis Drouet composed an "Etude Modulee" for flute based on the tune

Blue Bells of Scotland, for Trombone and Band (As performed by Dennis Smith)

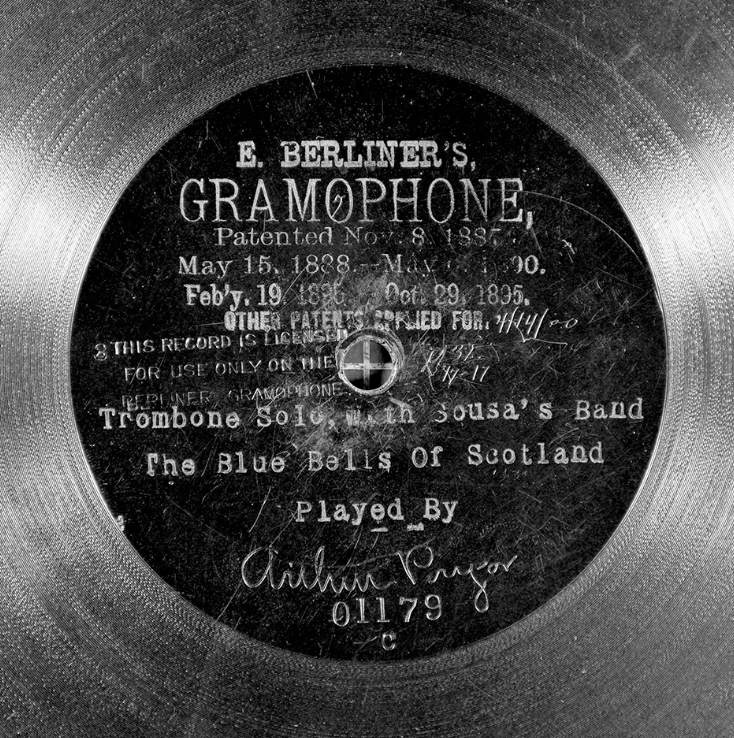
First record with band accompanient. Trombone solo by Arthur Pryor and Sousa's band, recorded in Apr 14, 1900

Trombone solo by Arthur Pryor and Sousa's band. Recorded Apr 14, 1900

The song was arranged by Arthur Pryor for trombone with accompaniment. This version is usually called "Blue Bells of Scotland". It is most commonly played with a piano or concert/military band but has also been performed with orchestra or brass band. Although the exact date is disputed due to some naming questions, Pryor probably composed the piece around 1897 and released it around 1899, as the first iteration of the song arranged for an instrument is a Berliner record recorded by him in 1897, played as a simple tune with few variations. The first band arrangement (and the first virtuosistic one) is also by him, accompanied by Sousa's band (of which he was a member), recorded in 1900

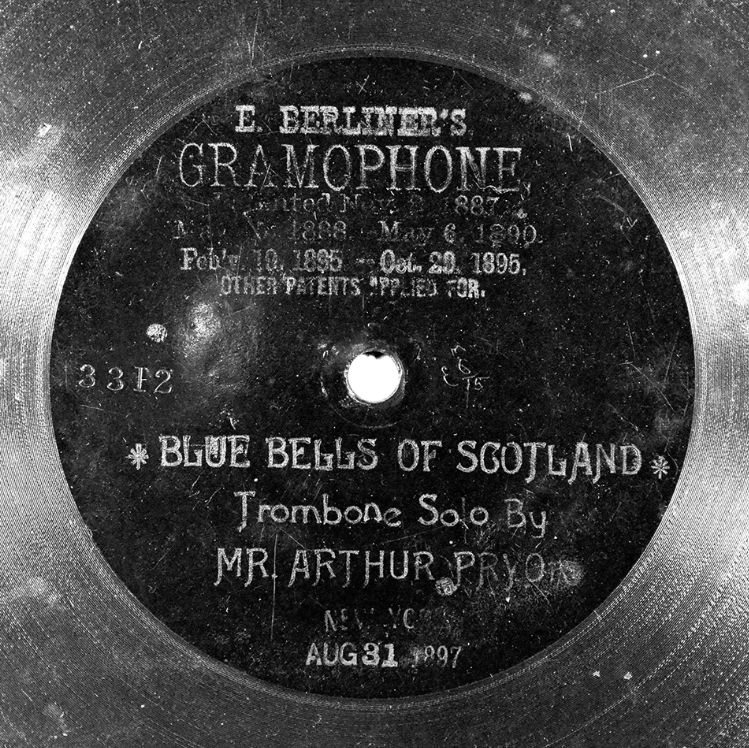
First recorded instance of the trombone arrangement. Recorded by Arthur Pryor in Aug 31, 1897

This version is technically challenging and allows the soloist to show off a flowing legato while, in different places, requiring some difficult jumps. The sheer speed and volume of notes also pose a significant challenge. It is in theme and variation form and opens with a cadenza-like introduction. After the theme, it moves to the allegro section, in which the variations begin. Variation one involves triplets, while variation two involves syncopated sixteenth-eighth note rhythms. The cadenza that follows demonstrates the performer's range; jumping about three and a half octaves from high C (an octave above middle C) to pedal A flat and G, for example. The vivace finale brings all these techniques into one, requiring the trombonist to exhibit advanced range, legato, double tonguing, and flexibility. Thus, the piece is limited to the best trombonists, although there have been numerous recordings by such famed players as Joseph Alessi, Christian Lindberg and Ian Bousfield. It is often considered to be the trombone (and euphonium) equivalent (in terms of required mastery of the instrument) to the Carnival of Venice for trumpet or cornet, by Jean-Baptiste Arban.

Marines Hymn-Blue Bells of Scotland (As performed by Piper Johnny)

American composer Leroy Anderson composed an orchestral arrangement of the tune for the 3rd movement of his "Scottish Suite" (1954) which gives a very clean and sprightly melody to the high strings and woodwinds.

Bing Crosby included the song in a medley on his album 101 Gang Songs (1961).

Numerous bagpipe bands play arrangements of the song, typically in a medley with one or more tunes such as the Marines Hymn.

Alabama State University Founder's Day is celebrated on William Burns Paterson's birthday on 9 February. It has been remembered every year since 1901. The Bluebells of Scotland which was Paterson's favourite song was regularly sung.

== Bibliography ==
- Herbert, Trevor and John Wallace, eds. (1997). The Cambridge Companion to Brass Instruments. Cambridge: Cambridge University Press.
- Less, Gene (2003). Friends Along the Way: A Journey Through Jazz. New Haven: Yale University Press.
