= Theodore Lane =

English painter and engraver

Theodore Lane (c. 1800–1828) was an English painter and engraver.

== Life ==
Lane was the son of a poor drawing-master from Worcester. At 14 he was apprenticed in London to John Barrow of Weston Place, St. Pancras, an artist and colourer of prints.

Lane first came into notice as a painter of water-colour portraits and miniatures. About 1825 he took up oil painting. He was left-handed, but with the help of Alexander George Fraser became proficient.

Lane died in an accident: while waiting for a friend at the horse repository in Gray's Inn Road he by mistake stepped upon a skylight, and, falling on the pavement below, was killed, 21 May 1828. He was buried in Old St. Pancras church-yard.

== Works ==
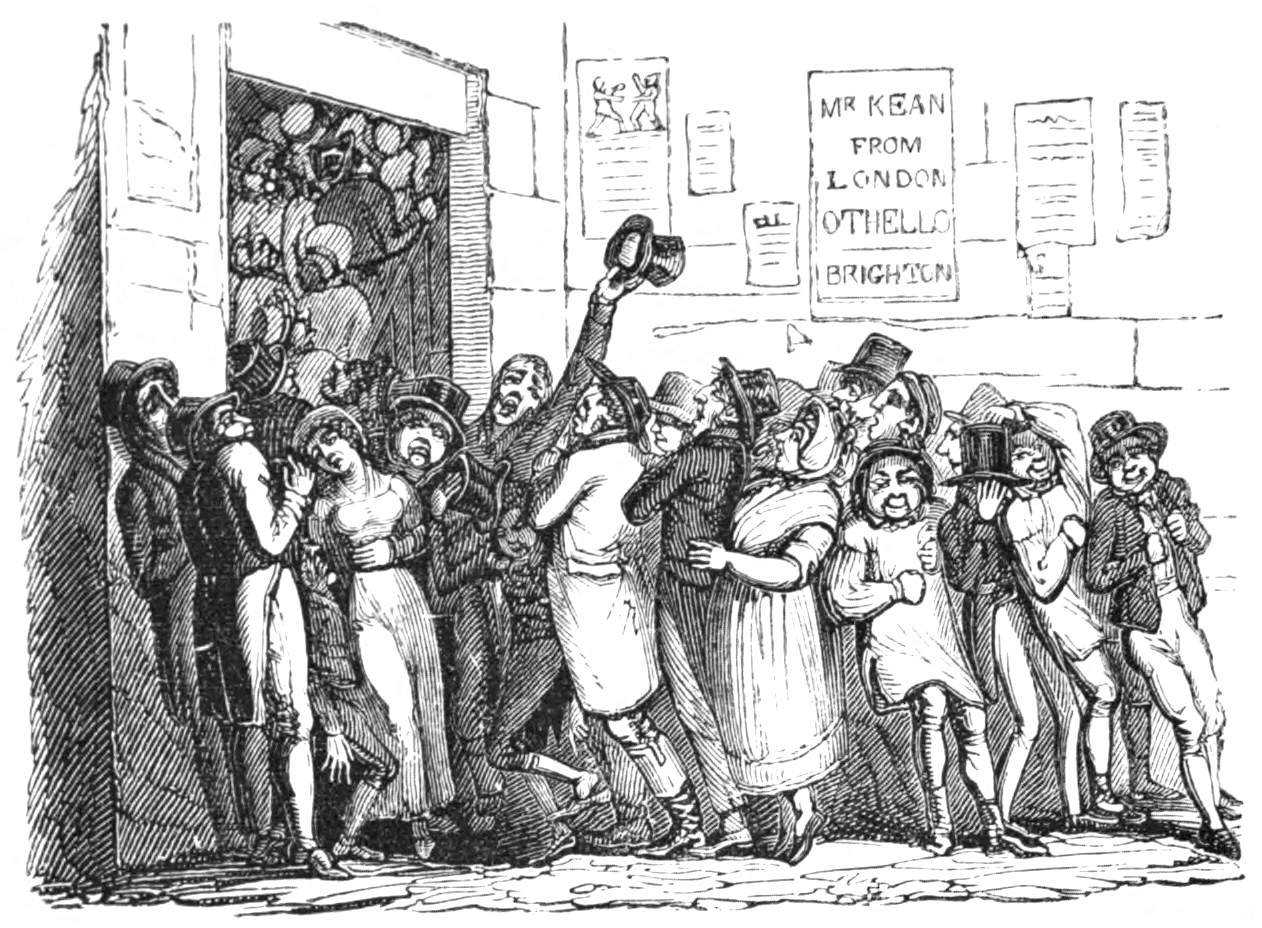
The Gallery - Powerful Attraction of Talent by Theodore Lane

Lane exhibited water-colours and miniatures at the Royal Academy in 1819, 1820, and 1826. He had a talent for humorous subjects, and a series of thirty-six designs by him, entitled The Life of an Actor, with letterpress by Pierce Egan, was published in 1825. Lane also etched some prints of sporting and social life: Masquerade at the Argyll Rooms, Scientific Pursuits, or Hobby Horse Races to the Temple of Fame, and A Trip to Ascot Races, a series of scenes on the road from Hyde Park Corner to Ascot Heath, which he dedicated to the king, 1827. He illustrated with etchings and woodcuts A Complete Panorama of the Sporting World, and Egan's Anecdotes of the Turf, 1827.

In 1827 Lane sent to the Academy The Christmas Present, and to the British Institution An Hour before the Duel. In 1828 his Disturbed by the Nightmare was exhibited at the Academy, Reading the Fifth Act of the Manuscript at the British Institution, and The Enthusiast at the Suffolk Street Gallery.

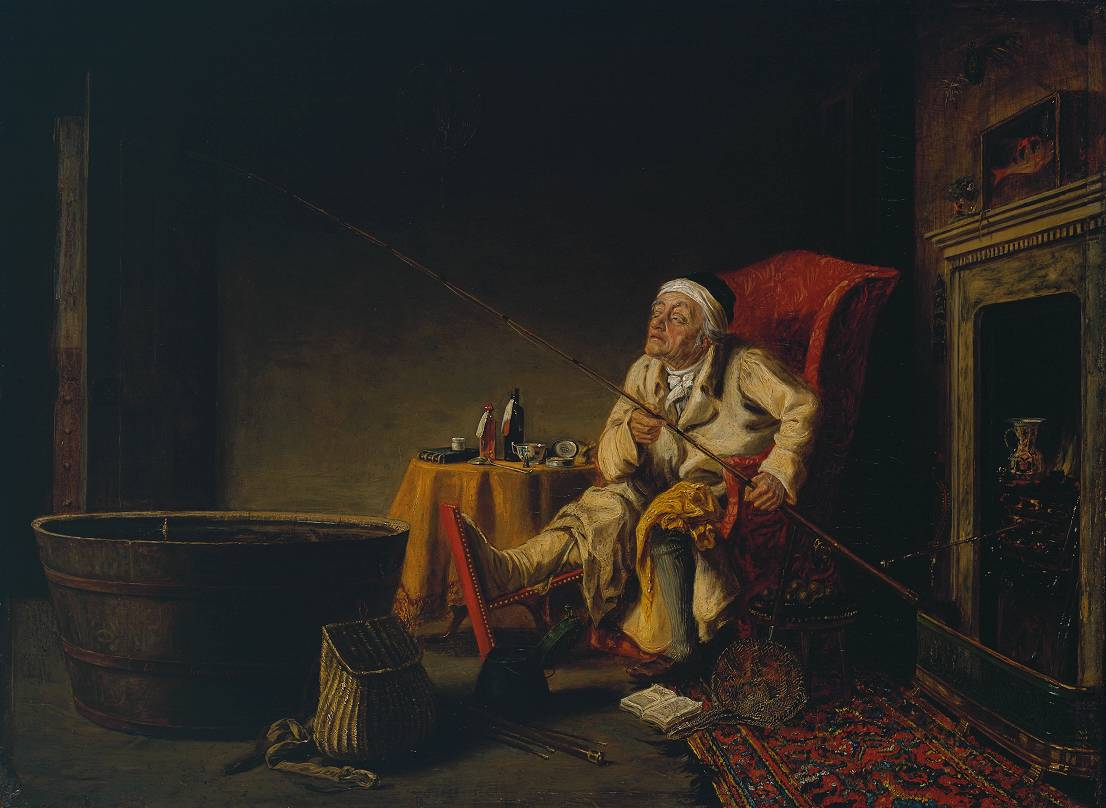
Enthusiast ('The Gouty Angler') by Theodore Lane, Tate collection

Theodore Lane was a political lampoonist and in 1820 created a series of satirical images of Queen Caroline at the time of her return to England to claim her rights as consort to George IV. Lane caricatured the queen as a grotesque, overdressed and overweight, accompanied by her Italian lover, Bartolomeo Pergami and the then Lord Mayor of London, Matthew Wood. Images included Returning Justice lifts aloft her Scale,The Man of the Woods & the Cat-o'-Mountain, Delicious Dreams, The Queen's A-s in a Bandbox and Moments of Pleasure.

Lane left a widow and three children, for whose benefit his best-known work, The Enthusiast, representing a gouty angler fishing in a tub of water, was engraved by Robert Graves; it was subsequently purchased by Robert Vernon, was engraved by Henry Beckwith for the Art Journal in 1850, and went to the National Gallery, ending in the Tate collection. His picture Mathematical Abstraction, which he left unfinished, was completed by Fraser, and purchased by John Rushout, 2nd Baron Northwick; it also was engraved by Graves.

In 1831 Pierce Egan published The Show Folks, illustrated with woodcuts designed by Lane. It was accompanied by a memoir of him.
