= John Baptiste Calkin =

English composer, organist and teacher

John Baptiste Calkin (16 March 1827, London – 15 April 1905, Hornsey, London) was an English composer, organist and music teacher.

== Life ==
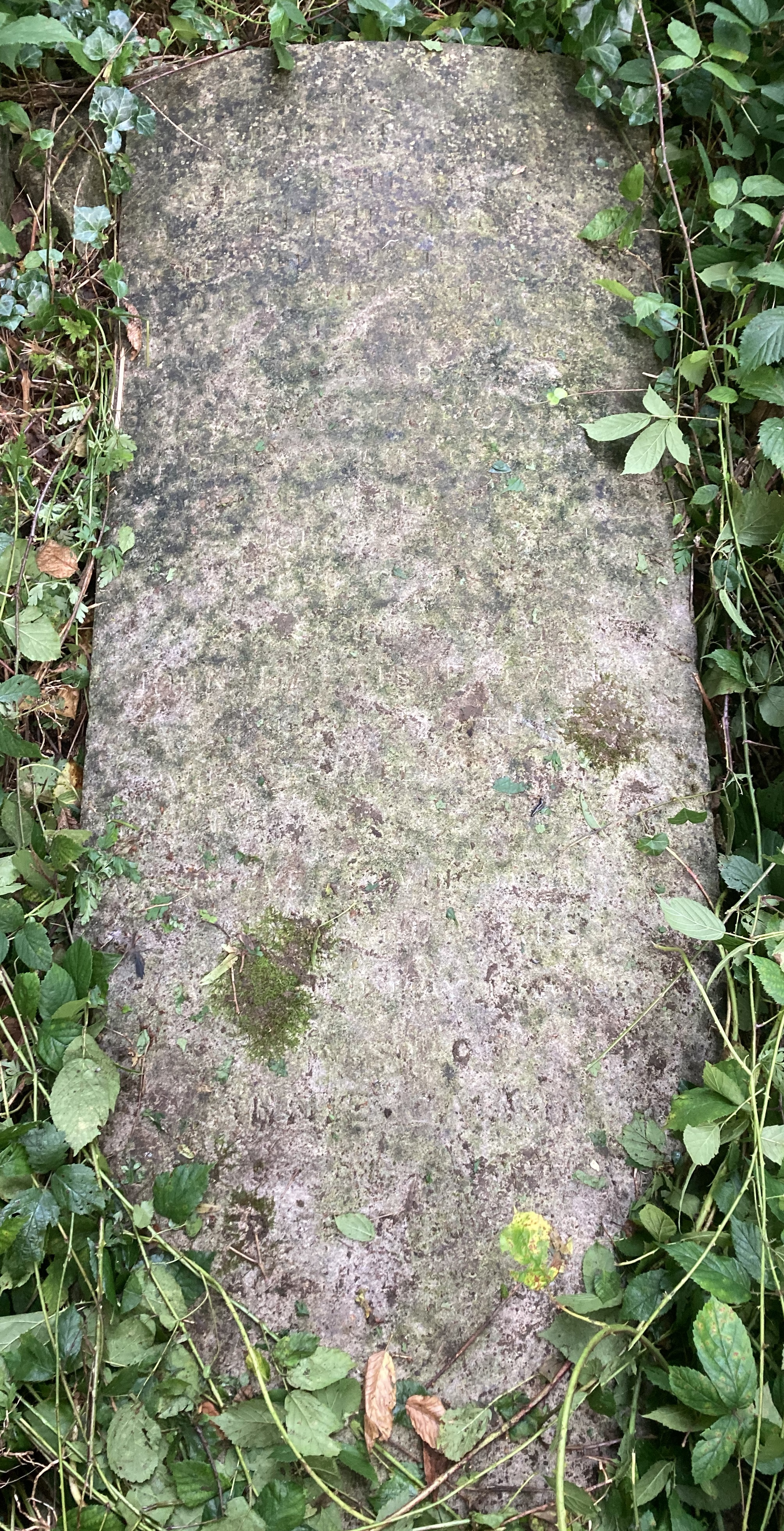
Family grave of John Baptiste Calkin in Highgate Cemetery

He was born in London on 16 March 1827, the son of James Calkin (1786–1862), composer and pianist, and Victoire. Reared in a musical atmosphere, he studied music under his father; his three brothers, Joseph, James, and George, also adopted the profession.

When nineteen Calkin was appointed organist, precentor, and choirmaster of St Columba's College, Dublin, in succession to Edwin George Monk. St. Columba's College was a school mainly for boys of the upper classes and for candidates for the ministry of the Church of Ireland; music and the Irish language were prominent features in the curriculum. From 1846 to 1853, Calkin maintained a high standard of choral music at St. Columba's, and he cultivated composition. From 1853 to 1863 he was organist and choirmaster of Woburn Chapel, London; from 1863 to 1868 organist of Camden Road Chapel; and from 1870 to 1884 organist at St. Thomas's Church, Camden Town.

In 1883, Calkin became professor at the Guildhall School of Music under Thomas Henry Weist-Hill, and concentrated on teaching and composing. He was on the council of Trinity College, London, a member of the Philharmonic Society (1862), and a fellow of the College of Organists, incorporated in 1893.

Calkin died at Hornsey Rise Gardens on 15 April 1905 and was buried, with his brother George, in a family grave (plot no.17965) on the western side of Highgate Cemetery.

== Works ==
As a composer, Calkin essayed many forms, but his sacred music is best known, especially his morning and evening services in B flat, G, and D. The fact that his communion service in C is listed as "Op. 134" is an indicator of his prolific composing. He wrote much for the organ, including numerous transcriptions, and he scored many string arrangements, as well as original sonatas and duos. His hymn tunes, though not published in Hymns Ancient and Modern, are in other collections such as the Congregational Church Hymnal (1883).

Calkin's setting of "Fling out the Banner" (by Bishop G. W. Doane) had a great vogue in America and the British colonies, and was included in the Canadian Book of Common Praise (1909), edited by Sir George Martin. His "Agape" was composed specially for the Church Hymnary of Scotland (1871), to the words "Jesu, most loving God", and was inserted in the Church Hymnal of Ireland (1874).

His best known work is the setting from 1872 of a popular Christmas poem I Heard the Bells on Christmas Day by Henry Wadsworth Longfellow.

=== List of works ===
Scores available at Alexander Street Press.

==== Partsongs ====
- Breathe ye soft winds, op. 48 (available for ATTB or SATB)

==== Sacred Music ====
- Hosanna to the Son of David
- Out of the deep, op. 53
- Magnificat and Nunc Dimittis in F, op. 107
- Morning, Evening and Communion Service in D
- Morning and Evening Service in G
- Morning and Evening Service in B-flat
- Communion Service in C, op. 134
- Responses to the Commandments in B-flat [1]
- Responses to the Commandments in B-flat [2]
- Responses to the Commandments in D

===== Hymn Tunes =====
- Hymn for Easter
- Agape
- Bradfield (CM)
- Calkin (6.6.8.8)
- Dedication (SM)
- Elim (7.6.7.6D)
- Fatherhood (DCM)
- Let Music Break on This Blest Morn
- Magdalen (10.4.10.4)
- Munus (7.7.7.7)
- Nox Praecessit (CM)
- Panis Celestis (6.5.6.5.6.5)
- Ramoth (7.7.7.7D)
- St Augustine (11.10.11.6)
- St David (11.11.11.11)
- Savoy Chapel (7.6.7.6.7.6)
- Sefton (LM)
- Waltham (LM)
- Winchcombe (10.10.10.10)

==== Organ Music ====
- Andante
- Hommage à Mozart
- Marche Religieuse, op. 61
- Allegretto, op. 62
- Organ Study on Pleyel's hymn tune, op. 63
- Hommage à Haydn, op. 64
- Allegretto Religioso [op. 65?]
- Minuet and Trio [op. 66?]
- Festal March [op. 67?]
- Andante Espressivo, op. 68
- Hommage à Mendelssohn, op. 81
- Harvest Thanksgiving March, op. 85
- Two part Song without words, op. 86
- Minuetto [in B minor], op. 90
- Andante con moto, op. 101
- For Holy Communion
