= William Hawes (composer) =

English musician and composer

William Hawes (1785 – 18 February 1846) was an English musician and composer. He was the Master of the Children of the Chapel Royal and musical director of the Lyceum Theatre bringing several notable works to the public's attention.

== Life ==
Hawes was born in London, and was for eight years (1793–1801) a chorister of the Chapel Royal, where he studied music, mainly under Edmund Ayrton. He subsequently held various musical posts, being master of the choristers at St Paul's Cathedral in London from 1812 to 1846.

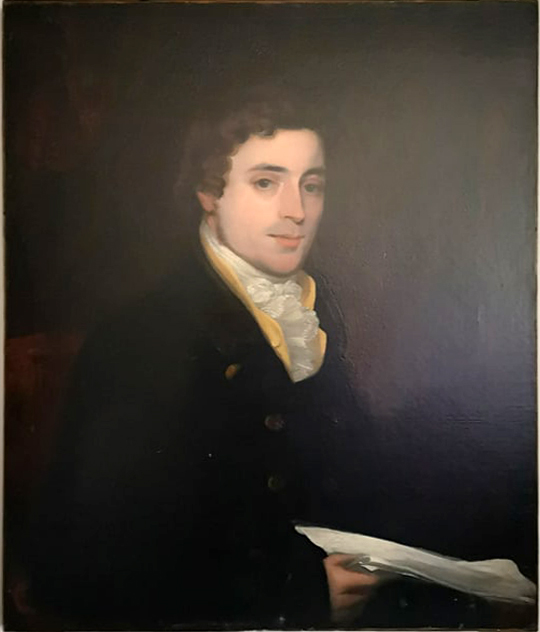
William Hawes - 1785-1846 : Oil by William Medland

In 1816 his third daughter, Maria Hawes, was born. She was baptised in the same year and the singer Elizabeth Billington was her godmother. Her full name was Maria Dowding Billington Hawes and she would be a noted singer.

In 1817 he was appointed Master of the Children of the Chapel Royal. According to one of the choristers under his charge at that time, Samuel Sebastian Wesley, William Hawes was a disciplinarian who would freely whip the choirboys with a riding whip when they made mistakes. Wesley remembered Maria Hackett giving them succulent buns to help alleviate the pain.

In 1818 Hawes was a founding member of the Regent’s Harmonic Institution (later renamed the Royal Harmonic Institution in 1820); a music publishing firm established with the intent of raising funds for the Royal Philharmonic Society and its restoration of the Argyll Rooms. Eventually Hawes and composer Thomas Welsh obtained a controlling interest in this publishing firm, and it became known as 'Welsh and Hawes, at the Royal Harmonic Institution' in September 1825. Hawes remained active in this music publishing enterprise until July 1827 when he declared bankruptcy; although the firm continued to publish music under Welsh's leadership through May 1833.

Hawes was for many years musical director of the Lyceum Theatre, London, then devoted to English opera. In this capacity (on 23 July 1824), he introduced Weber's Der Freischütz for the first time in England, at first slightly curtailed, but soon afterwards in its entirety. Winter's Interrupted Sacrifice, Mozart's Così fan tutte, Marschner's Der Vampyr and other important works were also brought out under his auspices.

Hawes wrote or compiled the music for numerous pieces. Better were his glees and madrigals, of which he published two series. His The bee, the golden daughter of the spring won at the Glee Club in 1836. He also edited and published in 1814 the first re-edition of The Triumphs of Oriana.

His great-great-grandson was the composer Sir Malcolm Arnold

Cultural offices
Preceded by John Stafford Smith	Master of the Children of the Chapel Royal; 1817-1846	Succeeded by Thomas Helmore
