= Regent Square, London =

Public square in London, England

Coordinates: 51.5268°N 0.1216°W

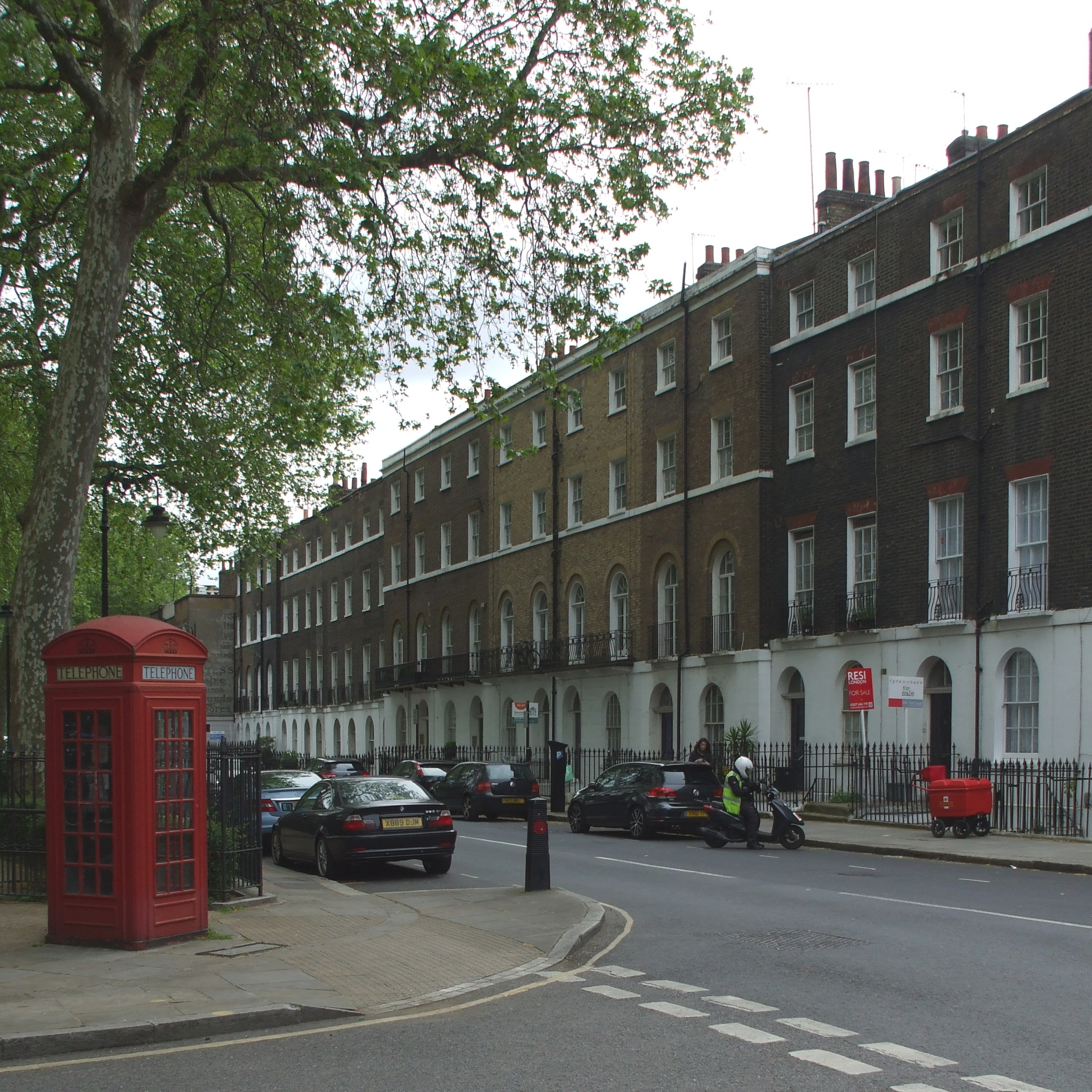
The Grade II-listed southern side of Regent Square, with the Grade II-listed phone box

Regent Square is a public square and street in St Pancras, London, England, since 1965 part of the London Borough of Camden. It is located near Kings Cross and Bloomsbury.

Regent Square was laid out around a large garden in the historic Harrison Estate and first occupied in 1829, forming a garden square similar to more famous ones to the west in Bloomsbury. The southern side of the square is composed of its original buildings, and is Grade II listed in its entirety. Also listed is the phone box within the square gardens themselves.

Regent Square was home to the National Scotch Church (the 'Caledonian Church') – the first purpose-built Scottish Gaelic Presbyterian church in London – which was built between 1824 and 1827. In 1843, it became an English Presbyterian church. The square was also home to St Peter's Church, a Church of England church. Both churches were struck by bombs in World War II and subsequently demolished.
