= Wilhelm Cramer =

English violinist and conductor (1746 - 1799)

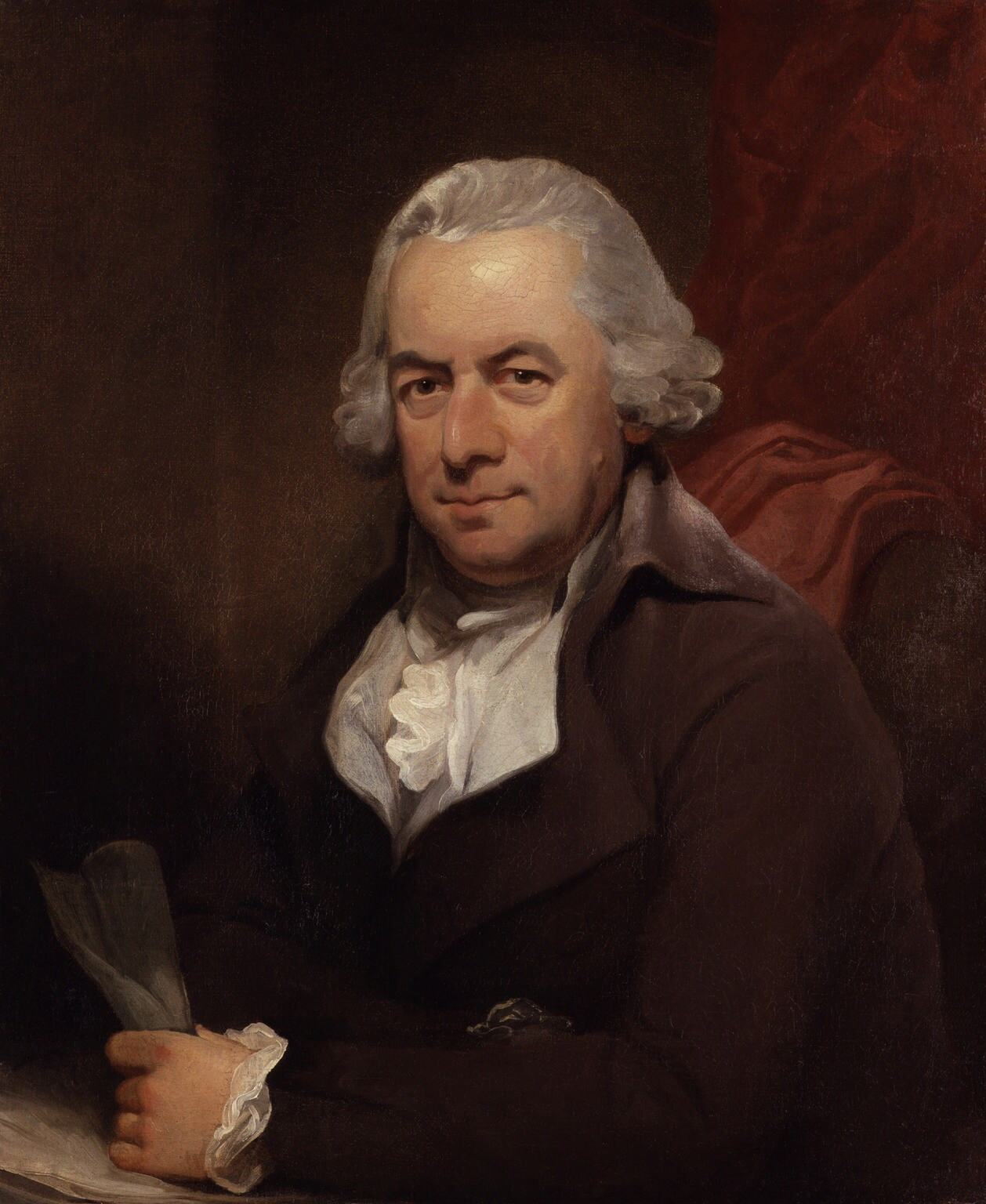
Portrait painting of Wilhelm Cramer by the English painter Thomas Hardy in 1794, painted for the British music publisher and seller John Bland.

Wilhelm Cramer (2 June 1746, Mannheim – 5 October 1799, London) was a London violinist and musical conductor of German origin. He was the son of a Mannheim violinist, Jakob Cramer (1705–70), and part of a large family who were connected with music during both the 18th and 19th centuries. He is the father of the famous English composer Johann Baptist Cramer and of the English violinist and conductor Franz Cramer.

Cramer joined the Mannheim Orchestra in 1757. He then moved to Stuttgart to work for the Duke of Württemberg, from where he obtained permission to travel to Paris and London. With encouragement from Johann Christian Bach he settled permanently in England from 1772. He soon became London’s foremost violinist, leading the Bach–Abel concerts, the Professional Concert series (1785–93) at the Hanover Square Rooms, the Italian Opera (1777–1796), the Concert of Ancient Music, and the Handel Commemoration in 1784. He also composed eight violin concertos and some chamber works

Cramer Street in London's Marylebone district is named after him.
