= Concerts of Antient Music =

London concert series, 1776–1848

Program for the 1780 concerts of the Concerts of Antient Music

The Concerts of Antient Music, also known as the Ancient Concerts or The King's Concerts, were an influential concert series put on annually in London from 1776 to 1848. The concerts consisted solely of music composed at least twenty years previous (although sometimes revised for the tastes or instrumentation of the time). The concerts had aristocratic or royal sponsorship and featured some of the best musicians of the day. At first, twelve concerts were given each year; in 1785 a thirteenth concert, a performance of Handel's Messiah to benefit retired musicians, was added at King George III's command.

The founding committee in 1776 included the Earl of Sandwich, the Earl of Exeter, the Viscount Dudley and Ward, and John Egerton, the Bishop of Durham. From the year 1785 the royal family was usually in attendance, and patronized the concerts as well. King George III personally wrote out the programmes, and in the later years Prince Albert was one of the directors.

The programmes at first consisted mostly of Handel, with a few works by Corelli, Geminiani, Charles Avison, and others. After 1826 the concerts added works by Mozart and a greater variety of other composers; Beethoven's works appeared after 1835.

The concerts were first held in the New Rooms on Tottenham Street, later known as the Queen's or West London Theatre. In 1795 they were moved to a concert hall at the Opera House, and then in 1804 to the Hanover Square Rooms.

== Notable musicians involved with the concerts ==
- Conductors: Joah Bates (1776-1793), Thomas Greatorex (1793-1831), William Knyvett (1832–39), Henry Bishop (1843-8) (Sir George Smart, Henry Bishop, Charles Lucas, and James Turle conducted concerts in 1840-3, when the series was without a permanent conductor.)
- Orchestra leaders: Wilhelm Cramer (1780-1799)
- Organist: Charles Lucas (1841-8)
- Singers: Harriett Abrams, Brigida Banti, James Bartleman, Elizabeth Billington, Anna Bishop, John Braham, Angelica Catalani, Samuel Thomas Champnes, Michael Kelly, Gertrud Elisabeth Mara, Maria Frances Parke, Catherine Stephens, Eliza Salmon, Jane Shirreff, Nancy Storace
- Instrumentalists: John Crosdill, Domenico Dragonetti, John Ella, Frantisek Kotzwara, Nicolas Mori. In 1847 Felix Mendelssohn performed solo on the organ the Prelude and Fugue in B-flat major on the name B-A-C-H attributed at the time to Bach.

Much of the music from these concerts was presented to the Royal College of Music by Queen Victoria, where it now forms part of the College's extensive collections.

== See also ==
- Professional Concerts
- Vocal Concerts
