= Eliza Salmon =

English vocalist

Eliza Salmon (1787 – 5 June 1849) was an English vocalist.

== Life ==
Salmon was born at Oxford in 1787, her father was named Munday and had a musical background. Her mother's brothers, John Mahon (b. 1746) and William Mahon (1753–1816), were noted clarinettists. Their sisters (Eliza's aunts), Mrs. Warton, Mrs. Ambrose, and Mrs. Second (1777–1805), were excellent vocalists. Mrs. Second sang at the Three Choirs Festival in 1795, and at the Royal Opera House in 1796. Her voice was of rare quality, and she "sang up to F in alt with ease" (Parke).

Eliza Munday became a pupil of John James Ashley. On 4 March 1803 she made her first appearance in oratorio at Covent Garden, Miss Stephens having at that period the first place as a singer. The young Munday, gifted with a voice of beautiful tone, a charming manner, and a face "of dazzling fairness," obtained immediate success; but her attempt to embellish her solo singing with inappropriate tricks was condemned by critics.

After acquiring further experience Eliza Munday learnt to employ her executive powers more judiciously. She married, at Liverpool on 11 February 1806, James Salmon, organist of St. Peter's, Liverpool, whose father, James Salmon the elder (died 1827), was lay clerk of St. George's Chapel, Windsor, and whose brother William (1789–1858), after holding the same position, was lay clerk of Westminster and taught singing.

In 1813 Eliza Salmon's husband enlisted and went to the West Indies with his regiment, where he died. Mrs. Salmon sang constantly at the Three Choirs Festivals from 1812 until 1824, and was soon deemed indispensable at oratorios and concerts in London. So numerous were her engagements that she had been known, in those days of difficult journeys, to travel some four hundred miles in six days, appearing at the large towns on the way. Her professional income during 1823 is said to have reached £5,000. Suddenly, in a moment it was even said, during an ancient music concert at the beginning of May 1825, Mrs. Salmon's voice collapsed. Her husband died before her voice failed. During her widowhood she sought for pupils, but in vain. She married for a second time a clergyman named Hinde, who died about 1840, leaving her destitute. After several years of poverty she died, aged 62, at 33 King's Road, Chelsea, on 5 June 1849.

The magic of Mrs. Salmon's voice lay in its tone. It was likened by several critics to that of musical glasses. A critic in the Quarterly Musical Magazine, probably Richard Mackenzie Bacon, wrote in 1823 that "When I hear such a singer as Miss Stephens or Mrs. Salmon, the power of ductility seems carried to its utmost. There are no roughnesses, no breaks—the metal is drawn out exactly, and if we could run it along between the finger and the thumb, or pass the nail over the surface, it would be as even, as smooth, and as polished to the touch as it is brilliant to the ear." This description rules out any possibility of vibrato. Henry Phillips wrote that when Thomas Lindsay Willman, the clarinettist, accompanied Mrs. Salmon, it was difficult at times to distinguish the voice from the instrument. But Mrs. Salmon was no musician, although perfectly drilled into everything the orchestra then required. She gave no character to anything she sang.

== Family ==
Her daughter, also called Eliza, was born on 10 January 1807 in Liverpool and married Louis Hantute on 28 October 1826 in London. She was also a singer, as well as a composer and wrote seven songs, two of them on poems by Marceline Desbordes-Valmore, in 1831, before dying in Paris on 23 October 1840.
