= Thomas Attwood (composer) =

English composer and organist (1765–1838)

External videos
- Psalm 50 on YouTube Anglican chant (Choir of King's College, Cambridge)
- Teach me, O Lord on YouTube Anthem (The Choir of Somerville College, Oxford)

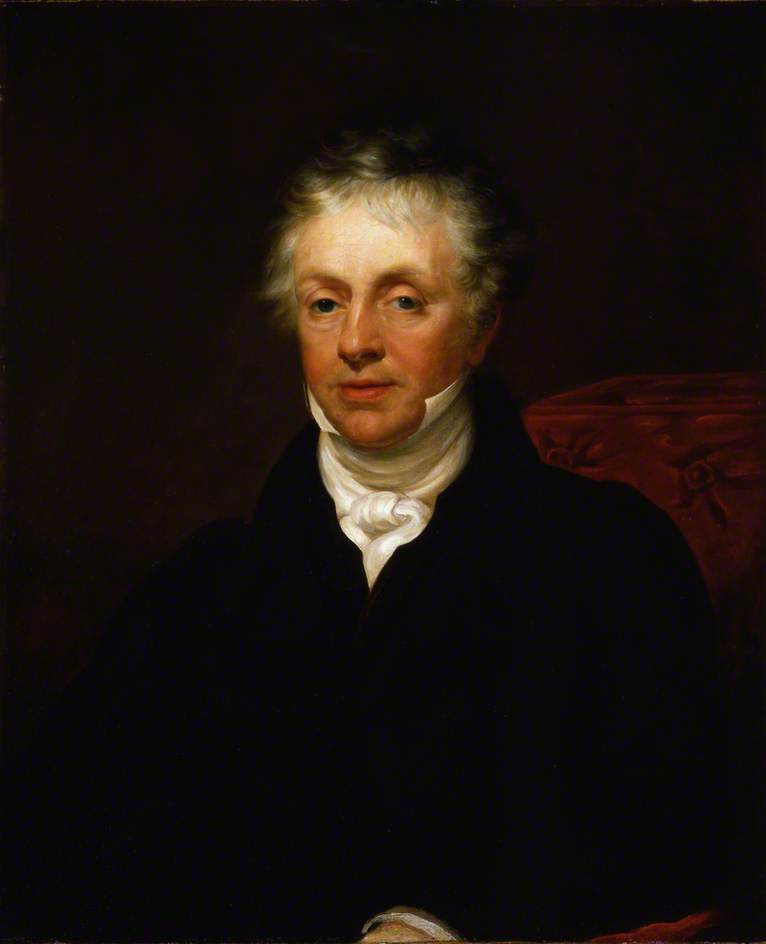
Thomas Attwood

Thomas Attwood (23 November 1765 – 24 March 1838) was an English composer and organist. Attwood studied under Mozart and he was friendly with Felix Mendelssohn.

== Early life ==
The son of a musician in the royal band, Attwood was born in London, probably in Pimlico. At the age of nine he became a chorister in the Chapel Royal, where he received training in music from James Nares and Edmund Ayrton. In 1783 he was sent to study abroad at the expense of the Prince of Wales (afterwards King George IV), who had been favourably impressed by his skill at the harpsichord. After two years in Naples, Attwood proceeded to Vienna, where he became a favourite pupil of Mozart. On his return to London in 1787 he held for a short time an appointment as one of the chamber musicians to the Prince of Wales.

== Career ==
In 1796 he was chosen as the organist of St Paul's Cathedral, and in the same year he was made composer of the Chapel Royal. His court connection was further confirmed by his appointment as musical instructor to the Duchess of York, and afterwards to the Princess of Wales. In January 1806, he played his own composition, Grand Dirge, on the organ for the funeral of Lord Nelson, the only piece specially written for the occasion. For the coronation of George IV, he composed a setting of the traditional anthem I was Glad, which was also used at the coronations of King William IV and Queen Victoria. The king, who had neglected him for some years on account of his connection with the Princess of Wales, now restored him to favour, and in 1821 appointed him organist to his private chapel at Brighton.

Attwood was also one of the original members of the Royal Philharmonic Society (RPS), founded in 1813. He was also a founding member of the Regent’s Harmonic Institution; a music publishing firm established in 1818 with the backing of the RPS. Soon after the institution of the Royal Academy of Music in 1823, Attwood was chosen to be one of the professors. He wrote the anthem O Lord, Grant the King a Long Life for the coronation of William IV, and he was composing a similar work for the coronation of Queen Victoria when he died at his house at 75 Cheyne Walk, Chelsea, on 24 March 1838.

Attwood's funeral took place at St Paul's Cathedral on 31 March 1838. He is buried in the cathedral, in the crypt, under the organ.

== Compositions ==
Thomas Attwood's services and anthems were published in a collected form after his death by his godson and pupil Thomas Attwood Walmisley. Attwood is now known only for a few short anthems; these include Teach me, O Lord (1797), O God who by the leading of a star (1814), Turn Thy face from my sins (1831), and Come, Holy Ghost (1834). His compositions show the influence of his teacher Mozart, but also the Georgian tradition of English church music of his early training, producing a "union of styles" which remained influential throughout the 19th century. Besides his ecclesiastical work, Attwood wrote music and songs for some twenty musical plays and comic operas between 1792 and 1807. He was also a prolific writer of glees, including A Rose-Bud by my Early Walk (c. 1819), a poem by Robert Burns.

He taught John Goss, Cipriani Potter, his godson Thomas Attwood Walmisley, and child prodigy Elizabeth Jonas. Through his friendship with Mendelssohn, he greatly encouraged the young William Sterndale Bennett

== Family life ==
In 1793, Thomas Attwood married Mary Denton, they had five sons and one daughter. The eldest son was a lieutenant in the Royal Engineers but was murdered in Seville in 1821. His second son, George Attwood, was the rector of Framlingham and his third son, a solicitor, predeceased his father in a riding accident. His fourth son was an estate manager in Jamaica and the fifth was also a clergyman.

Attwood had heard Felix Mendelssohn play during a visit to London in 1829. Following a tour of Scotland and Wales, Mendelssohn returned to the capital but fell out of a carriage and suffered a leg injury; while he was recovering, he received a large hamper from Attwood and was invited to stay at the family home at Beulah Hill in Norwood as soon as he was able to travel. Mendelssohn composed a piece for harp and piano called The Evening Bell, suggested by the gate bell at Attwood's house. Following a second stay at Norwood in 1832, Mendelssohn dedicated his Three Preludes and Fugues for the Organ (Op. 37) to Attwood.

== Notes ==
Cultural offices
| Preceded by Thomas Sanders Dupuis | Composer of the Chapel Royal; 1796-1838 | Succeeded by George Thomas Smart |
| Preceded by John Stafford Smith | Organist of the Chapel Royal; 1836-1838 | Succeeded by George Cooper |
| Preceded by John Jones | Organist and Master of the Choristers of St Paul's Cathedral; 1796–1838 | Succeeded by John Goss |
