= Nicolas Mori =

British musician and publisher (1796–1839)

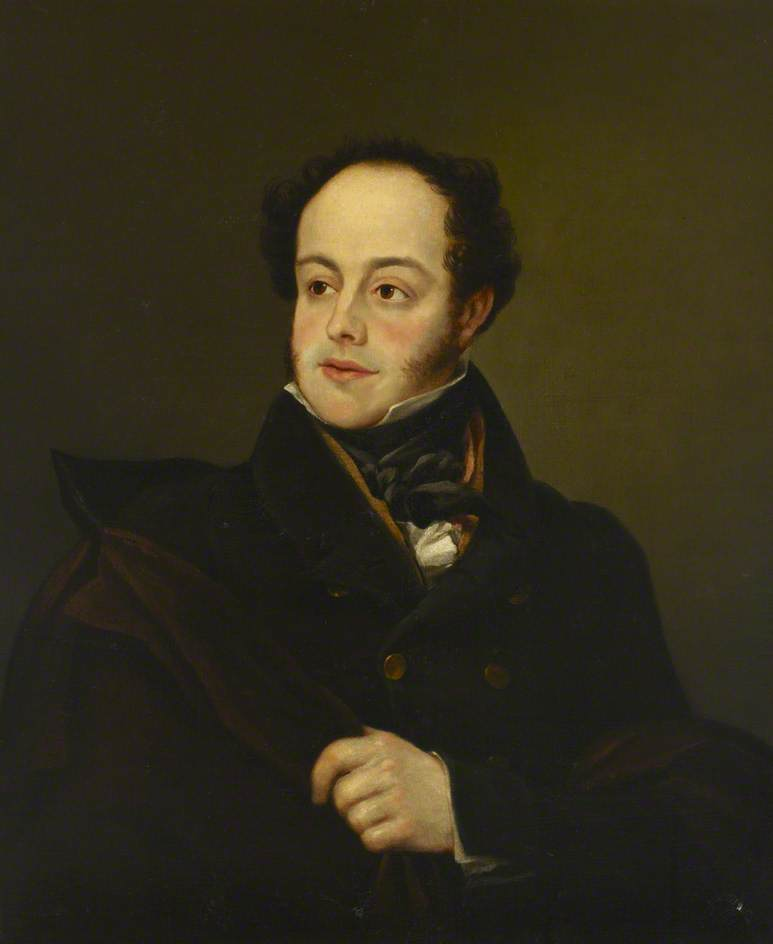
An image of Nicolas Mori by an unknown artist

Nicolas Mori (24 January 1796 – 14 June 1839) was an Anglo-Italian violinist, music publisher and conductor. Once regarded as the finest violinist in Europe, Mori was somewhat overshadowed by the rise of Paganini.

== Life ==
Born in London, the son of an Italian wigmaker, he was a child prodigy, performing at the age of 7 at the King's Theatre on 15 March 1804. He was later patronized by the Duke and Duchess of York and the Dukes of Sussex & Cambridge. He studied under Pinto until 1804, then with François Hippolyte Barthélémon and finally with Viotti from 1808 to 1814. He was one of the founders (with his tutor Viotti) of the Philharmonic Society in 1813.

In 1814, while still in the Philharmonic orchestra, he acted as one of the society's directors, and also became a member of the opera band. In 1816, he was appointed leader of the Philharmonic orchestra.

In 1819, Mori married the widow of the music publisher Lavenu, whose business he carried on at 28 New Bond Street, in conjunction with his stepson, Henry Louis Lavenu. It was in this capacity that he published for a few years, in collaboration with W. Ball, the excellent annual 'The Musical Gem,' and later, in 1837, after a keen competition with Novello, he issued Mendelssohn's Concerto in D Minor. From 1819 to 1826 he was the teacher of Dando, afterwards the eminent violinist.

In 1823, on the establishment of the now Royal Academy of Music, he was a member of the first board of professors, and thenceforward became one of the principal orchestral leaders of provincial festivals. In September and October 1824 he led the band at the Wakefield and Newcastle festivals, and in September 1825, in conjunction with Kieswetter and Loder, at the York festival. It was here that he had the bad taste to challenge comparison with Kieswetter, by playing Mayseder's Concerto No. 3 in D, which Kieswetter had chosen as his piece de resistance. A. contemporary critic says : 'The two artists are not comparable together. Mr. Mori excels in tone and vigour, Mr. Kieswetter in delicacy and feeling.'

In 1826 he led the band at the Covent Garden oratorios, and in 1827 succeeded Venua as leader of the Covent Garden opera band. In 1831, he became a member of the orchestra of the Concerts of Antient Music at the New Rooms, Hanover Square. From this time his public appearances were mainly restricted to his own concerts, which were generally held in May. At his concert in 1835 he cleared £800, and a similar sum in 1836, in which year he instituted a series of chamber music concerts, in continuation of those conducted by Blagrove, whom he virtually challenged by playing the same compositions.

He died on 18 June 1839, from the breaking of an aneurism, having been for some years the victim of a cerebral derangement which rendered him at times brusque, irritable, and violent. Immediately before his death he announced a concert whose programmes were headed by the grim device of a death's head and the legend Memento Mori.

== Assessment ==
As a performer 'Mori's attitude had the grace of manly confidence. His bow arm was bold, free, and commanding, and the tone he produced was eminently firm, full, and impressive. His execution was alike marked by abundant force and fire, by extraordinary precision and prodigious facility, but lacked niceties of finish and the graces and delicacies of expression' (Quarterly Mag. Music, iii. 323).

He left behind him a son, Francis Mori (1820-1873), the composer of a cantata, entitled 'Fridolin;' an operetta, with words by George Linley, entitled 'The River Sprite,' which was performed at Covent Garden on 9 Feb. 1865; many songs, and a series of vocal exercises. He died at Chamant, near Senlis, in France, on 2 August 1873.

== Family ==
He had 5 children with Eliza, the widow of music publisher Lewis Lavenu, finally marrying her on 24 January 1826 at St. Paul's, Covent Garden when Lavenu's business became known as Mori & Lavenu.
