= Thomas Forbes Walmisley =

Music artist

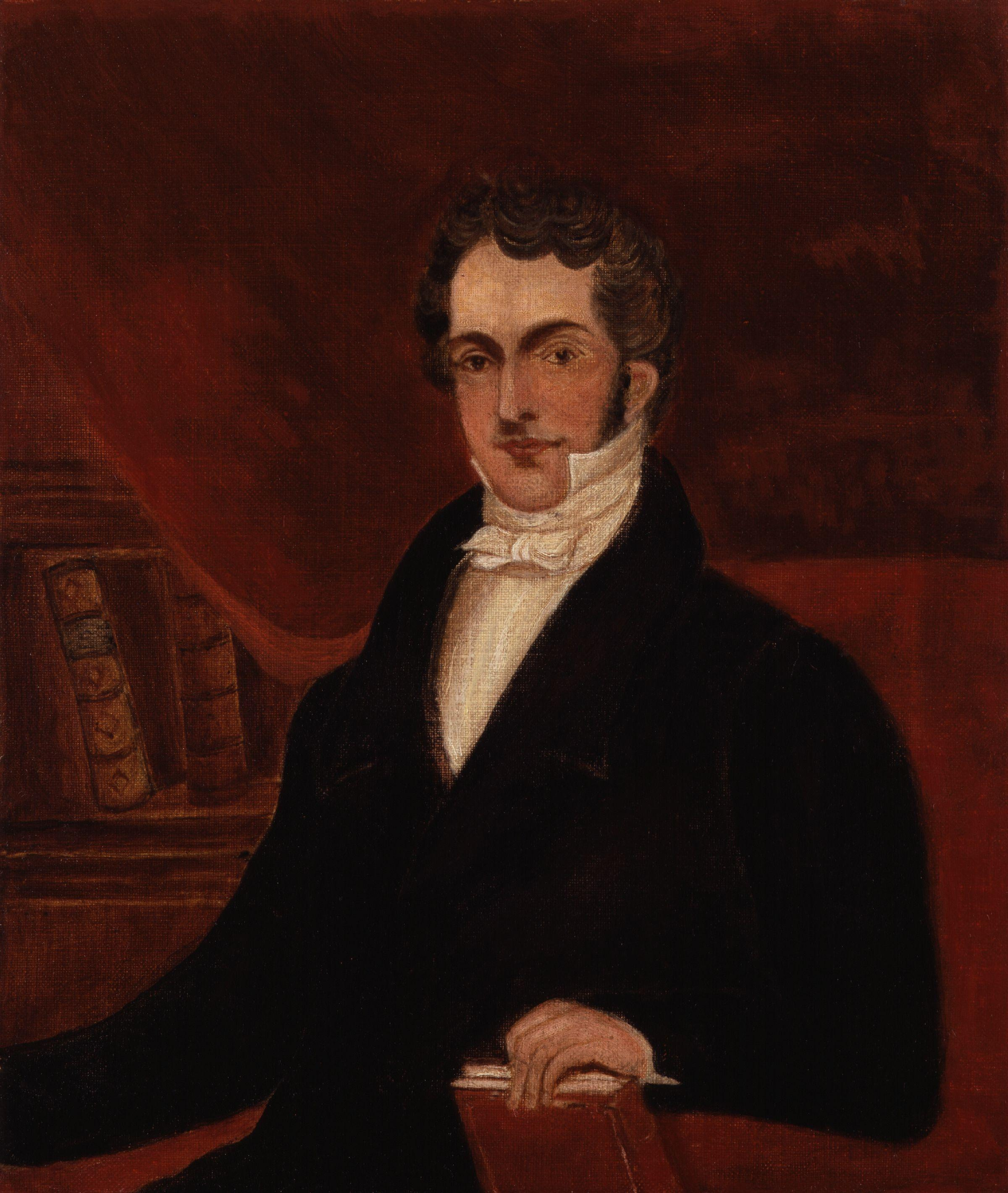
Thomas Forbes Walmisley

Thomas Forbes Walmisley (22 May 1783 – 10 July 1866) was an organist, and a composer of church music and of glees.

== Life ==
Walmisley was born in Westminster, London in 1783, the third son of William Walmisley, clerk of the papers to the House of Lords. He, like his brothers, was a chorister in Westminster Abbey, and he was educated at Westminster School from 1793 to 1798. In 1796 he sang in oratorios at Covent Garden.

He studied music under John Spencer and Thomas Attwood. From 1810 to 1814 he was assistant organist to the Female Orphan Asylum; in 1814 he succeeded Robert Cooke as organist of St Martin-in-the-Fields. He resigned, on a pension, in March 1854. He was elected a professional member of the Noblemen and Gentlemen's Catch Club in 1827. From 1803 he was a teacher of piano and singing, and became well known as a teacher; pupils included Edward John Hopkins.

In 1810 Walmisley married the eldest daughter of William Capon, an architectural draughtsman. His eldest son, of six sons and four daughters who survived infancy, was Thomas Attwood Walmisley (1814–1856), whose Cathedral Music he edited in 1857.

Walmisley died on 10 July 1866, and was buried in the family grave at Brompton Cemetery.

== Compositions ==
Walmisley composed more than fifty glees, four of which won prizes; he also composed anthems, and a morning and evening service. He published A Collection of Glees, Trios, Rounds and Canons (1826), Three Canons (1840) and Sacred Songs (1841).

His Six Glees were reviewed in October 1830: "We do not perceive in any one of them the semblance of an error, either in composition or in the manner of setting the words, and the parts are constructed with every possible regard to vocal convenience, as well as joint effect. The total absence, too, of all nonsensical pedantry... is another recommendation of them.... But we must also say... that we now and then meet with a cadence whose day is past.... On the other hand, the melodies are generally distinct and flowing, and not devoid of elegance...."
