= Argyll Rooms =

Coordinates: 51.5145°N 0.1411°W

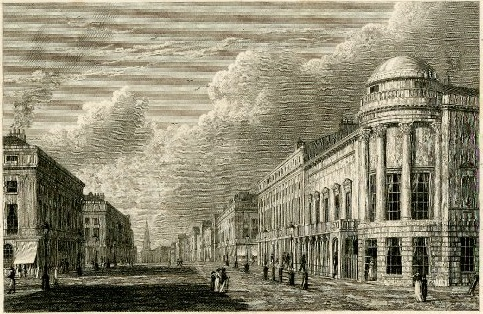
Engraving of Regent Street in 1825, with the Argyll Rooms on the right. Print made by Charles Heath, after William Westall.

The Argyll Rooms (sometimes spelled Argyle) was an entertainment venue on Little Argyll Street, Regent Street, London, England, opened in 1806. It was rebuilt in 1818 due to the design of Regent Street. It burned down in 1830, but was rebuilt, but later mainly occupied by shops. It was the home of the Philharmonic Society of London from its inception in 1813 until 1830. Spohr, Moscheles, Liszt and Mendelssohn made their first appearances in England at the rooms.

The Argyll Rooms should not be confused with the Argyle Subscription Rooms, later part of the London Trocadero. These rooms were open as a music hall from 1849 to 1878 and were notorious as a haven for prostitutes.

== History ==
Originally, the mansion of John Campbell, 2nd Duke of Argyll stood on the east side of King Street. In 1736, the centre part of the mansion was demolished to build Little Argyll Street, leaving only the recently constructed north and south wings. The north wing was subsequently occupied by Robert Raymond, 2nd Baron Raymond (1744–1757) and Lady Monoux (1757–71) before being bought by William Jolliffe (MP for Petersfield) for reputedly a low price.

At Jolliffe's death, his son Hylton sold the building to Lt.-Col. Henry Francis Greville for the low price of £70. Greville altered and added to it, and in 1806 opened it up as the "Argyll Rooms." The place was the site of the meetings of a fashionable association termed the Pic-Nics, which organised events including burlettas, vaudevilles and ballets on a small scale. In 1807, the Lord Chamberlain granted Greville an annual license to host music, dancing, burlettas, and dramatic performances at the Argyll Rooms. The license was renewed the next year, but afterwards, the license was confined to music and dancing. William Taylor, the manager of the King's Theatre in Haymarket, described the first two seasons this way:

"There was no Stage, beyond a small elevation for the Singers to stand upon, and … no more than four of these were employed in petit pices [sic] of one short Act merely introductory to assemblies and Balls, and … no Dancers were ever seen, confined alone to subscribers for only 12 nights the first year and but 8 the second and last experiment there, and … no money was even taken at the doors."

Greville went abroad in 1812 and had to hand over the Argyll Rooms to his debtor Stephen Slade. Slade ran the rooms for several years, letting them for concerts and other entertainments. During his management one of the events there was a reading by Sarah Siddons, on 10 February 1813, of Shakespeare's Macbeth, for the benefit of the widow of Andrew Cherry, dramatist and actor. In the same year the rooms were chosen by the new Philharmonic Society of London for performances; the Society may have chosen it because it was to be rebuilt as part of John Nash's plan for Regent Street. In this way, the Prince Regent could promote classical music and his own reputation.

In 1818, Slade was forced to sell by the Regent Street commissioners. Slade was awarded by a jury £23,000 as compensation (a sum considered high at the time), and the whole of the old building was removed and new rooms erected, on the east side of Regent Street at the north-west corner of Argyll Place. The new building was designed by Nash: on the side next Regent Street was a balcony supported by eight caryatids. The group by whom it was erected were 21 of the prominent London musicians in London, who had formed the Regent’s Harmonic Institution to publish music. This organisation occupied, for the purposes of its trade, the southwestern angle of the new building (at the corner of Regent Street and Argyll Place), circular with a domed roof. The cost of the building, with other factors, soon led to the withdrawal of most of the original investors, at a loss of about £1800 each, and the place eventually fell into the hands of two of them, Thomas Welsh and William Hawes. They then fell out, and ultimately Hawes, by an act of bankruptcy, forced a dissolution of the partnership, and the concern then remained in the hands of Welsh alone.

During the Philharmonic Society's tenure of the rooms (old and new), a period of about seventeen years, many events of great interest to musicians occurred there. There, on 6 March and 10 April 1820, Louis Spohr appeared, first as violinist and last as conductor, when a baton was used for perhaps the first time at an English concert. There also on 18 June 1820, at his benefit concert, his first wife (Dorette Scheidler) made her only appearance in England (and her last on earth) as a harpist. There, on 11 June 1821, Ignaz Moscheles made his first appearance in England. In 1823, the twelve-year-old Franz Liszt played there. On 21 March 1825, the British première of Beethoven's Symphony No. 9 (1824) was presented by the Philharmonic Society (who had commissioned it), conducted by Sir George Smart (and with the choral "Ode to Joy" sung in Italian). There too Carl Maria von Weber, on 3 April 1826, two months before his decease, conducted one of the Philharmonic Society's concerts. On 25 May 1829 the youthful Felix Mendelssohn gave his first concert in England, conducting, at one of the concerts of the Philharmonic Society, his Symphony No. 1, and a month later, at the benefit concert of Drouet, the flautist, on midsummer night, 24 June, produced for the first time in England his beautiful overture to A Midsummer Night's Dream.

Besides concerts, the rooms were let for miscellaneous performances and exhibitions. One of the most attractive of the latter was a French exhibition of dramas performed by puppets, called The French Theatre du Petit Lazary, which was given in 1828 and 1829. In 1829–1830 the rooms were tenanted by Ivan Chabert, calling himself "The Fire King," who entertained the public by entering a heated oven and cooking a steak in it, swallowing phosphorus, and so forth. During his tenure of the place, at 10 o'clock in the evening of 6 February 1830, a fire broke out, which in a short time completely destroyed the building. The primitive steam powered fire pumper designed by John Ericsson and made by Braithwaite & Ericsson was used at the fire. The fire was controlled.

The building was rebuilt, but never regained its former reputation. The Philharmonic concerts were removed after the fire to the concert-room of the King's Theatre, and thence to the Hanover Square Rooms, and although a few concerts and other entertainments were occasionally given in the Argyll Rooms the place became by degrees deserted by caterers for public amusement and was in the course of a few years converted into shops. In 1919 the shops were replaced by Dickins & Jones.

== Argyll Rooms as subject ==
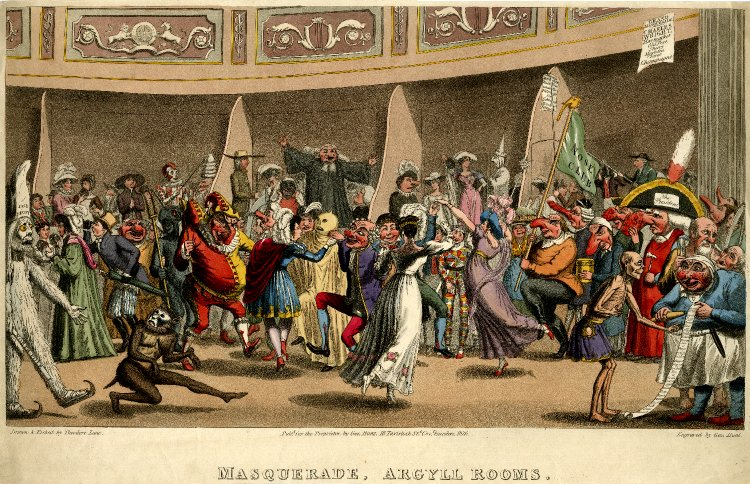
Etching by Theodore Lane of a masquerade in the Argyll Rooms

Lord Byron satirised the fashions of the Argyll Rooms in this passage of the English Bards and Scotch Reviewers (1809):

Or hail at once the patron and the pile
Of vice and folly, Greville and Argyle!
Where yon proud palace, Fashion's hallowed fane,
Spreads wide her portals for the motley train,
Behold the new Petronius of the day,
Our arbiter of pleasure and of play!
There the hired eunuch, the Hesperian choir,
The melting lute, the soft lascivious lyre,
The song from Italy, the step from France,
The midnight orgy, and the mazy dance,
The smile of beauty, and the flush of wine,
For fops, fools, gamesters, knaves, and Lords combine:
Each to his humour—Comus all allows;
Champaign, dice, music, or your neighbour's spouse.

The printmaker Theodore Lane etched the print Masquerade at the Argyll Rooms in 1826.
