= George Thomas Smart =

English musician, teacher and conductor (1776–1867)

Sir George Thomas Smart
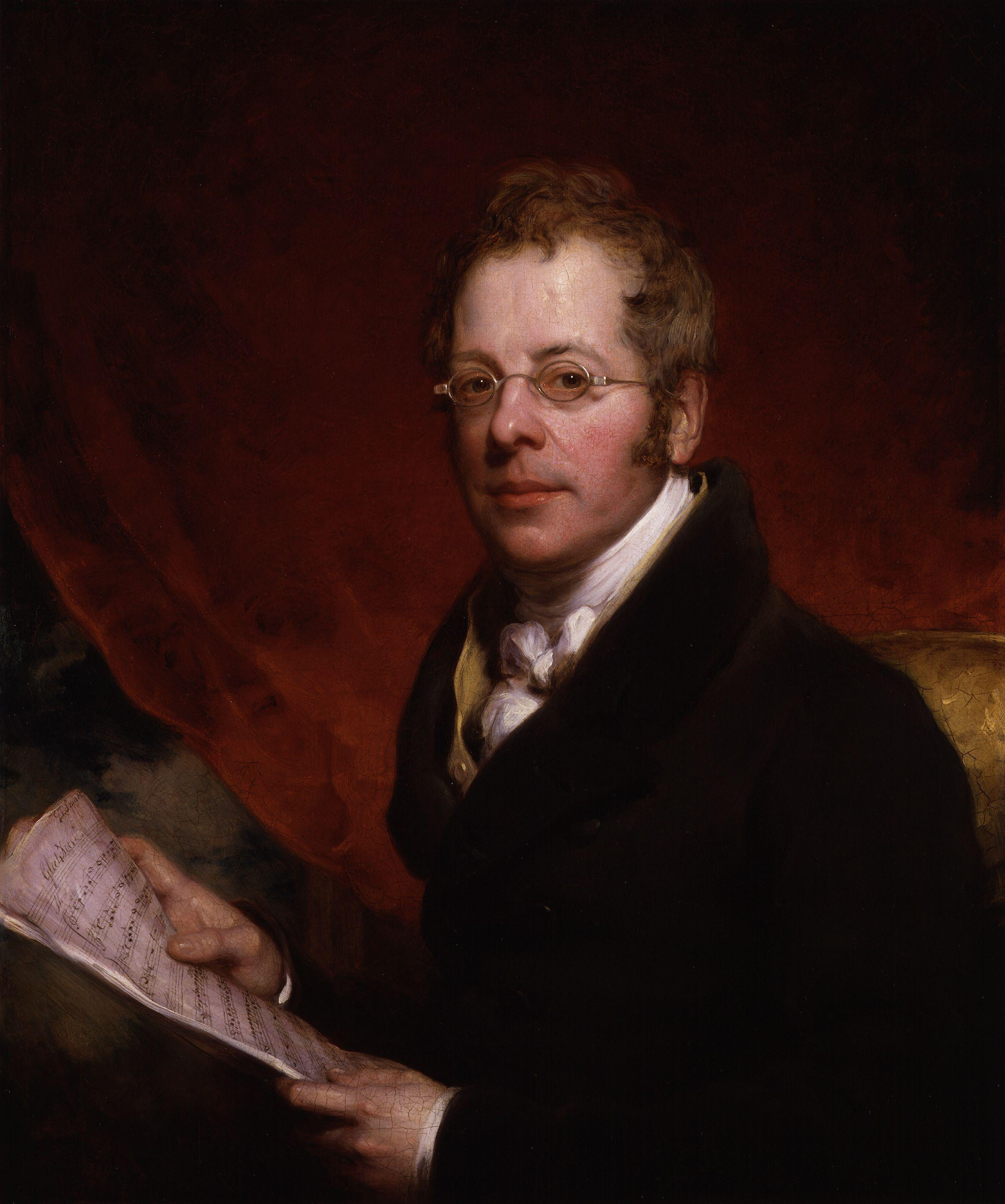
- Portrait of Smart by William Bradley
- Born: 10 May 1776; London, England
- Died: 23 February 1867 (aged 90)
- Burial place: Kensal Green Cemetery
- Occupations: Musician; music teacher; conductor
- Employers: Royal Academy of Music; Chapel Royal
- Style: Classical; church music
- Musical career
- Instruments: Violin; organ

Sir George Thomas Smart (10 May 1776 – 23 February 1867) was an English musician and music teacher.

Smart was born in London. His father was a music-seller.

He was a choirboy at the Chapel Royal and was educated in music, becoming a violinist, organist, teacher of singing and conductor. He taught for many years at the Royal Academy of Music, where his notable pupils included Elizabeth Greenfield, John Orlando Parry, Mary Shaw, and Willoughby Weiss. In 1811, he was knighted by the Duke of Richmond, Lord Lieutenant of Ireland, having conducted a number of successful concerts in Dublin. On 1 April 1822, he was appointed organist at the Chapel Royal.

From that time onwards, Smart was one of the chief musical leaders and organizers in England, directing the music for the opening of the Great Exhibition in 1851 and conducting at the Royal Philharmonic Society, the Covent Garden, and provincial festivals. In 1838, he was appointed composer to the Chapel Royal. He was a master of the Handelian traditions, was personally acquainted with Beethoven, and was a close friend of Weber, who died in his house. Some of his church music and glees became well known. He died in London and is buried in Kensal Green Cemetery.

His brother Henry (1778–1823), father of the composers Harriet Anne Smart and Henry Smart, was a well-known violinist.

Smart wrote a journal, Leaves from the Journals of Sir George Smart, which was published in 1907.
