= List of acts of the 4th session of the 47th Parliament of the United Kingdom =

This is a list of acts of the 4th session of the 47th Parliament of the United Kingdom, which ran from 3 November 1977 until 24 October 1978.

Acts passed since 1963 are cited by calendar year, as opposed to the convention used for earlier acts of citing the regnal year(s) in which the relevant parliamentary session was held. Each act passed in a respective year is given a chapter number (abbreviated "c."), denoted by Arabic numerals in the case of public general acts, lowercase Roman numerals in the case of local acts, or italicised Arabic numerals in the case of personal acts. These run as separate series.

80 acts of Parliament were passed by the 47th Parliament in its 4th session: 60 public general acts and 20 local acts.

indicates that an act is available to view at legislation.gov.uk, and indicates the location of the original act in the Parliamentary Archives.

== Public general acts ==
{{legislationuk|act |- | {{|Pensioners Payments Act 1977|public|51|24-11-1977|An Act to make provision for lump sum payments to pensioners, and for connected purposes.}} |- | {{|Consolidated Fund (No. 2) Act 1977|public|52|15-12-1977|An Act to apply certain sums out of the Consolidated Fund to the service of the years ending on 31st March 1978 and 1979.}} |- | {{|Finance (Income Tax Reliefs) Act 1977|public|53|15-12-1977|An Act to make further increases in the personal reliefs referred to in section 22(1)(a), (b) and (c) and (3) of the Finance Act 1977 and to exempt from income tax for the year 1977–78 any general increase taking effect in that year in social security and other pensions and allowances.}} |- | {{|Participation Agreements Act 1978|public|1|23-02-1978|maintained=y|An Act to exclude the application of the Restrictive Trade Practices Act 1976 in relation to certain agreements; and for connected purposes.}} |- | {{|Commonwealth Development Corporation Act 1978|public|2|23-03-1978|maintained=y|An Act to consolidate the enactments relating to the Commonwealth Development Corporation with corrections and minor improvements made under the Consolidation of Enactments (Procedure) Act 1949.}} |- | {{|Refuse Disposal (Amenity) Act 1978|public|3|23-03-1978|maintained=y|An Act to consolidate certain enactments relating to abandoned vehicles and other refuse.}} |- | {{|Local Government (Scotland) Act 1978|public|4|23-03-1978|maintained=y|An Act to amend the law relating to the valuation and rating of lands and heritages in Scotland occupied by certain public utilities and bodies and by certain undertakings; to make further provision with respect to payments to the Commissioner for Local Administration in Scotland and his officers; to postpone the repeal of the Burgh Police (Scotland) Acts 1892 to 1911 and of certain local statutory provisions; to make minor amendments to the Countryside (Scotland) Act 1967 and the Local Government (Scotland) Act 1973; and for connected purposes.}} |- | {{|Northern Ireland (Emergency Provisions) Act 1978|public|5|23-03-1978|maintained=y|An Act to consolidate, with certain exceptions, the Northern Ireland (Emergency Provisions) Act 1973, the Northern Ireland (Young Persons) Act 1974 and the Northern Ireland (Emergency Provisions) (Amendment) Act 1975.}} |- | {{|Employment Subsidies Act 1978|public|6|23-03-1978|maintained=y|An Act to authorise payments to employers as a means of contributing to the alleviation of unemployment.}} |- | {{|Consolidated Fund Act 1978|public|7|23-03-1978|An Act to apply certain sums out of the Consolidated Fund to the service of the years ending on 31st March 1977 and 1978.}} |- | {{|Civil Aviation Act 1978|public|8|23-03-1978|maintained=y|An Act to establish a fund from which payments may be made in respect of expenses incurred for the purpose of protecting aircraft, aerodromes or air navigation installations against acts of violence or in connection with the policing of airports; to amend the law relating to the Civil Aviation Authority and the British Airways Board; to amend the law relating to noise, vibration and atmospheric pollution caused by aircraft; and otherwise to amend the law relating to aerodromes, aircraft and civil aviation; and for connected purposes.}} |- | {{|Gun Barrel Proof Act 1978|public|9|05-05-1978|maintained=y|An Act to make provision to enable the United Kingdom to accede to a Convention for the Reciprocal Recognition of Proof Marks of Small Arms done at Brussels on 1st July 1969; to amend the Gun Barrel Proof Act 1868; to extend that Act and the Gun Barrel Proof Act 1950 to Scotland and Northern Ireland; and for purposes connected with the matters aforesaid.}} |- | {{|European Assembly Elections Act 1978|public|10|05-05-1978|maintained=y|An Act to make provision for and in connection with the election of representatives to the Assembly of the European Communities, and to prevent any treaty providing for any increase in the powers of the Assembly from being ratified by the United Kingdom unless approved by Act of Parliament.}} |- | {{|Shipbuilding (Redundancy Payments) Act 1978|public|11|05-05-1978|maintained=y|An Act to provide for the making of supplementary payments to or in respect of employees of certain shipbuilding and other companies in respect of redundancy or transfer to less well-paid employment.}} |- | {{|Medical Act 1978|public|12|05-05-1978|An Act to make provision for the constitution and functions of the General Medical Council and certain committees of the Council and to amend or provide for the amendment of the Medical Acts with respect to medical education, the registration of medical practitioners and their professional conduct and fitness to practise; and for purposes connected with those matters.}} |- | {{|Education (Northern Ireland) Act 1978|public|13|25-05-1978|An Act to facilitate the establishment in Northern Ireland of schools likely to be attended by pupils of different religious affiliations or cultural traditions.}} |- | {{|Housing (Financial Provisions) (Scotland) Act 1978|public|14|25-05-1978|maintained=y|An Act to make new provision for Scotland with respect to grants for housing authorities and grants and loans to voluntary organisations concerned with housing; to provide for grants and loans by local authorities to meet expenses of repairing houses in a state of disrepair; to make further provision for the improvement of houses below the tolerable standard; to make further provision as to the rents of houses provided by local authorities in Scotland; and to make minor amendments of certain enactments relating to housing.}} |- | {{|Solomon Islands Act 1978|public|15|25-05-1978|maintained=y|An Act to make provision for, and in connection with, the attainment by Solomon Islands of independence within the Commonwealth.}} |- | {{|Trustee Savings Banks Act 1978|public|16|30-06-1978|An Act to clarify and amend the law with respect to investment and borrowing by trustee savings banks.}} |- | {{|Internationally Protected Persons Act 1978|public|17|30-06-1978|maintained=y|An Act to implement the Convention on the Prevention and Punishment of Crimes against Internationally Protected Persons adopted by the United Nations General Assembly in 1973.}} |- | {{|Export Guarantees and Overseas Investment Act 1978|public|18|30-06-1978|maintained=y|An Act to consolidate the Export Guarantees Act 1975, (as amended by section 4 of the International Finance, Trade and Aid Act 1977 and Schedule 1 to that Act), and sections 1 and 2 of the Overseas Investment and Export Guarantees Act 1972.}} |- | {{|Oaths Act 1978|public|19|30-06-1978|maintained=y|An Act to consolidate the Oaths Act 1838 and the Oaths Acts 1888 to 1977, and to repeal, as obsolete, section 13 of the Circuit Courts (Scotland) Act 1828.}} |- | {{|Tuvalu Act 1978|public|20|30-06-1978|maintained=y|An Act to make provision for, and in connection with, the attainment by Tuvalu of independence within the Commonwealth.}} |- | {{|Co-operative Development Agency Act 1978|public|21|30-06-1978|An Act to establish a Co-operative Development Agency; and for connected purposes.}} |- | {{|Domestic Proceedings and Magistrates' Courts Act 1978|public|22|30-06-1978|maintained=y|An Act to make fresh provision for matrimonial proceedings in magistrates' courts; to amend enactments relating to other proceedings so as to eliminate certain differences between the law relating to those proceedings and the law relating to matrimonial proceedings in magistrates' courts; to extend section 15 of the Justices of the Peace Act 1949; to amend Part II of the Magistrates' Courts Act 1952; to amend section 2 of the Administration of Justice Act 1964; to amend the Maintenance Orders (Reciprocal Enforcement) Act 1972; to amend certain enactments relating to adoption; and for purposes connected with those matters.}} |- | {{|Judicature (Northern Ireland) Act 1978|public|23|30-06-1978|maintained=y|An Act to make provision with respect to the constitution, jurisdiction and proceedings of the Supreme Court of Judicature (Note: Although the term "Supreme Court of Judicature" was amended to "Court of Judicature" in each place it occurs in the Act by the Constitutional Reform Act 2005 on 1 October 2009, the long title was exempted from amendment.) of Northern Ireland; to establish as part of that Court a Crown Court to try indictments and exercise other jurisdiction in Northern Ireland in relation to criminal cases and to abolish courts of assize there and deal with their jurisdiction; to make, as respects Northern Ireland, provision for the administration of courts; to provide for certain rules of law in judicial matters in Northern Ireland and to amend the law regarding county courts, magistrates' courts and justices of the peace in Northern Ireland and otherwise with respect to the administration of justice there.}} |- | {{|Theatres Trust (Scotland) Act 1978|public|24|30-06-1978|maintained=y|An Act to extend the Theatres Trust Act 1976 to Scotland.}} |- | {{|Nuclear Safeguards and Electricity (Finance) Act 1978|public|25|30-06-1978|maintained=y|An Act to make provision for giving effect to an International Agreement for the application of Safeguards in the United Kingdom in connection with the Treaty on the Non-Proliferation of Nuclear Weapons; and to authorise contributions by the Secretary of State to expenditure by the Central Electricity Generating Board in connection with the construction of the second stage of the Board's generating station at Drax.}} |- | {{|Suppression of Terrorism Act 1978|public|26|30-06-1978|maintained=y|An Act to give effect to the European Convention on the Suppression of Terrorism; to amend the law relating to the extradition of criminals and the obtaining of evidence for criminal proceedings outside the United Kingdom; to confer jurisdiction in respect of certain offences committed outside the United Kingdom; and for connected purposes.}} |- | {{|Home Purchase Assistance and Housing Corporation Guarantee Act 1978|public|27|30-06-1978|An Act to authorise the use of public money for assisting first-time purchasers of house property, and for connected purposes; and to increase the financial limit governing the Housing Corporation's power to guarantee loans to housing associations and others.}} |- | {{|Adoption (Scotland) Act 1978|public|28|20-07-1978|maintained=y|An Act to consolidate the enactments relating to adoption in Scotland with amendments to give effect to recommendations of the Scottish Law Commission.}} |- | {{|National Health Service (Scotland) Act 1978|public|29|20-07-1978|maintained=y|An Act to consolidate certain enactments relating to the national health service in Scotland.}} |- | {{|Interpretation Act 1978|public|30|20-07-1978|maintained=y|An Act to consolidate the Interpretation Act 1889 and certain other enactments relating to the construction and operation of Acts of Parliament and other instruments, with amendments to give effect to recommendations of the Law Commission and the Scottish Law Commission.}} |- | {{|Theft Act 1978|public|31|20-07-1978|maintained=y|An Act to replace section 16(2)(a) of the Theft Act 1968 with other provision against fraudulent conduct; and for connected purposes.}} |- | {{|Representation of the People Act 1978|public|32|20-07-1978|An Act to increase the limits on candidates' election expenses at parliamentary elections and to enable the Secretary of State by order to vary the limits on candidates' election expenses at parliamentary and other elections.}} |- | {{|State Immunity Act 1978|public|33|20-07-1978|maintained=y|An Act to make new provision with respect to proceedings in the United Kingdom by or against other States; to provide for the effect of judgments given against the United Kingdom in the courts of States parties to the European Convention on State Immunity; to make new provision with respect to the immunities and privileges of heads of State; and for connected purposes.}} |- | {{|Industrial and Provident Societies Act 1978|public|34|20-07-1978|maintained=y|An Act to raise the amounts of deposits which an industrial and provident society may take without thereby carrying on the business of banking; and to authorise the further alteration of those amounts from time to time.}} |- | {{|Import of Live Fish (Scotland) Act 1978|public|35|20-07-1978|maintained=y|An Act to restrict in Scotland the import, keeping or release of live fish or shellfish or the live eggs or milt of fish or shellfish of certain species.}} |- | {{|House of Commons (Administration) Act 1978|public|36|20-07-1978|maintained=y|An Act to make further provision for the administration of the House of Commons.}} |- | {{|Protection of Children Act 1978|public|37|20-07-1978|maintained=y|An Act to prevent the exploitation of children by making indecent photographs of them; and to penalise the distribution, showing and advertisement of such indecent photographs.}} |- | {{|Consumer Safety Act 1978|public|38|20-07-1978|maintained=y|An Act to make further provision with respect to the safety of consumers and others.}} |- | {{|Local Government Act 1978|public|39|20-07-1978|maintained=y|An Act to amend the Local Government Act 1974 with respect to investigations by Local Commissioners and the Local Government (Scotland) Act 1975 with respect to investigations by the Commissioner for Local Administration in Scotland; and for purposes connected therewith.}} |- | {{|Rating (Disabled Persons) Act 1978|public|40|20-07-1978|maintained=y|An Act to amend the law relating to relief from rates in respect of premises used by disabled persons and invalids; and for purposes connected therewith.}} |- | {{|Iron and Steel (Amendment) Act 1978|public|41|20-07-1978|An Act to increase the limit on the aggregate of sums borrowed by, or paid by the Secretary of State to, the British Steel Corporation and sums borrowed by the publicly-owned companies.}} |- | {{|Finance Act 1978|public|42|31-07-1978|maintained=y|An Act to grant certain duties, to alter other duties, and to amend the law relating to the National Debt and the Public Revenue, and to make further provision in connection with Finance.}} |- | {{|Independent Broadcasting Authority Act 1978|public|43|31-07-1978|An Act to extend until 31st December 1981 the period during which television and local sound broadcasting services are to be provided by the Independent Broadcasting Authority and to exclude section 4(2) and (5) of the Independent Broadcasting Authority Act 1973 in relation to proceedings in Parliament and proceedings of local authorities and committees and joint committees of local authorities.}} |- | {{|Employment Protection (Consolidation) Act 1978|public|44|31-07-1978|maintained=y|An Act to consolidate certain enactments relating to rights of employees arising out of their employment; and certain enactments relating to the insolvency of employers; to industrial tribunals; to recoupment of certain benefits; to conciliation officers; and to the Employment Appeal Tribunal.}} |- | {{|Statute Law (Repeals) Act 1978|public|45|31-07-1978|maintained=y|An Act to promote the reform of the statute law by the repeal, in accordance with recommendations of the Law Commission and the Scottish Law Commission, of certain enactments which (except in so far as their effect is preserved) are no longer of practical utility; and to facilitate the citation of statutes.}} |- | {{|Employment (Continental Shelf) Act 1978|public|46|31-07-1978|maintained=y|An Act to make provision for the application of certain enactments to employment connected with the exploration or exploitation of areas of the continental shelf adjacent to areas designated under the Continental Shelf Act 1964.}} |- | {{|Civil Liability (Contribution) Act 1978|public|47|31-07-1978|maintained=y|An Act to make new provision for contribution between persons who are jointly or severally, or both jointly and severally, liable for the same damage and in certain other similar cases where two or more persons have paid or may be required to pay compensation for the same damage; and to amend the law relating to proceedings against persons jointly liable for the same debt or jointly or severally, or both jointly and severally, liable for the same damage.}} |- | {{|Homes Insulation Act 1978|public|48|31-07-1978|An Act to provide for local authority grants towards the thermal insulation of dwellings.}} |- | {{|Community Service by Offenders (Scotland) Act 1978|public|49|31-07-1978|maintained=y|An Act to make provision as respects the performance of unpaid work by persons convicted or placed on probation in Scotland; and for connected purposes.}} |- | {{|Inner Urban Areas Act 1978|public|50|31-07-1978|maintained=y|An Act to make provision as respects inner urban areas in Great Britain in which there exists special social need; to amend section 8 of the Local Employment Act 1972; and for connected purposes.}} |- | {{|Scotland Act 1978|public|51|31-07-1978|maintained=y|An Act to provide for changes in the government of Scotland and in the procedure of Parliament and in the constitution and functions of certain public bodies.}} |- | {{|Wales Act 1978|public|52|31-07-1978|maintained=y|An Act to provide for changes in the government of Wales and in the constitution and functions of certain public bodies.}} |- | {{|Chronically Sick and Disabled Persons (Northern Ireland) Act 1978|public|53|31-07-1978|maintained=y|An Act to make further provision with respect to the welfare of chronically sick and disabled persons in Northern Ireland; and for connected purposes.}} |- | {{|Dividends Act 1978|public|54|31-07-1978|An Act to provide for section 10 of the Counter-Inflation Act 1973 to continue in force until the end of July 1979.}} |- | {{|Transport Act 1978|public|55|02-08-1978|maintained=y|An Act to provide for the planning and development of public passenger transport services in the counties of England and Wales; to make further provision about public service vehicle licensing, the regulation of goods vehicles and parking and about inland waterway transport; to make amendments about British Rail and railways, and about Freightliners Limited and the finances of the National Freight Corporation and other transport bodies in the public sector; and for purposes connected with those matters.}} |- | {{|Parliamentary Pensions Act 1978|public|56|02-08-1978|An Act to make further provision with respect to the contributory pensions schemes for Members of the House of Commons and for the holders of certain Ministerial and other offices.}} |- | {{|Appropriation Act 1978|public|57|02-08-1978|An Act to apply a sum out of the Consolidated Fund to the service of the year ending on 31st March 1979, to appropriate the supplies granted in this Session of Parliament, and to repeal certain Consolidated Fund and Appropriation Acts.}} }}

== Local acts ==
{{legislationuk|act |- | {{|Aberdeen Shoemakers Incorporation Order Confirmation Act 1977|local|21|24-11-1977|An Act to confirm a Provisional Order under the Private Legislation Procedure (Scotland) Act 1936, relating to Aberdeen Shoemakers Incorporation.|po1=Aberdeen Shoemakers Incorporation Order 1977|Provisional Order to amend the Aberdeen Shoemakers Incorporation Act 1854; and for purposes connected therewith.}} |- | {{|City of Glasgow District Council Order Confirmation Act 1977|local|22|24-11-1977|An Act to confirm a Provisional Order under the Private Legislation Procedure (Scotland) Act 1936, relating to City of Glasgow District Council.|po1=City of Glasgow District Council Order 1977|Provisional Order to confer powers on the City of Glasgow District Council with respect to stray dogs; and for other purposes.}} |- | {{|Atholl Investments (Aberdeen Development) Order Confirmation Act 1977|local|23|15-12-1977|An Act to confirm a Provisional Order under the Private Legislation Procedure (Scotland) Act 1936, relating to Atholl Investments (Aberdeen Development).|po1=Atholl Investments (Aberdeen Development) Order 1977|Provisional Order to authorise Atholl Investments (Scotland) Limited to construct buildings or structures bridging over The Green, Denburn Road, College Street and Windmill Brae in the district of the City of Aberdeen; and for other purposes.}} |- | {{|Church of Scotland (Property and Endowments) Amendment Order Confirmation Act 1978|local|1|23-03-1978|An Act to confirm a Provisional Order under the Private Legislation Procedure (Scotland) Act 1936, relating to Church of Scotland (Property and Endowments) Amendment.|po1=Church of Scotland (Property and Endowments) Amendment Order 1978|Provisional Order to amend the Church of Scotland (Property and Endowments) Act 1925 and the Church of Scotland (Property and Endowments) Amendment Act 1933 so as to empower the General Assembly of the Church of Scotland to delegate certain powers with regard to the holding and disposal of property and endowments; to authorise the General Assembly to delegate certain powers with respect to schemes and for purposes connected therewith.}} |- | {{|University of London Act 1978|local|2|23-03-1978|An Act to make new provision for the University of London and to repeal the University of London Act 1926.}} |- | {{|Customs Annuity and Benevolent Fund Act 1978|local|3|23-03-1978|An Act to extend the benefits of the Customs Annuity and Benevolent Fund; and for other purposes.}} |- | {{|Orkney Islands Council Order Confirmation Act 1978|local|4|25-05-1978|An Act to confirm a Provisional Order under the Private Legislation Procedure (Scotland) Act 1936, relating to Orkney Islands Council.|po1=Orkney Islands Council Order 1978|Provisional Order to extend the provisions of the Orkney County Council Act 1974 to certain piers and harbours in the Orkney Islands Area; to confer further powers on the Orkney Islands Council in relation to harbour matters; to repeal certain enactments relating to piers and harbours in the said Area; and for other purposes.}} |- | {{|Union Theological College of the Presbyterian Church in Ireland Act 1978|local|5|30-06-1978|An Act to provide for the establishment of The Union Theological College of the Presbyterian Church in Ireland; to declare the trusts upon which the property of The Union Theological College of the Presbyterian Church in Ireland shall be held; to make provision for the management and operation of The Union Theological College of the Presbyterian Church in Ireland; to provide for the transfer of the assets and liabilities of The Presbyterian College, Belfast, and the Magee Theological College, Londonderry, to the Trustees of The Union Theological College of the Presbyterian Church in Ireland; and for other purposes.}} |- | {{|Abingdon Market Place Act 1978|local|6|30-06-1978|An Act to make provision for the regulation and protection of Abingdon Market Place; and for other purposes.}} |- | {{|Mile End Gardens (Portsmouth) Act 1978|local|7|30-06-1978|An Act to remove restrictions attaching to Mile End Gardens, Portsmouth and authorise the use of the said lands for harbour development; and for other purposes.}} |- | {{|Commons Registration (Cardiganshire) Act 1978|local|8|30-06-1978|An Act to make provision for the reconstitution and validation of the register of common land maintained under the Commons Registration Act 1965 for the former county of Cardigan; and for other purposes.}} |- | {{|Christ Church Woburn Square and Saint Matthew Oakley Square Act 1978|local|9|30-06-1978|An Act to authorise the development and disposal of lands comprising the site of Christ Church Woburn Square and of the churchyard appurtenant thereto and of the churchyard of the former church of Saint Matthew Oakley Square; to authorise the erection of buildings thereon; and for connected purposes.}} |- | {{|Greater London Council (Money) Act 1978|local|10|20-07-1978|An Act to regulate the expenditure on capital account and on lending to other persons by the Greater London Council during the financial period from 1st April 1978 to 30th September 1979; and for other purposes.}} |- | {{|Kendal Market Act 1978|local|11|20-07-1978|An Act to make provision for the regulation and management of Kendal Market; and for other purposes.}} |- | {{|King's College London Act 1978|local|12|20-07-1978|An Act to unite that part of the University of London known as University of London King's College with the Corporation of King's College London; to transfer certain functions, rights, properties and liabilities from the University to the Corporation; to provide for the pooling of investments and moneys of certain funds of the Corporation; and for connected or other purposes.}} |- | {{|Greater London Council (General Powers) Act 1978|local|13|20-07-1978|An Act to confer further powers upon the Greater London Council and other authorities; and for other purposes.}} |- | {{|British Transport Docks Act 1978|local|14|20-07-1978|An Act to empower the British Transport Docks Board to construct works and to acquire lands; to confer further powers on the Board; and for other purposes.}} |- | {{|London Transport Act 1978|local|15|31-07-1978|An Act to empower the London Transport Executive to construct works and to acquire lands; to extend the time for the compulsory purchase of certain lands; to confer further powers on the Executive; and for other purposes.}} |- | {{|Greater London Council (General Powers) (No. 2) Act 1978|local|16|31-07-1978|An Act to confer further powers upon the Greater London Council and other authorities; and for other purposes.}} |- | {{|Vale of Glamorgan (Barry Harbour) Act 1978|local|17|31-07-1978|An Act to confer powers on the Vale of Glamorgan Borough Council as the harbour authority for Barry Harbour; for the provision of facilities within the harbour; for the regulation of navigation therein; and for connected purposes.}} }}
