= Joseph Richards =

Joseph Richards may refer to:

- Joseph Richards (rugby) (1868–?), rugby union footballer of the 1890s
- Joseph Richards (politician), representative to the Massachusetts Great and General Court
- Sir Joseph Richards, 3rd baronet (died 1738) of the Richards baronets
- Joseph John Richards (1878–1956), composer, conductor and music educator
- J. Havens Richards (1851–1923), Roman Catholic priest
- Joseph Loscombe Richards (1798–1854), Oxford college head

== See also ==
- Joe Richards (disambiguation)
- Joseph Richard (disambiguation)
