= Jo Richards =

Jo Richards may refer to:

- Jo Richards (naval architect) of Laser Pico and other boats
- Jo Richards, character in Boogie Woogie (film)
- Jo Richards (gymnastics coach) of Allana Slater

== See also ==
- Jo-Anne Richards, South African journalist and author
- Josephine Richards (disambiguation)
- Joe Richards (disambiguation)
