= Joe Richards (disambiguation) =

Joe Richards (born 1999) is an Australian rules footballer.

Joe Richards may also refer to:

- Joe Richards, cellist on The Divine Comedy album Casanova
- Maynard "Joe" Richards, owner of Cherry Patch Ranch brothels
- Joe Richards, president of the Football League, 1957–1966
- Joe Richards, actor in The Wild Ride
- Joe Richards, British parliamentary candidate, for Hackney North and Stoke Newington, 2017, and Southampton Test, 2019

== See also ==
- Joseph Richards (disambiguation)
- Jo Richards (disambiguation)
