= Joseph Richard =

Joseph Richard may refer to:

- Joseph-Adolphe Richard (1887–1964), Canadian politician
- Joseph Henri Maurice Richard, Canadian ice hockey player

== See also ==
- Joseph Richards (disambiguation)
