= Josephine Richards =

Josephine or Josie Richards may refer to:

- Josephine Richards (Mormon), Mormon leader and suffragist
- Josephine Richards, author of "A Halloween Story" in For a Few Stories More
- Josie Richards, Miss Trinidad and Tobago Universe

== See also ==
- Jo Richards (disambiguation)
