= Jeremy Clarke (poet) =

British-born poet

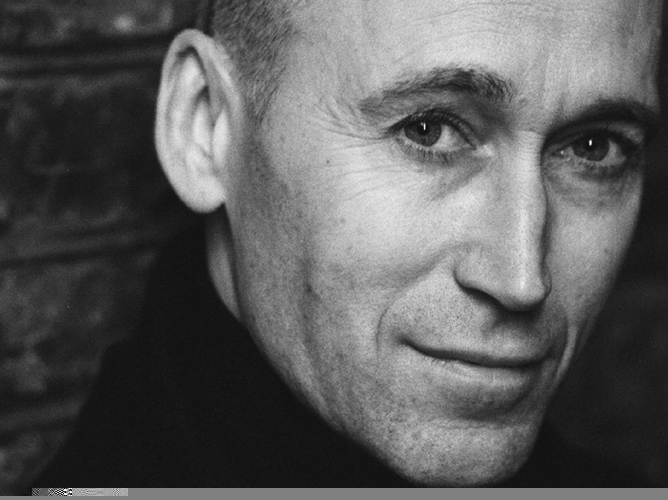
- Born: 5 February 1962 (age 64); Hitchin, Herts, England
- Occupation: Poet

Jeremy Clarke (born 5 February 1962) is a British poet.

== Career ==
Clarke's debut collection, Devon Hymns (2010), featured artwork by John Berger and Yves Berger. A limited edition chapbook, Incidents of Travel, and Common Prayer (pamphlet) were published in 2012. His second full collection, Spatiamentum, was published in 2014 (illustrations by Italian artist Paola Volpato). All titles were published by Rufus Books, Toronto. An illustrated booklet, Cathedral, was privately printed in 2017. A third collection, Psalms in the Vulgar Tongue, was published by Wounded Wolf Press (Ankara, Turkey) in 2018. Bread of Broken Ground was privately printed in 2020.

Clarke has collaborated with British sculptor Emily Young on a work in stone for St Pancras Old Church in London. The stone, a polished block of Carrara marble, is inscribed with an extract from Clarke's poem Praise. It reads: 'And I am here / in a place beyond desire / or fear'. It was unveiled in 2009.

Clarke participated in the exhibition Works on Paper (Crypt Gallery, London, 1–14 September 2014), showing 20 framed psalms (taken from his collection Psalms in the Vulgar Tongue). Each piece is a handwritten manuscript in brown ink on stained wood with original poem.

In 2016, a 'psalm card' artwork was permanently installed in the Church of St Anselm and St Cecilia, Lincoln's Inn Fields, London.

Also in 2016 a series of artworks was created under the title Host. Each one is an original text printed on a large watercolour sheet left for one winter on a London rooftop. They are held in both public and private collections.

A Spanish stonemason asks: when is a stone properly placed? And he answers his own question: when my impatience to once more readjust it has vanished. Jeremy Clarke writes like a Spanish stonemason. His poems are houses, bridges, towers...

John Berger

In 2018 a very large book, Fallen, was produced by Walter Newbury Ltd, London. Arranged in four sections, the book contains 16 poems (from Psalms in the Vulgar Tongue) and 20 original artworks by Clarke (watercolour sheets marked purely by a season's weather). Housed in a strapped box, it measures 70 x 90 cm and weighs 30 kg. Made entirely by hand, it is the largest book ever made by the company. The item permanently resides at Eton College Library (Modern Collections).

Also in 2018, a framed psalm artwork was permanently installed at Notre Dame de France, Leicester Square, London.

Being a thoughtful person is a very special thing it seems to me. To think, to feel and then to tell of what we felt and thought, in poetic form, is truly the work of the poet. But to speak about silence, to speak of the fullness of emptiness and the beauties, the subtleties of stillness in the presence of power, this is rare. Jeremy Clarke does this with humility and grace; a timeless watching and working into being human on Earth, a telling of that, a revealing for the rest of us who don't have the words. He's blessed, really.

Emily Young

In 2020, Stations, an artwork interpreting the Stations of the Cross in six clear cast acrylic blocks was completed. It was first exhibited at Notre Dame de France.

In John Berger's novel From A to X (2008) Clarke appears as the character Hasan, a street sweeper and poet, living alone in a spare, unfurnished room.

Clarke's long poem Music for Amen appeared in the anthology The Long White Thread of Words: Poems for John Berger (Smokestack Books, 2016).

His most recent publication, Stone Hours (Rufus Books, 2024), is both a collected work and a singular vision. It includes everything that Clarke has written to date (with the exception of Devon Hymns and Incidents of Travel). In a variety of poems and prose poems written over twenty years, it offers both a new Christian liturgy and reimagines certain Biblical texts and sacraments. Indeed, it collapses the distinction between church and world. It refuses the given status quo of the church in the world, proposing instead that 'the church is outside'. It is not an abandonment or rejection of the church or its practices, but an extension of the possibilities for engagement with the activities of the Divine.

A limited edition chapbook, The Last Stone, a supplement to Stone Hours, will be published in Spring 2027.

Jeremy Clarke was Poet in Residence at Eton College from 2010 to 2020. His archive is held in the Eton College Collections.

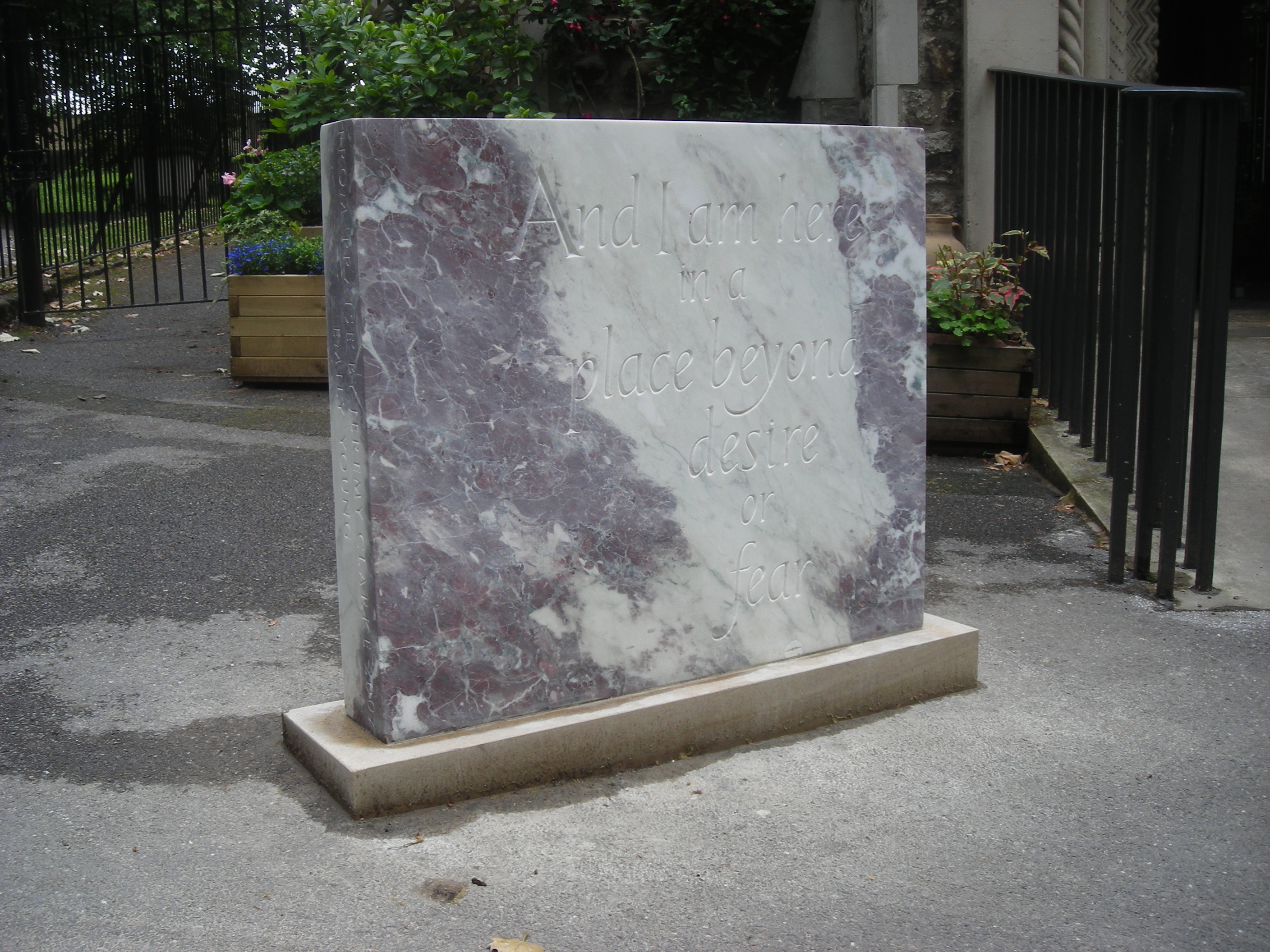
The Stone Installation by Jeremy Clarke and Emily Young. Front view

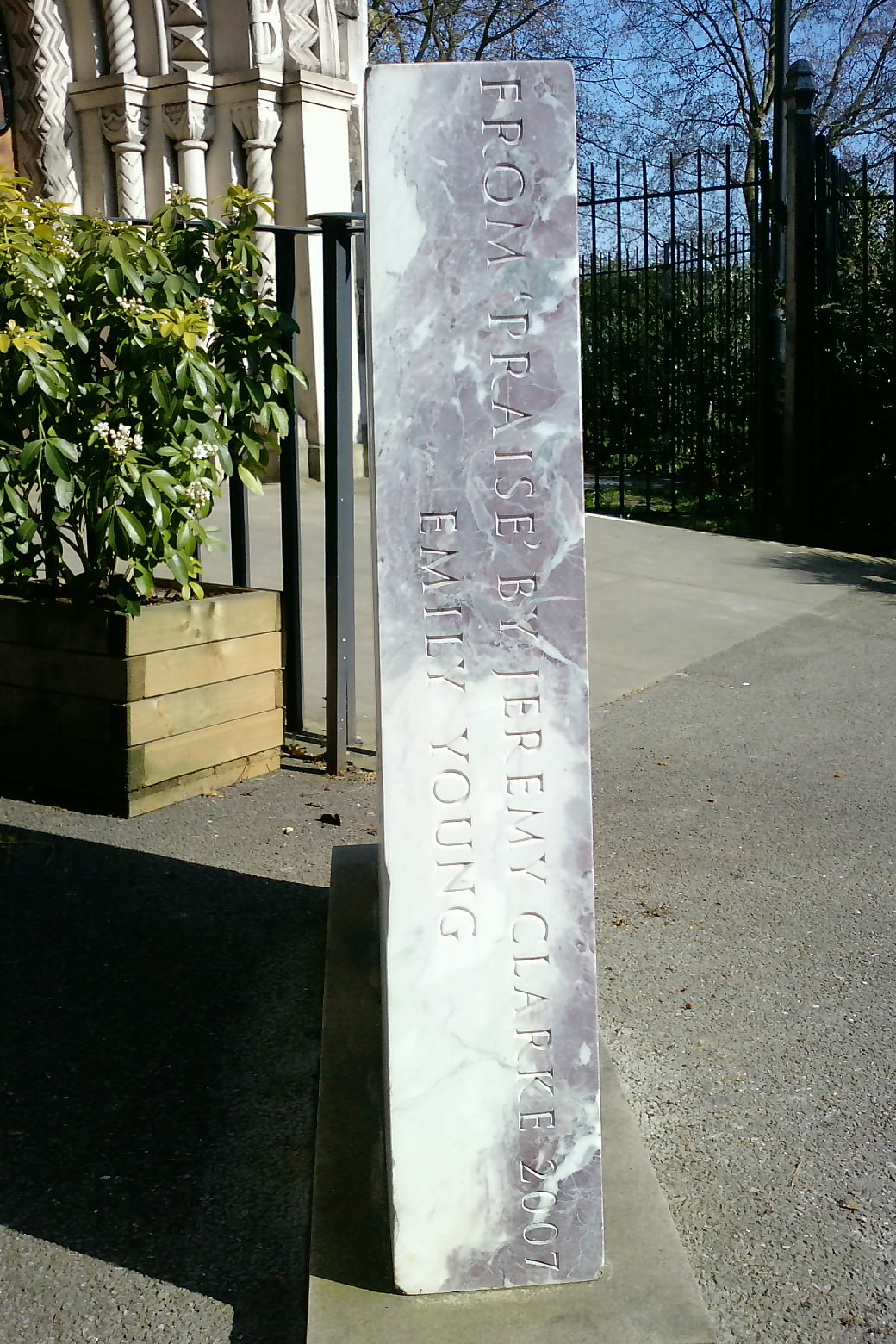
The Stone Installation by Jeremy Clarke and Emily Young. Side view

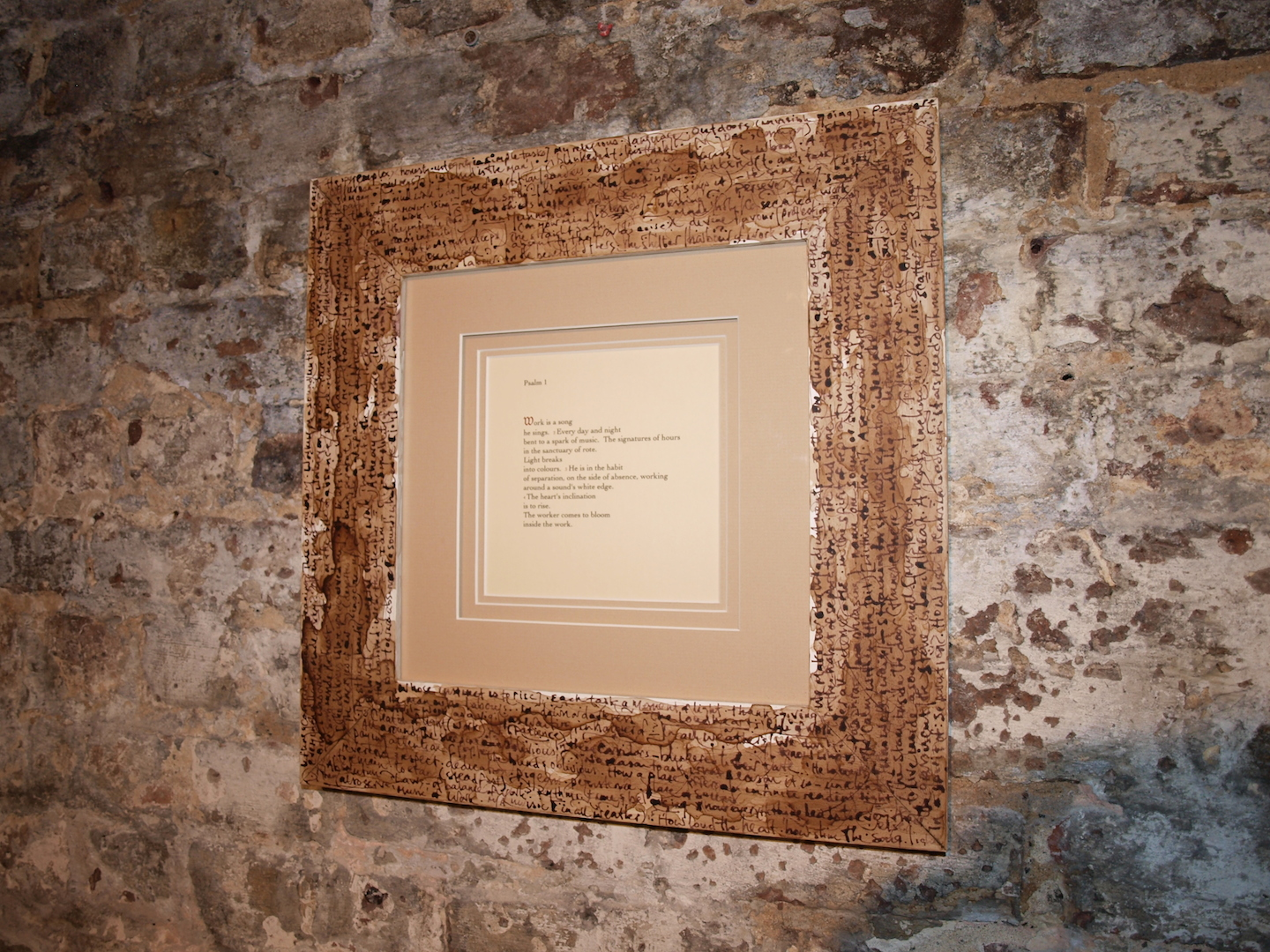
Framed Psalm from the Works on Paper exhibition. Front view

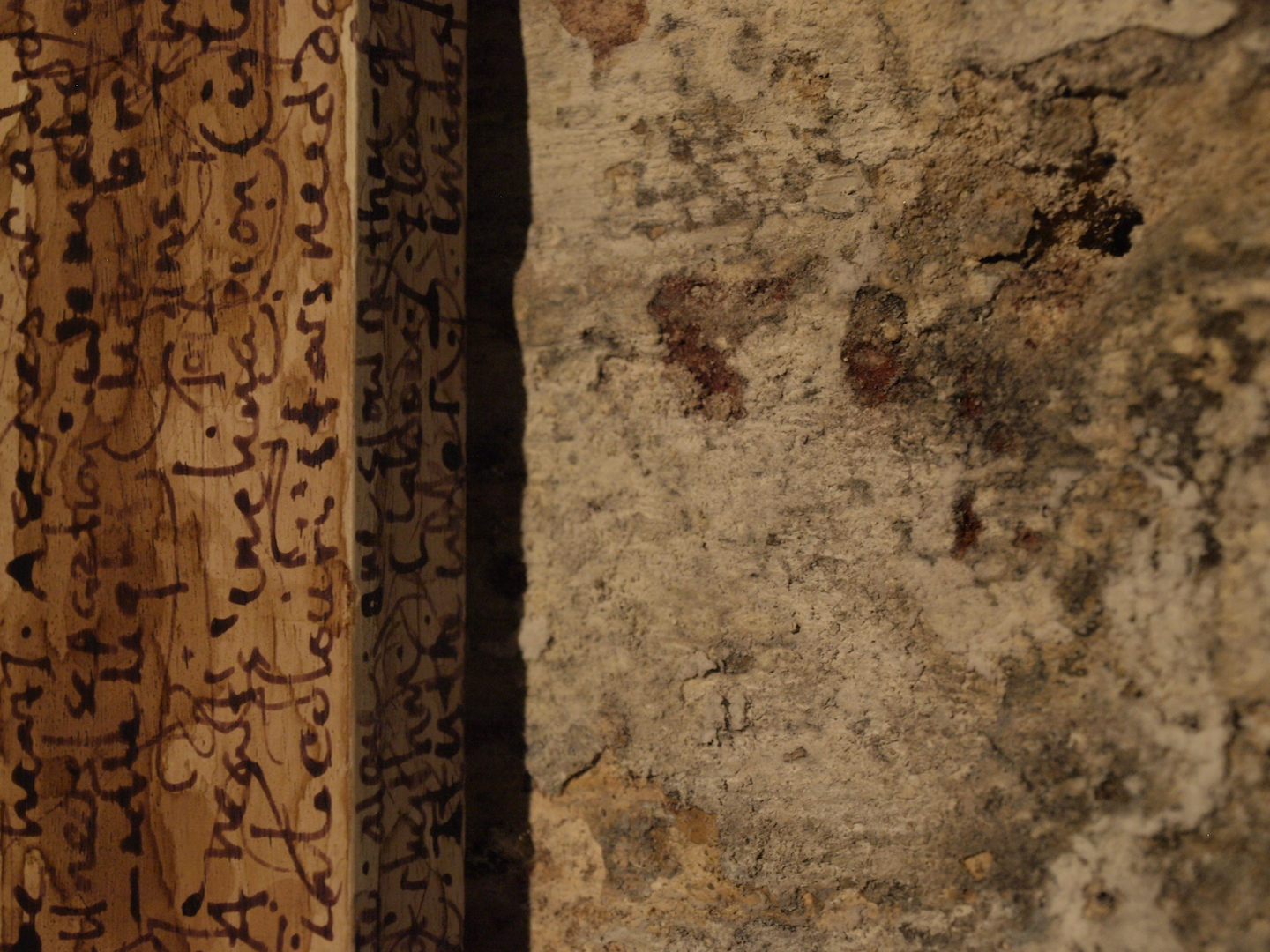
Framed Psalm from the Works on Paper exhibition. Side view

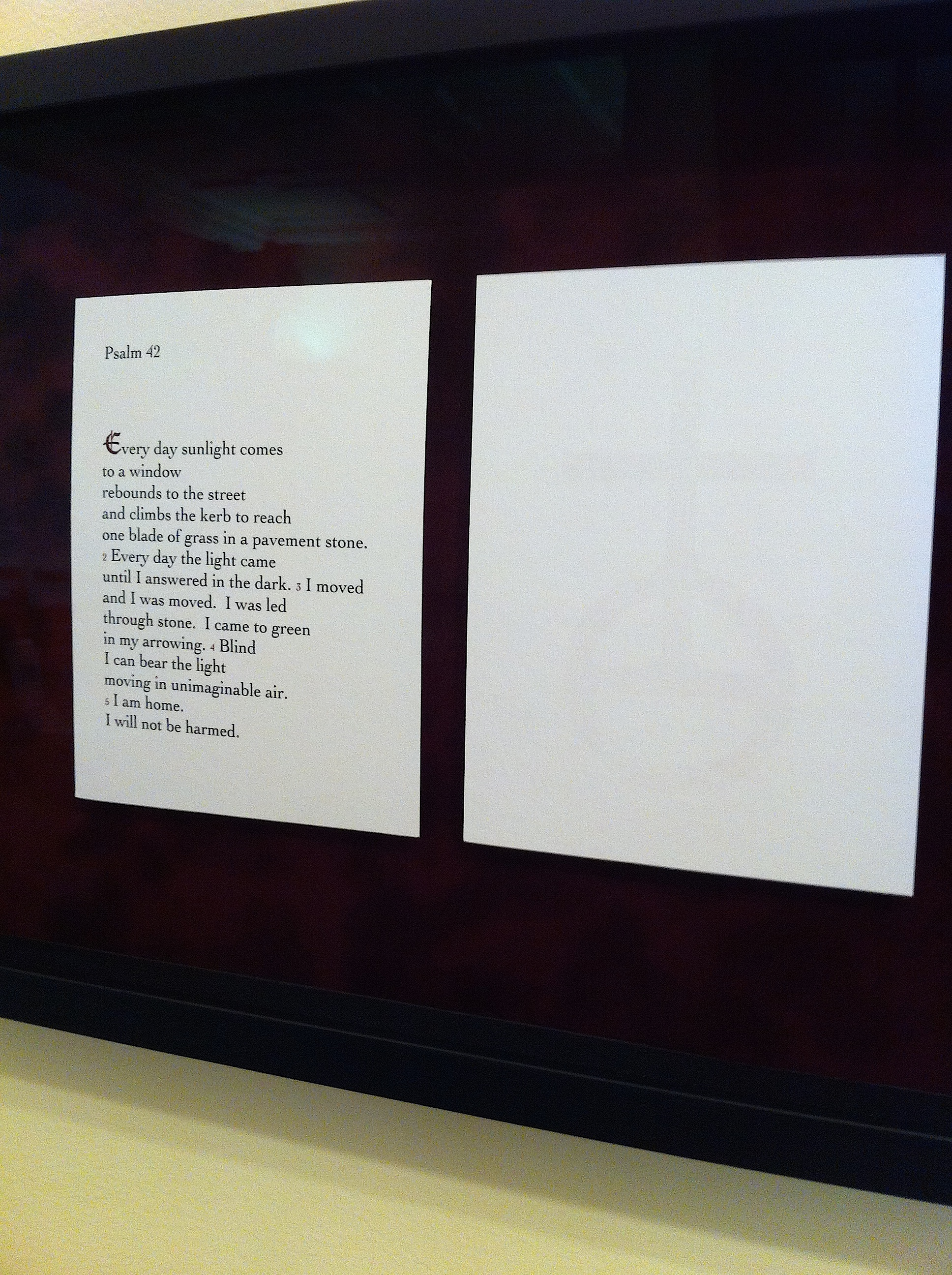
Psalm Card artwork, Church of St. Anselm and St. Cecilia

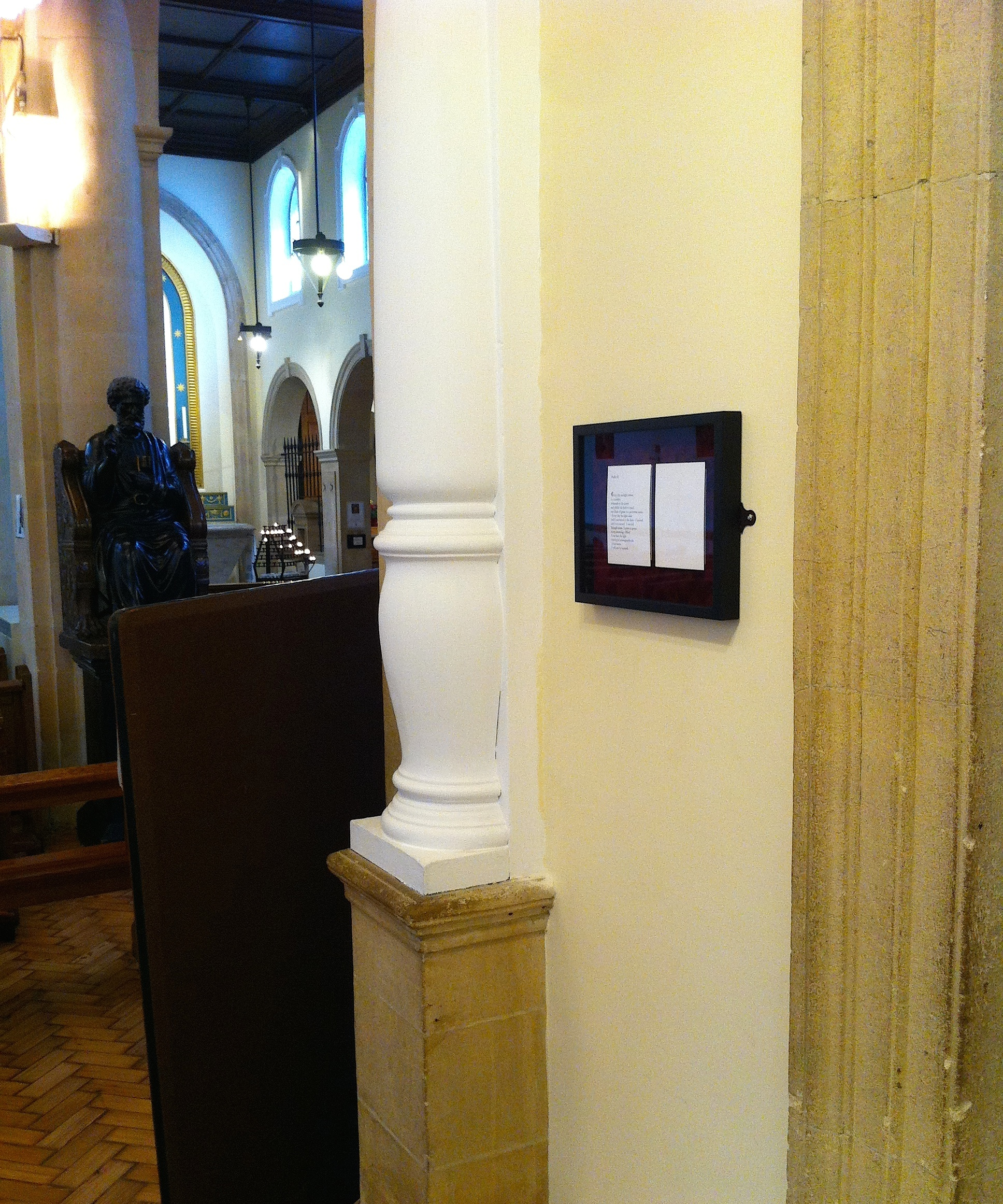
Psalm Card artwork in position in the church

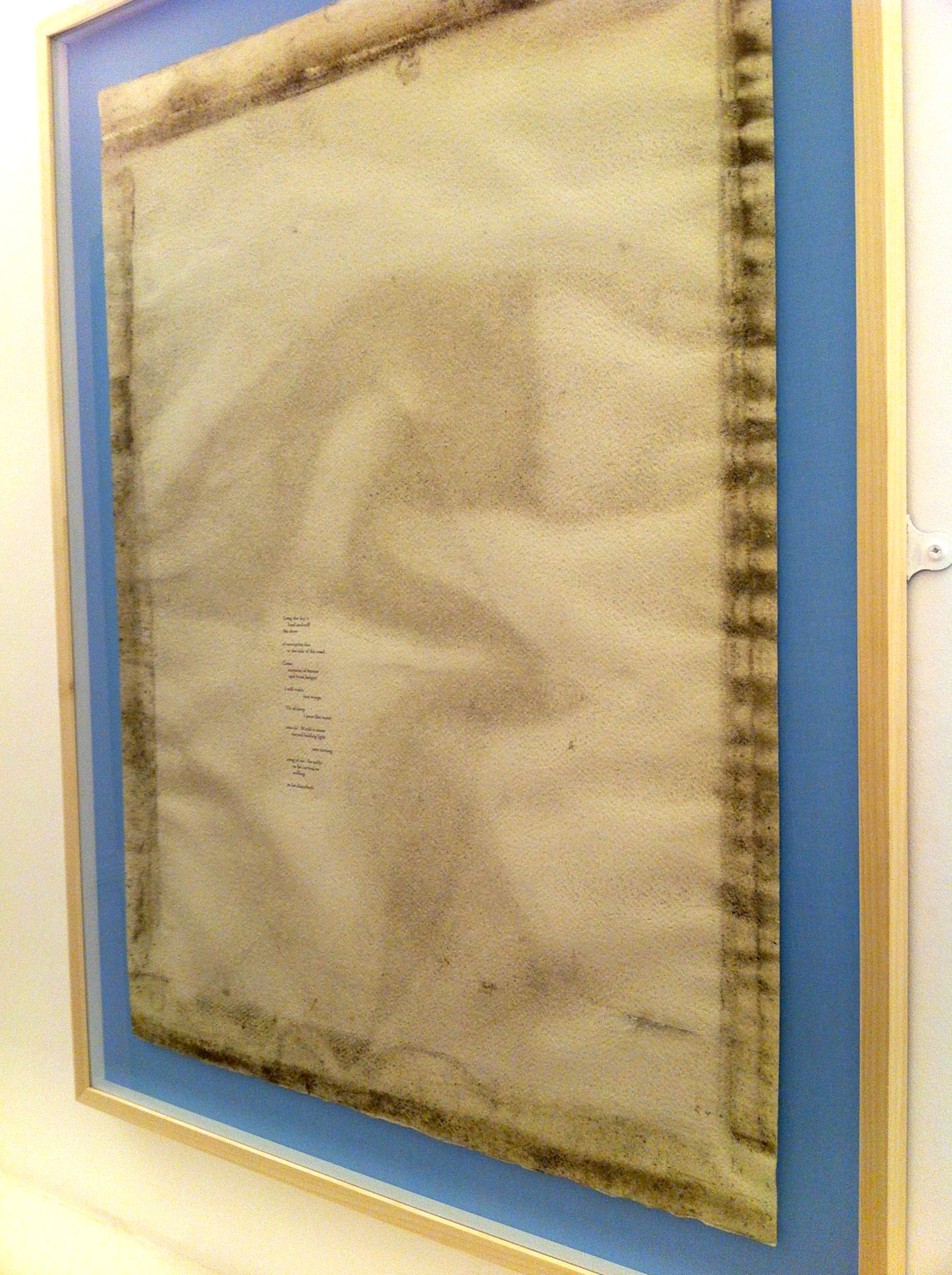
Host artwork

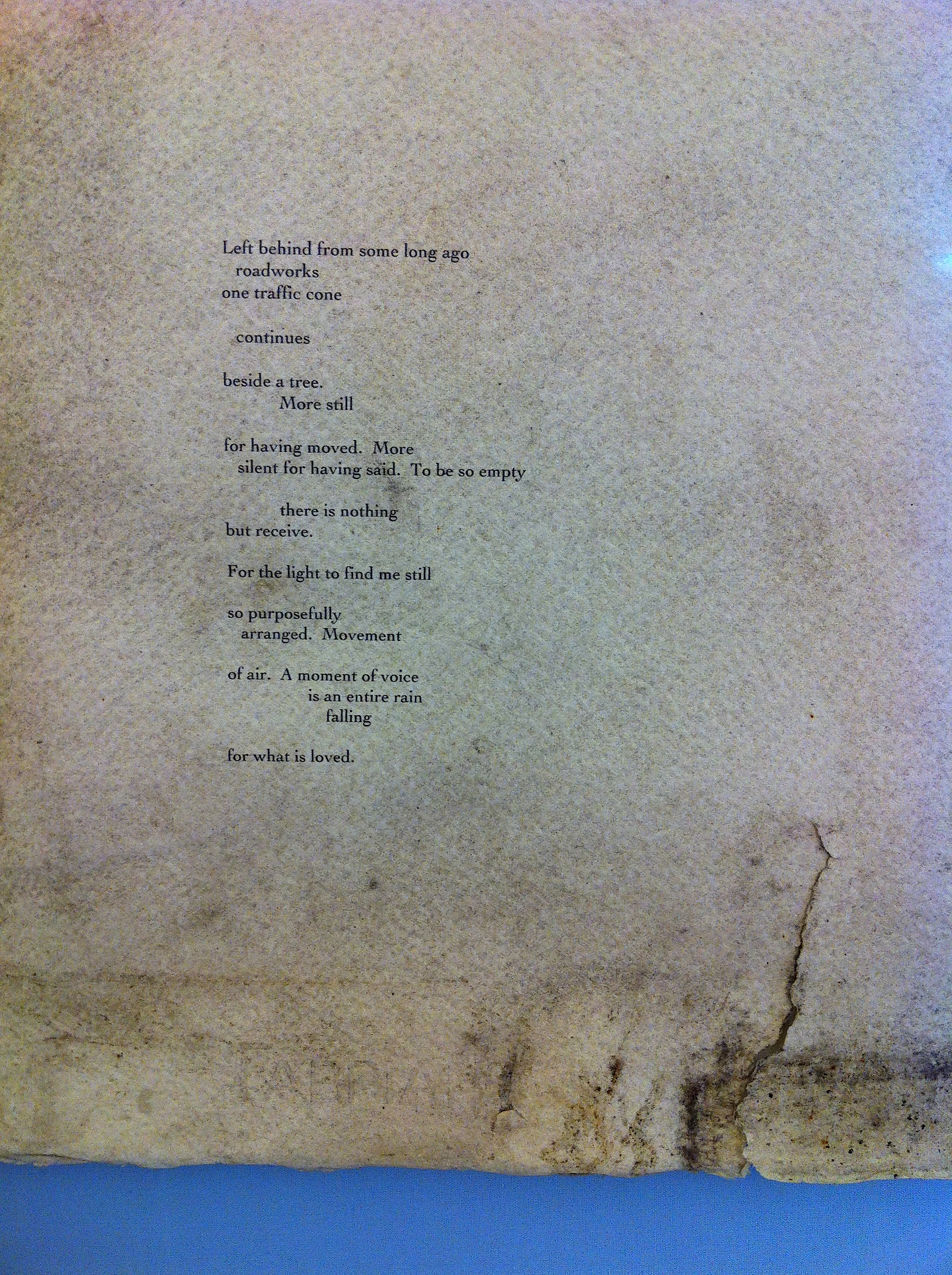
Host artwork: close view

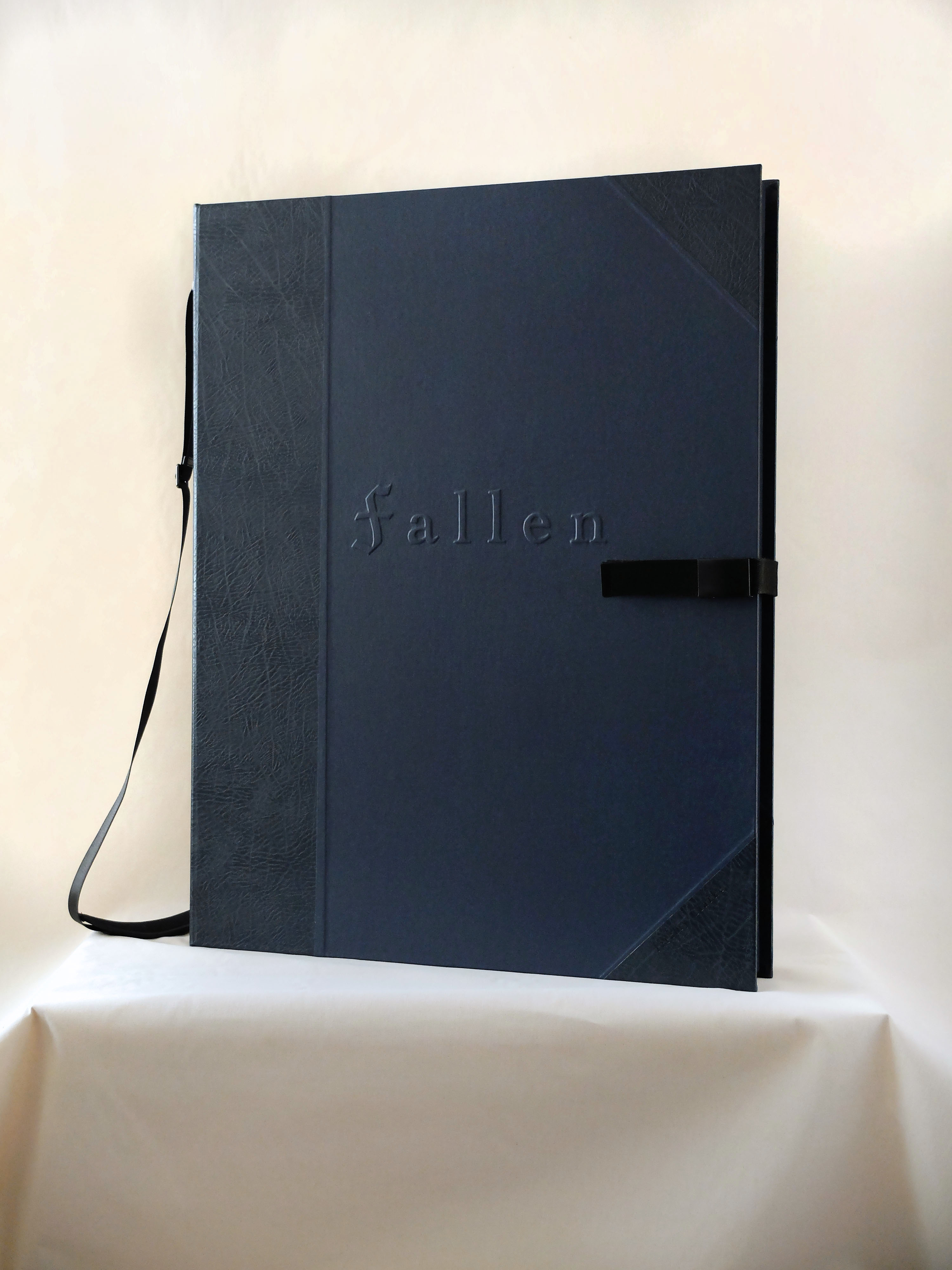
Front view of Fallen

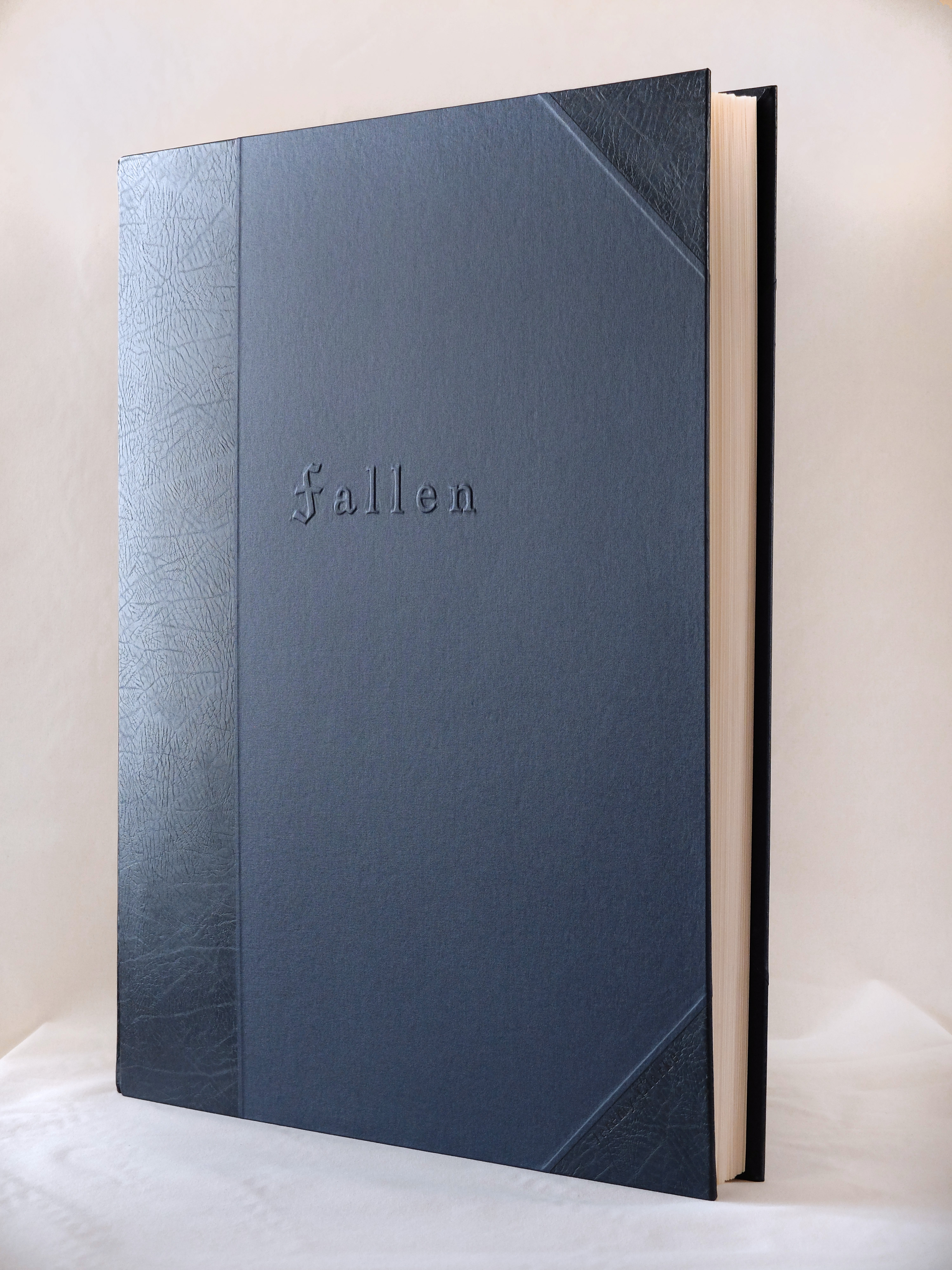
Three quarter view of Fallen

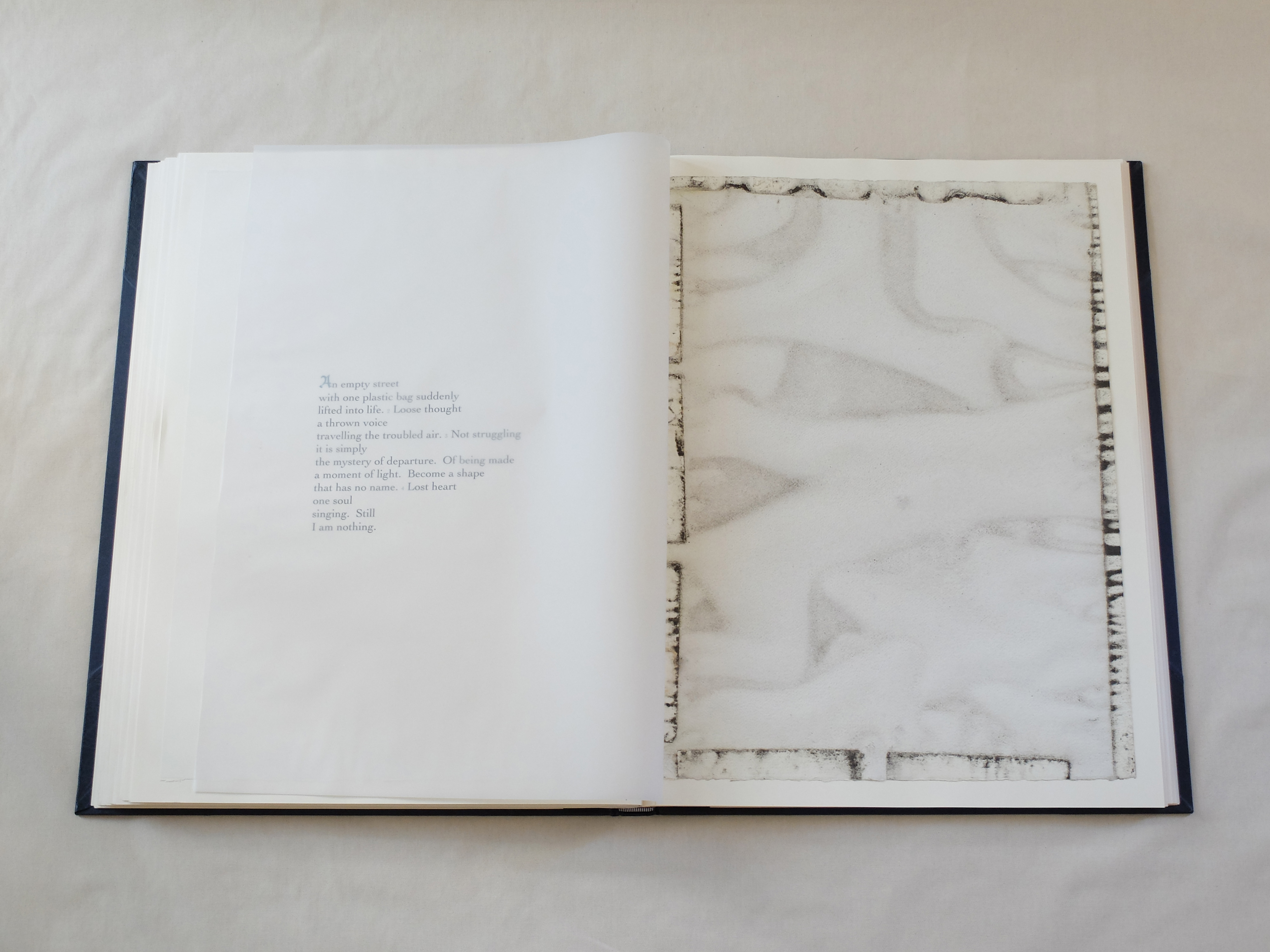
View of Fallen open: 1

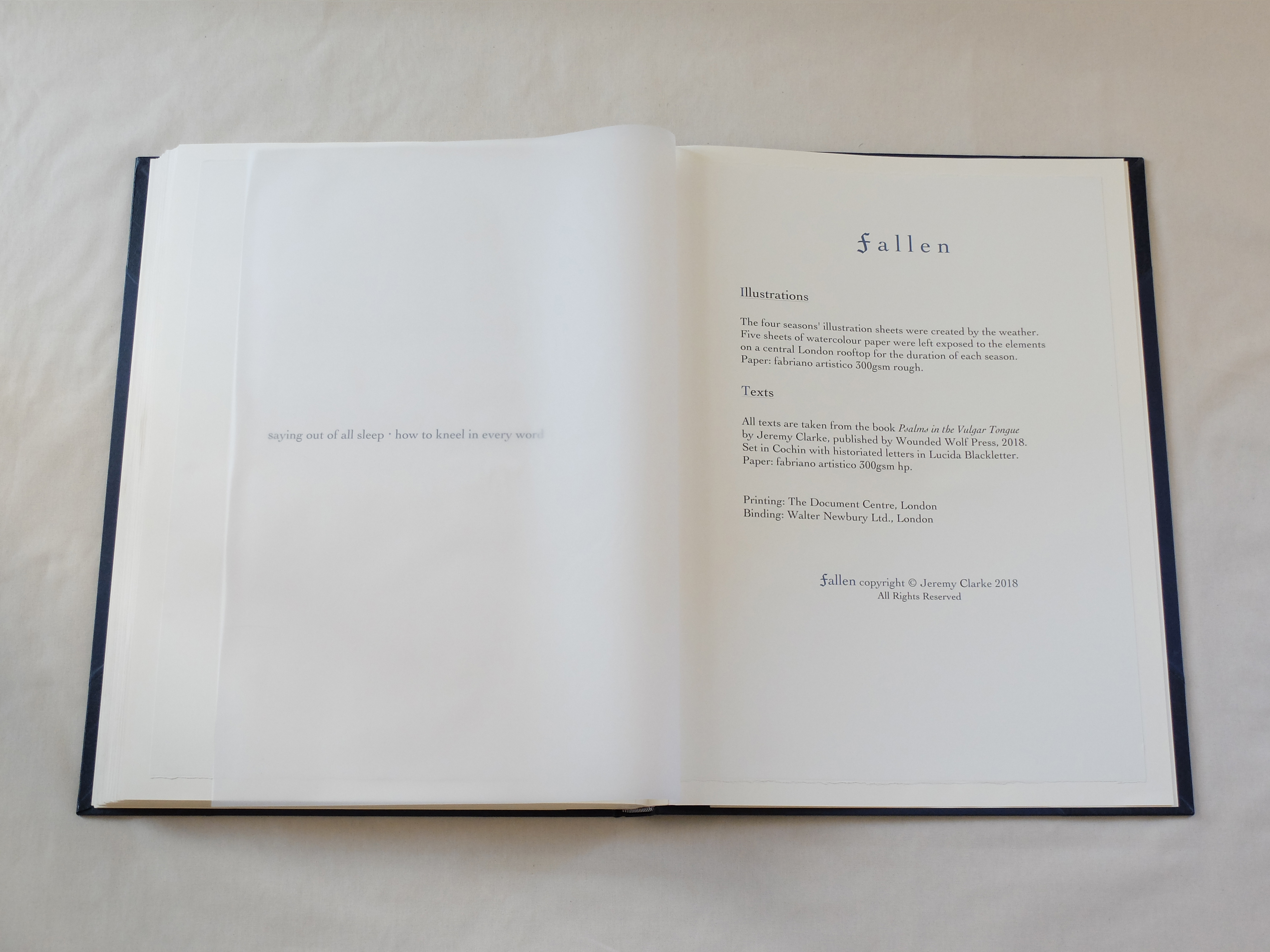
View of Fallen open: 2

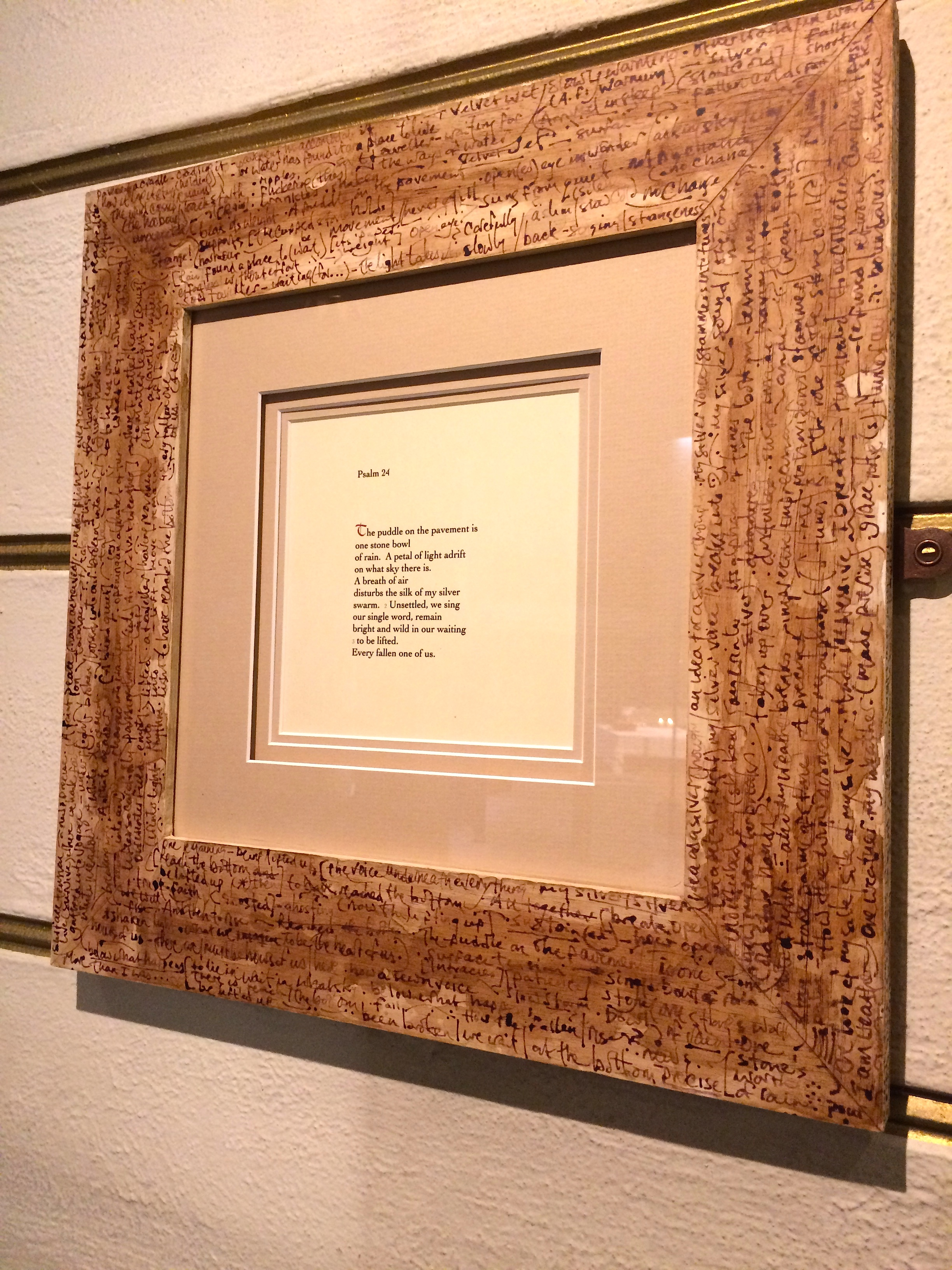
Framed Psalm at Notre Dame de France

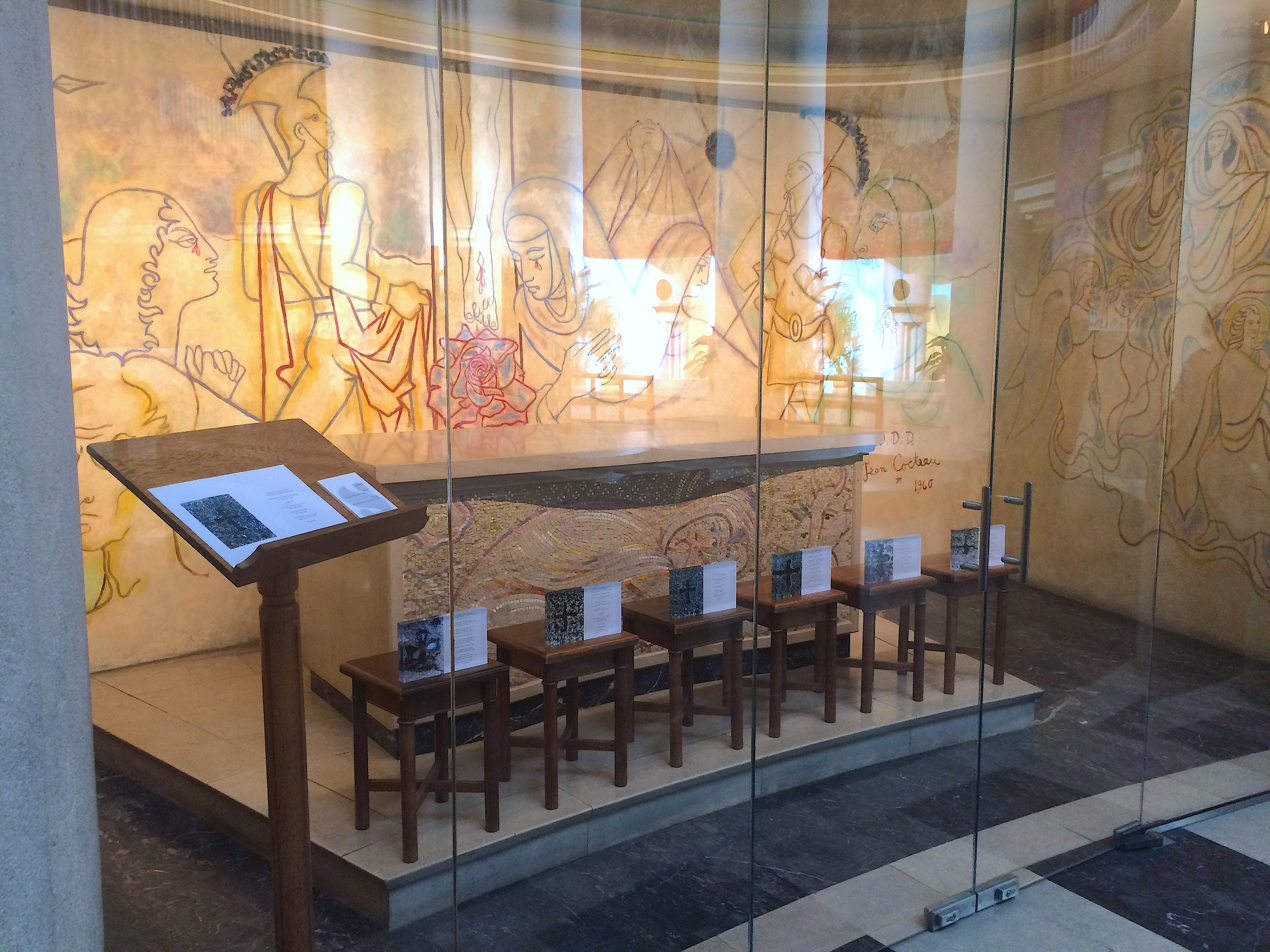
Stations in the Lady Chapel at Notre Dame de France

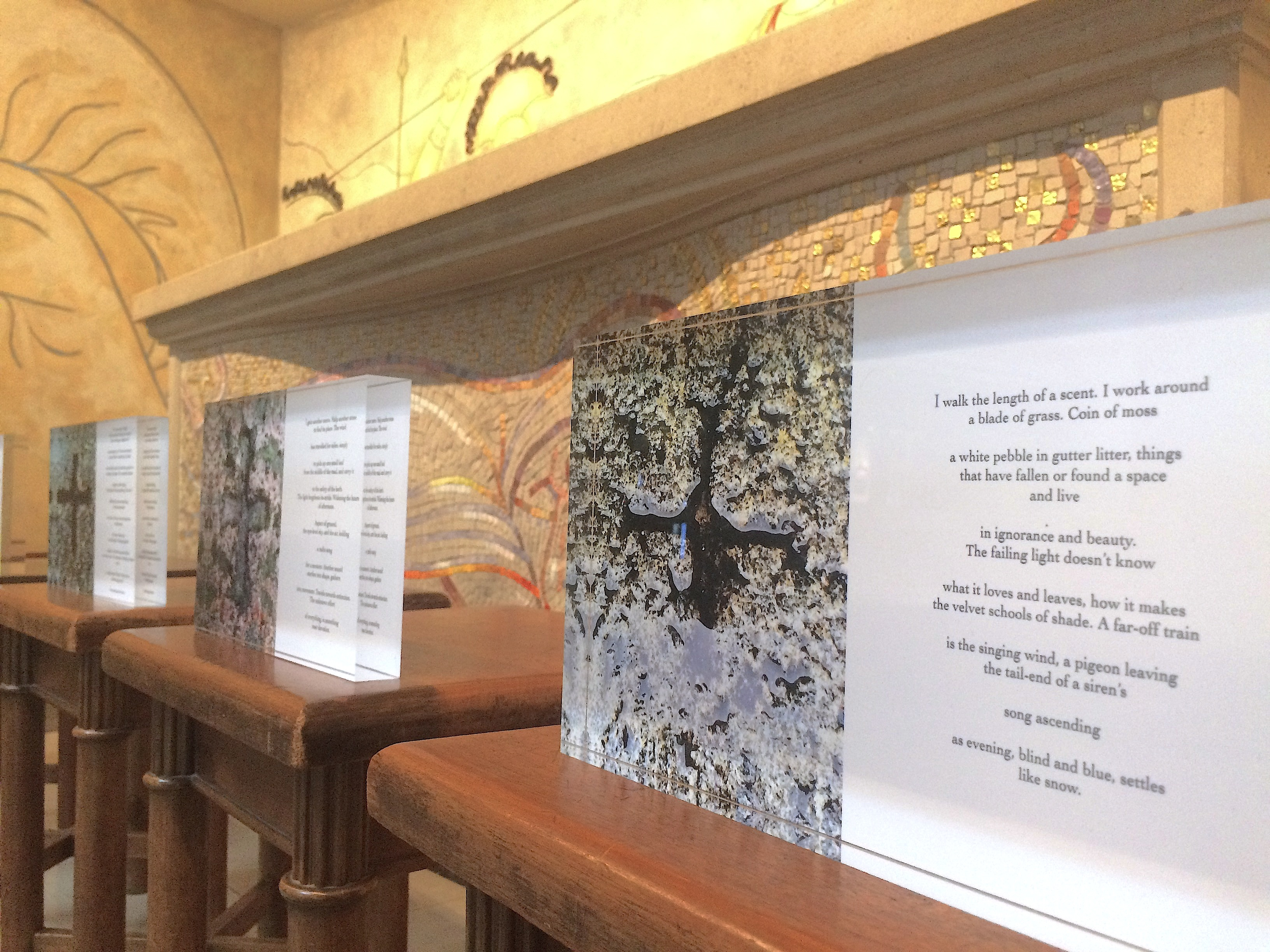
Stations: close view

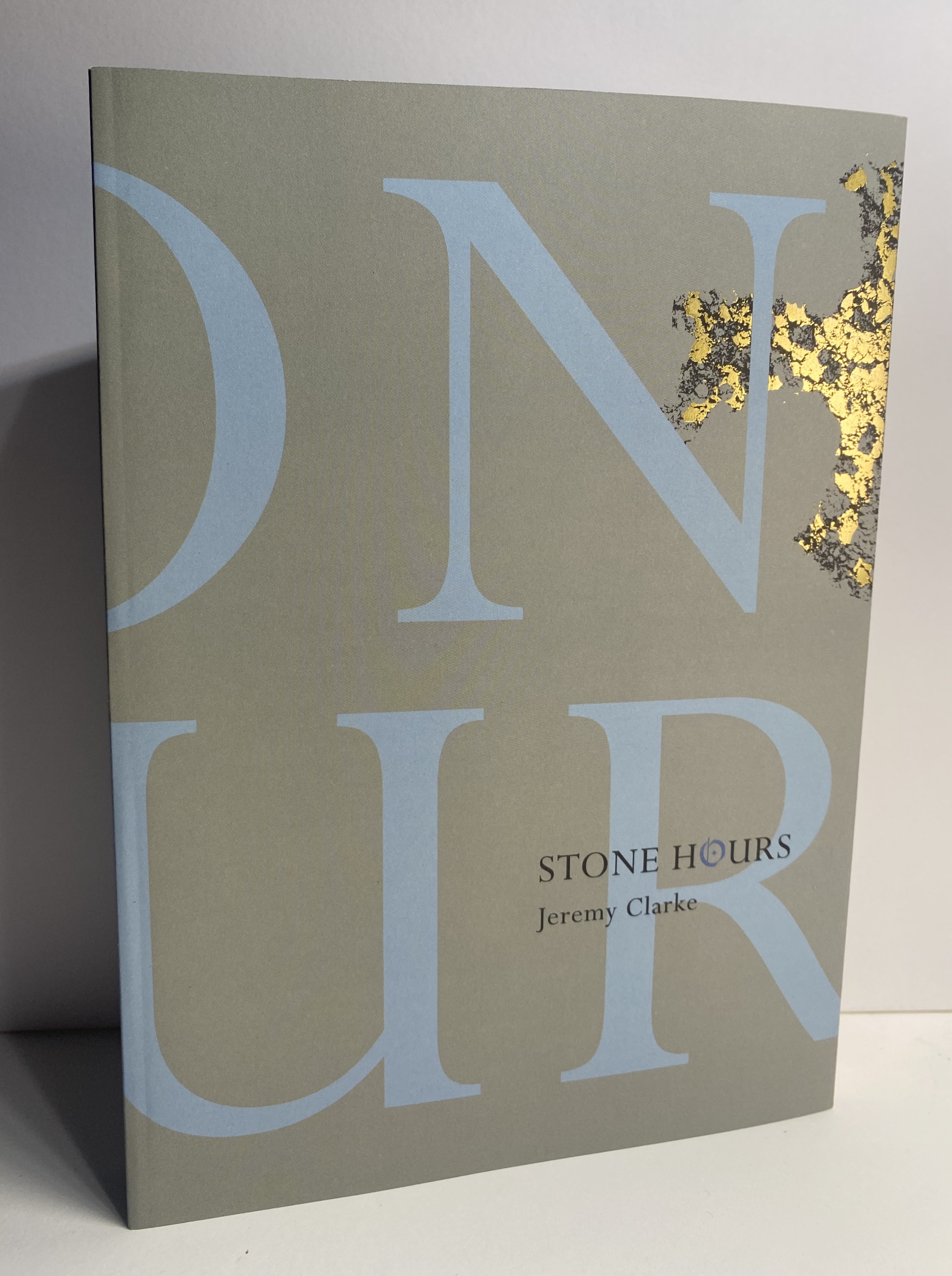
Stone Hours (2024)
