= Giambattista Tocco, Duke de Sicignano =

Giambattista Tocco Cantelmo Stuart, the Duke de Sicignano (c.1760 – 31 May 1793) was a Neapolitan diplomat who committed suicide shortly after his arrival in England in 1793.

Sicignano was appointed to replace the Prince of Castelcicala as the Ambassador of the Kingdom of Naples to the Court of St James's. At the time of his appointment, Sicignano had been the Envoy from Naples to Copenhagen.

Sicignano shot himself at Grenier's Hotel on Jermyn Street, St James's, on 31 May 1793. He had spoken for two hours that afternoon with the British Foreign Secretary, Lord Grenville, and was described as having been in "perfect composure" by James Hutton, the editor of the correspondence of James Bland Burges. Hutton wrote that Sicignano had previously complained of much "pain in the head" and had asked his friends whether shooting was preferable to drowning. He dictated two letters to his secretaries and asked them to return at 8 pm. The discovery of the Duke's body was detailed at length in the Annual Register. The coroner was bribed with £100 (equivalent to £11,996 in 2023) not to hold an inquest into Sicignano's death. He was buried in the churchyard of St Pancras Old Church on 3 June 1793.

Grenville wrote to George III to inform him of the Duke's death, telling the King that he had spoken to the Prince of Castelcicala and felt that the Duke "had no motive for this unhappy step other than his fear of difficulties which he thought he found in the negotiation with which he was charged conjointly with the prince". The King replied that "suicide seems so unnatural a crime that the frequency of it by no means diminishes the horror" and felt that his death was a result of insanity which he hoped is "the true solution of the dreadful step he has taken". Grenville asked James Bland Burges to inform William Hamilton, the British ambassador to the Kingdom of Naples, of Sicignano's death.

Sicignano is depicted as a character in Catherine Gore's 1859 historical novel Memoirs of a Peeress; Or, The Days of Fox.
