= Richards baronets =

Extinct baronetcy in the Baronetage of England

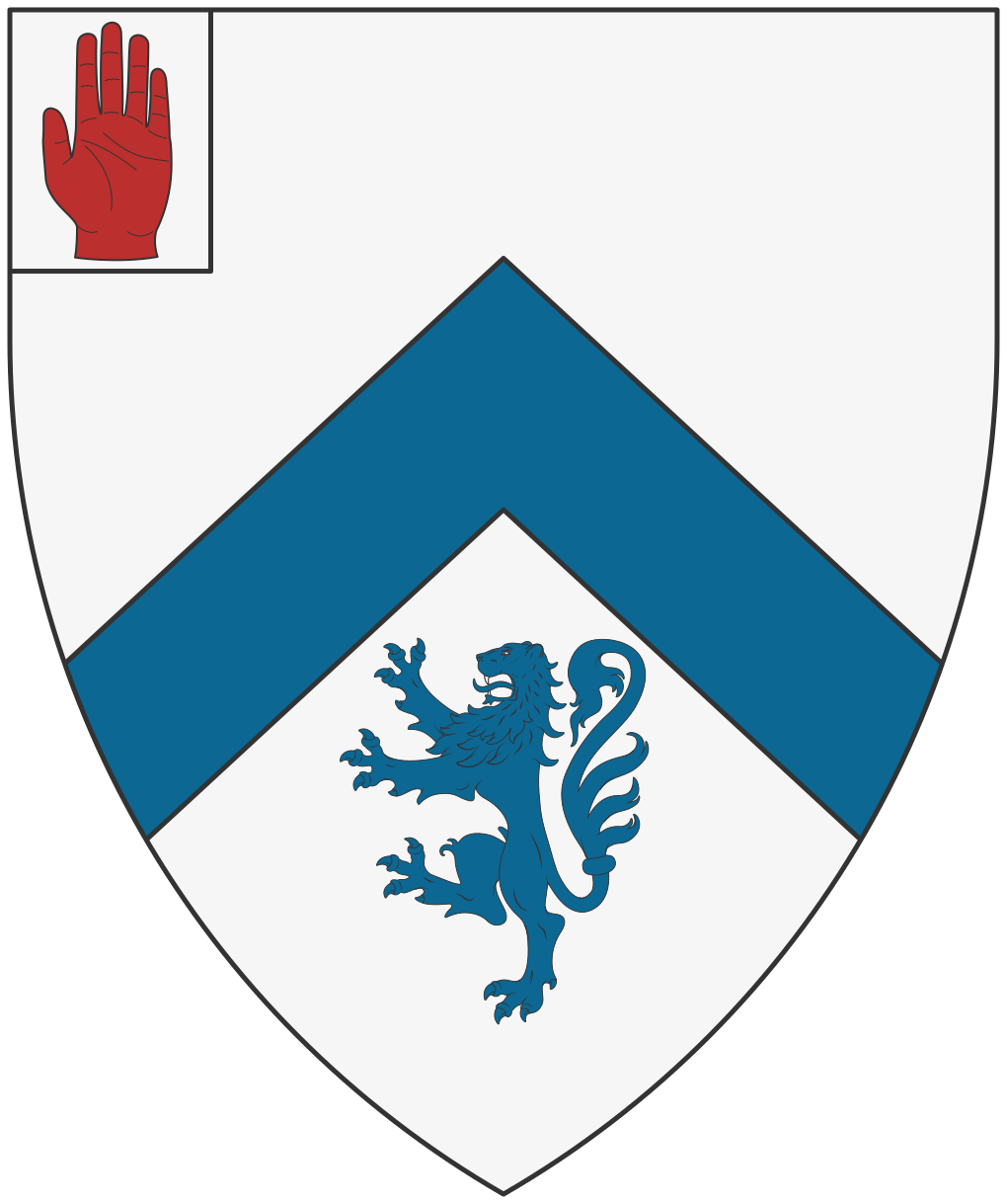
The coat of arms of the Richards baronets.

The Richards Baronetcy, of Brambletye House in the County of Suffolk, was a title in the Baronetage of England. It was created on 22 February 1684 for Sir James Richards. The second Baronet was a colonel in the Spanish Army and a merchant in Cádiz, Spain. The fourth Baronet was also an officer in the Spanish army. Nothing further is known of him or his possible descendants. The title became either extinct or dormant on his death some time after 1741.

== Richards baronets, of Brambletye House (1684) ==
- Sir James Richards, 1st Baronet (died c. 1705)
- Sir John Richards, 2nd Baronet (died c. 1729)
- Sir Joseph Richards, 3rd Baronet (c. 1685–1738)
- Sir Philip Richards, 4th Baronet (died after 1741)

Sir Joseph Richards was buried in Old St. Pancras Churchyard, but is not listed on the memorial of important graves lost.
