= St Pancras Old Church =

Church in Somers Town, Central London

Coordinates: 51°32′05.63″N 00°07′48.68″W

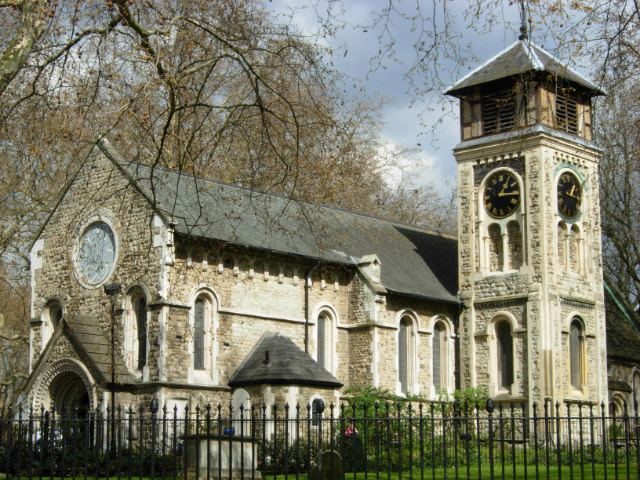
- St Pancras Old Church
- St Pancras Old Church
- Denomination: Church of England
- Tradition: Anglo-Catholic
- Website: posp.co.uk/st-pancras-old-church

Administration
- Province: Canterbury
- Diocese: London
- Archdeaconry: Hampstead
- Deanery: South Camden
- Parish: Old St Pancras

Clergy
- Bishop: The Rt Revd Jonathan Baker (AEO)
- Vicar: Owen Dobson

Listed Building – Grade II*
- Official name: Old Church of St Pancras
- Designated: 10 June 1954
- Reference no.: 1066500

St Pancras Old Church is a Church of England parish church on Pancras Road, Somers Town, in the London Borough of Camden. Somers Town is an area of the ancient parish and later Metropolitan Borough of St Pancras.

Dedicated to the Roman martyr Saint Pancras, the patron saint of children, it is reputed to be one of the oldest sites of Christian worship in England, although this is not supported by strong evidence. St Pancras Old Church, which was largely rebuilt in the Victorian era, should not be confused with St Pancras New Church (1819–1822) about 860 metres (940 yd) away on Euston Road.

== History ==
The building served the large ancient parish of St Pancras, which stretched from a point a short distance north of Oxford Street, northward to Highgate.

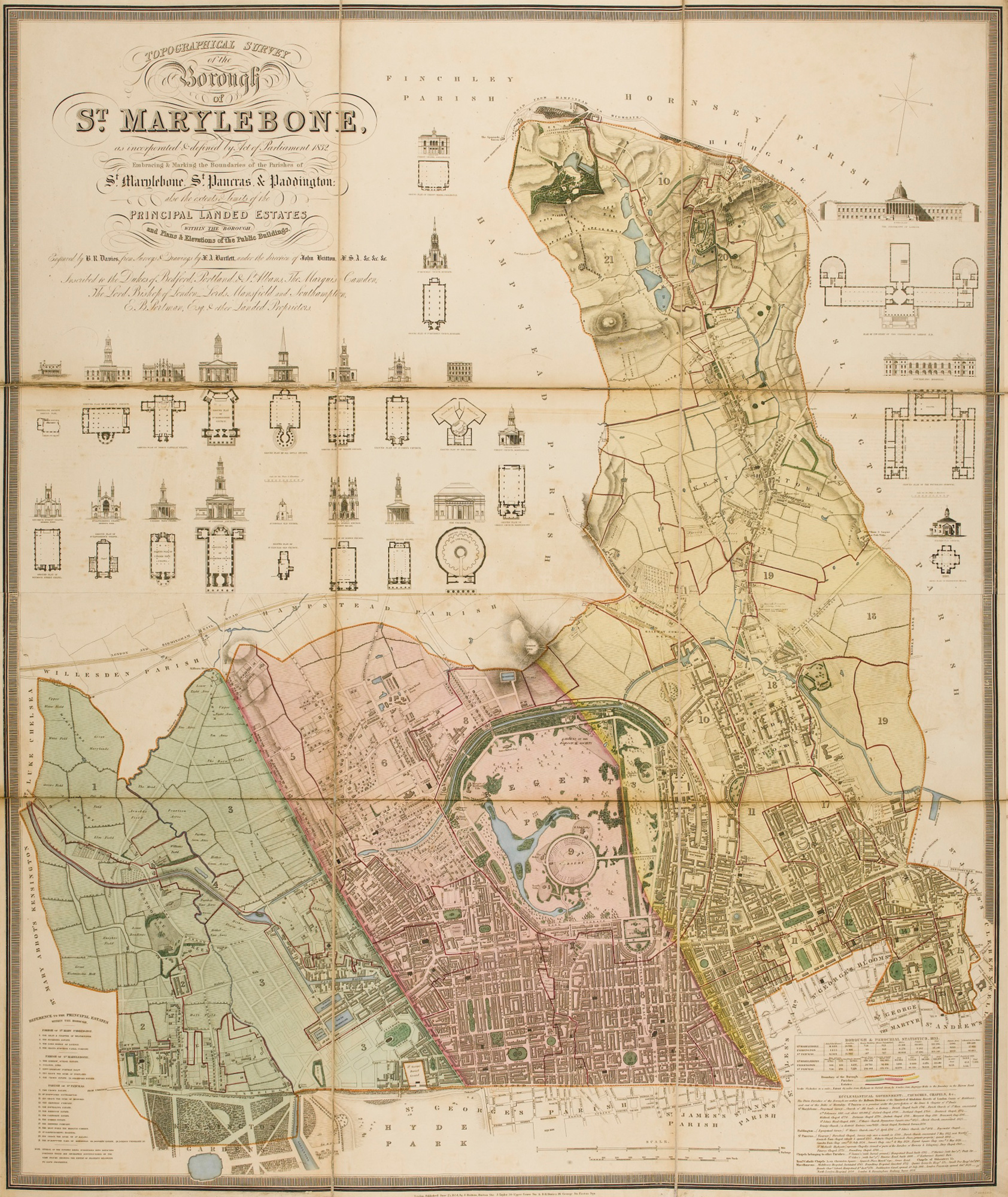
The Ancient Parishes of – west to east – Paddington and St Marylebone (in the modern City of Westminster), and St Pancras (in the modern London Borough of Camden) in 1834

=== Origins ===
By the 18th century there seems to have been a local belief that St Pancras was of very great age. By some traditions, the church has been a site of Christian worship since AD 314 in the Roman era, or since the early Anglo-Saxon period, traditions which would make the church the oldest in north London, and one of the very oldest in England. However as with most parish churches, especially the older ones, there is little documentary or archaeological evidence to allow the first use of the site to be dated. Remnants of medieval features in the building and references in the Domesday Book suggest the site was in use during the Anglo-Saxon period.

As early as 1593 the cartographer John Norden had commented in his Speculum Britanniae that the dilapidated St Pancras church looked older than St Paul's Cathedral.

==== Roman tradition ====
Information panels outside the church today state that it "stands on one of Europe’s most ancient sites of Christian worship, possibly dating back to the early 4th century" and has been a "site of prayer and meditation since 314 AD". A vicar of the church claimed (at some point prior to 1870) to have seen a document in the Vatican Library that placed the foundation to the 4th century, during the Roman period.

The case for a Roman period establishment was argued by local historian Charles Lee in 1955, who wrote:

There can be little doubt that a Roman encampment was situated opposite the site of St Pancras Church about this period, and that the church is on the site of a Roman Compitum, which served as a centre of public worship and public meeting... It seems probable that the Roman Compitum at St Pancras was adapted to Christian worship shortly after the restoration of religious freedom in 313 (taking its name from the recently-martyred Pancras).

Lee's "Roman encampment" was "Caesar’s Camp at Pancras called the Brill", identified by the antiquary William Stukeley in the 1750s. However, some at least of Stukeley's contemporaries could see no trace of this camp, and considered that Stukeley had let his imagination run away with him.

The place name 'The Brill' was recorded as 'The Bruel' in 1741-5 and 'The Bruil' in 1788. This may derive from the word 'bruil' or 'broil', a forest term denoting a park or woodstocked with beasts of the chase.

Gillian Tindall has suggested that the minor earthworks in the fields to the west of the church that Stukeley interpreted as a Roman camp were actually traces of the original medieval village of St Pancras, before the centre of the settlement moved north to the area now known as Kentish Town.

Lee's use of the word compitum, properly a Roman temple or shrine situated at a crossroads, indicates his indebtedness to the work of Montagu Sharpe (1856–1942), a Middlesex magistrate, former chairman of the Middlesex County Council and amateur historian and archaeologist. Sharpe had proposed, in a book first published in 1919, that the area of the county of Middlesex had in Roman times been subject to the form of land division known as centuriation, marked out by roads in a regular grid pattern covering the whole county. Sharpe noted, when plotting his gridlines, that a number of ancient parish churches appeared to be on or close to intersections, or at least on road alignments. He concluded that these churches must therefore stand on the sites of pagan compita, and represent the deliberate conversion of pagan temples to Christian use by early missionaries to the Middle Saxons in the 7th century. St Pancras Old Church is one of those marked on Sharpe's map.

==== Anglo-Saxon and Early Norman period ====
In 597, Pope Gregory the Great sent Augustine of Canterbury at the head of a group of 40 monks intending to promote the re-establishment of Christianity in England. Pope Gregory sent Augustine with relics of St Pancras, and the first church Augustine established, was dedicated to St Pancras and located in Canterbury, the capital of the Kingdom of Kent. Some traditions also ascribe the establishment of the St Pancras Old Church, or its dedication to St Pancras, with Augustine's mission and the relics he brought.

J. Carter Rendell (vicar 1912–26) argued that a medieval altar slab marked with five consecration crosses, found during the 19th-century building works, could be dated to the 6th century.

Phil Emery and Pat Miller discuss the archaeological history of the site in 'Archaeological findings at the site of the St Pancras Burial Ground and its vicinity':

The 1847 reconstruction of the medieval church revealed Roman tiles in the fabric of its tower and an inscribed altar stone dated to AD 625 (other sources estimate an AD 600 date), which might suggest an early 7th-century foundation. The original cemetery around the church appears to have been sub-circular like many late Saxon cemeteries

These archaeological findings seem to go some way to countering the 18th century London historian William Maitland, who dismissed links to Augustine's era as a "vulgar Tradition", and suggested that there was confusion with the ancient church with the same dedication in the grounds of St Augustine's Abbey in Canterbury, which was said to have been converted from a pagan temple by Augustine in 598.

In 1870 local historian Samuel Palmer reported "This old and venerable church is said to be the first Christian place of worship in the county of Middlesex in the eighth or ninth century."

An earlier vicar is said to have claimed to have seen in the Vatican Library a manuscript mentioning that St Pancras church was built in the 9th century (in addition to the other clergyman who claimed to have found reference to a Roman era establishment).

The church is known to have been present in the 11th century, being one of very few mentioned in the Domesday Book.

=== Medieval and Tudor church building ===
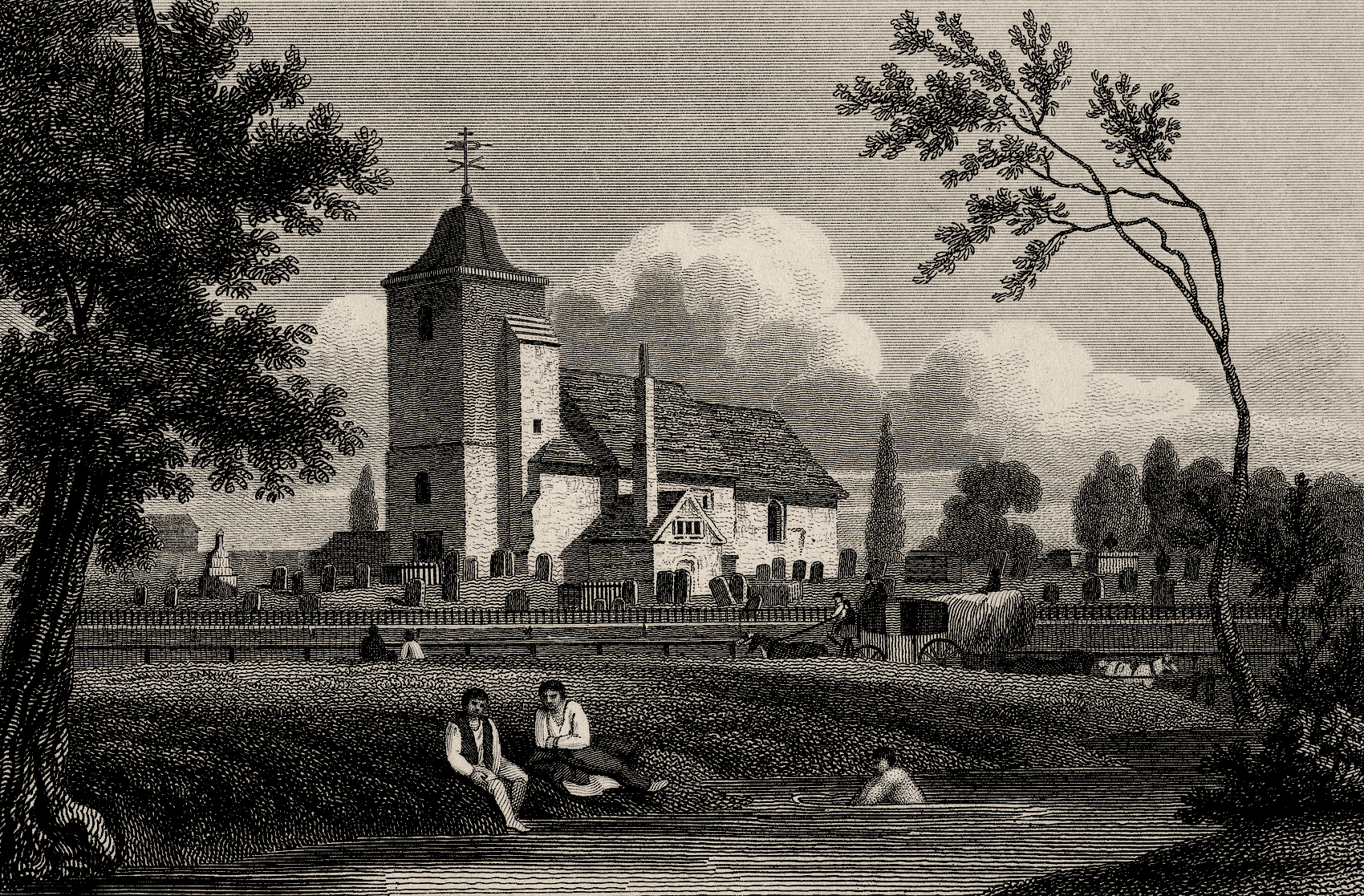
St Pancras Old Church in 1815. It was largely reconstructed later in the 19th century. The River Fleet has been covered over.

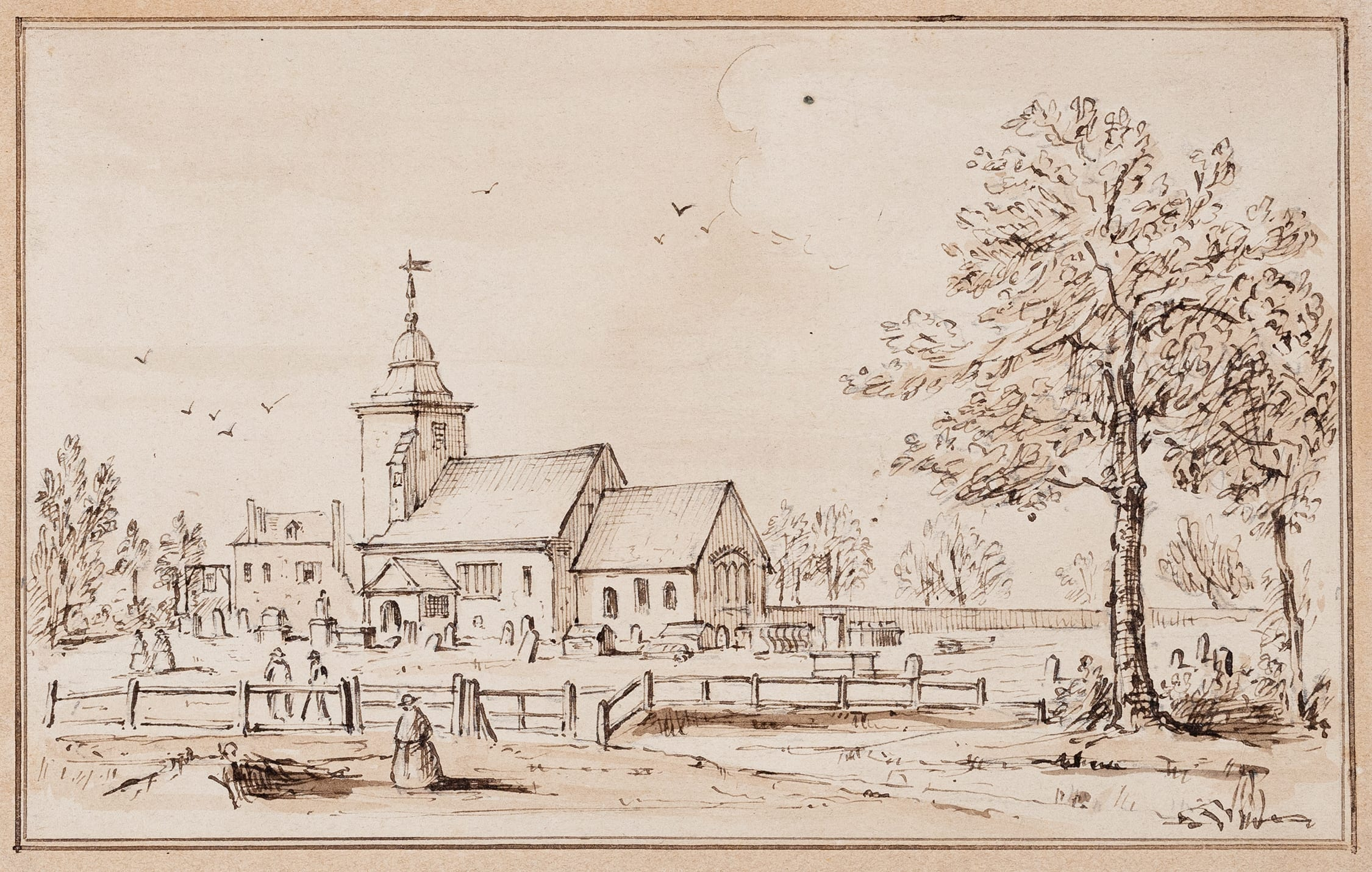
An anonymous pen-and-ink sketch of the south-east view, circa 1840

When the church was rebuilt in 1847, builders found some evidence of Anglo-Saxon period church activity and some re-used Roman tiles in the walls. They were able to identify that the church building they were replacing was mainly late Tudor with elements of earlier structures incorporated.

According to a Victorian architect, Robert Lewis Roumieu, involved in the works:

The old church was principally late Tudor. When it was pulled down to be rebuilt, several small Norman columns, pilaster piers and other remains of a Norman edifice were found among the materials used in the wall, leaving no doubt but that the original church had been a Norman structure which had been at some time completely rebuilt and part used as building material in the reconstruction.

In the early Middle Ages there was a centre of population in the vicinity of what is now known as the old church. However, in the 14th century the focus of population is thought to have shifted to what is now Kentish Town (further north in St Pancras parish). The reasons for this were probably the vulnerability of the plain around the church to flooding (the River Fleet, which is now underground, runs through it) and the availability of better wells at Kentish Town, where there is less clay in the soil.

=== Disrepair and restoration ===
After the Reformation the isolation and decay of the church made it a tempting resort for Catholics: indeed, it was said that the last bell which tolled for the Mass in England was at St Pancras. St Pancras (and to a lesser degree Paddington Church) were the only places in London where Roman Catholics were permitted to be buried. Among the several Catholics buried in the churchyard was Johann Christian Bach, youngest son of Johann Sebastian Bach. His name was misspelled in the burial register as John Cristian Back.

The church fell into disrepair and towards the end of the 18th century services were only held there on one Sunday each month; on other weeks, the same congregation would use a chapel in Kentish Town. 18th and early 19th century urban expansion led to the construction of the capacious St Pancras New Church on what was then the "New Road" (Euston Road, about a km away). (Note: Then a section of what was simply known as the "New Road".) The old building lost its status as the parish church when the New Church was consecrated in 1822, and became a chapel of ease. As it stood in the early 19th century, the church consisted of an unaisled nave, a chancel without a chancel arch and a western tower. The south porch had served as a vestry since the 18th century.

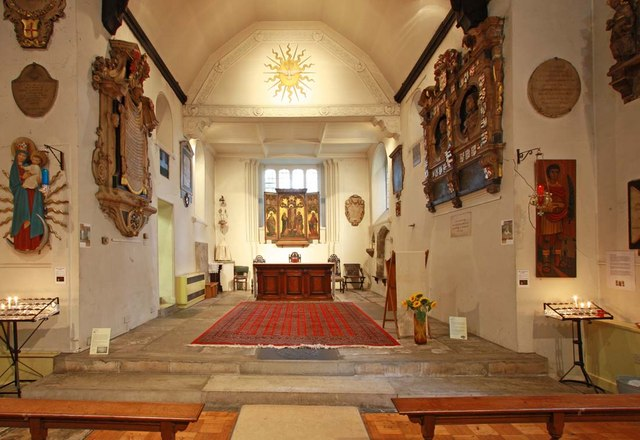
Interior view of the chancel

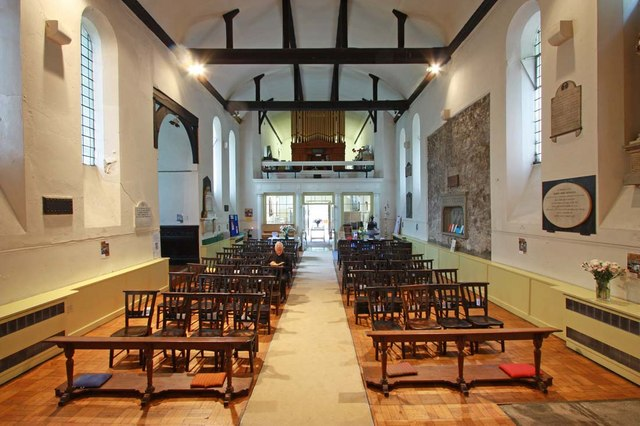
Interior looking west

By 1847 the Old Church was derelict, but in view of the growth of population in the southern part of the parish, it was decided to restore it. (Victorian restoration of churches is not what we understand today by the phrase building restoration.) The architect of the alterations was Alexander Dick Gough.

The old tower was removed, allowing the nave to be extended westwards, and a new tower was built on the south side. The south porch was removed, and a new vestry was added on the north side. The whole exterior of the church was refaced or reworked. The enlargement and the addition of galleries increased the capacity of the church from about 120 to 500.

Services resumed, including funerals, baptisms and weddings, such as that, on July 25, 1852, of William Rose, of Fulletby, and Helen Tippetts, of Windsor, daughter of Obadiah Tippetts, silk merchant and draper of Cheapside, by Curate R. P. Wilkinson. There were further restorations of the Old Church in 1888 by Arthur Blomfield with the reredos by C. E. Buckeridge; in 1925 when the plaster ceiling and the side galleries were removed, and in 1948 following Second World War bomb damage. The building was designated a grade II* listed building on 10 June 1954, That year also saw the former parish of Christ Church Somers Town (destroyed in the 1940 Blitz) merged into that of St Pancras Old Church, followed by that of St Matthew's Oakley Square in 1956.

=== Clergy ===
The first recorded vicar was Fulcherius, who was appointed in 1181. Richard Granger is named as parson of the church of St Pancras, in 1446.

=== Present organisation ===
The church has a chaplaincy to the nearby St Pancras Hospital and from 2003 to 2023 it formed part of the Old St Pancras Parish (which also included St Michael's Church, Camden Town, St Mary's Church, Somers Town and St Paul's Church, Camden Square - all four are now independent parishes again).

On 11 December 2007 it marked the opening of the nearby St Pancras International station with a bilingual service and a twinning with the Church of Saint-Vincent-de-Paul, Paris, near the Gare du Nord, Paris. In 2013 an official appeals project was launched to raise the funds necessary to preserve the church and grounds.

As a traditional Anglo-Catholic church that rejects the ordination of women as priests and bishops, it receives alternative episcopal oversight from the Bishop of Fulham (currently Jonathan Baker).

== Internal monuments ==
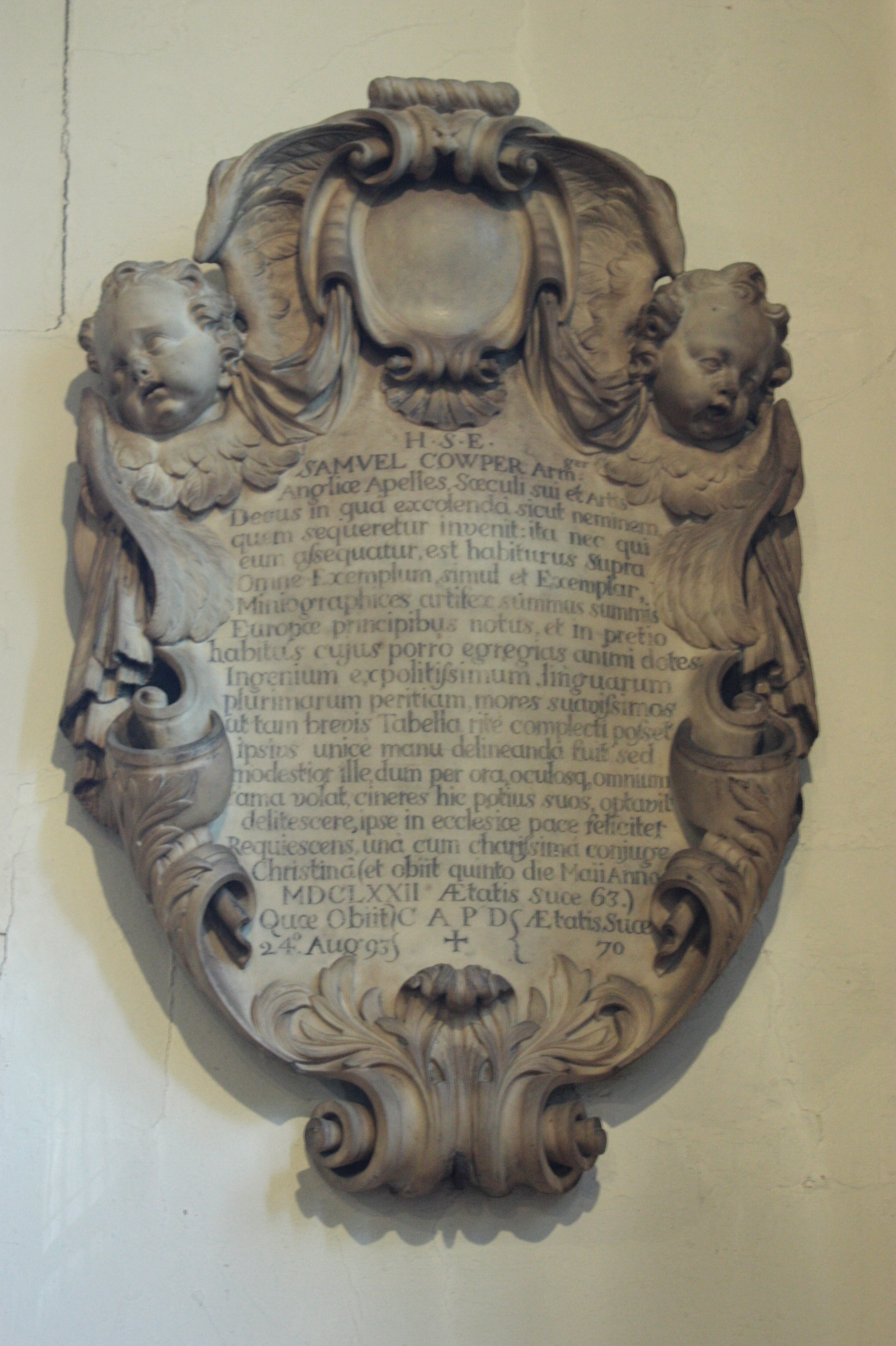
Grave of Samuel Cooper

The church contains the grave of Samuel Cooper (or Cowper), the miniaturist, against its east wall.

== Churchyard ==
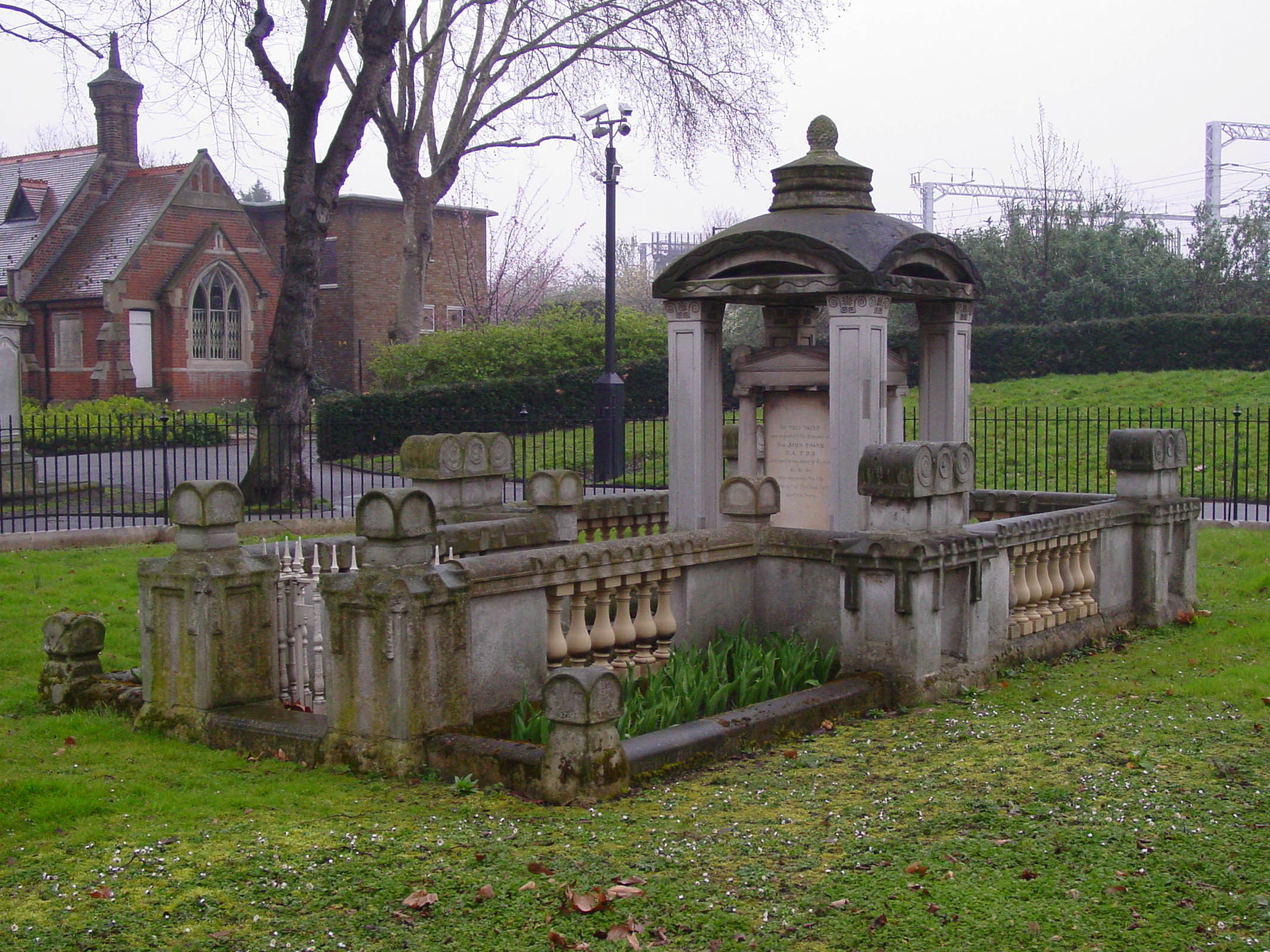
Tomb of John Soane

The churchyard, which is the largest green space in the locality, is managed by the London Borough of Camden. It has some fine mature trees, and was restored in the first few years of the 21st century.

The graveyard served not only as a burial place for the parishioners but also for Roman Catholics from all around London. They included many French refugees (émigrés), especially priests, who had fled the Revolution, one of them the spy Chevalier d'Éon. Notable people buried in the churchyard include the notorious colonial administrator Joseph Wall who was executed for cruelty in 1802. The famous vampire writer ("The Vampyre" published in 1819) and physician John William Polidori (buried in 1821), the composers Carl Friedrich Abel and Johann Christian Bach, the eighteenth child of Johann Sebastian Bach, and the sculptor John Flaxman. William Franklin, the illegitimate son of Benjamin Franklin and last colonial Governor of New Jersey, was interred here in 1814.

There is a spousal memorial tomb for philosophers and writers Mary Wollstonecraft and William Godwin, though their remains are now in Bournemouth. In 2009, commemorations of the 250th anniversary of Wollstonecraft's birth were held by various groups, both inside the church and at the gravestone. In the 17th and 18th centuries, many foreign dignitaries and aristocrats were buried in the graveyard; they are commemorated on the Burdett-Coutts Memorial Sundial, an elaborate memorial commissioned by the philanthropist Angela Burdett-Coutts, 1st Baroness Burdett-Coutts.

The architect John Soane designed a tomb for his wife and himself in the churchyard, which is now Grade I listed. This mausoleum may have provided the inspiration for the design by Giles Gilbert Scott of the iconic red telephone boxes.

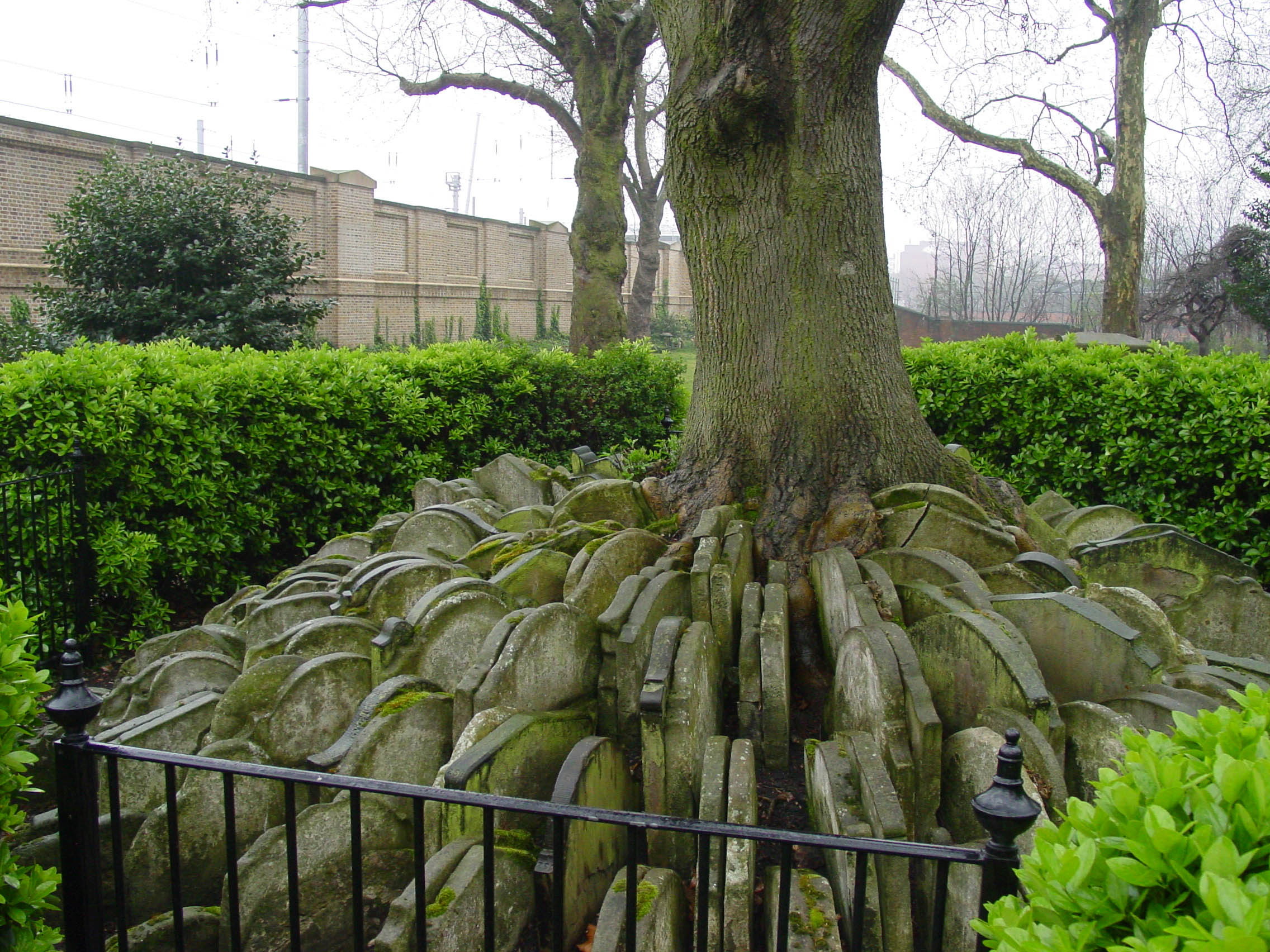
The Hardy Tree, a Great Tree of London, growing between gravestones moved while Thomas Hardy was working here. The tree fell in December 2022.

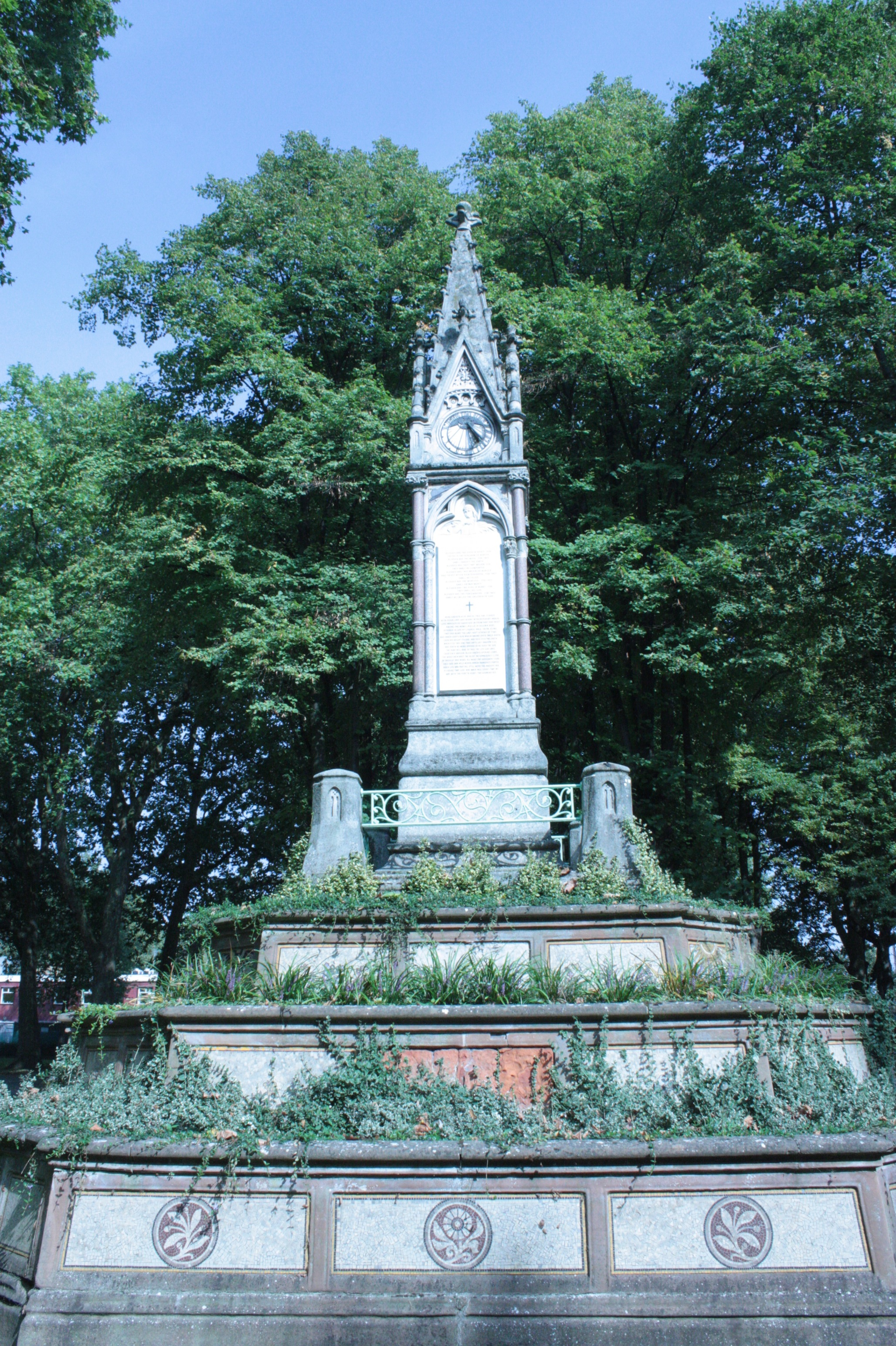
The Burdett Coutts Memorial to Lost Graves

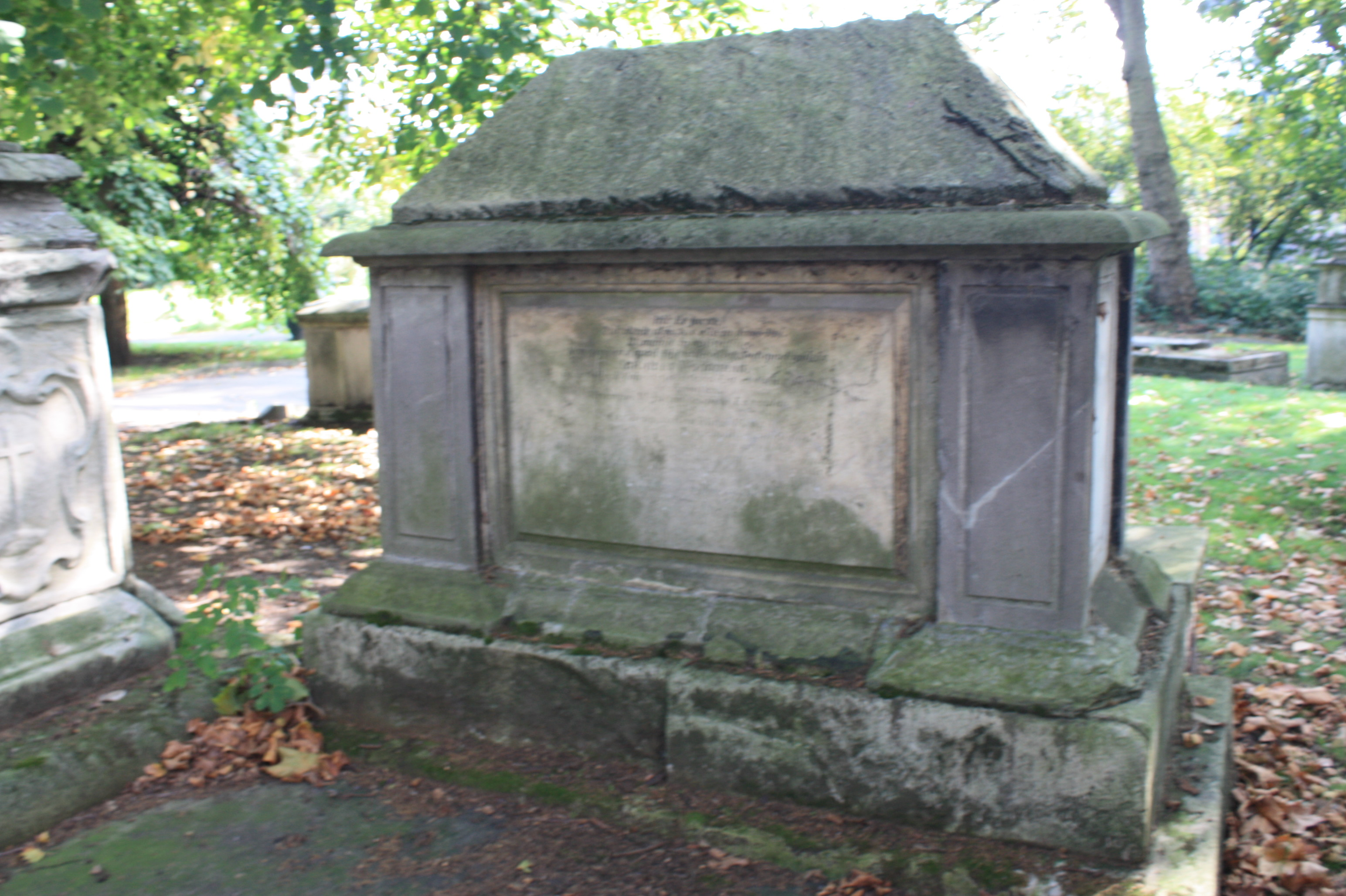
The grave of Abraham Woodhead

Other people associated with the churchyard include the poet Percy Bysshe Shelley and the future Mary Shelley, who planned their 1814 elopement over meetings at the grave of her mother, Mary Wollstonecraft, mentioned above. Charles Dickens mentions it by name in his 1859 novel A Tale of Two Cities, making it the location of body snatching to provide corpses for dissection at medical schools, a common practice at the time.

Burials in the churchyard eventually ceased under the Burial Act 1854, and St Pancras and Islington Cemetery was opened in East Finchley. In the mid-1860s, the young Thomas Hardy was in charge of the excavation of part of the graveyard in the course of the construction of the Midland Railway's London terminus, St Pancras station. More burials were removed in 2002.

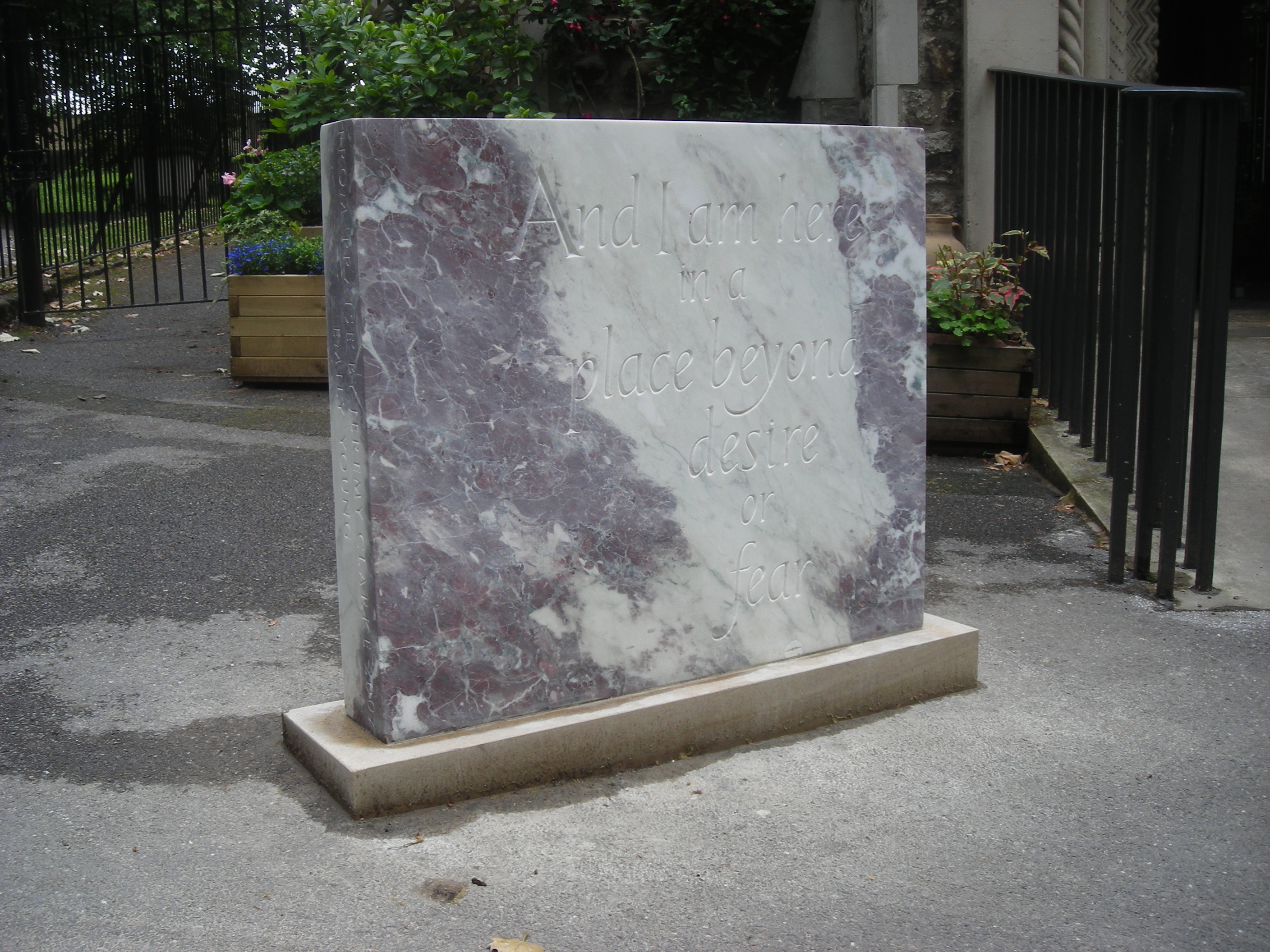
The stone installation by Emily Young and Jeremy Clarke

The churchyard was reopened in June 1877 as St Pancras Gardens, following the movement to allow conversion of disused burial grounds into public gardens. Angela Burdett-Coutts, an important local benefactress, laid the foundation stone of the memorial sundial she had presented.

A recent addition is a polished marble stone at the entrance to the church, a collaboration between and a gift from the poet Jeremy Clarke and the sculptor Emily Young. It is inscribed: "And I am here / in a place / beyond desire or fear", an extract from the long poem "Praise" by Clarke.

=== Names of note listed on the Burdett Coutts Memorial as lost ===
This impressive monument was erected in 1877 when the northern half of the churchyard was formalised as a public park, clearing most of the smaller gravestones. It lists stones lost to this and earlier clearances for the railways.

- William Brett (d.1828), artist and engraver
- Henry Burdett, goldsmith (d.1736) and ancestor of Angela Burdett-Coutts, 1st Baroness Burdett-Coutts (the probable inspiration for the monument)
- Mary Burke, wife of John Burke (genealogist), author of Burke's Peerage
- Tiberius Cavallo, physicist and philosopher
- John Danby, musician
- Arthur Richard Dillon, French archbishop (later re-interred in France)
- Rufane Shaw Donkin, military hero who committed suicide
- Chevalier d'Eon, spy and fencer
- John Flaxman, sculptor
- John Fleetwood, baronet
- Bonaventure Giffard and his father Andrew Giffard
- John Ernest Grabe, theologian
- John Gurney, judge; this grave is intact and legible but the inscription faces the boundary
- Louis Charles d'Hervilly
- Giacomo Leoni, architect
- Maurice Margarot, reformer
- Thomas Mazzinghi, father of Joseph Mazzinghi
- Arthur O'Leary, Franciscan preacher
- Pasquale Paoli, Corsican hero (later re-interred in Corsica)
- Stephen Paxton, musician
- Simon François Ravenet, engraver
- Mary Slingsby, actress
- Charles Henry Talbot, baronet
- Henry Tempest (d.1753)
- John Walker, lexicographer; this monument still survives and was independently restored by Angela Burdett-Coutts

=== Other known burials ===
See Lysons 2016

- Carl Friedrich Abel, composer
- Johann Christian Bach, composer
- Peter van Bleeck, artist
- Francis Blyth, Carmelite friar and Roman Catholic priest
- Edward Boteler (d.1681), MP for Poole
- George Chalmers, artist
- Jeremy Collier, bishop
- Timothy Cunningham (d.1789), founder of the Royal Irish Academy's Cunningham Medal
- Charles Dillon, 10th Viscount Dillon (d.1741) and Lady Dillon (d.1751) and other family members
- Thomas Dongan, 2nd Earl of Limerick
- William Franklin, son of Benjamin Franklin
- Bevil Higgons, historian
- Antoinette-Cecile de Saint-Huberty, opera singer
- Abraham Langford, auctioneer and playwright
- Thomas Mackworth (d.1744), baronet
- Joseph Richards (d.1738), baronet
- Thomas Scheemakers (1740–1808), sculptor
- Giovanna Sestini (1749–1814), opera singer
- Giambattista Tocco, Duke de Sicignano (c.1760–1793), ambassador from the Kingdom of Naples to Great Britain, committed suicide shortly after his arrival in London in 1793.
- Henry Sidgier, holder of a 1782 patent on a design for a washing machine
- Duncan Stewart of Ardsheal, clan chief
- Benjamin Turney (1755–1836), doctor trained at St Thomas. Lived for some years in Jamaica on Golden Grove Sugar Plantation.
- Joseph Wall, governor of Coree in West Africa, hanged for flogging a soldier to death
- Ned Ward, publican and comic author (no memorial)
- Samuel Webbe, composer (monument and inscription survives but its upper obelisk is missing)
- Jonathan Wild, criminal
- John Wittewrong (d.1743), baronet
- Abraham Woodhead, academic
- William Woollett, engraver (no monument, despite not being listed on the Burdett Coutts memorial as an important grave lost). Woollett certainly was important as he was nationally recognised by a memorial in Westminster Abbey.

=== Popular culture ===
According to a late 19th-century account, the legendary young poet Thomas Chatterton accidentally fell into a newly dug grave in St Pancras Churchyard, three days before his untimely death in August 1770. When helped out by his companion, he is said to have remarked, "I have been at war with the grave some time", later considered prophetic. The tale is one of many legends attached to Chatterton, and the accuracy of the story is uncertain.

On 6 July 1811, the composer and pianist Muzio Clementi married Emma Gisborne.

On 28 July 1968, The Beatles were photographed in the churchyard grounds, in a famous series of pictures designed to promote the single "Hey Jude" and the White Album. A memorial bench bears a plaque commemorating the group's "Mad Day Out".

The video for Lene Lovich's 1979 hit "Bird Song" was filmed in the church and churchyard.

The church has been a popular concert venue since 2011, with a particular focus on singer-songwriters. It has hosted artists including Sinead O Connor, Laura Marling, Brian Eno, Ron Sexsmith, Jason Mraz, Damien Jurado, Newton Faulkner, Simone Felice, Tom Odell, Ethan Johns, Lucy Rose, Sam Smith, Agnes Obel and Sleep Token.

St Pancras Old Church is frequently mentioned in the Bryant and May detective series by author Christopher Fowler.

== Sources ==
- Cansick, Frederick Teague (1869). A Collection of Curious and Interesting Epitaphs Copied from the Monuments of Noted Characters in the Ancient Church and Burial Grounds of Saint Pancras, Middlesex. London: J. Russell Smith.
- Inglis, Angela (2007). Railway Lands: Catching St. Pancras and King's Cross. Troubador. ISBN 978-1-906221-40-9.
- Lee, Charles Edward (1955). St. Pancras Church and Parish. St. Pancras Parochial Church Council.
- Lysons, Daniel (2016) [1795]. The Environs of London. Vol. 3: Being an Historical Account of the Towns, Villages, and Hamlets, Within Twelve Miles of That Capital, Interspersed With Biographical Anecdotes, County of Middlesex. Fb&c Limited. ISBN 978-1-333-76731-0.
- Palmer, Samuel (1870). St Pancras; Being Antiquarian Topographical and Biographical Memoranda Relating to the Extensive Metropolitan Parish of St Pancras. London: Samuel Palmer; Field and Tuer.
