= Samuel Webbe the younger =

Samuel Webbe the younger (1768–1843) was an English music teacher and composer.

== Life ==
The son of Samuel Webbe (1740–1816), he was born in London, and studied the organ, piano, and vocal composition under his father and Muzio Clementi.

Webbe in his active interest in glee clubs followed in the footsteps of his father, and composed many canons and glees. In 1798 he moved to Liverpool, as organist to the Paradise Street Unitarian Chapel, where John Yates (1755–1826) was minister.

Around 1817 Webbe joined John Bernard Logier in London, teaching the use of the chiroplast. There Webbe became organist to the chapel of the Spanish embassy, before returning to Liverpool, where he was appointed organist to St. Nicholas and to St. Patrick's Roman Catholic chapel. He died at Hammersmith on 25 November 1843.

== Works ==
Webbe published, with his father, A Collection of Original Psalm Tunes, 1800. He was also the author of anthems, madrigals, and glees, besides a Mass and a Sanctus, and a Chant for St Paul's Cathedral. He wrote settings for numerous songs and ballads. About 1830 he published Convito Armonico, a collection of madrigals, glees, duets, canons, and catches, by well-known composers. He also harmonised a tune by Thomas Haweis entitled "Richmond" for the hymn 'City of God, how broad and far' (New English Hymnal 346).

== Family ==
Webbe married Diana Smith in 1803. Their son Egerton Webbe (1810–1840) wrote on musical subjects; and their daughter Louisa married Edward Holmes.
