= William Knyvett (singer) =

British singer and composer (1779–1856)

William Knyvett (21 April 1779 – 17 November 1856) was a British singer and composer of the 19th century.

== Biography ==
Knyvett, third son of the musician Charles Knyvett (1752–1822), was born on 21 April 1779, most probably in London, and educated by his father, by the glee composer Samuel Webbe, and by Giovanni Battista Cimador.

In 1788 he sang in the treble chorus at the Concerts of Antient Music, and in 1795 appeared there as principal alto. In 1797 he was appointed one of the gentlemen of the Chapel Royal, and soon after a lay vicar of Westminster Abbey. He succeeded Dr. Samuel Arnold in 1802 as one of the composers of the Chapel Royal. In singing he took the alto or contra-tenor parts, invariably employing his falsetto, although his natural voice was a deep bass. He attached himself to the Harrison and Bartleman school, and became the third of a fashionable vocal triumvirate. For more than forty years he sang at the best London concerts and at the provincial festivals. Callcott's glee, "!With sighs, sweet Rose" was composed especially for him. In 1832, on the death of Thomas Greatorex, he became conductor of the Concerts of Antient Music, an office which he resigned in 1840. He was the conductor of the Birmingham festivals from 1834 to 1843, and of the York festival of 1835. With the exception of Sir George Smart, he was the last of the musical leaders who inherited the Handel traditions as to the method of conducting an oratorio.

The songs he wrote proved popular. They included "There is a flower", "My love is like the red, red rose" (1803) "The Bells of St. Michael's Tower" (1810) "The Boatie Rows" (1810), "The Midges' Dance", and "As it fell upon a day" (1812). He also wrote "When the fair rose", a glee for which he was awarded a prize at the Harmonic Society in 1800, presented to him by his steady patron, the Prince of Wales. More than 35 of his compositions were printed. His unpublished works included the grand anthem, "The King shall rejoice", produced officially for the coronation of George IV, and "This is the day the Lord has made" written for the coronation of Queen Victoria.

Knyvett impoverished himself by unsuccessful speculations. He died at Clarges House, Ryde, Isle of Wight, 17 November 1856. His second wife, whom he married in 1826, was Deborah Travis of Shaw, near Oldham. She was celebrated in her day for her knowledge of Handel's music and her superior mode of delivering it. She sang at the Concerts of Antient Music in 1813 and at the principal London concerts from 1815 to 1843. She died on 10 February 1876.
