= Burdett-Coutts Memorial Sundial =

Memorial in Old St Pancras Churchyard, London

Coordinates: 51°32′07″N 0°07′51″W

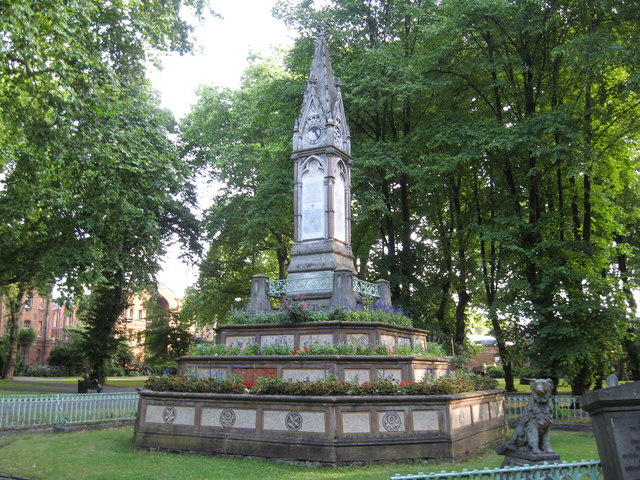
Burdett-Coutts Memorial Sundial, St Pancras Gardens, London

The Burdett-Coutts Memorial Sundial is a structure built in the churchyard of Old St Pancras, London, in 1877–79, at the behest of Baroness Burdett-Coutts. The former churchyard included the burial ground for St Giles-in-the-Fields, where many Catholics and French émigrés were buried. The graveyard closed to burials in 1850, but some graves were disturbed by a cutting of the Midland Railway in 1865 as part of the works to construct its terminus at St Pancras railway station. The churchyard was acquired by the parish authorities in 1875 and reopened as a public park in June 1877. The high Victorian Gothic memorial was built from 1877 and unveiled in 1879. The obelisk acts as a memorial to people buried near the church whose graves were disturbed; the names of over 70 of them are listed on the memorial, including the Chevalière d'Éon, Sir John Soane, John Flaxman, Sir John Gurney, and James Leoni.

The monument was designed by George Highton of Brixton. It was manufactured by H Daniel and Co, a firm of masons from Highgate, and includes relief carvings by Signor Facigna. It comprises a tall square tower in a decorated Gothic style, topped by a tall Portland limestone pinnacle bearing a sundial, supported by columns of pink Shap granite and grey Cornish granite to either side of four inscribed marble plaques, each topped by a trefoil Gothic arch around a relief sculpture (busts of two saints, St Giles and St Pancras, and of two allegorical figures depicting a youthful Morning with a cockerel and a more aged Night with a star and a crescent moon). The inscriptions on four marble panels include the Beatitudes from the Gospel of St Matthew, chapter 5, verses 3 to 9, and a religious poem.

The tower stands on a square plinth of Portland stone, which rests on an octagonal base of three steps made from red Mansfield sandstone. The steps are decorated with mosaic panels, mostly stylised flowers. The structure is surrounded by iron railings which create a square enclosure, with a Portland stone animal statue at each of the four corners, two lions and two dogs. The dogs may be modelled on Greyfriars Bobby, or possibly an animal owned by Burdett-Coutts herself. The railings also bear a plaque to Johann Christian Bach, buried in a pauper's grave nearby.

The monument became a Grade II listed building in February 1993, upgraded to Grade II* in September 2016. The garden is itself Grade II listed, and includes the tomb of Sir John Soane. St Pancras Old Church is also Grade II* listed.

== Names on the memorial ==
- Charles Louis Victor De Broglie (1765–1849)
- Chevalier d'Éon French Minister Plenipotentiary (1728–1810)
- Joseph Franz Xaver von Haslang (c.1700–1783)
- Louis Charles d'Hervilly, Marshal of France (1756–1795)
- Paschalis De Paoli, President of the Corsican Republic (1725–1807)
- Comte de Pontcarre (c.1746–1810)
- Comte des Escotais (1746-1812)
- Michael Joanned Baptista, Baron De Wenzel, Occulist to the Court of Hungary (died 1790)
- Charles Dillon, 10th Viscount Dillon (1701–1741) and Frances, Lady Dillon (1670–1751)
- Arthur Richard Dillon, Archbishop of Narbonne (1721–1806)
- Lieutenant General Sir Rufane Shaw Donkin GCH KCB FRS FRGS (1772–1841)
- Miss Frances Doughty (1691–1763) daughter of Sir Henry Tichborne
- Guy Henry Marie Du Val, Marquis de Bonneeval (died 1863)
- Reverend Joseph Duncan (died 1797)
- Sidly Effendi, Ambassador of the Ottoman Empire to the United Kingdom (died 1811)
- John Flaxman, sculptor (1755–1826)
- Sir John Fleetwood, 5th Baronet (died 1741)
- Phillippo Nepumuceno Fontanae, Ambassador from the Court of Sardinia to Spain (died 1793)
- Francis Pietri Fozano (c.1748–1838)
- Claude Joseph Gabriel, Viscount Le Vaulx, Marshal of France (died 1809)
- Bonaventure Giffard, Roman Catholic bishop (1642–1734) and Andrea Giffard (died 1714)
- John Ernest Grabe, Anglican divine (1666–1711)
- Antoine Francoise, Comte de Gramont (died 1795)
- Sir John Gurney, Baron of the Exchequer (1755–1845)
- Samuel Harrison, singer (1760–1812)
- The Hon Esme Howard of Norfolk, youngest son of Henry Howard, 15th Earl of Arundel, (1647–1728) and his wife Margaret Zukn (1646–1716)
- Jean Francois Lamarche, Count La Marche, Bishop and Count of Leon (1729–1806)

North West side:

- His Excellency Phillip St Martin Count De Front (died 1812)
- Morris Leivesley, 54 years Secretary of the Foundling Hospital (died 1849)
- James Leoni architect (1686–1746)
- Count Ferdinand Luchesse, Envoy from Naples (died 1790)
- Andres Marshall, physician (died 1813)
- Maurice Margarot, radical political reformer (1745–1815), and his wife Elizabeth, (died 1841)
- Thomas Mazzinghi, (died 1775), violinist father of Joseph Mazzinghi, the composer
- The Hon Isaac Ogden (died 1819)
- Father O'Leary, (1729–1802)
- Don Joseph Alonzo Ortiz, Consul General of Spain (c.1753–1813)
- Stephen Paxton, musician (1734–1787)
- Peter Pasqualino, musician (died 1766)
- Madeline Antoinetter Pulcherie, Marquise de Tourville, (1756–1837)
- Senora Dona Maria Manuela Rapaol, native of Cordova (died 1839)
- Simon François Ravenet, engraver (1706–1764)
- Lady Slingsby, actress (fl. 1670–1685–1693)
- Sir John Soane RA FSA FRS, architect of the Bank of England (1753–1837)
- Jeremiah Le Souef for 20 Years Vice Consul of the United States (c.1783–1837)
- Sir Charles Henry Talbot, 1st Baronet, his wife and other members of the Talbot family (1720–1798)
- Sir Henry Tempest, 3rd Baronet (died 1753)
- Manoel Viera, Portuguese merchant (died 1783)
- John Walker author of the Pronouncing Dictionary (1732–1807)
- Edward Walpole (died 1740)
- Sir John Webbe (c.1760–1797) and his wife Barbara (died 1740)

North East side:

- Rt. Hon. Mary Dowager Lady Abergavenny (died 1699)
- Francis Claud Amos (died 1800)
- Hon Thomas Arundell (1696–1752) and his wife Anne (died 1778)
- Claude Bigot de Sainte-Croix, Minister Plenipotentiary for the King of France in Sweden (1744–1803)
- Lady Bowyer relict of Sir William Bowyer, Bt. (died 1802)
- William Brett, artist (died 1828)
- Henry Burdett, goldsmith (died 1736)
- Mary Burke, wife of John Burke, author of The Peerage (died 1846)
- The Hon Elizabeth Butler, daughter of Marmaduke Langdale, 5th Baron Langdale of Holme (died 1823)
- Rt. Hon. Elizabeth, Countess of Castlehaven, daughter of Henry Arundell, 5th Baron Arundell of Wardour (1693–1743)
- Tiberius Cavallo, Scientist (1749–1809)
- The Hon. Amy Constable, daughter of Hugh Clifford, 2nd Baron Clifford of Chudleigh (1705–1731)
- Catherine Constable (1762–1783)
- William Cummings, General of HM Forces (1761–1833)
- John Danby, composer, (1757–1798)
- Alexandre-César d'Anterroches, Bishop of Condom (died 1793)
- Joseph Cayetano De Bernales, Spanish merchant (c.1751–1825), and his wife Elizabeth, (1791–1823)
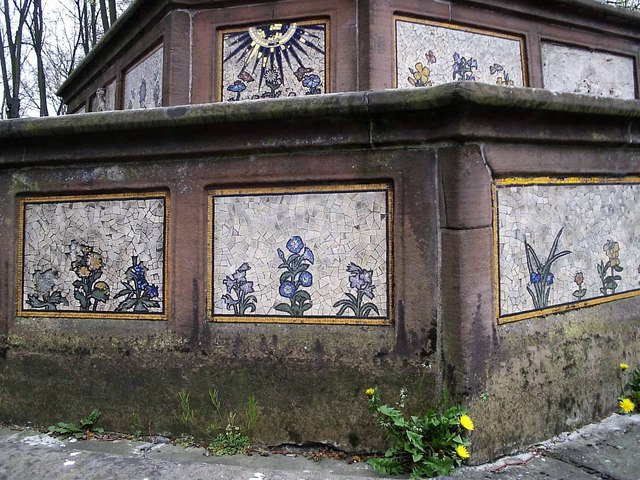
Detail of mosaics

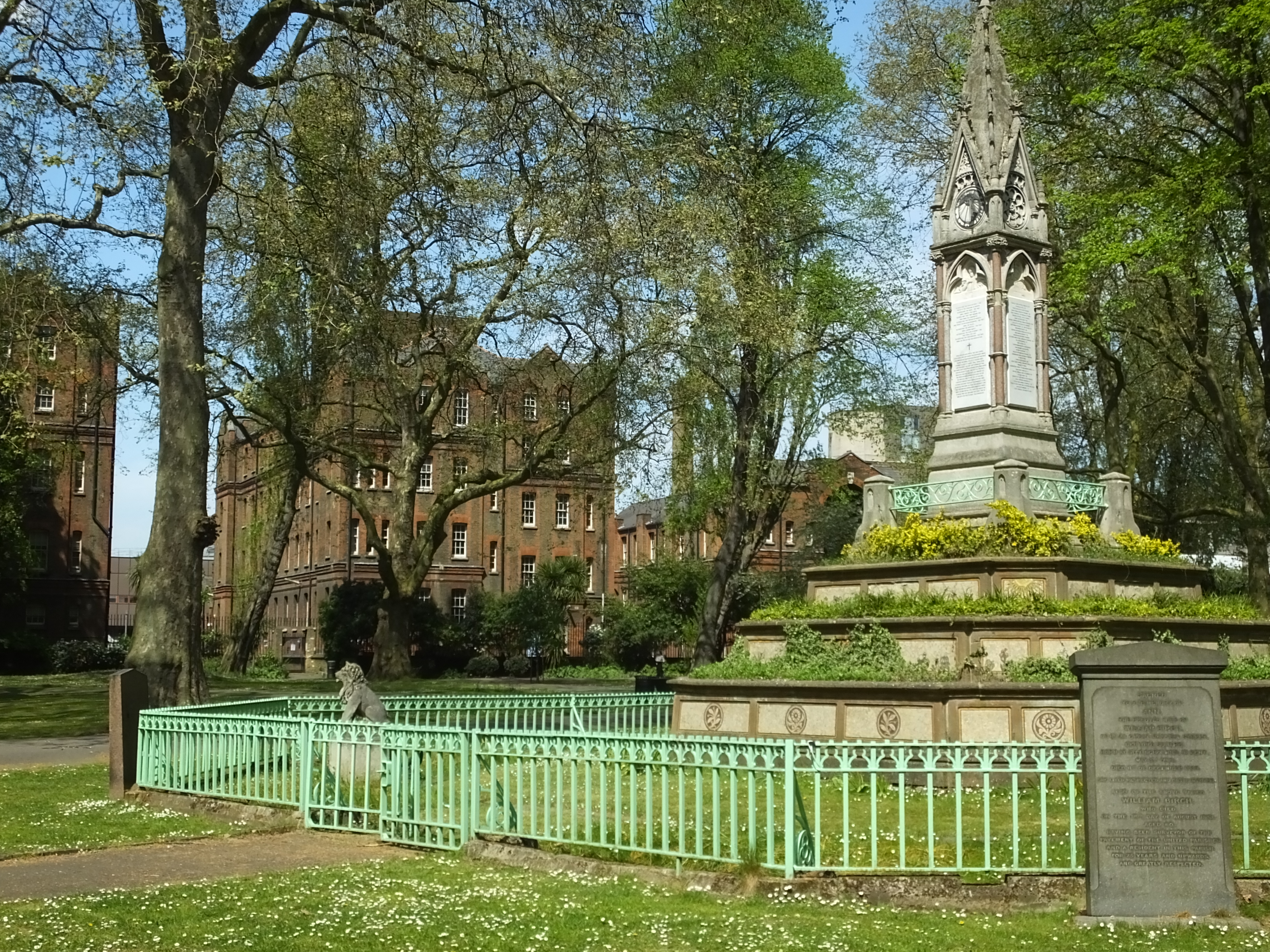
Railings

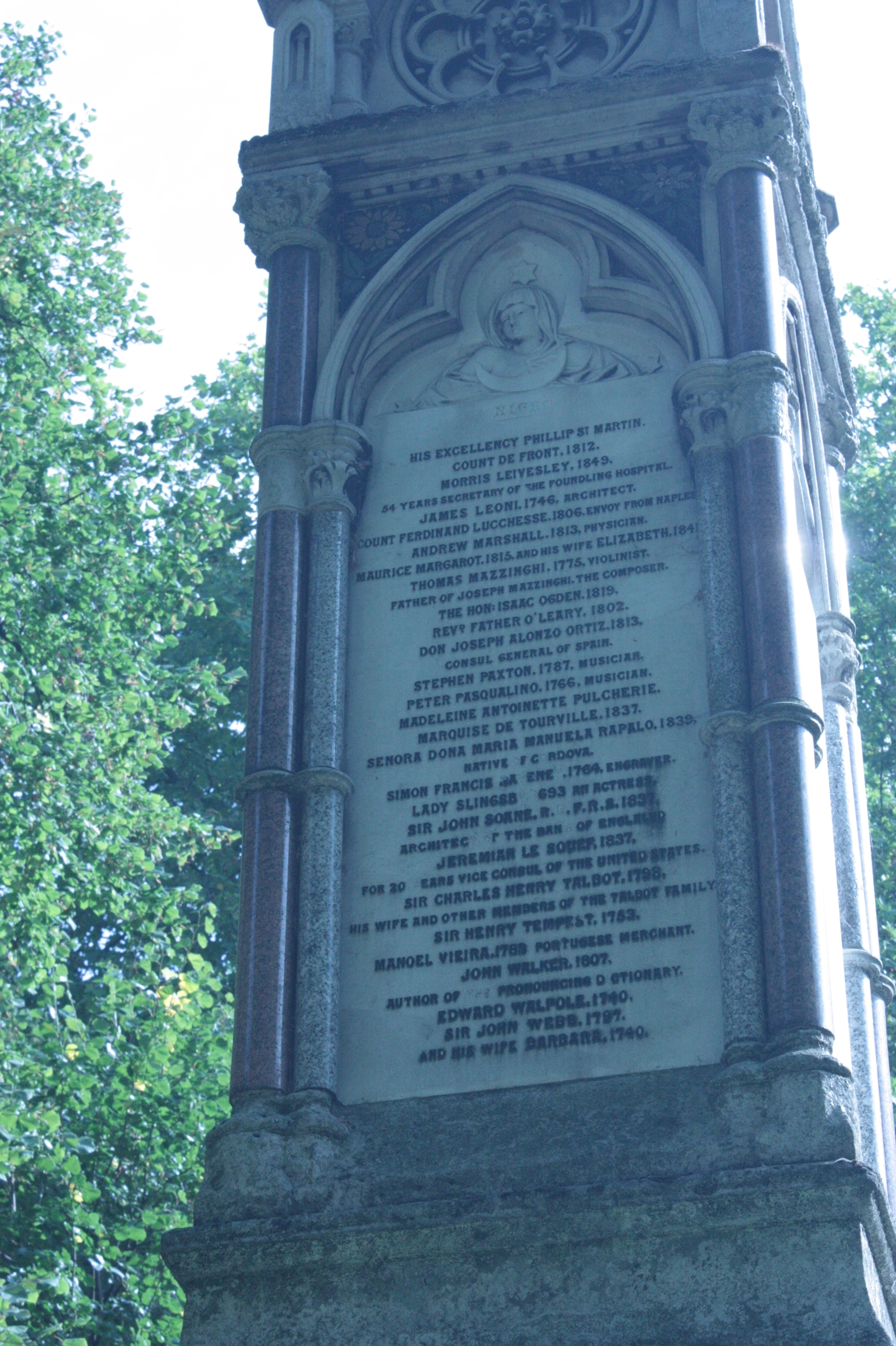
Inscription and bust of Night

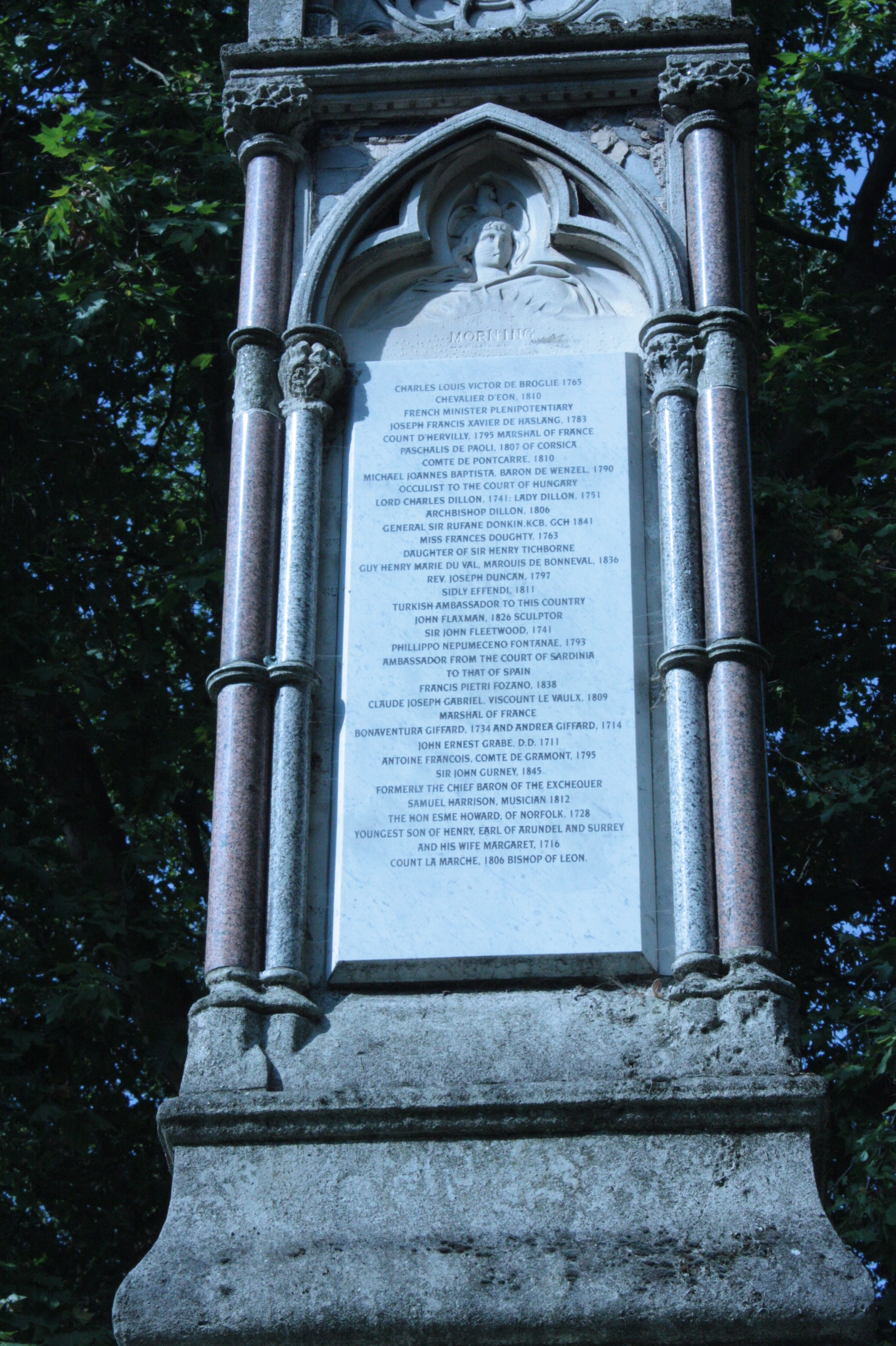
Inscription and bust of Morning

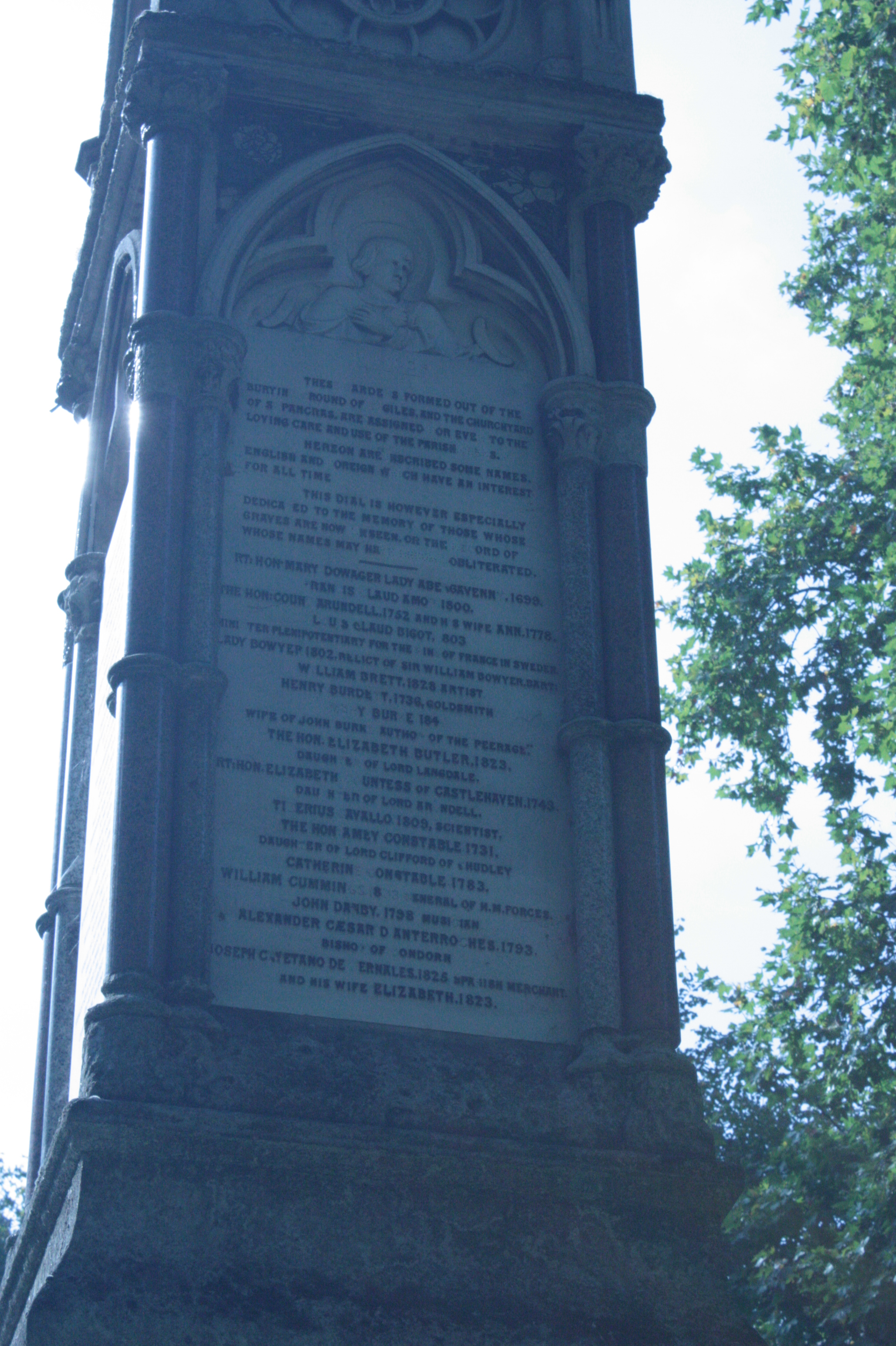
Inscription and bust of St Giles
