= Thomas Ludford Bellamy =

English singer and theatre manager

- Born: 1770; London
- Died: 3 January 1843; London

Thomas Ludford Bellamy (1770–1843) was an English singer, also for a time a theatre manager.

== Life ==
The son of Richard Bellamy, he was born in St. John's parish, Westminster. He learned singing and music from his father and Benjamin Cooke, and after his voice had broken from Elisa Taccani Tasca.

In 1784 Bellamy sang amongst the trebles at the Handel commemoration in Westminster Abbey, and in 1791 at Drury Lane. Irish property had been bequeathed him by his maternal grandfather in 1776, and in 1794 he went to Ireland. In 1797 he was in Dublin, where he acted as stage manager at the theatre; but in 1800 he bought shares in the Manchester, Chester, Shrewsbury, and Lichfield theatres. Three years later he sold his interest in these undertakings, and became sole proprietor of the Belfast, Londonderry, and Newry theatres.

Not succeeding in the theatre, Bellamy returned to London, where he obtained an engagement to sing at Covent Garden Theatre for five years. In 1812 he was engaged for a similar period at Drury Lane. After that he started an academy of music on the Logerian system. In 1819 he obtained the appointment of master of the choir of the Spanish Embassy's chapel. Two years later he succeeded James Bartleman as principal bass singer at the Concerts of Antient Music.

Bellamy died 3 January 1843.

== Works ==
Bellamy published a song book in 1840, in the tradition of Richard Clark.

== Notes ==
Attribution

This article incorporates text from a publication now in the public domain: Stephen, Leslie, ed. (1885). "Bellamy, Thomas Ludford". Dictionary of National Biography. Vol. 4. London: Smith, Elder & Co.
