= Richard Clark (musician) =

English musician and writer

Richard Clark (1780–1856) was an English musician and writer.

== Life ==
Clark was born at Datchet on 5 April 1780; his mother Elizabeth (b. abt 1753) was a daughter of John Sale the elder (b. 1724 Gainsborough, according to his Grave Stone at St Georges Chapel, Windsor) a lay clerk of St. George's Chapel, Windsor, where Clark was admitted at an early age as chorister, under Theodore Aylward. He also sang at Eton College, under Stephen Heather.

In 1802, on the death of his grandfather, Clark succeeded him as lay clerk at St. George's Chapel and Eton College, holding both appointments to 1811. In 1805 he was appointed secretary of the Glee Club, and about the same period occasionally acted as deputy at the Chapel Royal for James Bartleman; at St. Paul's Cathedral for his uncle John Sale; and at Westminster for his cousin, John Bernard Sale. On 3 July 1814 he was elected a member of the Royal Society of Musicians.

On 1 October 1820 Clark was appointed a gentleman of the Chapel Royal, in the place of Joseph Corfe. He also acted as deputy-organist for J. Stafford Smith. In 1827 he became a vicar choral of St. Paul's Cathedral and in the following year a lay clerk at Westminster Abbey. He advocated that the singing men and choristers of cathedrals should regain ancient privileges, of which over time they had been deprived.

During his life, Clark kept a scrapbook which is held at the Westminster Abbey Archives. This large scrapbook with a blue outer covering contains letters, and details of various committee meetings held concerning the planning of the Coronation of William IV, George IV, Queen Victoria, and the Installation of the Knights of the Bath.

Clark died suddenly at the Litlington Tower, Westminster Abbey, on 5 October 1856.

== Marriage and Family ==
Clark's first wife was Jane Wright also born in 1780. By Jane, Richard had five daughters and one son.

Caroline Francis b. 1804

Sophia Louise b. 1805; d. 1861

Emma Jane b. 1806

Harriet b. 1809

Susanna b. 1812

Richard Spencer b. 1814; d. 1818

Clark's first wife Jane died in 1821 at the age of 41.

On 30 December 1822 Clark married his second wife Harriot Batkin b. 1795.

== Works ==
In 1814 Clark published a collection of poetry selected from the glees and catches sung at the Catch Club and other similar meetings. In the preface to this book was an account of God Save the King, the British national anthem, in which the authorship was attributed to Henry Carey. A second edition appeared in 1824, in which this account was omitted, two years after Clark had started a controversy as to the authorship of the national anthem by publishing a pamphlet upon the subject, in which he attributed it to the Elizabethan composer John Bull.

In 1836 Clark brought out Reminiscences of Handel. In it he claimed that the air known as The Harmonious Blacksmith had been sung by a blacksmith at Cannons, near Edgware, of the name of Powell, and overheard by Georg Frideric Handel. He set up memorials to Powell, and bought an anvil on which (he claimed) the blacksmith accompanied his song.

In 1841 Clark returned to the subject of John Bull, and issued a prospectus for the publication of all the extant works of the Elizabethan composer. In 1843 he published an arrangement of an organ or virginal Miserere of Bull's, to which he fitted words; it was performed at Christ Church, Newgate Street, on 3 August 1843, before the King of Hanover.

In 1847 Clark advocated the erection of a monument to William Caxton; his letters on this subject to the Sunday Times were republished in pamphlet form. In 1852 he printed a short essay on the derivation of the word "madrigal". Clark was also the composer of a number of anthems.

== Notes ==
Attribution

This article incorporates text from a publication now in the public domain: Stephen, Leslie, ed. (1887). "Clark, Richard (1780-1856)". Dictionary of National Biography. Vol. 10. London: Smith, Elder & Co.
