= Richard Bellamy (singer) =

English bass singer and composer

Richard Bellamy (1743?–1813) was an English bass singer and composer. One of the chief bass singers of his day, his career included appointments at the Chapel Royal, St. Paul's Cathedral and Westminster Abbey.

== Career ==
Bellamy was appointed a Gentleman of the Chapel Royal on 28 March 1771 and a lay vicar of Westminster Abbey on 1 January 1773. In 1777 he became a vicar choral of St. Paul's Cathedral, and from 1793 to 1800 he was also almoner and master of the choristers there. Among his pupils at St. Paul's Cathedral was the future organist of Westminster Abbey, George Ebenezer Williams.

In 1784 he was one of the principal basses at the Handel Commemoration at Westminster Abbey. He gave up all his appointments in 1801, and died on 11 September 1813.

He published a few sonatas, a collection of glees and a Te Deum with orchestral accompaniment.

== Family ==
Bellamy married Elizabeth Ludford, and their son, the singer Thomas Ludford Bellamy, inherited considerable property from her father, Thomas, who died in 1776.

Cultural offices
Preceded by Robert Hudson	Almoner and Master of the Choristers of St Paul's Cathedral; 1793–1800	Succeeded by John Sale
