= John Eager (disambiguation) =

John Eager may refer to:

- John Eager (1782–1853?), English organist
- John Eager, drummer on The London Boys

== See also ==
- Johnny Eager, film
- John Eager Howard
