= William Hutchins Callcott =

English composer and organist

William Hutchins Callcott (1807 – 5 August 1882) was an English organist, composer and arranger of music.

== Life ==
Callcott, born in Kensington in 1807, was a younger son of the musician John Wall Callcott, and nephew of the painter Augustus Wall Callcott. As a child he received some instruction from his father, and later continued his studies under his brother-in-law, William Horsley. On 4 July 1830 he was elected a member of the Royal Society of Musicians.

Callcott was for some years organist of Ely Place Chapel, and was the composer and arranger of songs and glees. In the latter part of his life he suffered much from ill-health. He died in Kensington on 5 August 1882, and was buried on the 9 August at Kensal Green Cemetery.

He married Mary Stuart. Their son, Robert Stuart Callcott (1851–1886), showed great promise as an organist and musician but died in the spring of 1886 at an early age. Their daughter Emma Stuart Callcott married the Irish painter George Bernard O'Neill. Their son was the composer Norman O'Neill.

== Publications ==
Callcott published in 1836 an abridgement of his father's Musical Grammar, in 1840 a collection of psalm and hymn tunes for Edward Bickersteth's Christian Psalmody, and in 1843 The Child's own Singing Book. In the latter work he was assisted by his wife Maria, who was the author of religious stories. In 1851 he published Remarks on the Royal Albert Piano (exhibited at the International Exhibition of that year), and in 1859 A few Facts on the Life of Handel.

Callcott composed several songs, glees, and anthems, but his name was principally known by his arrangements and transcriptions for the piano, which amount to many hundred pieces.
