= John Ewen =

British songwriter

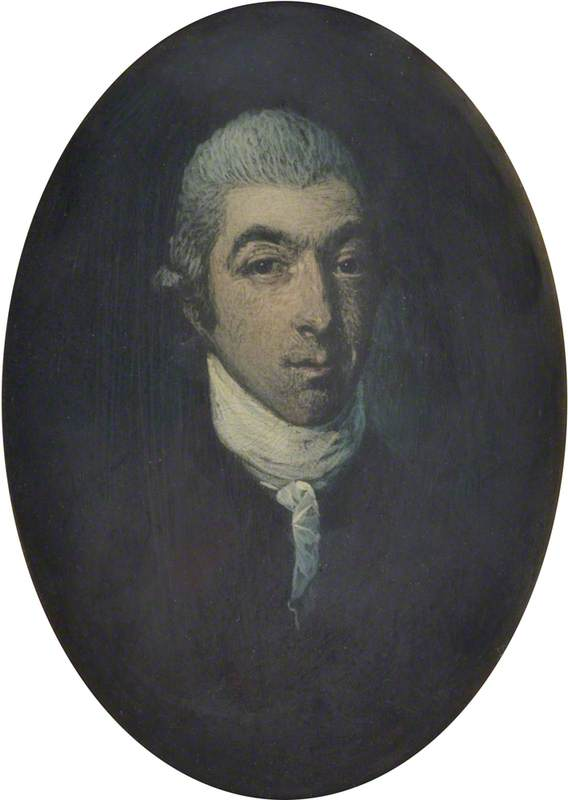
John Ewen, portrait miniature

John Ewen (1741–1821) was a Scottish songwriter, credited with the authorship of the well-known Scottish song, "The Boatie Rows".

== Life ==
Ewen was born in Montrose to poor parents, and received little education. He moved in 1762 to Aberdeen, where he opened a successful hardware shop. He married in 1766 Janet Middleton, one of two daughters of a yarn and stocking maker; she died shortly after giving birth to a daughter. Ewen came into one half of his father-in-law's property.

== Death and estate ==
Ewen died on 21 October 1821, leaving, after the payment of various sums to the public charities of Aberdeen, about £14,000 to found a hospital in Montrose, similar to Robert Gordon's Hospital in Aberdeen, to educate boys. The will was challenged by the daughter's relations, and after conflicting decisions in the Scottish court of session was appealed to the House of Lords; who, on 17 November 1830, set aside the settlement on the grounds of imprecision.

== The Boatie Rows (Roud number 3095) ==
"O weel may the boatie row" was published anonymously in James Johnson's Scots Musical Museum. It was characterised by Robert Burns: "It is a charming display of womanly affection mingling with the concerns and occupations of life. It is nearly equal to "There's nae luck about the house"." Trevor Royle is of the view that it was probably based on part of an earlier song; Peter Buchan found a matching stanza in an old ballad. It was arranged as a glee, for three voices, by William Knyvett.
