= John Sale (singer) =

English bass singer and composer

John Sale (1758 – 11 November 1827) was an English bass singer of church music, and a singer and composer of glees.

== Life ==
He was born in London in 1758, the son of John Sale (1734–1802). From 1767 to 1775 Sale was a chorister of St George's Chapel, Windsor Castle and of Eton College, and of both was lay vicar from 1777 to 1796. In 1788 he was appointed gentleman of the Chapel Royal, in 1795 vicar choral of St Paul's Cathedral, and in 1796 lay vicar of Westminster Abbey.

In 1800 he succeeded Richard Bellamy as Almoner of St Paul's and Master of the Choristers, which posts he held until 1812. In 1818, becoming senior gentleman or father of the Chapel Royal, he was excused further duty and attendance.

Sale sang as soloist and in concerted music at many concerts and cathedral festivals. From 1789 to 1814 his name appeared in the programmes of the Concerts of Antient Music. He was also interested in glee-singing: he conducted the Glee Club, and in 1785 became honorary member, and in 1812 secretary, of the Noblemen and Gentlemen's Catch Club. He was much sought after as a teacher.

He died in Westminster on 11 November 1827, and was buried on 19 November at St Paul's Cathedral.

The obituary in The Quarterly Musical Magazine & Review commented that "... very few of his contemporaries possessed so sound a judgment in musical compositions, especially vocal, or manifested on all occasions so much taste and discrimination.... As a vocal performer, Mr. Sale was eminently distinguished; united to a rich, full and mellow bass voice, his taste was of the good old English school, strictly pure and carefully adapted to the subject...."

His obituary in The Harmonicon noted: "His aid was generally required in those charming glee parties which were formerly so much the fashion, where his smooth, agreeable voice, and subdued manner of using it, rendered him a valuable assistant."

== Family ==
Two sons had musical careers: John Bernard Sale (1779–1856) was a bass singer, and organist at St Margaret's, Westminster; George Charles Sale (1796–1869) was organist at St Mary's, Newington and later at St George's, Hanover Square. A granddaughter, Lydia Sophia Sale (died 1869) was also a composer and assistant organist at St. Margaret’s, Westminster.

== Compositions ==
Sale published, about 1800, A Collection of New Glees, including six original numbers for three and four voices: "My Phillida, adieu", "Thyrsis, the music of that murmuring spring", "With an honest old friend", "No glory I covet", "With my jug of brown ale" and "Sometimes a happy rustic swain". He also edited Lord Mornington's glees.

Cultural offices
Preceded by Richard Bellamy	Almoner and Master of the Choristers of St Paul's Cathedral; 1800–1812	Succeeded by William Hawes
