= Luffman Atterbury =

English carpenter, builder and musician

Luffman Atterbury (died 1796), was an English carpenter, builder and musician.

Atterbury studied the harpsichord, composition, and harmony in the leisure time he could spare from his business, which was carried on in Turn Again Lane, Fleet Market. He acquired considerable proficiency in music, and on the death of his father, being left tolerably well off, gave up his business and retired to Teddington. He obtained several prizes from the Catch Club for his glees, and was appointed a musician in ordinary to George III.

On 15 May 1765, Atterbury was elected a performing member of the Madrigal Society. In 1770, he seems to have been connected with Marylebone Gardens, as he paid Chatterton five guineas for the copyright of 'The Revenge' on 6 July of the same year in which the burletta was performed. On 5 May 1773, he produced at the Haymarket theatre an oratorio, 'Goliah' which failed disastrously, though it was afterwards repeated at West Wycombe on 13 Aug. 1775, on the occasion of the burial of the heart of Paul Whitehead in the mausoleum of Lord Le Despencer. 'Goliah' was also performed at the Birmingham Triennial Music Festival in 1784.

In 1784 Atterbury sang in the chorus of the Handel commemoration, and in 1787, on the establishment of the glee club at the Newcastle Coffee House, Castle Street, Strand, his name occurs as one of the original members. In September 1790 he married Miss Ancell, of Downing Street. He was at this time still living at Teddington, but his improvidence forced him to remove to Marsham Street, Westminster, and to give concerts in aid of his finances. It was in the middle of one of these concerts that he is said to have died, 11 June 1796.
