= John Eager =

English organist

John Eager (1782–1853) was an English organist who taught the pianoforte by a controversial system designed by Johann Bernhard Logier making use of the chiroplast, a teaching instrument. This system was one of the first to allow the teaching of a large number of students at once, and was heavily criticized by conservative musicians, at least partly out of a fear of the creation of a central teaching institution, which would rob them of pupils. Between 1803 and 1833, he taught music in Yarmouth, England.

== Early life ==
Eager was born in 1782 in Norwich, where his father was a manufacturer of musical instruments. He learned the basics of music from his father, and progressed so quickly that at twelve he attracted the attention of the Duke of Dorset, who took him to Knowle as a page. At Knowle took advantage of the library to educated himself, and likely also acquired skill upon the violin, at which the duke was an amateur. Towards the end of the century the duke became insane, and Eager, for whose support no provision had been made, ran away to Yarmouth, where he began teaching music. Soon afterwards he married Miss Barnby, a lady of good fortune, and in October 1803 was appointed organist to the corporation of Yarmouth on the death of John Roope.

== Music teachings ==
In 1814 Johann Bernhard Logier patented his ‘chiroplast,’ a teaching tool made to hold the hands in the correct position while playing the pianoforte. He also created a system of teaching with this invention as a key part, which was one of the first to teach many pupils at once: twelve or more of the pupils were required to play simultaneously on as many pianos. This system was ardently taken up by Eager. The adherents of the new method were vehemently attacked by conservative musicians, and Eager came in for a full share of abuse in the Norfolk papers. These widespread attacks were at least partially caused by musicians' worries that the practice of teaching many students at a time would rob them of students. However, he gradually convinced a considerable number of people of the excellence of the system, which, in addition to the use of the chiroplast, claimed to teach the ground work of harmony much more rapidly and thoroughly than any other method. He opened a ‘musical academy for music and dancing,’ at the Assembly Rooms, Norwich, in the conduct of which he was assisted by his daughters. Public examinations were in due course held for the purpose of convincing the audience of the genuineness of the method.

On 18 June 1819, after the second of these examinations Eager published 'A Brief Account' with accompanying examples of what was actually done at the second examination of Mr. Eager's pupils educated upon Logier's system. This account was addressed to Major Peter Hawker and published by Hunter in St. Paul's Churchyard. The appendix to the account contains certain letters written to, but not published in, the ‘Norwich Mercury’ and the ‘Norfolk Chronicle’ by people who considered that the opinions on the chiroplast method expressed by those papers were unfair. Eager's reputation does not appear to have suffered; ten years afterwards he is spoken of in the highest terms by the writer of the ‘History of Norfolk,’ and then held the post of organist to the corporation.

== Later life ==
In 1833 Eager left Norwich for Edinburgh, Scotland, where he resided until his death about twenty years later. He separated from his wife, by whom he had two daughters, Mrs. Bridgman and Mrs. Lowe, before leaving England; obtained a Scotch divorce about 1839, and afterwards married a Miss Lowe, sister of his second daughter's husband. He wrote pianoforte sonatas, as well as some songs and glees.
