= John Danby (musician) =

English composer

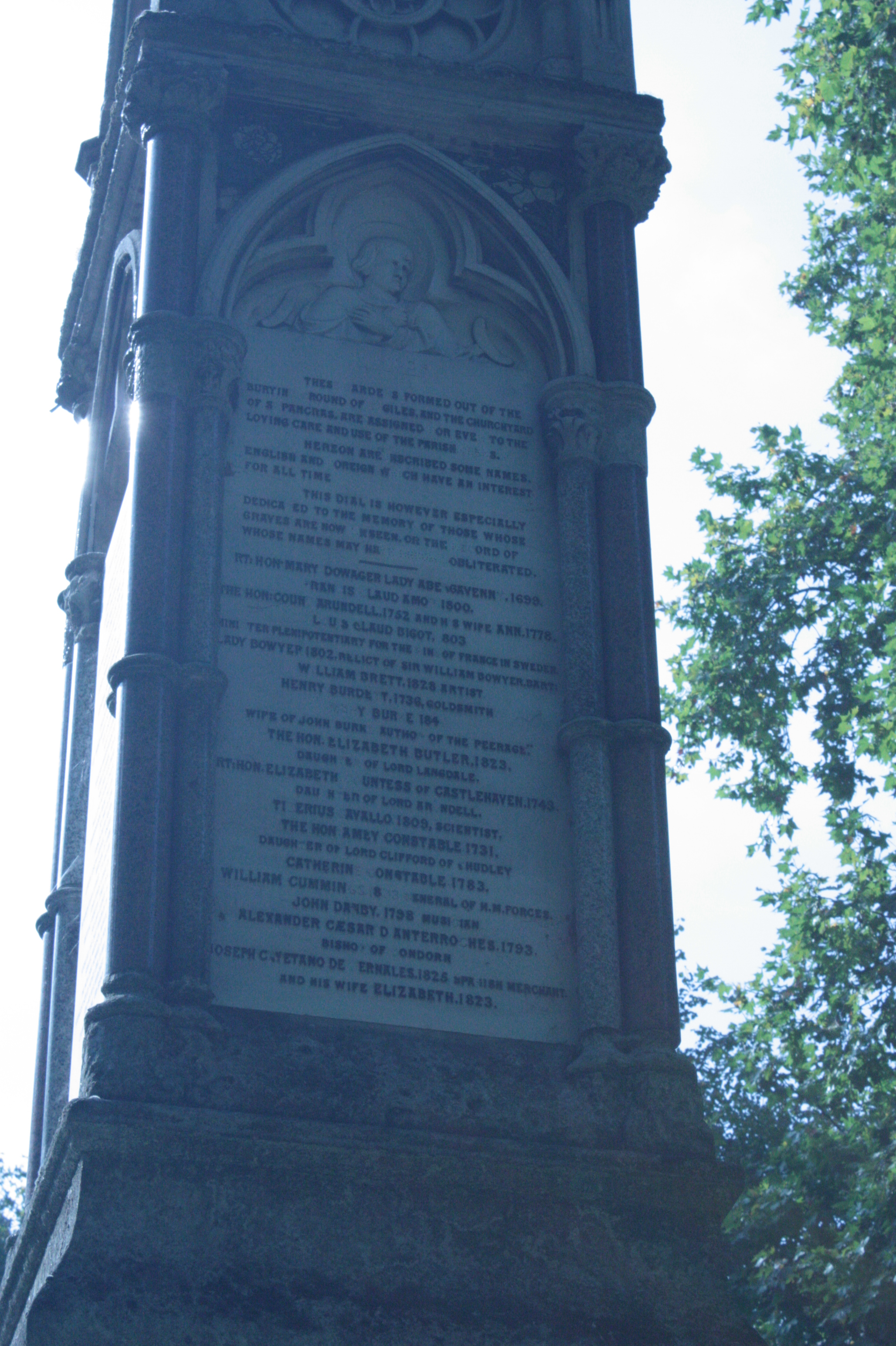
The Burdett Coutts memorial, Old St Pancras. Danby's name is near the bottom

John Danby (1757 – 16 May 1798) was an English composer of glees, of which he wrote around 92, some of which were only published after his death. Among the most popular of his glees are Awake, AEolian lyre! and Let Gaiety Sparkle. He won 10 prizes for his compositions from the Catch Club between 1781 and 1794. He was a pupil of Samuel Webbe and a friend of Turner. For many years he was employed as the organist at the chapel of the Spanish Embassy in London. However near the end of his life he suffered from paralysis of the limbs.

He died at the age of 41 during a benefit concert which had been arranged for him by his friends. They used the money raised to erect a monument to him in the Old St. Pancras cemetery. The monument was lost or removed during the 19th century but his name is listed on the Burdett Coutts memorial in the graveyard, listing the eminent graves lost.
