= Stephen Paxton =

British violoncellist and composer

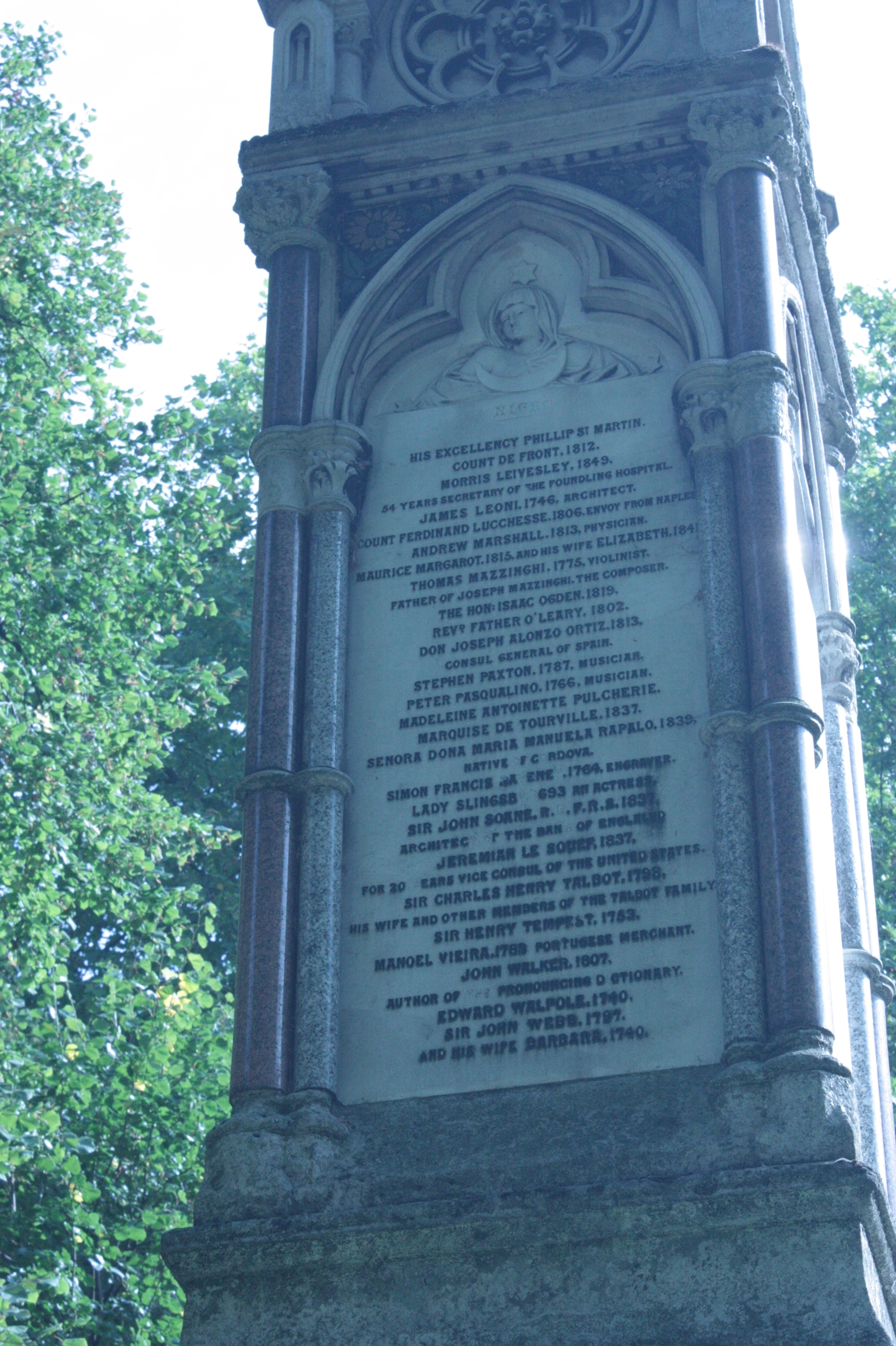
Paxton's name on the Burdett-Coutts Memorial, Old St Pancras Churchyard, London (detail)

Stephen Paxton (born in Durham, 27 December 1734; died in London, 18 August 1787) was an 18th-century cellist and composer.

He is remembered along with his brother, William Paxton (1737–1781), for the composition of numerous pieces for the cello, most notably glees. Due to imprecise attribution methods of the time, the works of the two brothers are often confused or improperly attributed.

Paxton won London Catch Club prize medals for his glees How Sweet, How Fresh (1779), Round the Hapless (1781), Ye Muses Inspire Me (1783), and Blest Pow'r Here See (1784).

Paxton is listed as one of the lost graves to eminent persons on the Burdett-Coutts Memorial in Old St. Pancras Churchyard in London.

== Scores ==
- IMSLP
