= Philip Hayes (composer) =

English composer, musician and conductor

Philip Hayes (baptised 17 April 1738 – 19 March 1797) was an English composer, organist, singer and conductor.

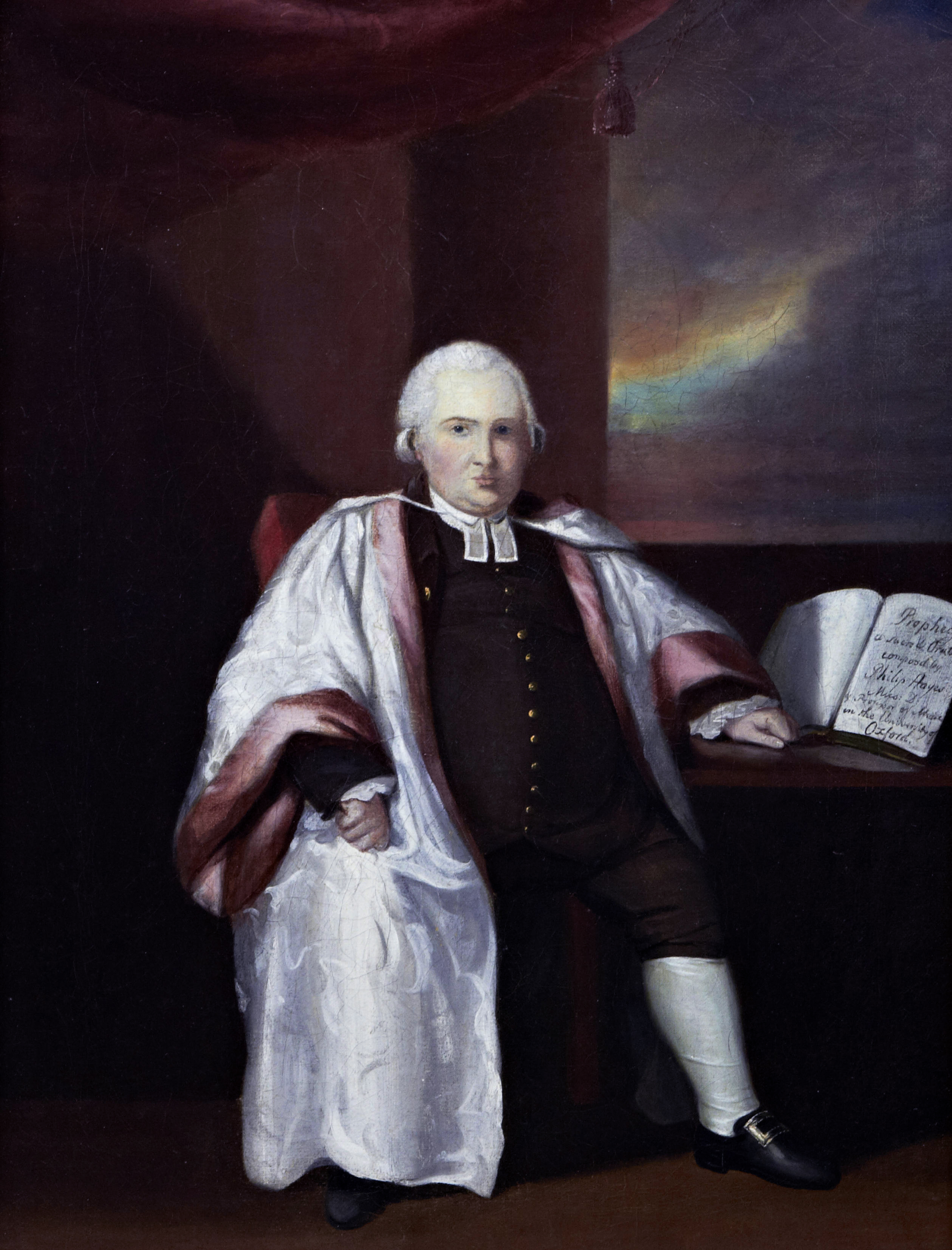
Philip Hayes

== Life and career ==
Hayes was born in Oxford. His early musical education was overseen by his father William Hayes. He was awarded the degree of B.Mus in 1763 for the masque Telemachus and received his doctorate in 1777. He sang at the Chapel Royal in London from 1767, but returned to Oxford in 1776 to take up the post of organist at New College, Oxford and to assist his ailing father, whom he succeeded as Heather Professor of Music in 1777. He also replaced him as organist of Magdalen College, Oxford, and the University Church, and added the post of organist at St John's College in 1790.

His professorial ‘lectures’ took the form of specially composed odes and oratorios which were performed in the Oxford Music School. In 1780 he was appointed conductor of the annual Festival of the Sons of the Clergy held at St Paul's Cathedral, and in 1791 he presided over Haydn’s visit to Oxford. As a conductor, he was one of the first English musicians to use a roll of paper with which to beat time but he was best known for his difficult personality and corpulence. His frequent trips to London in a post chaise did not go unnoticed by the Oxford wags who had little difficulty in punning a nickname from 'Phil Hayes' – thus he was fondly known as 'Fill Chaise'. A cartoon of him, entitled simply '--- From Oxford', was etched by Philippe Jacques de Loutherbourg in 1790 (see right).

Hayes's musical language combined a respect for late Baroque idioms as practiced by composers such as Handel, together with a clear grasp of early classical styles. He was also interested in the music of earlier generations – notably Purcell and his contemporaries – and added considerably to the wide-ranging music library inherited from his father. His works show an imaginative approach to instrumentation: from 1763 he made frequent use of clarinets, and his six keyboard concertos (1769) were the first published in England to offer the option of performance on the early piano. Hayes died in London, aged 58. After his death the manuscripts of his unpublished music, along with the works of his father, were passed to the Bodleian Library, Oxford.

A manuscript copy of four volumes of music by Purcell, copied by Hayes directly from Purcell's original manuscripts, survives at Tatton Park, a National Trust house near Knutsford in Cheshire. The manuscripts came to Tatton after the sale of the library of Samuel Arnold in 1803; they were purchased by the book collector Mark Masterman-Sykes, who gave them to his sister Elizabeth Sykes shortly after her marriage to Wilbraham Egerton of Tatton Park in 1806.

There is a memorial to Hayes in the crypt at St Paul's Cathedral.

== Main published works ==
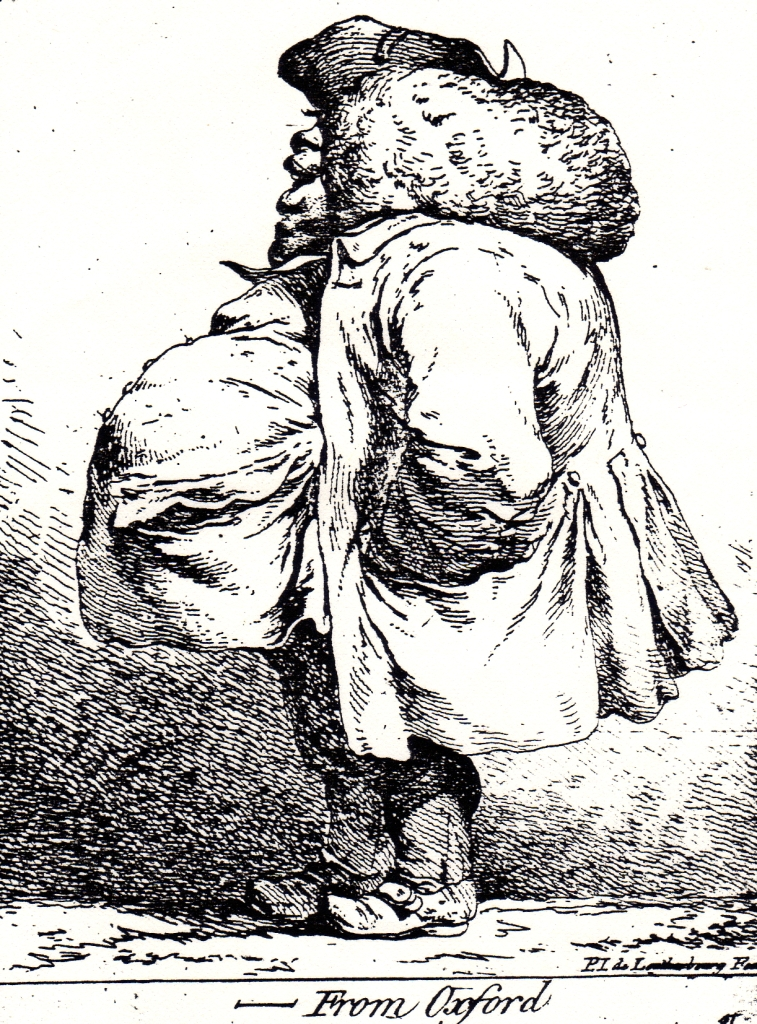
Satyrical depiction of Philip Hayes (1790)

- Six Concertos, 'for the Organ, Harpsichord or Forte-Piano', (London, 1769)
- Six Sonatas, 'for Harpsichord or Pianoforte with an accompaniment for Violin', op.2, (London, 1774)
- The Muses Delight, Catches, Glees, Canzonets and Canons (London, 1786)
- Sixteen Psalms, (Oxford, 1788)
- Catches and Glees: The Muses Tribute to Beauty (London, 1789)
- Eight Anthems, (Oxford, 1803)
- Over 20 songs issued separately between 1769 and 1794

== Discography ==
- Organ Concerto No. 2 in B flat, Stephen Farr, London Bach Consort, 1995, (Meridian CDE 84295)
- Piano Concerto No. 4 in A major, Paul Nicholson, Parley of Instruments, 1993, (Hyperion: Helios CDH55341)
- Piano Concerto No. 4 in A Major, David Owen Norris, Sonnerie, 2002, (Avie AV0014)

== Bibliography ==
- Heighes, Simon. The Lives and Works of William and Philip Hayes, Garland Press (Outstanding Dissertations in Music from British Universities), New York, 1995.
- H.D. Johnstone and R. Fiske (eds.). Music in Britain: the Eighteenth Century (Oxford, 1990).
- Shaw, Watkins. The Succession of Organists, Oxford, 1991.
