= Carl Barbandt =

German musician and composer

Stephan Carl Philipp Barbandt (1716 – after 1775), known as Charles Barbandt in England, was a German musician and a minor composer. He was baptised on 30 April 1716 in Hanover and died in London sometime after 1775. He was the eldest child of court musician Bartholomäus Barbandt (1687-1764). Carl Barbrandt was employed as the organist at the Bavarian Embassy Chapel in London from 1764. He was one of the first clarinet players in England and also played the oboe, the flute and the organ. His 1766 collection Sacred Hymns, Anthems and Versicles was the first Catholic music published in England since William Byrd's Gradualia. He is best known as the man who recognised Samuel Webbe's talent and who provided him with his musical education. He composed six sonatas op.1, six sonatas for the harpsichord op.5 and six symphonies op.6.
