= George William Martin =

- Born: 8 March 1828; London
- Died: 16 April 1881 (aged 53) Wandsworth
- Genres: glee
- Occupation: composer

George William Martin (8 March 1828 – 16 April 1881) was an English musical composer.

== Life and career ==
He was born in London. He began his musical studies as a chorister at St. Paul's Cathedral, under William Hawes, and was one of the choir boys at Westminster Abbey at the coronation of Queen Victoria.

He became professor of music at the Normal College for Army Schoolmasters; was from 1845 to 1853 resident music-master at St. John's Training College, Battersea, and was the first organist of Christ Church, Battersea, opened in 1849. In 1860 he established the National Choral Society, by which he maintained for some years at Exeter Hall an admirable series of oratorio performances. In connection with these performances he edited and published cheap editions of the oratorios and other works that were then not readily accessible to the public. In 1864 he organised a choir of a thousand voices for the Macbeth music at the 300th anniversary of Shakespeare's birth. He had a special aptitude for training school children, and conducted the National Schools Choral Festival at the Crystal Palace in 1859.

As a composer his genius lay in the direction of the madrigal and part-song; and from the publication of his prize glee, 'Is she not beautiful?' in 1845 onwards few years passed in which he did not win distinction from some of the leading glee and madrigal societies of the country, for which he won numerous prizes. The tune 'Leominster,' associated with Horatius Bonar's hymn 'A few more years shall roll,' is one of his best-known compositions. Martin, owing to intemperance, sank from 'a position which at one time gave him a claim to be regarded as one of the elements of musical force in the metropolis' (as quoted in Musical Record). He died, quite destitute, at Bolingbroke House Hospital, Wandsworth, and was buried in Woking cemetery by the parish.
