= Hibernian Catch Club =

The Hibernian Catch Club is a dining and catch musical club founded c.1680 in Dublin, Ireland by the vicars-choral of Christ Church and St. Patrick's Cathedrals. It has been referred to as the oldest surviving musical society in Europe.

Membership was historically exclusive, restricted until 1770 to members of the vicars-choral. Participation was expanded in the late eighteenth century, but membership is limited, members still have to be appointed by committee, and have included many prominent members of the Irish nobility, gentry, and professions.
