= William Paxton (musician) =

English composer and cellist

William Paxton (1737–1781) was an English composer and cellist. He composed several sets of duets and solos for the cello, including six duos for two cellos (Op. 1), eight duos for violin and cello (Op. 2), six solos for violin (Op. 3), four solos for violin and two for the cello (Op. 4), twelve easy lessons for cello (Op. 6). and six solos for cello (Op. 8). Paxton's brother Stephen also composed for the cello. Paxton won prizes for two canons: "O Lord in Thee" (1779), and "O Israel, trust in the Lord" (1780). His glee, "Breathe soft, ye winds", was also a favourite for many years.

Breathe soft, Ye winds

Breathe soft, ye Winds; ye Waters, gently flow.
Shield her, ye Trees; ye Flow'rs, around her grow.
Ye Swains, I beg ye, pass in silence by.
My Love in yonder Vale asleep doth lie.
