= George Ebenezer Williams =

English organist and composer (1783–1819)

George Ebenezer Williams (30 August 1783 − 17 April 1819) was an English organist and composer.

== Life and works ==
Born at Clerkenwell Green in London, Williams sang as a chorister at St Paul's Cathedral in London, studying with Robert Hudson and Richard Bellamy, before serving as assistant organist at the Temple Church under Richard Stevens and at Westminster Abbey under Samuel Arnold. In 1805 he was appointed organist at the Philanthropic Society chapel.

From 1814 until 1819 Williams served as Organist and Master of the Choristers of Westminster Abbey.

He began composing chant settings by the age of 12, and his later works included other church music and compositions for piano. He was the author of An Introduction to the Art of Playing on the Pianoforte and Exercises for the Pianoforte.

In a letter dated 30 September 1809, he was among those described by Samuel Wesley as "pygmy puerile puppies".

His students included James Turle.

== Family and death ==
With his with Eliza, he had one daughter, Isabelle, born in 1817.

Following his death in office at the age of 35, he was buried in the south cloister of Westminster Abbey on 24th April 1819, but no monument or gravestone was erected in his memory.

Williams had been a collector of musical manuscripts. A copy of Spem in alium by Thomas Tallis was among the manuscripts from his library sold at auction after his death.
