= Walker's Rhyming Dictionary =

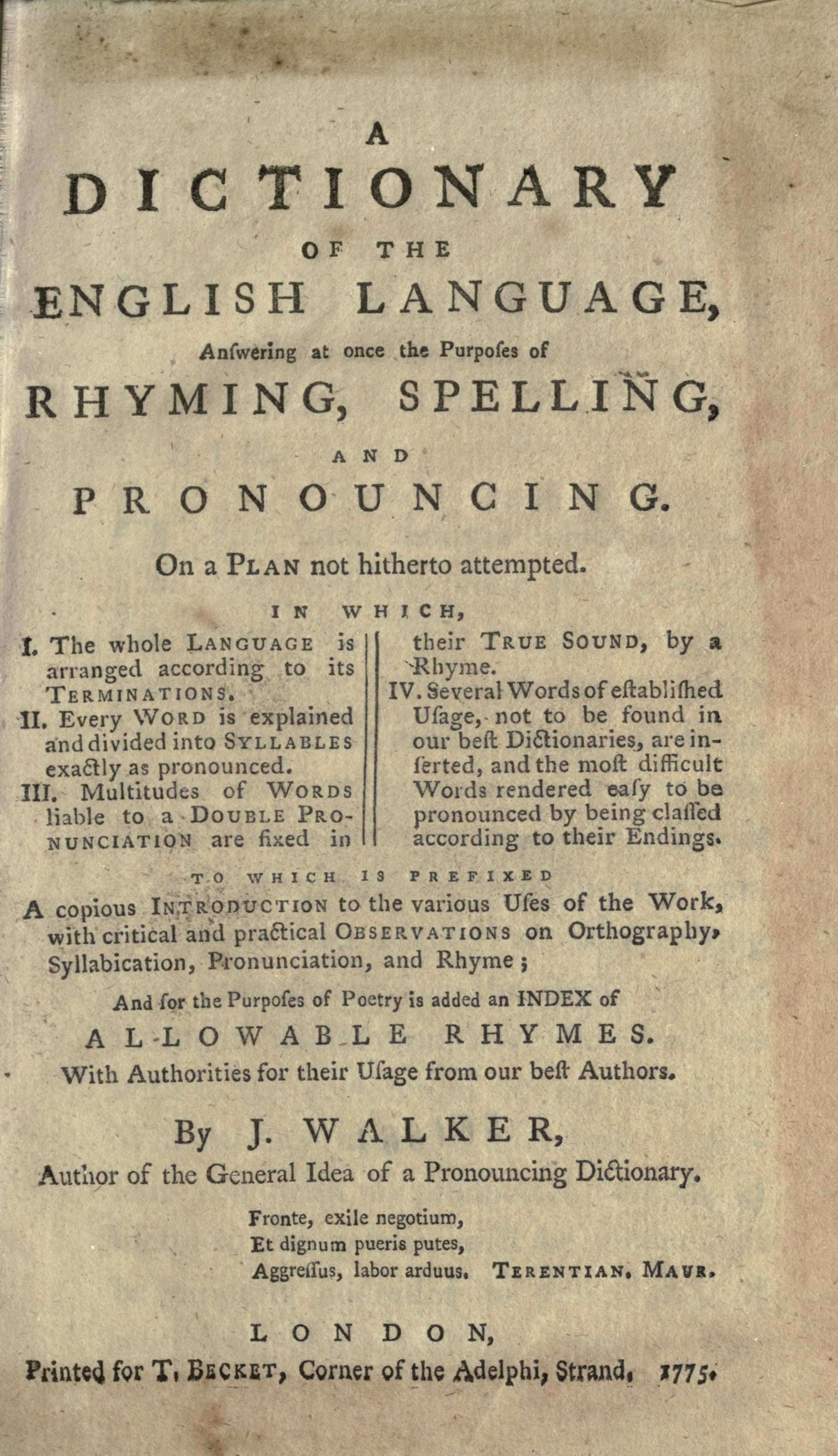
Title page of the first edition.

Walker's Rhyming Dictionary (originally titled Dictionary of the English Language, Answering at Once the Purposes of Rhyming, Spelling and Pronouncing) was made by John Walker and published in 1775. It is an English reverse dictionary, meaning that it is sorted by reading words in reverse order. As spelling somewhat predicts pronunciation, it also functions as a rhyming dictionary.

Laurence H. Dawson in his Preface to the ‘Revised and Enlarged edition’ of Walker’s dictionary from 1924 notes that: "Though it was never in the true sense a dictionary of rhymes, has been for over one hundred and fifty years a standard work of reference and has been a friend in need for generations of poets and rhymesters from Byron downwards." Originally, Walker stated that the main purpose of his dictionary was to "facilitate the orthography and pronunciation of the English language". Dawson instead found that it would more likely be useful to poets, phoneticians, "the enthusiast for some new system of Simplified Spelling", and solvers of "Acrostics".

Walker's original 1775 edition of the dictionary contained 34000 words, and Dawson's expanded twentieth-century edition added approximately 20000 more words to the volume. Michael Freeman's 1983 supplement enlarged the dictionary further, choosing to include slang and an increased numbers of words without Anglophone origins, for example, in the first 10 entries in his supplement include Arabic, Brazilian, Egyptian, Tatar and African words (p. 551). Proper nouns are not, by and large, covered by the dictionary, although some exceptions are made "for a number the pronunciation of which are not self-evident". It also has some Scots words, including callant, hogmanay, wrongous, een, tolbooth, and wis/wist (although it is not a regular word)..

The dictionary's use by untalented poets was mocked in Byron's 1817 poem Beppo (stanza LII):

But I am but a nameless sort of person,
(A broken Dandy lately on my travels)
And take for rhyme, to hook my rambling verse on,
The first that Walker's Lexicon unravels,
And when I can't find that, I put a worse on,
Not caring as I ought for critics' cavils...
