= John Walker (lexicographer) =

English stage actor, philologist, and lexicographer (1732–1807)

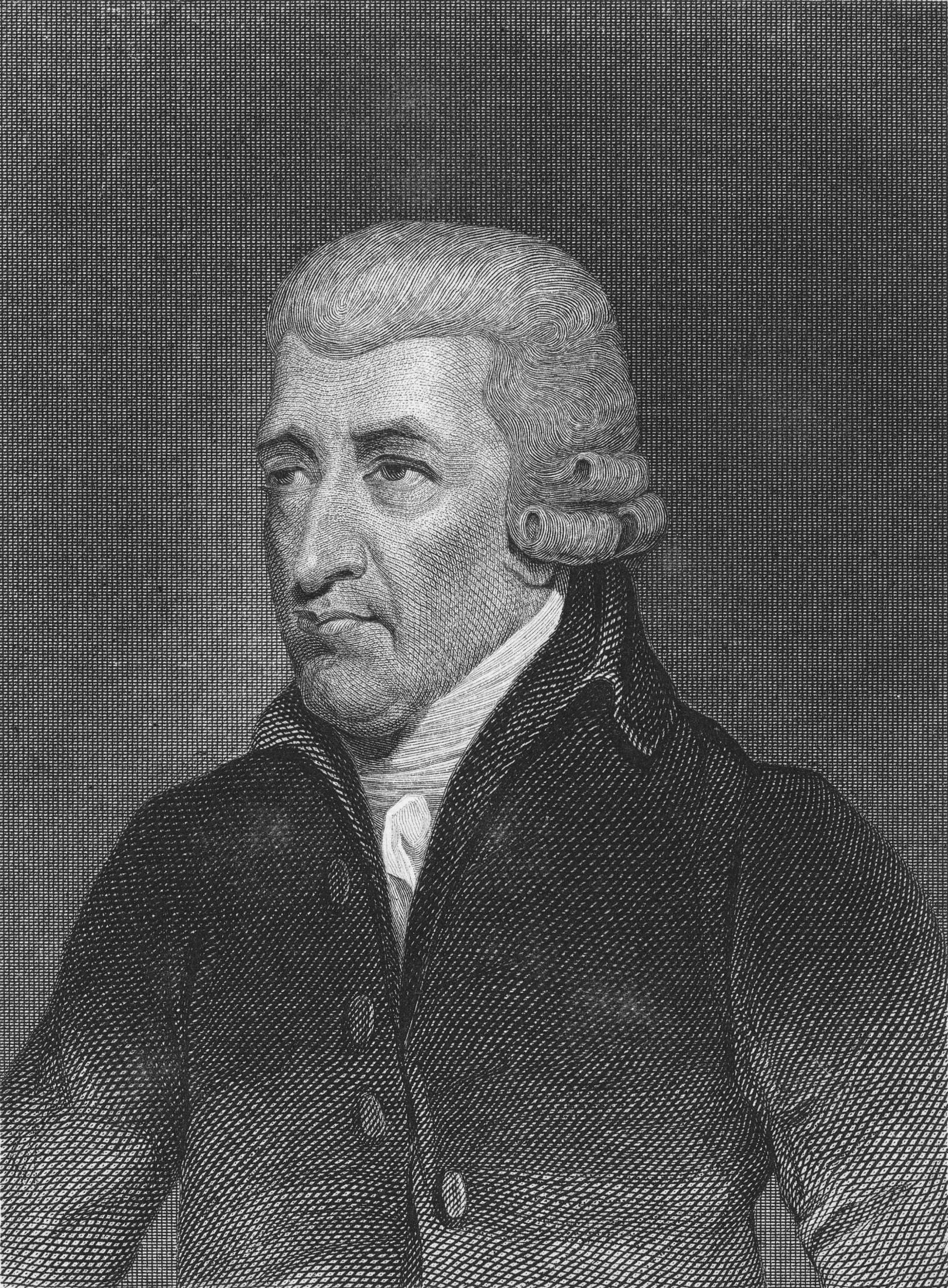
- Born: March 18, 1732; Colney Hatch, Middlesex, England
- Died: August 1, 1807 (aged 75); London, England
- Occupation: lexicographer
- Notable work: Rhyming Dictionary (1775); Critical Pronouncing Dictionary (1791)

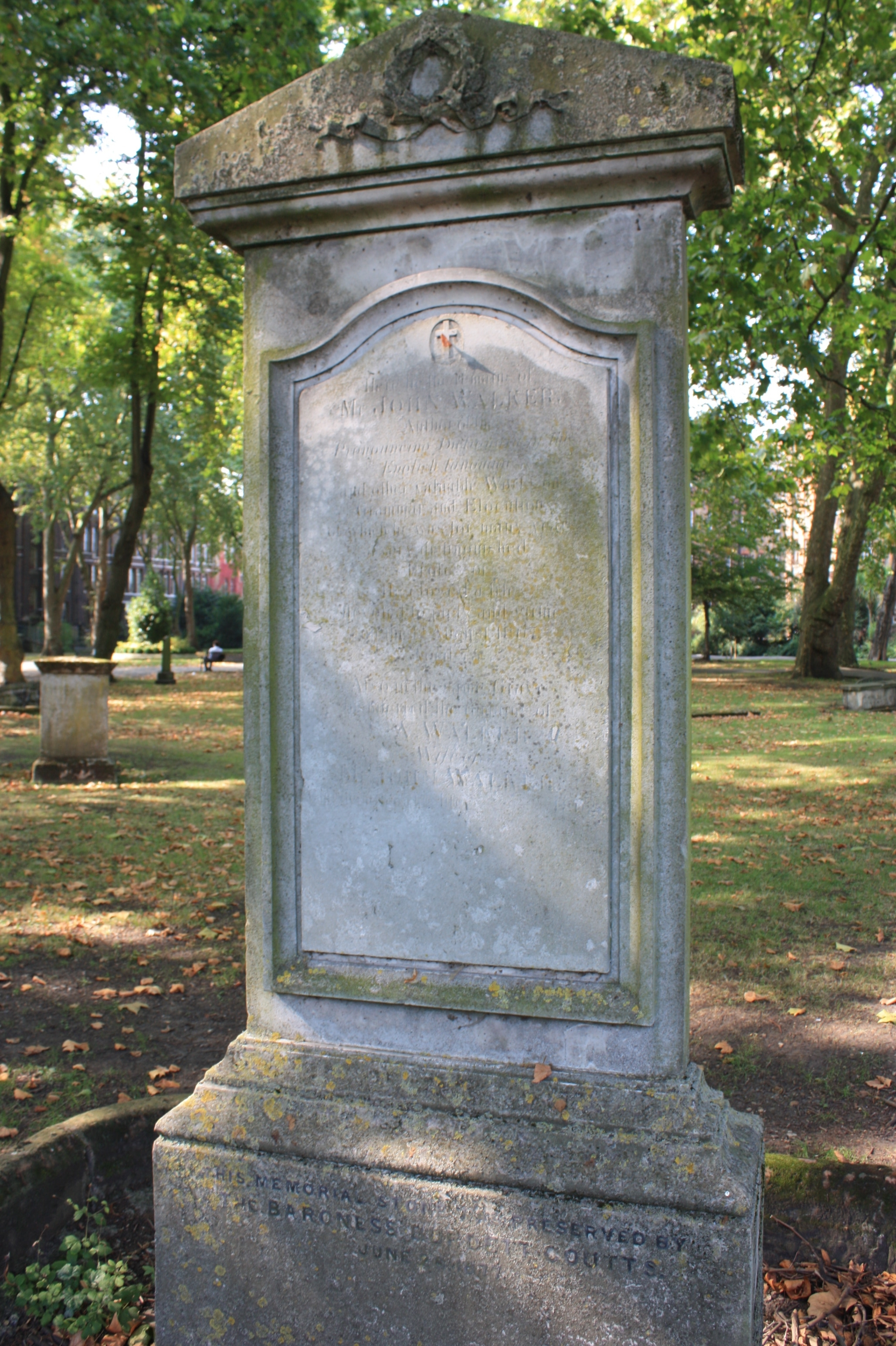
John Walker's grave, Old St Pancras Churchyard, London

John Walker (18 March 1732 – 1 August 1807) was an English stage actor, philologist and lexicographer.

== Life ==
Early in life Walker became an actor, his theatrical engagements including one with David Garrick at Drury Lane, and a long season in Dublin, Ireland. In 1768 he left the stage.

After running a school at Kensington, Walker began to teach elocution, and this became his principal employment for the rest of his life. He was the friend of the leading literary men of his time, including Samuel Johnson and Edmund Burke.

Walker is buried in Old St Pancras Churchyard in London, just east of the small church, to the north side of Sir John Soane's distinctive monument. The grave was fully restored by Baroness Burdett Coutts in 1877.

== Works ==
In 1775 Walker published his Rhyming Dictionary, which achieved a great success, and was often reprinted. His Critical Pronouncing Dictionary (1791) achieved an even greater reputation, and had some 40 editions.
