= Louis des Escotais =

French diplomat and field marshal (born 1746)

Louis des Escotais, Count of Escotais, Lord of Chantilly, was born in 1746, at the castle of la Roche des Escotais (France) and died in London in 1812. He was diplomat and a field marshal in the armies of Louis XVI.

He is the nephew of Louis-Joseph des Escotais, Lieutenant General under Louis XVI, Grand Hospitaller of the Order of Malta, and Governor of the Île de Ré.

== Biography ==
=== Family origins ===
Louis des Escotais comes from an ancient French aristocratic family. The first of the des Escotais, Thibault, participated in the Third Crusade in 1191 alongside Richard the Lionheart, and Louis's lineage is proven up to Guillaume II des Escotais who lived in 1280.

His father, Roland des Escotais, a lieutenant general in the king's armies, was granted the erection of his lands into the county of Escotais by royal letters patent from King Louis XV in 1755.

=== His life ===
Louis-Jacques-Roland des Escotais was born on November 2, 1746, in the family château of La Roche des Escotais, one of the Loire Valley châteaux. He was the second child and principal heir among three siblings.

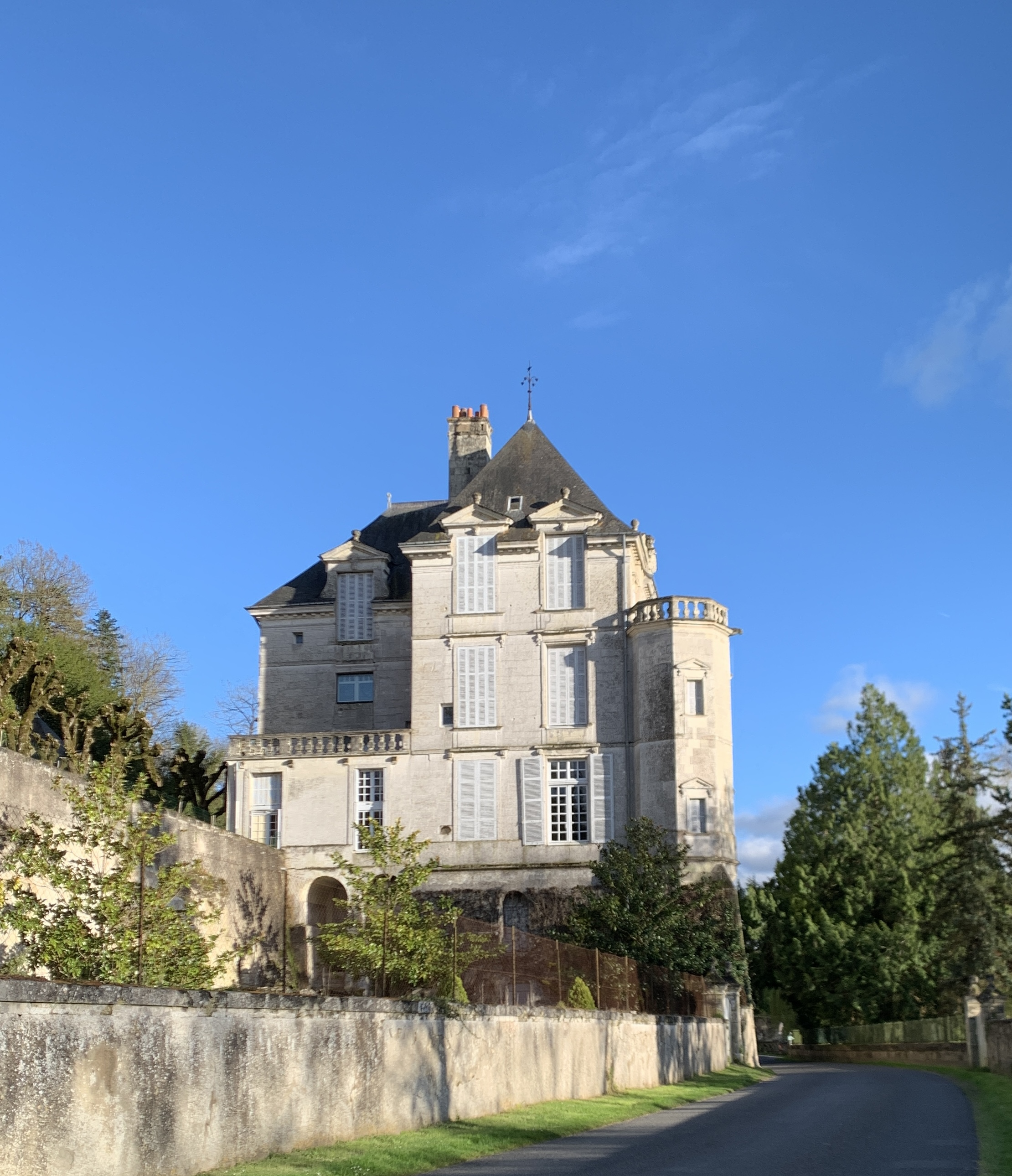
Castle of la Roche des Escotais (Loire Valley - France)

His father, Roland des Escotais, led a distinguished life at the court of King Louis XV in Versailles, earning him the Honneurs de la Cour on April 20, 1767. This was one of the most prestigious noble distinctions reserved for the oldest noble families distinguished on the battlefield.

On June 26, 1771, at the age of 24, he married Marie-Louise de Plas, a lady-in-waiting to Sophie of France and then to Adélaïde of France. King Louis XV, future King Louis XVI, Marie-Antoinette his wife and the entire royal family honored him by signing his marriage contract.

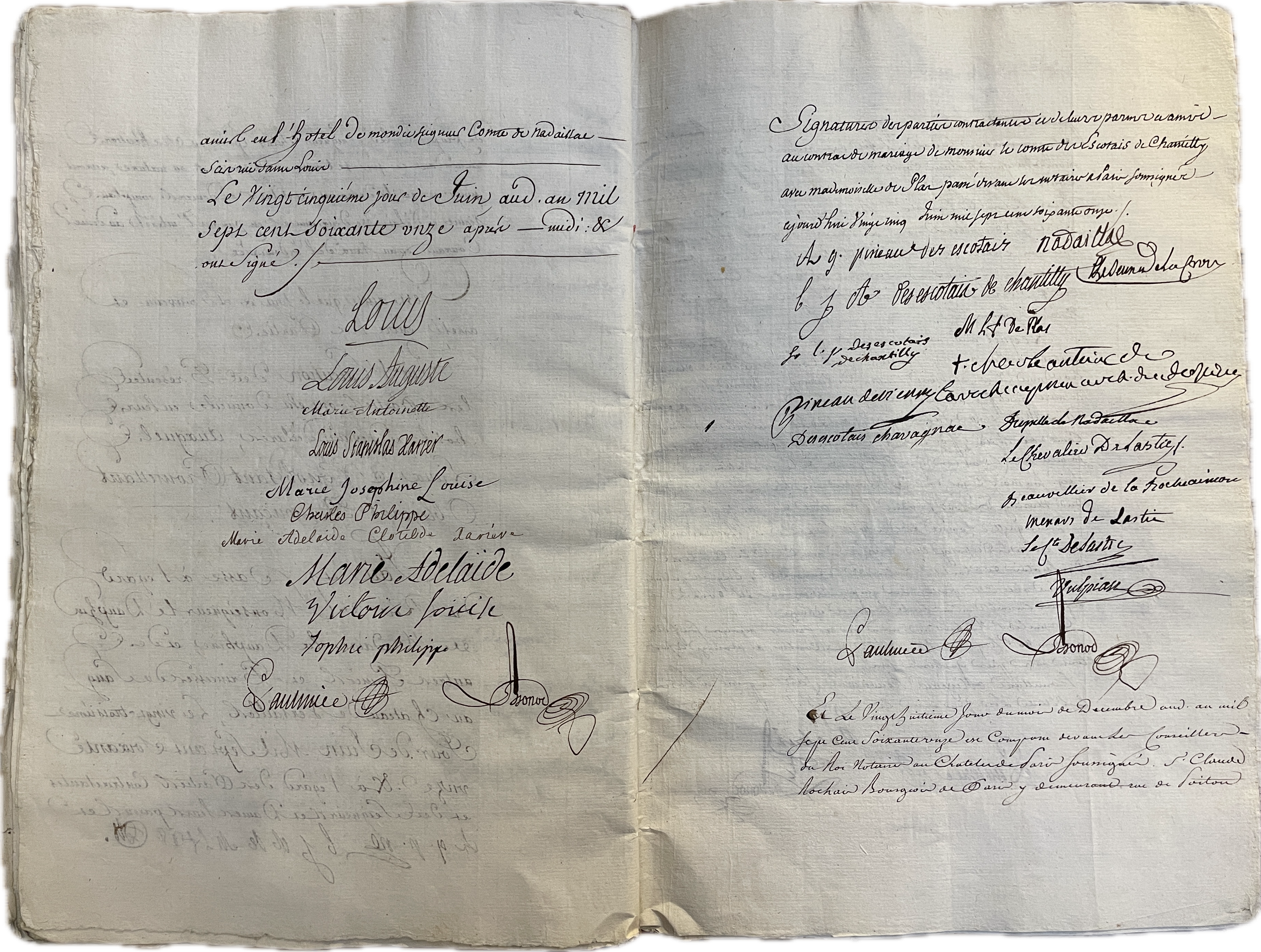
Marriage contract of Louis des Escotais signed by Louis XV and the French royal family

Following the Revolution, he left France in September 1791 with his eldest son. He then took command of one of the divisions of the Armée des Princes, notably during the Siege of Maastricht in 1793.

He later moved to London with his eldest son, where he remained for nearly twenty years, dying there on November 9, 1812, at the age of 66. He was buried in the cemetery of St Pancras Old Church.

== Military career ==
Louis des Escotais began his training at a young age, as was customary for aristocratic sons. In 1760, at the age of 14, he joined the king's first company of musketeers. He continued his training under his uncle, Louis-Joseph des Escotais (Field Marshal of the Chantilly regiment), serving as his aide-de-camp. At just 15, he participated in the Seven Years' War. His bravery was particularly noted during the Battle of Friedberg (August 28–30, 1762), where he was wounded in the arm and his horse was killed under him.

In 1765, at the age of 19, he completed his training and took command of a company in the Esterhazy regiment, and four years later, he was promoted to Mestre de Camps.

His military and diplomatic abilities were noted, and he was appointed as an embassy advisor to the States General of the Provinces of the Union (now the Netherlands) on November 12, 1772. There, he conducted several intelligence activities on behalf of Louis XV.

He then returned to France and on April 18, 1776, received command of the Boulonnois regiment from Louis XVI, and was promoted to colonel, then to Brigadier in 1781.

His loyalty and bravery earned him the honor of being decorated in 1777 with the Royal and Military Order of Saint Louis, a distinction rewarding the most valiant officers.

He ended his career in the French army of the old regime at the rank of field marshal, which he obtained on March 9, 1788.

== Archives ==
- Acts of Catholicity, Series: 6NUM6/231/017. Tours (France): Departmental Archives of Indre-et-Loire.
- Senior Officers of the Ancien Régime in France, Series: 4 YD 3177. Archives of the Historical Service of the French Armies.
- Notarial Practice of Maître Desjardins, Series: 3E 44 242. Departmental Archives of Yvelines(France).
- Notarial Practice LXXXVIII (88) of Paris, Series: MC/ET/LXXXVIII/728. French National Archives.
- File of the Embassy Advisors of the Netherlands, Series: MN 266 QO. Archives of the French Ministry of Foreign Affairs.
