= William Hayes (composer) =

English composer, organist, singer and conductor (1706–1777)

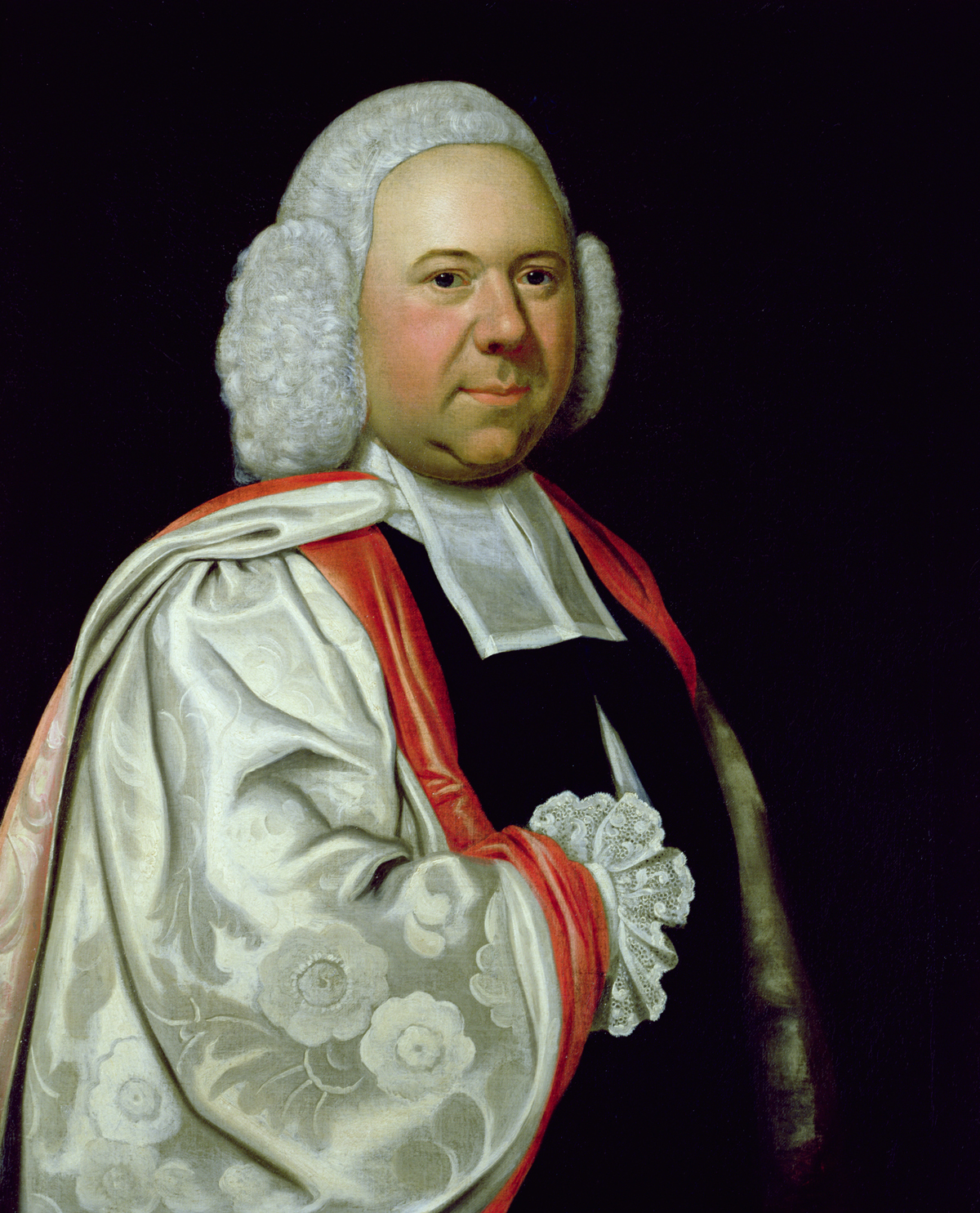
- Hayes, c. 1749, by John Cornish
- Born: 1706; Gloucester, England
- Died: 27 July 1777 (aged 70–71); Oxford, Oxfordshire, England
- Education: Magdalen College, Oxford (B.Mus, D.Mus)
- Occupations: Composer; organist; singer; conductor
- Years active: 1720s–1777
- Era: Baroque
- Employers: St Mary's Church, Shrewsbury; Worcester Cathedral; Magdalen College, Oxford; University Church of St Mary the Virgin
- Organizations: Royal Society of Musicians; Noblemen and Gentlemen's Catch Club
- Style: Classical
- Children: Philip Hayes

William Hayes (1706 – 27 July 1777) was an English composer, organist, singer and conductor.

== Life ==
Hayes was born in Gloucester. He trained at Gloucester Cathedral, where the cathedral account books record his name amongst the choristers from 1717. He spent the early part of his working life as organist of St Mary's Church, Shrewsbury (1729) and Worcester Cathedral (1731). The majority of his career was spent at the University of Oxford, where he was appointed organist of Magdalen College in 1734, and established his credentials with the degrees of B.Mus in 1735 and D.Mus in 1749. (He was painted by John Cornish in his doctoral robes around 1749.) In 1741, he was unanimously elected Heather Professor of Music and organist of the University Church of St Mary the Virgin. He presided over Oxford's concert life for the next 30 years and was instrumental in the building of the Holywell Music Room in 1748, the oldest purpose-built music room in Europe. He was one of the earliest members of the Royal Society of Musicians, and in 1765 was elected a "privileged member" of the Noblemen and Gentlemen's Catch Club. He died in Oxford, around age 70.

== Music style ==
Hayes was an enthusiastic Handelian and one of the most active conductors of his oratorios and other large-scale works outside London. His wide knowledge of Handel left a strong impression on his own music, but by no means dominated it. As a composer, he tended towards genres largely ignored by Handel—English chamber cantatas, organ-accompanied anthems and convivial vocal music—and his vocal works show an English preference for non–da capo aria forms. Hayes also cultivated a self-consciously 'learned' polyphonic style (perhaps inspired by his antiquarian interests) which can be seen in his many canons, full-anthems, and the strict fugal movements of his instrumental works. Nevertheless, several of his late trio sonatas show that he was not deaf to newly-emerging classical styles. Although he published virtually none of his instrumental music, his vocal works were extremely popular, and the printed editions were subscribed to by large numbers of amateur and professional musicians. Substantial works like his ode The Passions, the one-act oratorio The Fall of Jericho, and his Six Cantatas demonstrate that Hayes was one of the finest English composers of the 18th century.

As a writer, his Art of Composing Music includes the first published description of aleatoric composition—music composed by chance—albeit deliberately satirical in intent. In his Remarks he reveals much about his aesthetic outlook: in particular that he valued the music of Handel and Corelli over that of Rameau, Benedetto Marcello and Geminiani. Finally, the Anecdotes offer insights into the organisation of provincial music festivals in the mid-18th century. Hayes bequeathed his important and wide-ranging music library to his son, Philip Hayes; the manuscripts of both father and son eventually passed to the Bodleian Library, Oxford, in 1801.

== Main works ==
=== Sacred works ===
- The Fall of Jericho, oratorio, c. 1740–50
- Sixteen Psalms (London, 1773)
- David, oratorio, completed by Philip Hayes
- Around 20 anthems and service music, in Cathedral Music in Score, edited by Philip Hayes (Oxford, 1795)

=== Secular vocal works ===
- 12 Arietts or Ballads and 2 Cantatas (Oxford, 1735)
- When the Fair Consort, ode (Oxford, 1735)
- Circe, masque (Oxford, 1742)
- Six Cantatas (London, 1748)
- Peleus and Thetis, c. 1749
- The Passions, ode, (text by William Collins), 1750
- Where Shall the Muse, ode, 1751
- Hark! Hark from Every Tongue, ode, 1759
- Ode to the Memory of Mr. Handel, c. 1759
- Daughters of Beauty, ode, 1773
- Catches, Glees and Canons, books i–iv (London, 1757–85)

=== Instrumental works ===
- Six concerti grossi, strings (B♭, D, g, d, D, B♭)
- The Rival Nations, concerto
- Bassoon concerto, lost
- Harpsichord concerto in G, c. 1735–40
- Organ concerto in A
- Organ concerto in D, 1755
- Six trio sonatas (F, B♭, D, F, B♭, e)

== Writings ==
- The Art of Composing Music by a Method Entirely New (London, 1751)
- Remarks on Mr. Avison's Essay on Musical Expression (London, 1753)
- Anecdotes of the Five Music Meetings (Oxford, 1768)

== Discography ==
- O Worship the Lord, in "The Georgian Anthem", Choir of New College, Oxford, 1988 (Meridian, CDE 84151)
- Concertos, Sinfonias and Overtures, performed by Capriccio Basel, 2006 (Capriccio SACD 71135)
- Aria and Chorus from The Passions, Emma Kirkby, Cantillation, Antony Walker, 2006 (ABC Classics 4765255)
- The Passions (An Ode for Music, Oxford 1750). La Cetra Barockorchester Basel. Anthony Rooley, Glossa (1 CD, June 2010)
- William Hayes: Professor of Music. Vocal and Instrumental Music including Ode to Echo, Winter Scene at Ross, Concertos (including Harpsichord Concerto), Trio sonata in E minor. Corelli Orchestra, Evelyn Tubb. www.corelliconcerts.co.uk
- Ceremonial Oxford: Music for the Georgian University by William Hayes (1708–1777), Choir of Keble College, Oxford, Instruments of Time and Truth (CRD 3534)
- William Hayes: The Fall of Jericho Corelli Orchestra, Hannah Davey, James Gilchrist, Peter Harvey, Tewkesbury Abbey Schola Cantorum. www.corelliconcerts.co.uk

== Bibliography ==
- Heighes, Simon. The Lives and Works of William and Philip Hayes, Garland Press (Outstanding Dissertations in Music from British Universities), New York, 1995
- Shaw, Watkins. The Succession of Organists, Oxford, 1991
