= James Bartleman (singer) =

English bass singer

James Bartleman (1769–1821), was an English bass singer who performed at the Concerts of Ancient Music and revived the solo songs of Henry Purcell.

== Life ==
Bartleman was born 19 September 1769. He was educated under Dr. Cooke, of Westminster, and became a chorister in the abbey. He distinguished himself even as a boy singer, and by his gentle, amiable disposition, became a great favourite not only with his master, but also with Sir John Hawkins, whose daughter Laetitia mentions him frequently in her Anecdotes with admiration of his talents and character.

He made his first appearance as a bass singer in 1788 at the Concerts of Ancient Music, and he kept up his connection with that institution, with only one break, until compelled by ill-health to resign. In 1792, he sang the lead in the premiere of Harriet Wainwright's opera Comala. During the seasons 1792–4 he quit the Ancient Concerts for the concerts newly established by Harrison and Knyvett, where he held the post of leading bass. Though he is usually called a bass singer, his voice seems to have had rather the character of a baritone, for a contemporary critic, in the London Magazine for 1820 speaks of its being incomparably more agreeable and effective than a bass, and also compares it to the violoncello. His compass was of unusual extent, from E below the bass stave to G above it. The same critic tells us that his intonation was wonderfully true, and that his richness and equality of tone resulted in part from his peculiarities of pronunciation; as instances of which, the words "die" and "smile" are given as "doy"’ and "smawele".

Bartleman greatly admired Purcell's solos, and, at the 1796 season of the Ancient Concerts, revived nearly all those bass songs which later became the best known specimens of the composer's work, including the Frost Scene from King Arthur and "Let the dreadful engines of eternal will" from Cardenio. John Wall Callcott and William Crotch wrote songs especially for him. He was a beautiful copyist of music, as is shown by a copy of Marenzio's madrigals made by him, which is now in the British Museum. The London Magazine of April 1821 reported that he was too ill to sing, but that hopes were held out of his recovery from the disease to which he had long been subject. However, he died on 15 April, and was buried in the cloisters of Westminster Abbey.
