= John Wall Callcott =

English composer

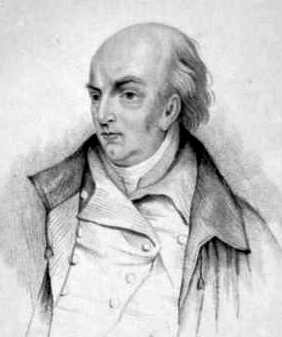
John Wall Callcott. Portrait by Burnet Reading (1815).

John Wall Callcott (20 November 1766 – 15 May 1821) was an English composer.

Callcott was born in Kensington, London. He was a pupil of Haydn, and is celebrated mainly for his glee compositions and catches. In the best known of his catches he ridiculed Sir John Hawkins' History of Music. Although ill-health prevented Callcott from completing his Musical Dictionary, His Musical Grammar (1806) remained in use throughout the 19th century.

His glees number at least 100, of which 8 won prizes. Callcott set lyrics by leading poets of his day, including Thomas Gray, Sir Walter Scott, Thomas Chatterton, Robert Southey and Ossian. They include (selective list):

- O snatch me swift for 5 voices SATBarB
- It was a friar of orders grey for 3 voices SSB
- In the lonely vale of streams for 4 voices SATB
- Ella for 4 voices SATB
- Cara, vale! for 4 voices SSTB
- Father of Heroes (1792) for 5 voices ATTBB
- The Erl-King - a setting of Goethe's Erlkönig translated into English by Matthew Lewis, author of the Gothic novel, The Monk,
- the original setting (as a three part glee) of Drink to me only with thine eyes

A number of his glees specify two soprano or treble (boy soprano) voices, the second of which has a range appropriate to a female mezzo-soprano or contralto (but would have been thought too high for a counter-tenor of this period).

Callcott also composed solo songs and religious music including psalms and sacred canons.

Callcott's daughter Elizabeth married William Horsley who, in 1824, published A collection of Glees Canons and Catches, an edition of his father-in-law's works together with a Memoir of Dr Callcott. His son William Hutchins Callcott became a composer and arranger.

His brother Augustus Wall Callcott was a noted landscape painter.

== Bibliography ==
- David Baptie: Sketches of (the English) Glee Composers, William Reeves: London, 1896
- Rosamund Brunel Gotch (ed.): Mendelssohn and his Friends in Kensington: Letters from Fanny and Sophie Horsley Written 1833-36, Oxford, 1934
