= Johann Bernhard Logier =

German-Irish composer, pianist and music educator (1777–1846)

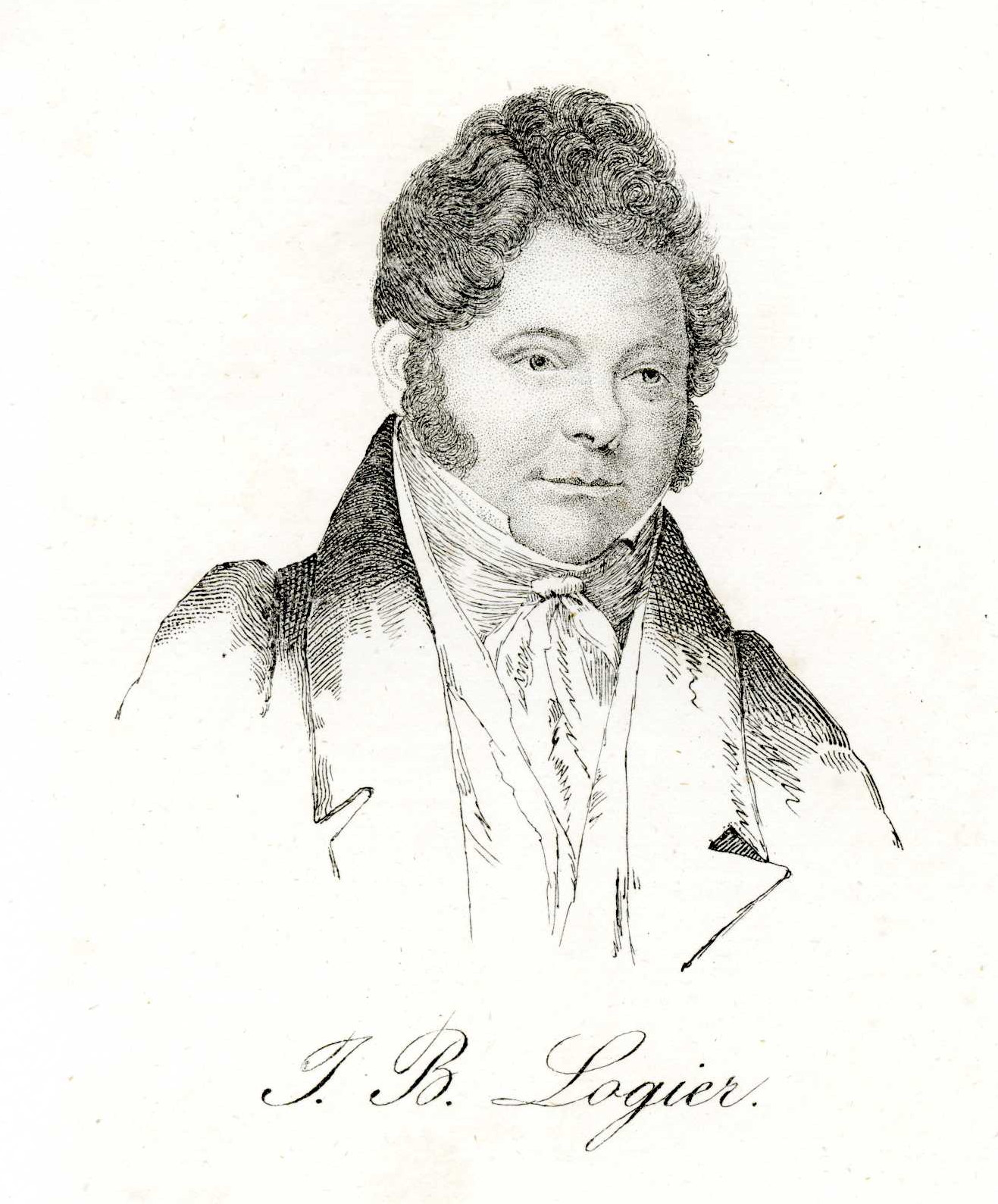
Johann Bernhard Logier (1777–1846), German musician resident in Ireland

Johann Bernhard Logier (9 February 1777 – 27 July 1846) was a German composer, teacher, inventor, and publisher resident in Ireland for much of his life. He invented the chiroplast, a device to help students learn the piano, and developed one of the first systems for attempting to teach music in groups, which faced heavy opposition at the time.

== Biography ==
Logier was born in Kassel and was first taught music by his father, a violinist. He moved to the England in 1791 and joined the Duke of Abercorn's regimental band as a flutist, later becoming director. After moving to Ireland with the regiment in 1802, he was appointed organist in Westport and in 1808 became director of the band of the Kilkenny Militia. In 1809 he became the musical director of the Royal Hibernian Theatre, before opening a successful music shop at 17 Lower Sackville Street (today: O'Connell Street). Except for a three-year stay in Berlin (1822–26), he spent the remainder of his life in Dublin, where he died in 1846.

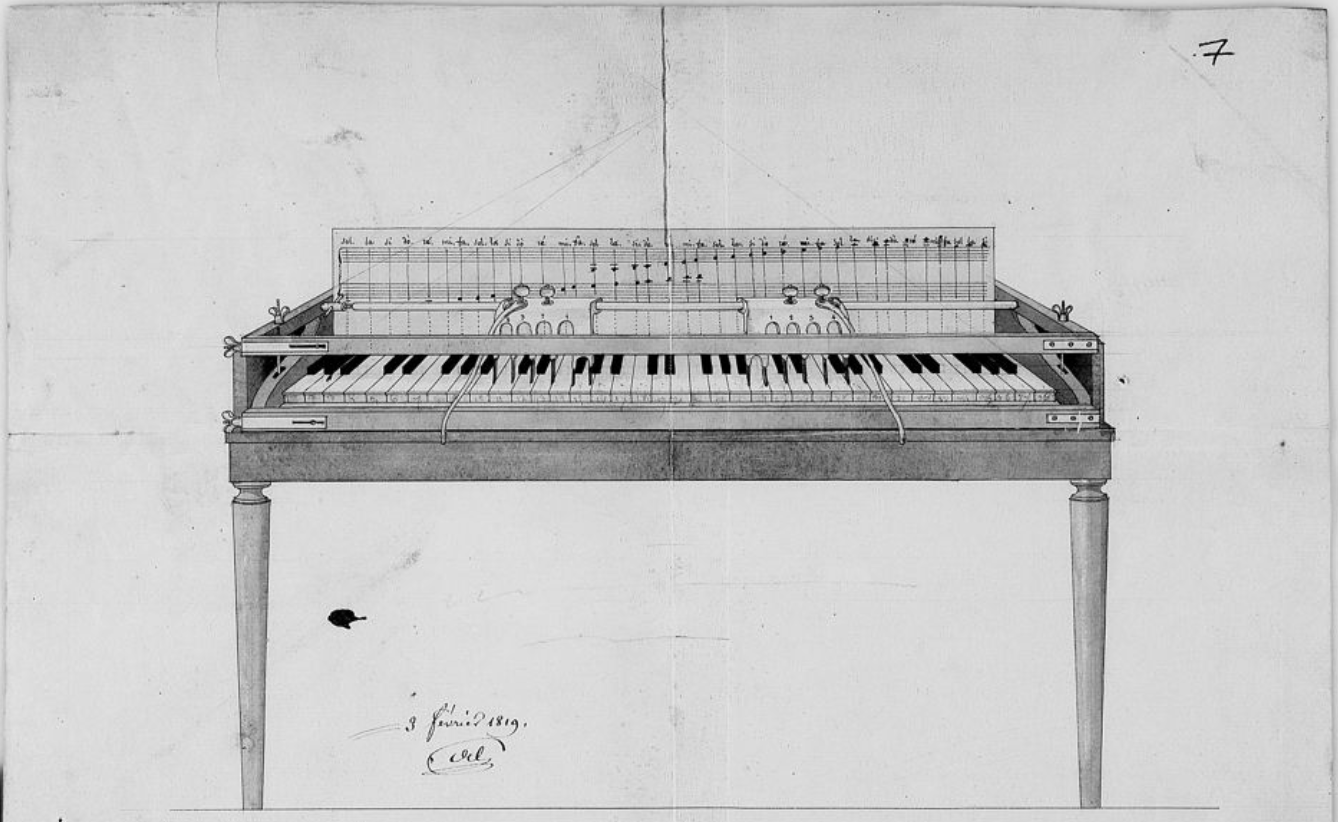
A drawing of a piano with a chiroplast installed on it, from the French patent documents

Logier invented the chiroplast, a sliding frame meant as a pedagogical device to guide the hands and fingers while playing the piano, the intention being to improve and control the position of the hand and wrist. By staging public demonstrations of the mechanism and producing publications and studies to support his theories, the method became very popular within a short period of time. By having the system patented, he could earn license fees from every teacher who used the method. "Chiroplast instruction centres" opened in Dublin, London, Paris, Berlin, Leipzig, and Dresden. The system had ardent followers and critics, with Kalkbrenner and Spohr among the more prominent followers. Others included John Eager. Green's music shop in London had sold 1,600 chiroplasts by 1824.

He also developed his own teaching method, later called the Logierian System of Musical Education, which he published in a series of pamphlets and instruction books beginning with The First Companion to the Royal Patent Chiroplast, or Hand-Director (1815). In this method, several pupils are taught at a time, with technical instruction done together with instruction in principles of harmony. This method of teaching multiple students simultaneously was novel because until the early 19th century, both London and most other European capitals had no central institution to provide musical tuition to a number of students, and because it was heavily opposed by musicians who resisted the idea of losing their pupils to a school. Logier's approach was one of the first attempts at group teaching in music.

In 1827 Logier published his System of the Science of Music, Harmony, and Practical Composition in both English and German editions (System der Musik-Wissenschaft und der praktischen Composition mit Inbegriff dessen, was gewöhnlich unter dem Ausdrucke General-Bass verstanden wird). This textbook of music theory and harmony was widely used and reprinted throughout the nineteenth century. His 1813 Introduction to the Art of Playing on the Royal Kent Bugle was the first text on that instrument.

== Music ==
Logier's achievements as a composer have always been overshadowed by his successful inventions and educational methods, to the extent that many brief biographies don't mention his compositional activity at all. His work-list includes music for piano, flute, harp, bugle, and military bands. He also arranged popular and traditional songs for solo piano. One of Logier's largest compositions is the opera Brian Boroihme [sic!] (1810) on an Irish historical episode, which achieved some success and is an important work in the history of nationalism in Irish opera. He also wrote an ambitious concerto for piano and orchestra, Op. 13 (1816). For a performance of his Battle of Trafalgar (1810) he gathered seven military bands, and The Battle of Vittoria (1813) was performed by 150 instrumentalists.
