= Chiroplast =

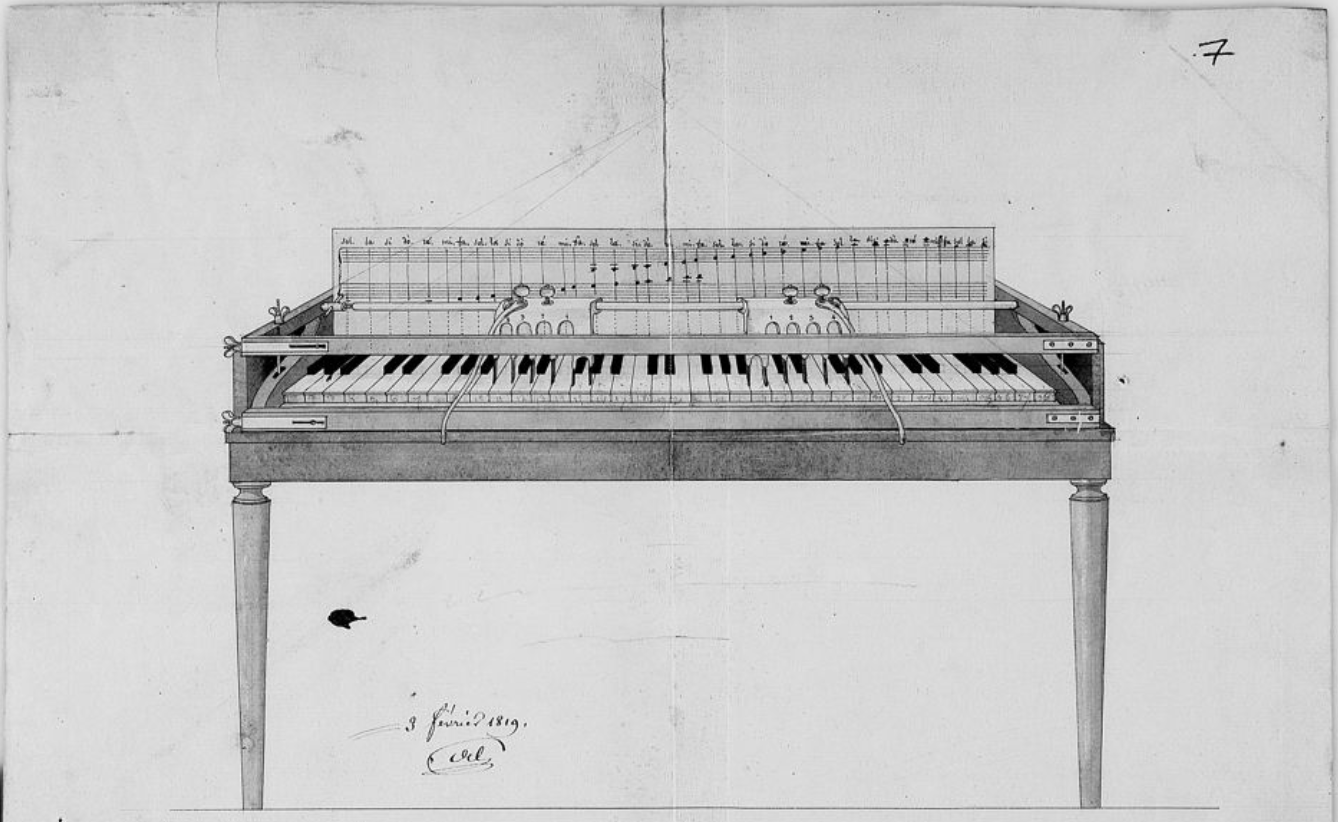
A drawing of a piano with a chiroplast installed on it, from French patent documents

A chiroplast is an instrument to guide the hands and fingers of pupils in playing on the piano, invented and patented by Johann Bernhard Logier in 1814. The instrument was a device that placed the wrist, thumb and fingers of a hand above five consecutive white keys of a keyboard, to overcome the difficulty of retaining their proper position by beginners.

The instrument was a key part of Logier's system of teaching, which was one of the first to call for the teaching of multiple students at once. The use of the chiroplast caused a significant amount of criticism and controversy at the time, at least part of which was due to the heavy opposition to Logier's system by musicians fearing the loss of their students to centralized institutions teaching multiple students at once.

After being invented by Logier in 1814, it quickly became used by many. It was very popular in London in the 1810s and 1820s. In 1822, Logier was invited by the Prussian government to Germany to set up a school instructing teachers on how to teach the use of the device in the country.

== Description ==
The device consisted of a wooden framework screwed into place over the whole length of the keyboard. The user passed their wrists through two parallel wooden bars, which kept the hands at the correct distance from the keys. They then put their fingers into slots in two flat brass frames called "finger-guides" which could freely slide horizontally along a brass rod along the whole length of the keyboard. Each finger-guide had five divisions, through which each finger was placed. Each finger-guide was also attached to a stiff brass wire with a regulating screw, which kept the wrist in the proper position relative to the arm.
