= Samuel Webbe =

English composer (1740–1816)

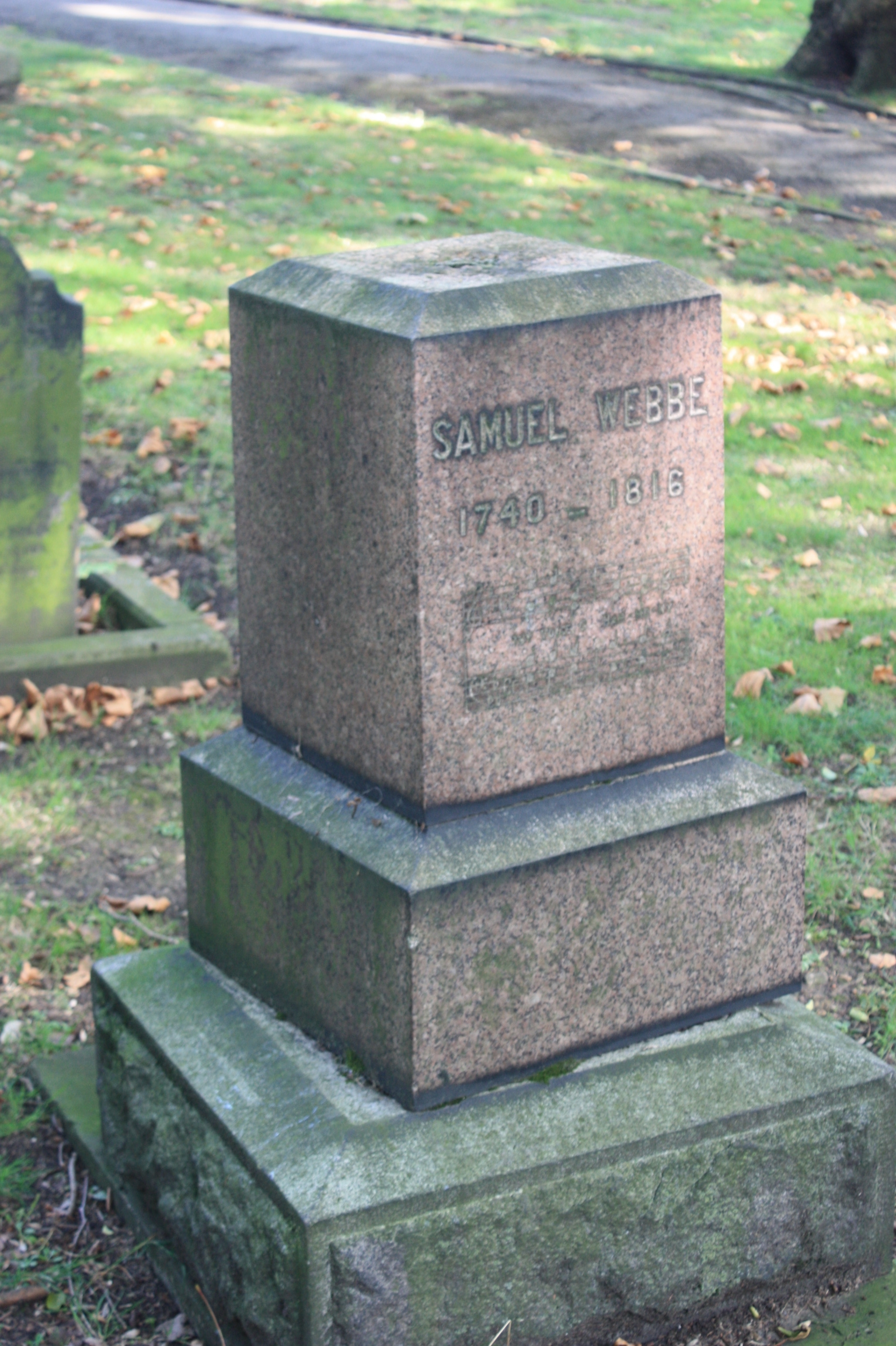
Samuel Webbe's grave, Old St Pancras Churchyard, London

Samuel Webbe (1740 – 25 May 1816) was an English composer.

== Life ==
Born in Menorca in 1740, Webbe was brought up in London. His father died when he was still an infant, and his mother returned to London where she raised Webbe in difficult circumstances. At the age of 11 he was apprenticed to a cabinet maker, and during the first year of his apprenticeship his mother died.

Webbe was an autodidact. He first discovered his aptitude for music when called on to repair the case of a harpsichord. During the course of the repair work he taught himself to play the instrument. Near the end of the job he was overheard playing it. As a result of this incident he turned to the study of music under Carl Barbandt.

A Roman Catholic, in 1776 Webbe succeeded George Paxton as organist of the Sardinian Embassy Chapel, a position which he held until 1795: he was also organist and choirmaster of chapel of the Portuguese Embassy in Lincoln's Inn Fields, the only place in London where the Catholic liturgy could be publicly celebrated.

He died aged 75 at his chambers at Gray’s Inn, London on 25 May 1816. Webbe was buried in Old St Pancras Churchyard in London, east of the small church. The stone originally had the form of a red granite obelisk but only the base now remains.

== Works ==
In 1766, Webbe was given a prize medal by the Catch Club for his "O that I had wings", and in all he obtained twenty-seven medals for as many canons, catches, and glees, including "Discord, dire sister", "Glorious Apollo", "Glory be to the Father", "Swiftly from the mountain's brow", and "To thee all angels". Other glees like "When winds breathe soft", "Thy voice, O Harmony", and "Would you know my Celia's charms" became even better known. Webbe was one of the first organists at St George's Church in Liverpool.

Webbe also published nine books of glees, between the years 1764 and 1798, and some songs. Arguably his glees are his best claim on posterity, though his church music was particularly influential. He wrote one opera, The Speechless Wife, which premiered at Covent Garden on 22 May 1794.

Webbe's An Essay on the Church Plain Chant (1782), was followed by a Collection of Motetts (1792) and A Collection of Masses for Small Choirs (1795), both of which were used in Catholic churches in Great Britain and more widely, through the 19th century. They are historically important in terms of the start of the revival of Roman Catholic liturgical music in England. Some of his motets and hymns are still sung in Catholic and Anglican churches today: the (Anglican) English Hymnal included eight musical settings by Webbe, and Liturgical Hymns Old and New (1999) widely used today in English Catholic churches also includes eight of his works, including popular settings of "O Salutaris Hostia" and "Tantum Ergo" for the Catholic service of Benediction. His hymn tune "Melcombe", often sung to the words by John Keble, New Every Morning is the Love is also regularly heard in Anglican and Catholic churches today. His setting for "Veni Sancte Spiritus" is the one best known to Catholics outside of the plainchant or plain song which was song without music by monks in the monasteries, abbeys and churches of early Latin Christendom. It was not however a form generally known to the Orthodox church of the Byzantium.

== Family ==
Webbe married Anne Plumb in 1763. They had eight children of the marriage, the eldest son Samuel Webbe the younger also being known as a musician.
