= Catch (music) =

Type of musical composition

In music, a catch is a type of round or canon at the unison. That is, it is a musical composition in which two or more voices (usually at least three) repeatedly sing the same melody, beginning at different times. Generally catches have a secular theme, though many collections included devotional rounds and canons.

In early collections the terms "catch" and "round" were interchangeable and, with part-songs and multi-voice canons, were all indexed as "songs". The catch and round differ from the canon in having a cadence on which the song can terminate after a specified number of repeats or when the leader gives a signal. A catch does not necessarily require the lines of lyrics to interact so that a word or phrase is produced from one part in the rests of another. This view became prevalent in the later part of the eighteenth century under the influence of the competitions sponsored by the Noblemen and Gentlemen's Catch Club.

Catches were originally written out at length as one continuous melody, and not in score. The change to printing in score was first made in the early eighteenth century, and this is now the normal method of presentation. In the score for a catch the different voices are usually labelled "1", "2", "3", etc. This indicates that voice "1" sings its part first and continues to part 2. When part 1 has been completed it is sung by voice "2" and so on. A common mistake in performance is for all parts to start together as though the score were to indicate a part song.

== 16th century ==
The earliest secular round is the thirteenth century "Sumer is icumen in". Other early survivals are in manuscripts devoted to topics other than music, and though there may well have been many more over the years, few survived. The first major collection is in the Henry VIII manuscript dated about 1515; but they are really courtly art-songs and too complex to be sung informally.

The current catch repertoire dates from the Lant Collection copied around 1580 and containing 57 catches and rounds. This was followed by the first printed collections edited by Thomas Ravenscroft, which include most of the Lant pieces and most of those in the Melvil collection. Taking all three sources together this amounts to about 145 catches or rounds with a few part-songs. The contents list in all three Ravenscroft publications refer to "the songs in this book". Pammelia has a running page header "Canons in the unison", but the sections are headed "rounds or catches of 3 (&c) voices". Deuteromelia introduces part-songs labelled as "Freemens songs". Melismata divides the contents into City Rounds and Country Rounds as contrasted with part-songs labelled Court varieties, City Conceits and Country pastimes.

The Ravenscroft catches have no identified composers save for two that are known to be by Lassus. There is no evident distinction between rounds and catches and no set terminology for part-songs. Though the catches are generally short, one or two take a whole page to print (four parts of 13 bars), and subject matter is varied, including pastoral, descriptive and devotional items, and none that might be described as bawdy.

== Early 17th century ==
John Hilton's Catch That Catch Can is described as "A choice collection of Catches rounds and canons". Inside there is a table of "catches and rounds in this book", followed by "a table of the Sacred Hymns and Canons"; however, none of the first section is specifically described as catch or round. In the last section the canons are described as such, and the few "hymns" in three parts have no description; in fact unlike the catches and canons they are very much older than the rest of the contents which had been written in the first half of the seventeenth century.

The contributors were generally church musicians such as Hilton himself, Nelham and Holmes, or court composers such as the Lawes brothers, Henry and William, and Simon Ives. There is evidence that the catches were sung by the composers and their friends in off-duty hours, especially the taverns and ale houses around Parliament Square. The subject matter includes more in the way of street cries and conviviality than in the Ravenscroft catches, and 37 (of 138) are devotional hymns and canons, only a few of which are in Latin. "Here dwells a pretty maid" by Cranford, another church musician, is the sort of minority contribution that made some nineteenth commentators consider all catches to be bawdy; it is said that a soldier singing this three-part catch (alone?) was heard by Cromwell and hauled before his colonel.

Shakespeare's play Twelfth Night features some of the more rowdy characters drinking and singing catches late at night, of which one is said to begin "Hold thy peace, thou knave".

== Later 17th century ==
John Playford who published Hilton's collection continued to do so after Hilton's death (1656) with further versions of Catch that Catch Can in 1658 and 1663 with some omissions and replacements. This changed in 1667 when he included a much larger "second book containing dialogues glees, ayres & ballads". The list of catches in the first part continues from 1663 with the usual updates and omissions. The second part is headed simply The Musical Companion and contains part-songs and may be the first use of "glee" in this sense, and certainly seems to have established a general outline of use for some time. Playford, with his son Henry, dominated music publishing until the end of the century. Music meetings had begun during the Commonwealth and Catch singing was much practised by displaced choirmen; and so the Playfords encouraged the formation of more catch clubs to buy and sing their music.

After the Restoration a new generation of composers included Henry Aldrich, John Blow and Michael Wise, who were employed by the church; and Henry Purcell and John Eccles, whose later work was in the newly revived theatres. Examples include Purcell ("A catch upon the viol"), Wise ("A catch upon the midnight cats"); and Eccles ("My man John").

The biggest change in subject matter was politics, sometimes explicitly and at others hidden deep in allegory and allusion, especially in the 1680s. This accounted for the largest number of catches circulated anonymously in MS (to avoid arrest) though some were openly party propaganda. New habits were also covered; smoking (Aldrich) and congested water travel (Isaak), though conviviality (wine, women and song) accounted for an even greater share than before. Purcell was probably the most prolific contributor with 53 catches to his name including two that are bawdy and many more wrongly attributed to him, most of which are bawdy.

== 18th century ==
John Playford retired in 1684, and his place was taken initially by Henry Playford working with Richard Carr, but they were overtaken by new technology. Hitherto there had been little change in music printing since the mid sixteenth century; all of the publications discussed so far have a basic similarity in their printed appearance. Thomas Cross regularised an engraving system, and the commercial advantages were seen by John Walsh from the beginnings of his business in 1695. From there Walsh dominated music publishing through the first half of the 18th century. Further, the new method was cheaper and quicker, so publications diversified and increased in number. Though Walsh preferred the sort of anthology published in the previous century, it gradually became more common to see single-composer collections. Those anthologies that appeared usually also included glees, printed in score as compared with the separate parts which prevailed for example in 1667.

With increasing prosperity more music was printed and, though plates were initially more expensive to engrave, it was their re-use in new anthologies which kept costs down. Even so, catches seem less popular in the early eighteenth century, as other forms of music became more popular. Less significant figures such as Richard Brown and John Church helped to bridge the gap into the new century, but it was Maurice Greene who dominated this period, despite the presence of opera composers such as Handel and Bononcini. Greene became Master of the King's music when Eccles died (1735), and he changed the way in which catch music was presented. Hitherto it had been written in a continuous line, but Greene had it printed in score. Moreover, he published only his own catches, a practice followed by Hayes and others.

William Hayes was representative of a larger group of composers born in the early part of the century, many still employed by the church but increasingly in the theatre or pleasure gardens. This included Arne, Baildon, Boyce, and Nares, and immigrant musicians such as Marella, Lampe, Berg and Festing, who worked entirely outside the church. Subject matter of the catches continued as before but began to reflect theatrical work in the way that Purcell had done.

Various continental composers wrote in a similar vein, but all called their work canons. The most prolific was Michael Haydn, whose work remained unpublished until very recently. He encouraged his neighbours in Salzburg, the Mozarts, to sing and write canons, and several by Wolfgang are extant, including two MS originals in BL. Likewise Michael's brother Joseph wrote some amusing pieces including Crab Canons that can be sung upside down (and thus back to front) at the same time as forwards. Some surprisingly jocular pieces exist from the hand of Ludwig van Beethoven, all of which have been published. Even so, the idea of a group meeting regularly seems not to have taken root as it did in Britain.

== The Catch Club ==
An event which changed matters substantially in England was the formation of the Noblemen and Gentlemen's Catch Club in 1761, and especially its decision to award prizes. Notwithstanding its name, glees featured strongly in its repertoire from the start, as they did for most clubs of the period. Nevertheless, the award of prizes may have altered the balance. In 1762 prizes were awarded for catch, canon, serious glee, and cheerful glee. In 1768 Italian catch was added, and later we find ode, canzonet, and madrigal as well as the more frequent glee and catch.

The first secretary of the Club was Thomas Warren (later Warren-Horne after an inheritance) who published an annual collection of catches and glees from 1762 to 1793, generally known as the Warren Collection. Some are anonymous, which accords with the Club's submission rules, though in most cases Warren has supplied a composer. Gladstone writes (p. 41) that "The worst of the literature set to music was either destroyed or suppressed...Catches were still written but not to objectionable words." Nevertheless, catches had from early times exploited the gaps revealed by rests to reveal hidden meanings from other lines, usually with amusing intent. In the first volume of the Collection is an epitaph by Giardini (p. 29) which exploits the division of syllables "in a count-ry churchyard" in this way, so perhaps members reading the lyrics, and not the music, did not find them objectionable. This seems to have set the tone for a revival of this style of catch since there are many more in this vein.

Similarly, glees had not been especially singled out before this period, and their encouragement eventually led to the formation of clubs explicitly devoted to glees, starting in 1787 with the Glee Club in London and another at Harrow School. On the whole the glees stimulated by the prizes started with a clearly pastoral or abstract content and developed a style which separates them from the earlier part-songs published in catch collections. Catches on the other hand increasingly exploited the gaps revealed by rests which reveal hidden meanings from other lines, to the extent that many began to believe that this is the essence of the catch.

Of the many composers associated with the Catch Club, three stand out. John Wall Callcott submitted his first glee at the age of 18 and the following year, 1784, carried off three of the prizes, and was a frequent prize-winner until their abolition in 1794. He may well have assisted in their abolition by submitting nearly 100 compositions in one year. Singers were hired to try out the compositions before a selection committee, so this became very expensive. Callcott's popular catch "Sir John Hawkins' History of Music" ridiculed Sir John Hawkins' work by comparison with a similarly intended work by Charles Burney.

John Stafford Smith won six prizes from 1773. His output was mostly glees, but his song "To Anacreon in Heaven" was written for the Anacreontic Society and sung by the President after supper; it was later supplied with alternative lyrics and became more widely known as "The Star-Spangled Banner".

Samuel Webbe won 27 prizes and was especially known as a glee composer, becoming Librarian of the Glee Club at its formation and later Secretary of the Catch Club. It is said that he developed a style which is regarded as the essence of the glee. So, though the City Glee Club dates from the 1670s, glees had not been especially encouraged until the Catch Club started to award prizes. Their encouragement eventually led to the formation of further clubs explicitly devoted to glees, starting in 1783 with the Glee Club and another at Harrow School in 1787. On the whole the glees stimulated by the prizes started with a clearly pastoral or abstract content and developed a style which separates them from the earlier part-songs published in catch collections.

=== Other clubs ===
Many other clubs existed under a variety of titles, including the Hibernian Catch Club (Dublin, late C17 and still extant), harmonic societies, Anacreontic societies and so forth. The Canterbury Catch Club (1779 to 1865) has resurfaced as a website with transcripts and recordings of a selection of catches and glees from the archives left in Canterbury. Possibly the last to stagger on into the 20th century was the Round Catch and Canon Club (London 1843–1911).

== Decline and modern revival ==
By the nineteenth century the Noblemen and Gentlemen's Catch Club sang few catches, and its repertoire consisted largely of glees sung by professional members. This was true elsewhere, and choral societies began to absorb the interests of amateur musicians. There was a revival of interest in madrigals so that even the glee as previously known was overshadowed.

Unlike the glee clubs founded in the United States, there seem to be few clubs founded in the 20th century specifically for singing catches. The only known exceptions are The Aldrich Catch Club (London 1954) and the Catch Society of America. [more information needed]

On the other hand, the extension of musical education and easier methods of dissemination, especially the internet, have revealed an active community of people writing canons and rounds. Perhaps a drawback is that many of the older rounds and catches so disseminated have become detached from their origins and composers, though they can be re-connected as time goes by. Nevertheless, comparison of newer materials with 17th and 18th century catches reveal the difficulty, as in epigrams, of choosing a succinct verse well matched to suitably harmonised and polyphonic music. Names quoted include the prolific Donald Sosin (US) and Uitdenbogerd The catch technique has also migrated into other fields: Dashboard Confessional used a catch in the chorus of the song "Hold On" from the album The Swiss Army Romance. The Art of the Ground Round by P. D. Q. Bach uses several catches.

One format which became popular later in the 20th century exploited rests at the ends of lines. Probably the most widely known of these is "Liverpool Street Station", beginning, "The girl that I love has given me the shove \\ She says I am too low for her station". An alternative approach picks out individual syllables from an unrelated text as illustrated by Donald Sosin's catch, "We Took Off Our Ugly Clothes", devoted to the University of Michigan Men's Glee Club, in which the words "University of Michigan Men's Glee Club" can be heard at this link.

In the 21st century, catches gained fringe popularity through the practice of "rounds parties". In New York City, as of 2025, there are two groups hosting monthly gatherings to perform catches, many of which are newly composed. These two groups are led by composers John Hetland; and Lili Tobias and Hannah Cai Sobel, respectively, and they are facilitating a rebirth of the popularity of catch singing.
