= Glee (music) =

English type of choral song

A glee is a type of English part song composed during the Late Baroque, Classical, and early Romantic periods (roughly the Georgian era, taken together). The respectable and artistic character of glees contrasts with the bawdiness of the many catches which continued to be composed and sung well into the early years of the 19th century.

The use of the countertenor voice on the upper part(s) in glees composed for men's voices, and on the Alto part(s) in those for mixed voices, is a particular characteristic of the form (the most famous exponent, known for his elegant ornamentation, was William Knyvett) and serves to distinguish glees from other male voice partsongs, which usually lack countrapuntal writing and have the top part taken by a tenor. This gives them a highest note around a major third below that of men's voice glees. Some care is required in interpreting the intended voicing of glees in contemporary editions, due to the gradual replacement, taking place at this time, of the C clef with the treble clef but often without the required octave transposition being specified.

== Form ==
The term "glee" has been as loosely used as madrigal, from whose rediscovery the impulse for glee composition likely grew (that, at least, was John Callcott's opinion). Glees, although often in simple binary form, can also be extended pieces consisting of a number of short movements contrasted in key and tempo, including so-called word-painting. Their texts can be convivial, fraternal, idyllic, tender, philosophical or even (occasionally) dramatic. Glee composers often turned to near-contemporary poets for their texts on pastoral themes, as well as sources as diverse as Chaucer, Nicholas Breton, Shakespeare and Milton or translations of Classical poets or even Goethe. Some composers also used texts from more Romantic sources such as James Macpherson's Ossianic epics.

The form was very flexible and text-driven and could therefore be a great deal more complex in terms of variety of texture and freedom of expression than that of the post-Mendelssohnian, Romantic part song which largely superseded the glee and was intended to be sung by choirs. Several glee composers wrote pieces they described as madrigals, in imitation of the Renaissance style, the most famous being "Let me careless and unthoughtful lying" by Thomas Linley the Elder. Many glees in fact use madrigalian contrapuntal procedures as part of their tapestry of effects. Other composers successfully juxtaposed sections in the French Overture style and style galant with Affetuoso 3/4 movements and sections of robust Handelian fugal writing as well as short sections for solo or duetting voices. A very few glees have basso continuo or other instrumental accompaniment.

A notable example of the simpler sort of glee is Glorious Apollo, by Samuel Webbe Sr., written in 1787 as a theme song for the newly founded London Glee Club, it is a vigorous piece for 3 voices (ATB). Webbe's glee took root with the Harvard Glee Club, the oldest such group in America, which still sings this song. Webbe wrote the text as well as the music, and in it he faithfully traced the London Glee Club's history; for the first couple of years, the meetings circulated among members' homes. This is reflected in the second line, which notes that the club was "wand'ring to find a temple for his praise." It finally found its "temple" when the club's meetings moved to the Newcastle Coffee House. Webbe's references to the gods of the Greek pantheon were part and parcel of the Georgian gentlemen's singing clubs' identification with the learning and leisure activities of the classical world. Webbe structured the poem so that the first two couplets of each verse were sung by solo voices, with all the members joining in at the refrain, "Thus then combining...".

Glorious Apollo
Glorious Apollo from on high beheld us,
Wand'ring to find a temple for his praise.
Sent Polyhymnia hither to shield us,
While we ourselves such a structure might raise.
Thus then combining, hands and hearts joining,
Sing we in harmony Apollo's praise.

Here ev'ry gen'rous sentiment awaking,
Music inspiring unity and joy.
Each social pleasure giving and partaking,
Glee and good humour our hours employ.
Thus then combining, hands and hearts joining,
Long may continue our unity and joy.

== History ==
The term glee comes from gleo, an Old English word referring both to the more common senses of "glee" and to the performance of music. A related term is gleeman, meaning a wandering musician or poet.

The first song to be described as a glee was Turn, Amaryllis, to thy Swain by Thomas Brewer and a few so-called glees were produced during the remainder of the 17th century but the heyday of the glee was in the years between 1750 and 1850. The form began to grow in importance with the establishment in the early 18th century of gentlemen's singing, or vocal music clubs in London from around 1726 when the Academy of Vocal Music (renamed the Academy of Ancient Music in 1731) was established. These clubs comprised select groups of enthusiasts whose members and guests included well-known musicians, in particular organists and professional singing men from major churches in addition to the amateur gentlemen. Much of the music was for men's voices, and any soprano parts were usually sung by a small group of boys (church choristers). Ladies were rarely present except as listeners. Glees were scored for from three to eight voices and the more elaborate of them are ideally intended to be sung a cappella, one to a part, by professional choral or solo singers.

The first of the great Georgian clubs specifically to embrace the glee was the Noblemen and Gentlemen's Catch Club of London, founded in 1761. Societies to sing, listen to and judge glees whilst dining and drinking became popular in the 18th century and remained so well into the 19th century. Glee clubs were at their most active during the second half of the 18th century, encouraging the production of new glees by awarding prizes to their composers. For example, in 1763 the Catch Club was offering four prizes annually—two for glees (one serious, one cheerful), one for a catch and one for a canon. If Warren's Collection is typical, the catches were usually smutty and the canons religious. Participation by Italian musicians resident in London seem to have been welcomed. Other clubs included the Hibernian Catch Club (Dublin), the Gentlemen's Glee Club (Manchester) and the Apollo Glee Club (Liverpool). Glees such as William Crotch's 'Mona on Snowdon calls' were sometimes introduced into stage productions.

As the 19th century progressed, musical tastes changed along with social structures, and the glee as a musical form began to be replaced by the romantic part song, aimed at larger choirs. By the mid-20th century, the glee was seldom performed. Since then, however, professional singing groups have performed and recorded glees with some success.

== Glee clubs ==
From around 1850, as larger choral societies supplanted the earlier clubs, the term "glee club" was increasingly used in the U.S.A. to describe collegiate ensembles performing 'glees' and other light music in informal circumstances. As these glee clubs began more to resemble standard choral groups during the 20th century, the tradition of singing glees in a social context faded.

== Notable glee composers ==
- Thomas Arne
- Samuel Arnold
- Luffman Atterbury
- Thomas Attwood
- Jonathan Battishill
- William Beale
- Thomas Brewer
- John Callcott
- Benjamin Cooke
- William Crotch
- John Danby
- John Goss
- William Hayes
- Joseph Haydn
- William Horsley
- George William Martin
- Lord Mornington
- James Nares
- William Paxton
- John Sale
- Reginald Spofforth
- John Stafford Smith
- R. J. S. Stevens
- John Andrew Stevenson
- Stephen Storace
- T. A. Walmisley
- Samuel Webbe Sr.

== See also ==
- The Madrigal Society
- Catch (music)
- Choir

== Further reading (and musical sources) ==
- https://www.academia.edu/24525258/James_Hobson_PhD_Thesis_MUSICAL_ANTIQUARIANISM_AND_THE_MADRIGAL_REVIVAL_IN_ENGLAND_1726_1851_University_of_Bristol_2015
- Brian Robins: Catch and Glee Culture in eighteenth-century England. Publ. Boydell and Brewer 2006, ISBN 978 1 84383 212 6
- Hibernian Catch club: https://www.musicologyireland.com/jsmi/index.php/journal/article/view/169/172
- Warren's Collection at IMSLP: https://imslp.org/wiki/A_Collection_of_Catches%2C_Canons_and_Glees_(Warren%2C_Thomas)
- Samuel Webbe Snr.'s A Selection of Glees, Duets, Canzonets, etc. (3 Vols) at IMSLP https://imslp.org/wiki/A_Selection_of_Glees%2C_Duets%2C_Canzonets%2C_etc._(Webbe%2C_Samuel)
- Glees by various composers available for free download at cpdl: http://www.cpdl.org/wiki/index.php/Category:Glees
- Glees available from publisher notAmos, some with free download: https://www.notamos.co.uk/
- Glees, together with partsongs, available from DovetonMusic: http://dovetonmusic.com/Cat_Glees_&_Partsongs.html
- The Scholars' Book of Glees, ed. David Johnson. Publ. OUP 1985, ISBN 0 19 343659 0
- The English Glee, Ed. Percy M. Young. Publ. OUP 1990, ISBN 0 19 343753 8
- Ten Georgian Glees for four voices, ed. David Johnson. Publ. OUP 1981, ISBN 0 19 343658 2
