= Sticker =

Type of label with adhesive on one side

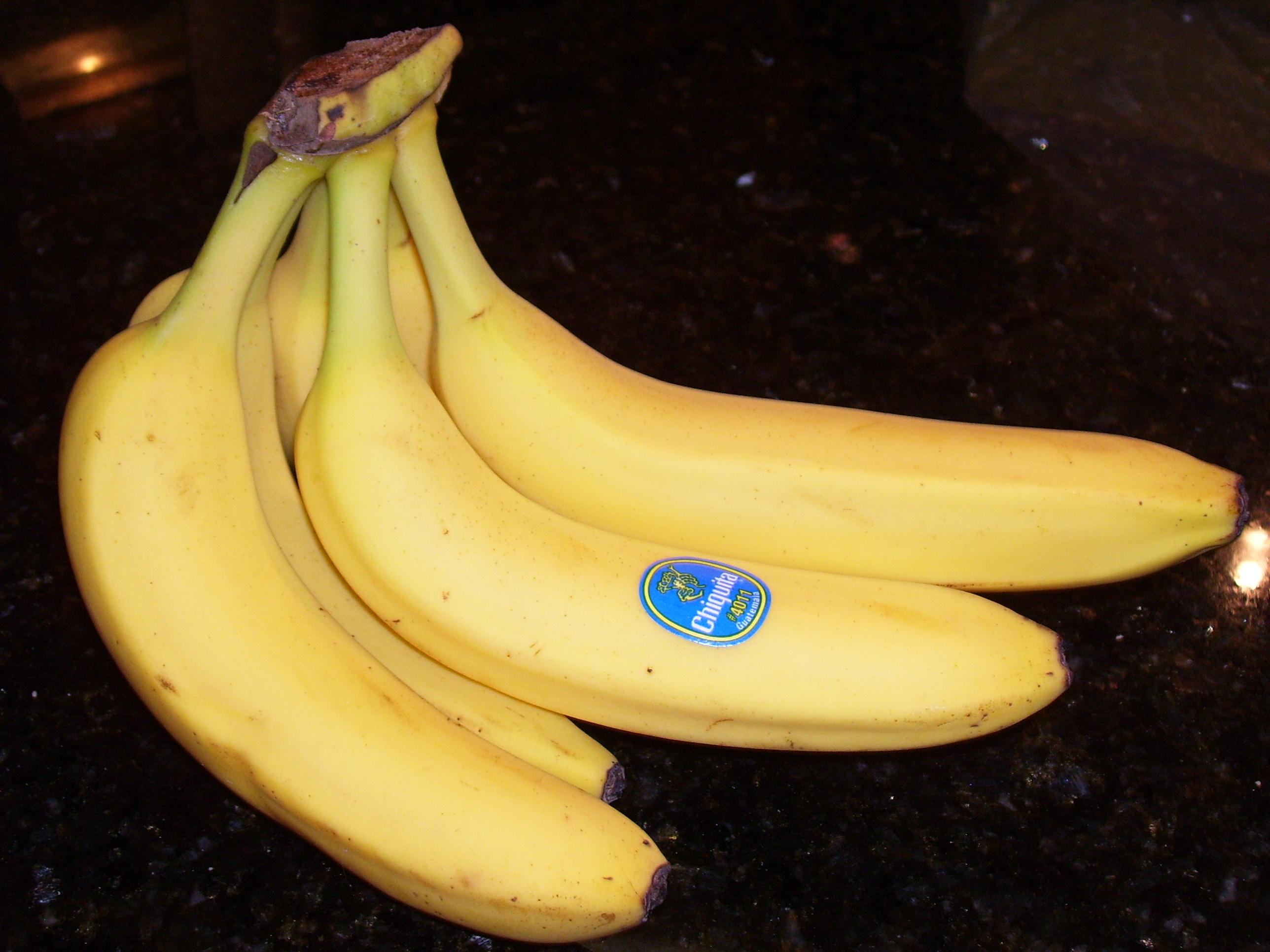
Brand name sticker used to label fruit

A sticker is a type of label: plastic, vinyl, or other material with temporary or permanent pressure sensitive adhesive on one side. It can be used for decoration or for functional purposes, depending on the situation.

Stickers can come in many different shapes and sizes and also vary widely in color and design. They are often stuck to items such as lunchboxes, paper, lockers, notebooks, walls, cars, windows and used as name tags.

== History ==
Notices, advertisements, and posted bills applied to surfaces with tacks or paste have been widespread, although sometimes strictly regulated. An early example is the Peukestas order, a papyrus notice posted in Egypt around 331 BCE.

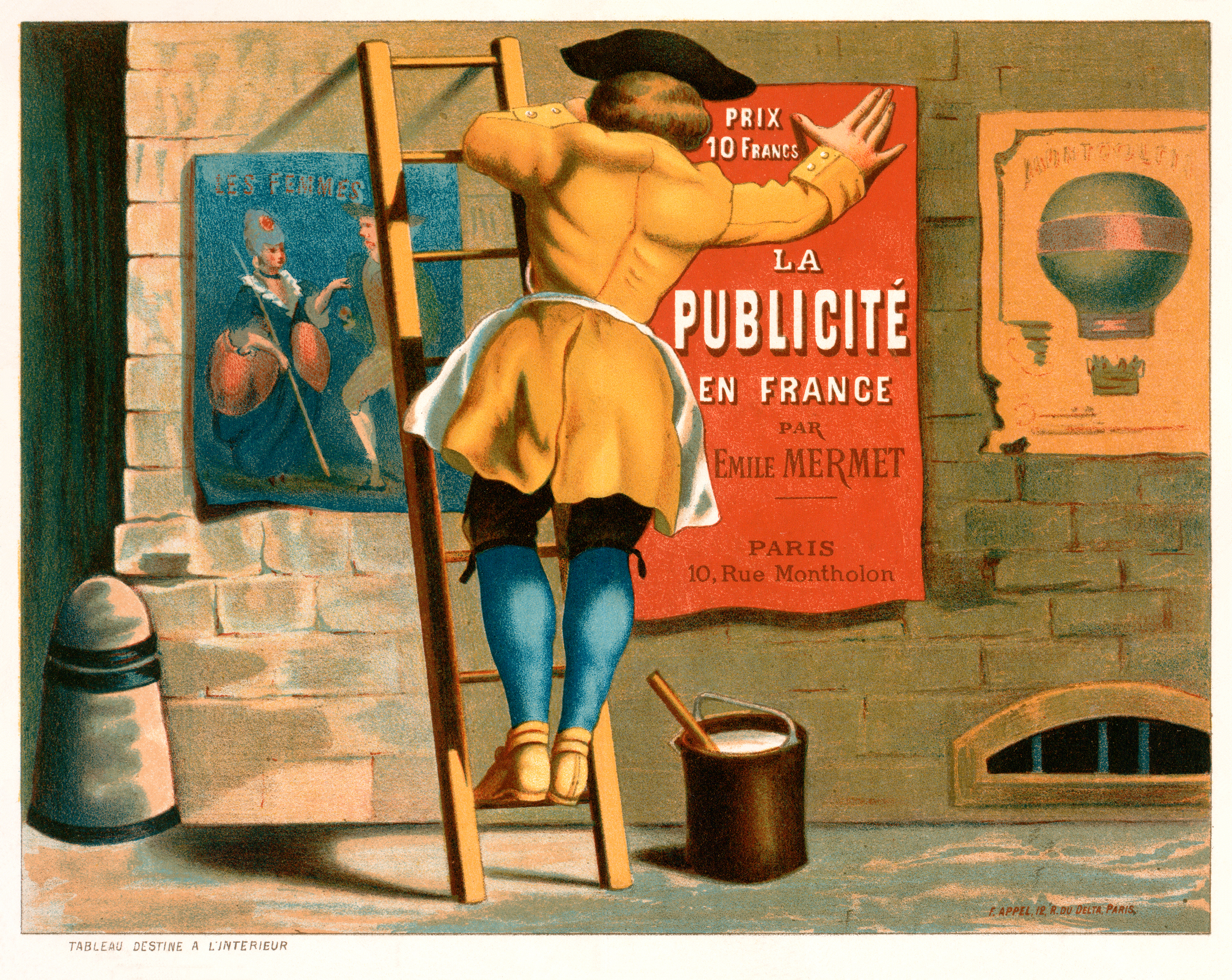
Bill-Sticker posting an advertisement

In the 1750s Simon François Ravenet developed the decalcomania process by which engravings and prints via a transfer paper are affixed to pottery, wood, metal or glass.

The precursors to adhesive stickers included paper images (bilderbogen) manually cut and pasted. Two important advances were gummed adhesive paper by Rowland Hill in 1839, and pressure-sensitive adhesives in 1845.

=== User-moistened stickers ===
The adhesive postage stamp appeared in 1840, pharmacy bottle labels in 1850, and other gummed and cut paper labels by the 1860s, which needed to be moistened with water to activate the adhesive before being affixed. Another early application was book plates and library tags.

Poster stamps were issued for events such as the 1851 London Great Exhibition, 1896 Budapest National Millennium Exhibition, Brussels International Exposition (1897), 1900 Paris Exposition, 1901 Pan-American Exposition, and 1904 Summer Olympics.

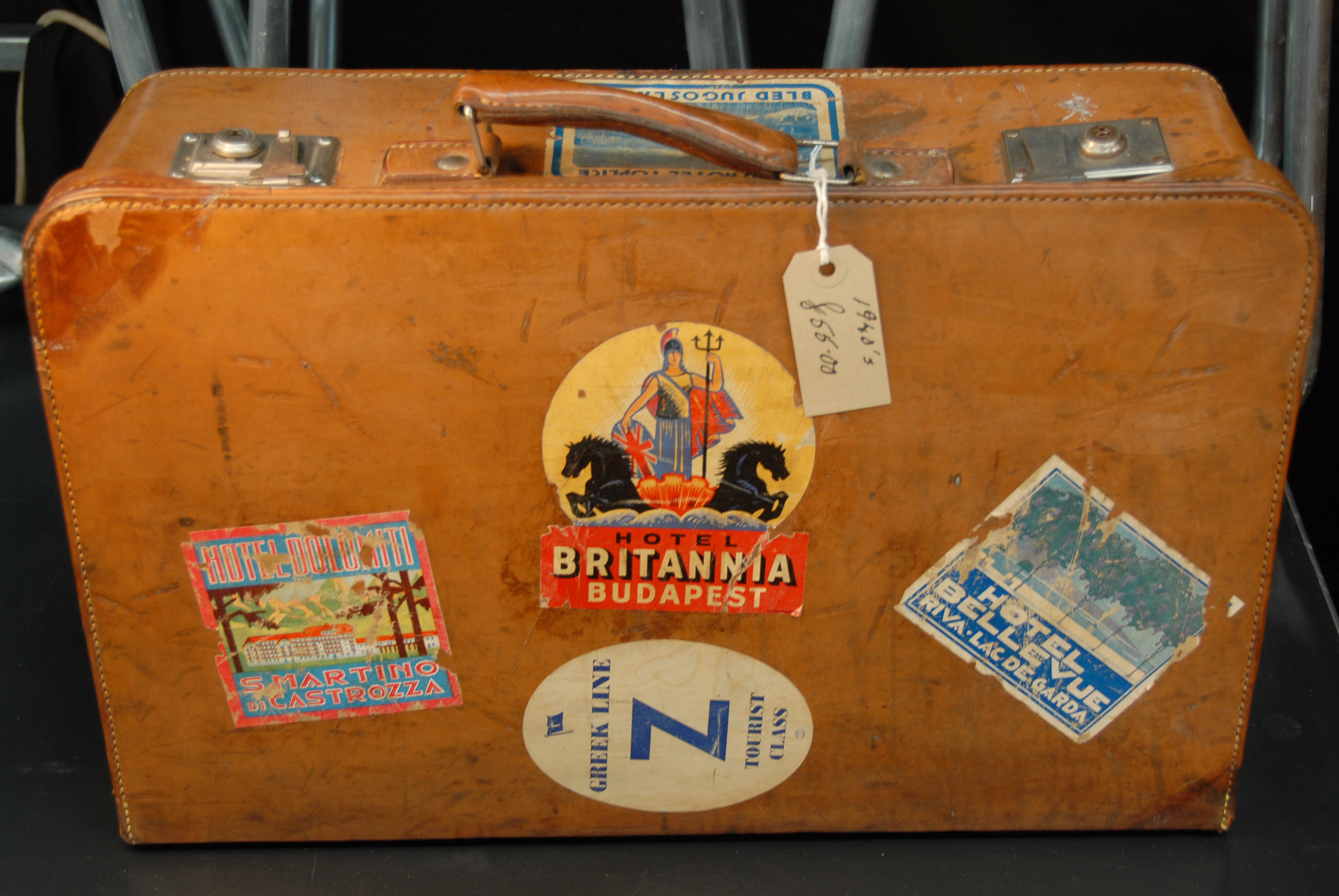
Suitcase with luggage labels

Steamer trunk luggage labels which appeared in the 1870s represented an early status symbol.

In some areas of the U.S. voters used stickers to enter pre-printed candidate names onto election ballots.

In 1891 Trading stamp store loyalty programs began.

By 1896 the Return address pre-printed gummed label was being offered by printers.

In 1896 labor union stickers urged the boycott of a Chicago bicycle maker.

Around 1900 the Dennison Manufacturing Company offered gummed seals in gold, silver, red, green and blue, soon followed by gold and silver stars.

By 1902 stickers began to proliferate, including dedicated businesses such as the St. Louis Sticker Co.

In 1904 Christmas seals were first issued in Denmark.

Example early sticker campaigns in U.S. include Red Sticker Union Made campaign, American Red Cross, and European Child Relief Fund.

Starting in 1910 the Great Northern Railway issued poster stamps as part of their "See America First" travel advertising.

In 1910 user-supplied photograph stickers became available.

Sometime after 1912 a Cracker Jack included prize may have been a temporary tattoo sticker, also later offered in breakfast cereal and bubble gum packages.

Around 1914 the Industrial Workers of the World advocated their causes via stickerettes.

In 1914 the Famous Stars Series of portrait stamps featured silent film stars.

Fruit origin stickers began in 1917, then later by Fyffes and widespread with 1990 PLU codes.

Before 1918 in the U.S. stickers were in use as merchandise price tags.

In 1919 a business in Buffalo, New York, applied stickers on receipts with the word "thanks" and a smiling face.

Automobile window decals, such as National Park emblems, became popular in the 1920s.

Whitman Publishing in 1940 sold a Sticker Fun Activity Set. Merrill Publishing Co. of Chicago issued a Stick-er Pictures book in 1941.

In 1967 Topps began the Wacky Packages initial series of collectible moisten and stick cards.

=== Self-adhesive stickers ===
R. Stanton Avery is credited with creating the first self-adhesive sticker in 1935, with commercial sale in 1940 under the name "Kum Kleen Price Stickers", under the former "Avery Adhesives" company in Los Angeles (currently Avery Products Corporation), where its original use was for labeling on various goods and products.

Example sticker types include:

- 1942 war time gas rationing allocation
- 1940s bumper stickers used to advertise travel attractions
- 1952 Smarty-Pants novelty adhesive cloth patches from Jerry Scanlan, Inc.
- 1958 Automobile Information Disclosure Act prescribed a Monroney sticker be affixed to the window of every new car sold in the U.S.
- 1959 C-Line Products "Hello, my name is ..." name tag
- 1963 Meiji Atomu character sticker sheet
- 1968 Wildlife Preservation Society of Queensland "Save the Reef" bumper sticker
- c. 1971 Robert Crumb Keep on Truckin' sticker
- 1973 Topps resumes the Wacky Packages series as peel-and-stick
- 1976 Hello Kitty character stickers
- 1977 Creative Teaching Press issues scratch 'n sniff stickers
- 1977 the white oval International vehicle registration code on rear of vehicle could be represented as a sticker

Denmark VRI

- 1988 Janet Boudreau's rippling flag “I Voted” sticker offered at U.S. election polling locations
- 1989 Andre the Giant Has a Posse street sticker art
- 1995 Purikura photo booth dispenses selfie photo stickers

Other variants include jelly, fuzzy, metallic, puffy, scaly, prismatic, 3D and eco-friendly.

== Use ==
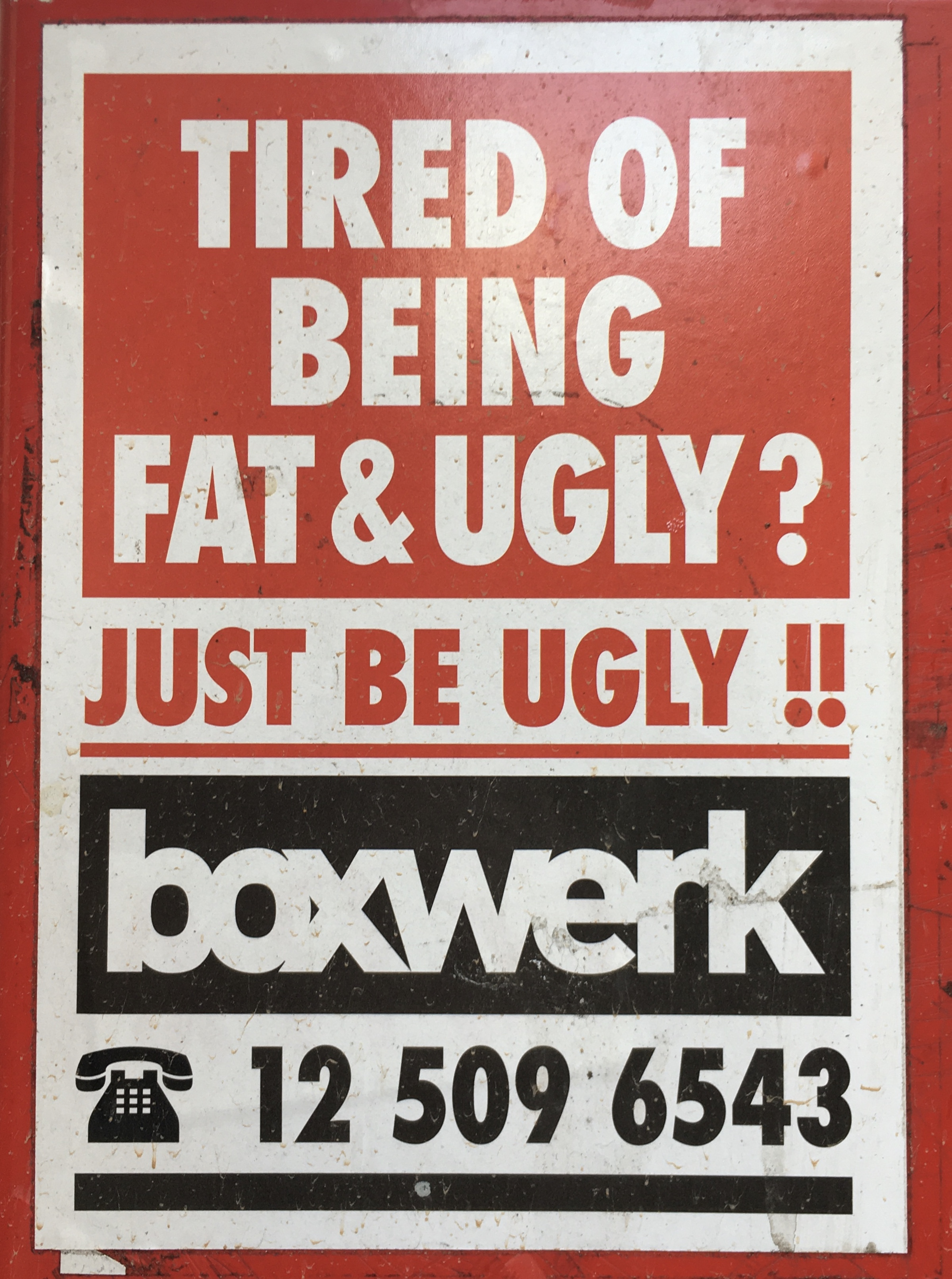
Ad sticker for a boxing studio in Germany, in the style of guerilla marketing

Stickers are widely used when an object requires identification with a word or idea. Brand stickers may be attached to products to label these products as coming from a certain company. They may also be used to describe characteristics of the products that would not be obvious from simple examination, or to clarify either a printing error or change in the product of some kind, such as the country of origination, shift in a product's ingredients, a shelf life date, or copyright notice, without having to scrap pre-existing packaging for such a small change. A label dispenser is often used as a convenient way to separate the sticky label from its liner or backing tape.

Stickers placed on automobile bumpers, magnetic and permanent, called bumper stickers, are often used by individuals as a way of demonstrating support for political or ideological causes. Identification of vehicle registration and last service details are two examples of stickers on the inside of most car windscreens. The term "window sticker" is generally used for vinyl labels which are stuck to the inside of a vehicle's window, as opposed to water-resistant stickers that are stuck to the outside of a vehicle but can be affixed to anything.

Stickers are also used for embellishing scrapbooking pages. Kinds of stickers sold for this purpose include acrylic, 3D, cardstock, epoxy, fabric, flocked, sparkly, paper, puffy, and vellum. While in the earlier days of scrapbooking stickers were sold mostly on 2"x6" sheets, now 6"x12" and even 12"x12" size sheets are very common.

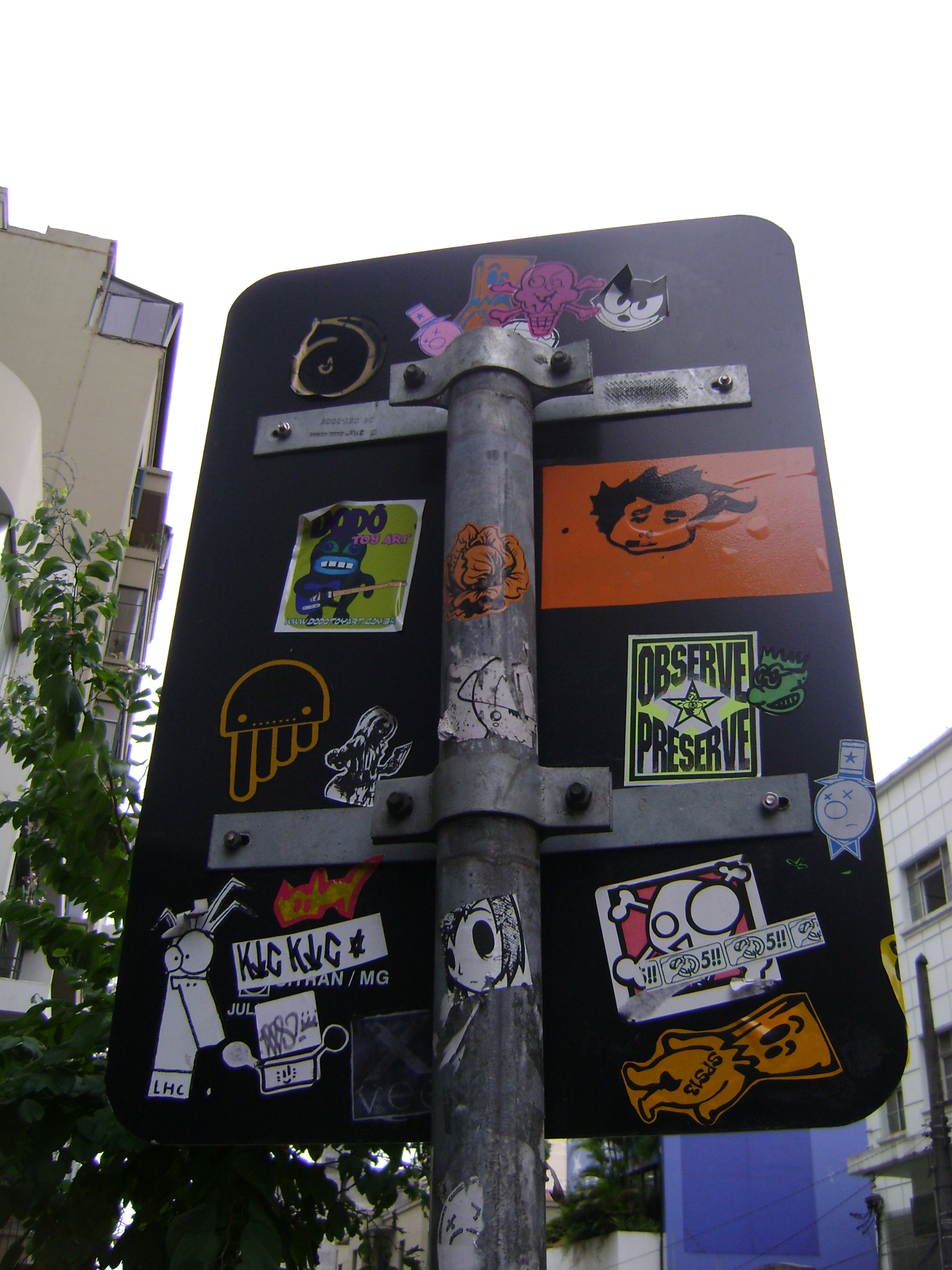
Sticker vandalism in São Paulo, Brazil

They are frequently distributed as part of promotional, and political campaigns; for example, in many voting districts in the U.S., stickers indicating an individual has voted are given to each voter as they leave the polling place, largely as a reminder to others to vote. Observers may clap hands, honk a horn or otherwise applaud a good sticker.

In the 16th century French aristocracy wore stickers on their face to hide blemishes.

Temporary stickers are used today to indicate whether someone is free of certain health symptoms, been vaccinated, or otherwise cleared some security protocol.

Stickers are also used as a form of guerilla marketing, as well as serving as a ubiquitous form of visual and physical vandalism.

Stickers are also printed for use as temporary tattoos.

=== Discount stickers ===
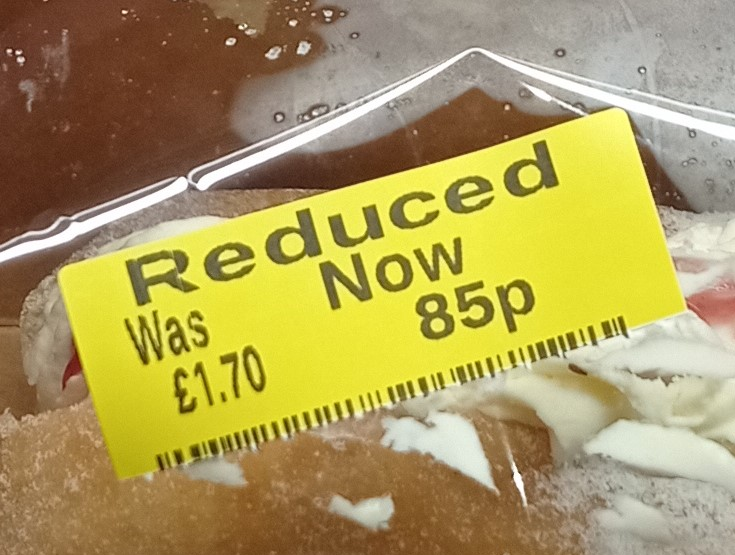
Yellow discount sticker in a British supermarket

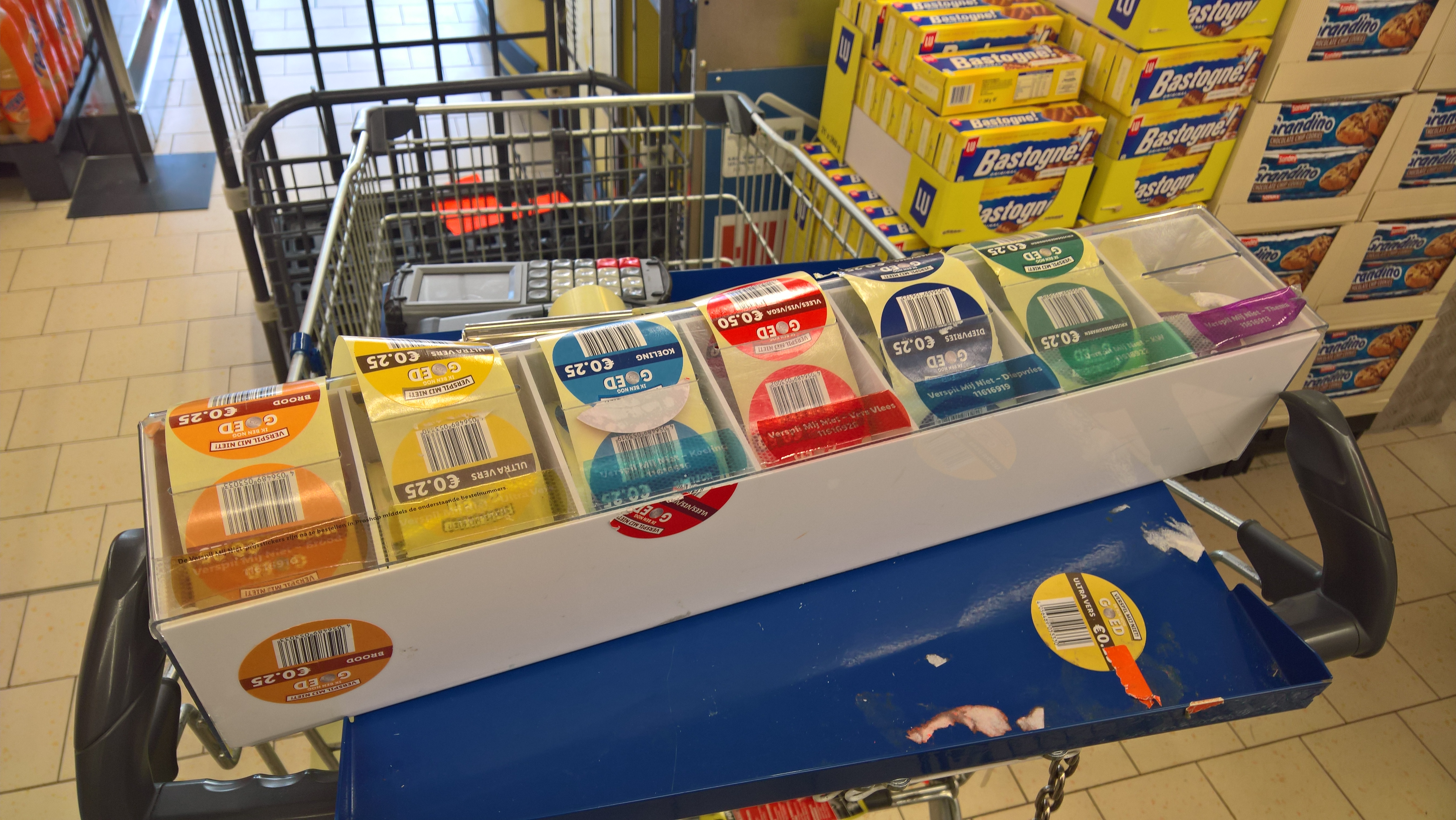
Colour-coding is sometimes used for discount stickers.

Discount stickers are a price markdown that are used to alert shoppers to goods which have been reduced in price, such as food approaching its sell-by date or inventory in discount clothing or outlet stores. Some stores, especially discount clothing stores, have been accused of using discount stickers to create the impression of price markdowns when there is none.

In certain contexts, specific types of stickers have had additional meaning. For example, yellow stickers are used for this purpose by several British supermarket chains, including Asda, Sainsbury's, and Tesco. Post Brexit cost of living increases in the UK, have highlighted the importance of "yellow sticker shopping" as a way to deal with real price increases.

== Collecting ==
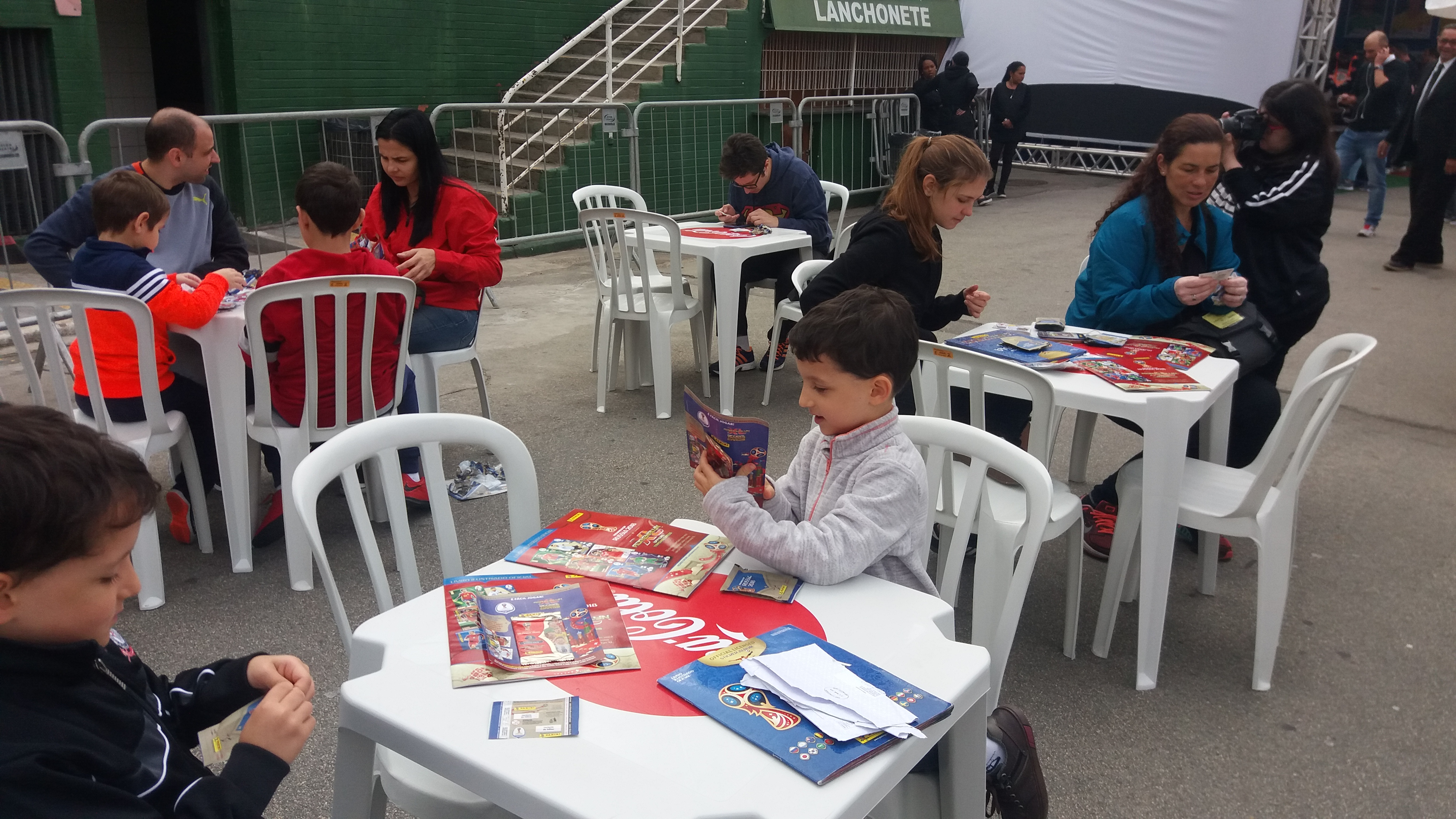
Sticker trade in Brazil for Panini’s 2018 World Cup sticker album

At their simplest stickers can be beginner-friendly collectables, serving as a gateway to the collecting hobby.

Forming a partnership with FIFA in 1970, Panini first produced a World Cup sticker album for the 1970 World Cup. Initiating a craze for collecting and trading stickers, since then, collecting and trading stickers has become part of the World Cup experience, especially for the younger generation. UK newspaper The Guardian states, "the tradition of swapping duplicate [World Cup] stickers was a playground fixture during the 1970s and 1980s."

== See also ==
- Decal
- Pressure-sensitive tape
- Release liner
- Sticker album
- Sticker (Internet) – emoticon-like pictures
- Water slide decal
- Tattoo
