= Decal (disambiguation) =

Decal may refer to:

- Decal, a sticker
  - Ceramic decal
  - Guitar decal
  - Water slide decal
- Decalitre (decaL), a unit of volume in the metric system
- DeCal (Democratic Education at Cal), a student group at the University of California at Berkeley
- Decal texture, a texture/image overlaid on top of other textures in computer graphics
- Decal (software), plugin architecture for the Asheron's Call computer game
- Lick My Decals Off, Baby, the Captain Beefheart music album
- DECaLS, the Dark Energy Camera Legacy Survey
- Decal (company), an American film distribution company
