= Supply chain optimization =

Methodology aiming to ensure the optimal operation of a supply chain

Supply-chain optimization (SCO) aims to ensure the optimal operation of a manufacturing and distribution supply chain. This includes the optimal placement of inventory within the supply chain, minimizing operating costs including manufacturing costs, transportation costs, and distribution costs. Optimization often involves the application of mathematical modelling techniques using computer software. It is often considered to be part of supply chain engineering, although the latter is mainly focused on mathematical modelling approaches, whereas supply chain optimization can also be undertaken using qualitative, management based approaches.

== Applications ==
Typically, supply-chain managers aim to maximize the profitable operation of their manufacturing and distribution supply chain. This could include measures like maximizing gross margin return on inventory invested (GMROII) (balancing the cost of inventory at all points in the supply chain with availability to the customer), minimizing total operating expenses (transportation, inventory and manufacturing), or maximizing gross profit of products distributed through the supply chain. Supply-chain optimization addresses the general supply-chain problem of delivering products to customers at the lowest total cost and highest profit, trading off the costs of inventory, transportation, distributing and manufacturing. In addition, optimizing storage and transportation costs by means of product / package size is one of the easiest and most cost effective initial implementations available to save money in product distribution.

Supply-chain optimization has applications in all industries manufacturing and/or distributing goods, including retail, industrial products, and consumer packaged goods (CPG).

== Approaches and solutions ==
The classic supply-chain approach has been to try to forecast future inventory demand as accurately as possible, by applying statistical trending and "best fit" techniques based on historic demand and predicted future events. The advantage of this approach is that it can be applied to data aggregated at a fairly high level (e.g. category of merchandise, weekly, by group of customers), requiring modest database sizes and small amounts of manipulation. Unpredictability in demand is then managed by setting safety stock levels, so that for example a distributor might hold two weeks of supply of an article with steady demand but twice that amount for an article where the demand is more erratic. Universally accepted statistical methods such as Standard Deviation and Mean Absolute Deviation are often used for calculating safety stock levels.

Then, using this forecast demand, a supply-chain manufacturing Production Planning and distribution plan is created to manufacture and distribute products to meet this forecast demand at lowest cost (or highest profitability). This plan typically addresses the following business concerns: - How much of each product should be manufactured each day? - How much of each product should be made at each manufacturing plant? - Which manufacturing plants should re-stock which warehouses with which products? - What transportation modes should be used for warehouse replenishment and customer deliveries?

The technical ability to record and manipulate larger databases more quickly has now enabled a new breed of supply-chain-optimization solutions to emerge, which are capable of forecasting at a much more granular level (for example, per article per customer per day). Some vendors are applying "best fit" models to this data, to which safety stock rules are applied, while other vendors have started to apply stochastic techniques to the optimization problem. They calculate the most desirable inventory level per article for each individual store for their retail customers, trading off cost of inventory against expectation of sale. The resulting optimized inventory level is known as a model stock. Meeting the model stock level is also an area requiring optimization. Because the movement of product to meet the model stock, called the stock transfer, needs to be in economic shipping units such as complete unit loads or a full truckload, there are a series of decisions that must be made. Many existing distribution-requirements-planning systems round the quantity up to the nearest full shipping unit. For example, the creation of truckloads as economic shipment units requires optimization systems to ensure that axle constraints and space constraints are met while loading can be achieved in a damage-free way. This is generally achieved by continuing to add time-phased requirements until the loads meet some minimum weight or cube. More sophisticated optimization algorithms take into account stackability constraints, load and unloading rules, palletizing logic, warehouse efficiency and load stability with an objective to reduce transportation spend (minimize 'shipping air').

Optimization solutions are typically part of, or linked to, the company's replenishment systems distribution requirements planning, so that orders can be automatically generated to maintain the model stock profile.

Supply-chain optimization may include refinements at various stages of the product lifecycle, so that new, ongoing and obsolete items are optimized in different ways, and adaptations for different classes of products, for example seasonal merchandise. It should also factor in risks and unexpected constraints that often affect a global supply chain's efficiency, including sudden spikes in fuel costs, material shortages, natural disasters such as hurricanes, and instability of global politics.

Whilst most software vendors are offering supply-chain optimization as a packaged solution and integrated in ERP software, some vendors are running the software on behalf of their clients as application service providers.

== Claimed advantages ==
Firstly, the techniques being applied to supply-chain optimization are claimed to be academically credible. Most of the specialist companies that have been created as a result of research projects are in academic institutions or consulting firms: and they point to research articles, white papers, academic advisors and industry reviews to support their credibility.

Secondly, the techniques are claimed to be commercially effective. The companies publish case studies that show how clients have achieved significant and measurable benefits in terms of reduced inventory and lower logistics cost levels, while typically maintaining or improving customer service through better predictability and improved availability. Kokoris notes that a supply chain optimization initiative can represent "an untapped opportunity to realize increased short and long-term cash flows and cost savings". However, there is limited published data outside of these case studies, and a reluctance for some practitioners to publish details of their successes (which may be commercially sensitive), therefore hard evidence is difficult to come by. Last, not least, independent advisors or benchmarks show the stickiness and benefits achieved in specific sub-sectors.

The different routines in supply-chain optimization have a mature status, allowing companies to gain a competitive advantage through increased effectiveness and measurable savings. Supply chain optimization can also bring in a better quality of clothes, better collaboration, and increased profits.

== Direct plant shipments ==
Also known as direct shipment, direct plant shipment (DPS) is a method of delivering goods from the plant to the customer directly. At the same time regional centers, strategically located, provide overnight shipments to the maximum number of customers. This delivery scheme reduces transportation and storage costs.

== See also ==
- Demand optimization
- Forecasting
- Service level
