= Demand optimization =

Application of processes and tools to maximize return on sales

Demand optimization is the application of processes and tools to maximize return on sales. This usually involves the application of mathematical modeling techniques using computer software.

It has particular applications in retail, where merchants wish to identify the best combination of price and promotion to achieve desired sales, gross margin, inventory or market share objectives.

The methods used are similar to those applied in the related field of supply chain optimization, where mathematical algorithms are applied to large databases of sales data to help predict future outcomes. In the case of demand optimization, as well as in house sales history, there may be competitive pricing information.

Because it is still a new field, authoritative data on the benefits of demand optimization is not widely available, although suppliers offer case studies of early adopters which claim rapid return on investment, especially in the optimization of the timing and level of price markdowns.

== See also ==
- Demand shortfall
- Price
- Profit maximization
- Yield management
- Price discrimination
