= Decal =

Pattern or image that can be moved to another surface upon contact

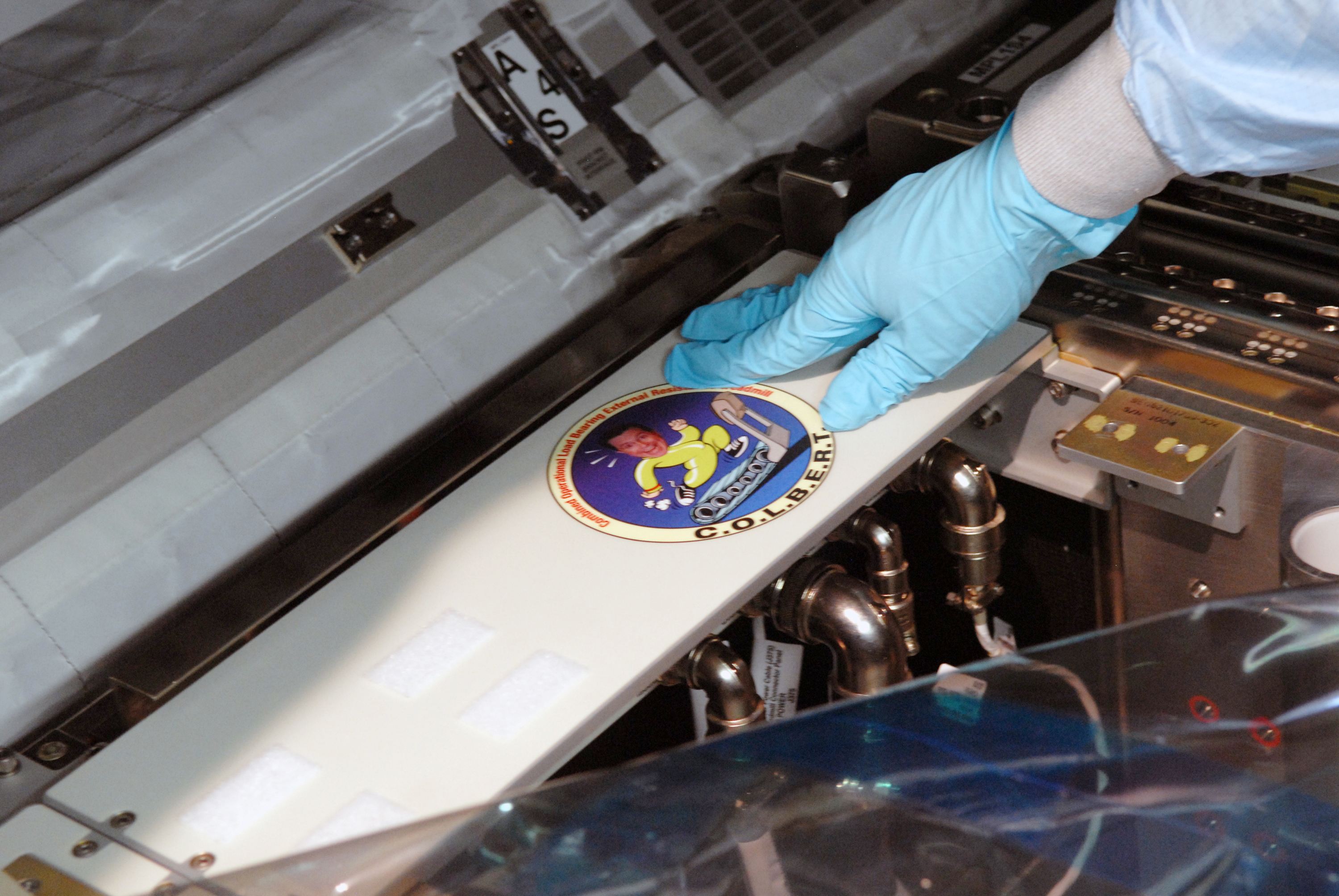
A decal being attached to a piece of machinery

A decal (/ˈdiːkæl/, US also /dɪˈkæl/, CAN /ˈdɛkəl/) or transfer is a plastic, cloth, paper, or ceramic substrate that has a pattern or image printed on it which can be moved to another surface upon contact, usually with the aid of heat or water.

The word is short for decalcomania, a decorative technique by which engravings and prints are transferred to pottery or other materials. The technique was invented by Simon François Ravenet (1706-1774), an engraver from France who later moved to England and perfected the process he called "décalquer" (which means "to copy by tracing"); it became widespread during the decal craze or mania of the late 19th century.

== Properties ==
The term "decal" refers to the mass-produced art transfer in two different states:

1. As manufactured, which consists of the artwork printed on the upper side of a paper or film label stock, temporarily affixed by a typically water or heat soluble adhesive to the upper side of a silicone- or other release agent-coated paper or film backing stock. Decals are produced, shipped, and stored in this composite state.

2. As applied, where only the adhesive-backed artwork remains, affixed to its desired (and appropriate) substrate, temporarily or permanently as designed.

Two variations include the traditional water-slide or water-dip, with the artwork printed on water-resistant paper coated with a layer of water-soluble adhesive, and a dry peel-and-stick format using a standard adhesive—which technically is not a decal, as there is no "art transfer", rather an adhesive-backed label known as a sticker or "vinyl-cut decal".

== Modern production process ==
Mass-production of vinyl decals starts with large rolls of vinyl sheet. Vinyl is fed through a cutting plotter or large-format printer/cutter which prints the desired image and cuts out the desired shapes. Designs are typically created using specialized computer software and sent to the machines electronically. Modern cutting systems have evolved to achieve sub-millimeter precision on die-cut decals through automated processes and sophisticated blade pressure control.

After the patterns are cut, excess vinyl on the sheet is removed in a process called weeding. Finally, a paper pre-mask can be applied to the top of the vinyl design allowing easy application of multiple letters and shapes.

A recent innovation involves the inclusion of a radio frequency identification (RFID) circuit (chip and antenna) in the paper or film facestock.

== Applications ==
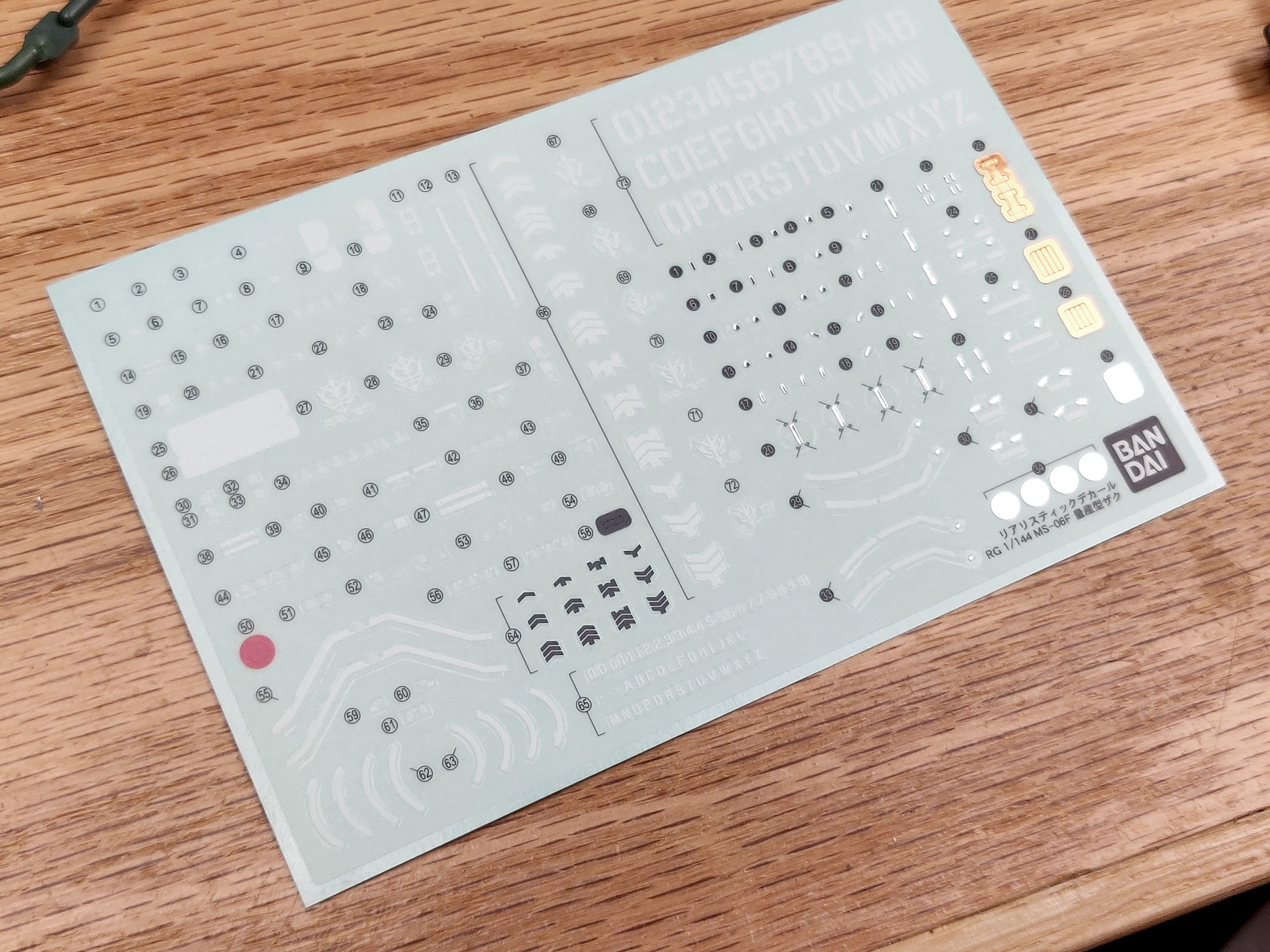
Decal sheet for plastic model

Decals were popularly associated from the mid-20th century on with hot rod automobiles and plastic models. Along with stickers they are used to "personalize" items, such as musical instruments or sports gear.

Government agencies (and some private-public partnerships) use permanent peel-and-stick stickers on vehicles for identification. These "decals" are referred to as fleet markings and are required by law on all fire and law enforcement vehicles in the US. Most fleet markings are created from reflective vinyl with an adhesive backing that is applied in a peel-and-stick manner.

== Methods of printing ==
- Inkjet printing
- Laser printing
- Offset printing
- Embossing
- Photocopier
- Thermal printing

== See also ==
- Bumper sticker
- Ceramic decal
- Country tag
- Dry transfer
- Lithography
- Sticker
- Wall decal
