= Luggage label =

Identifiable item

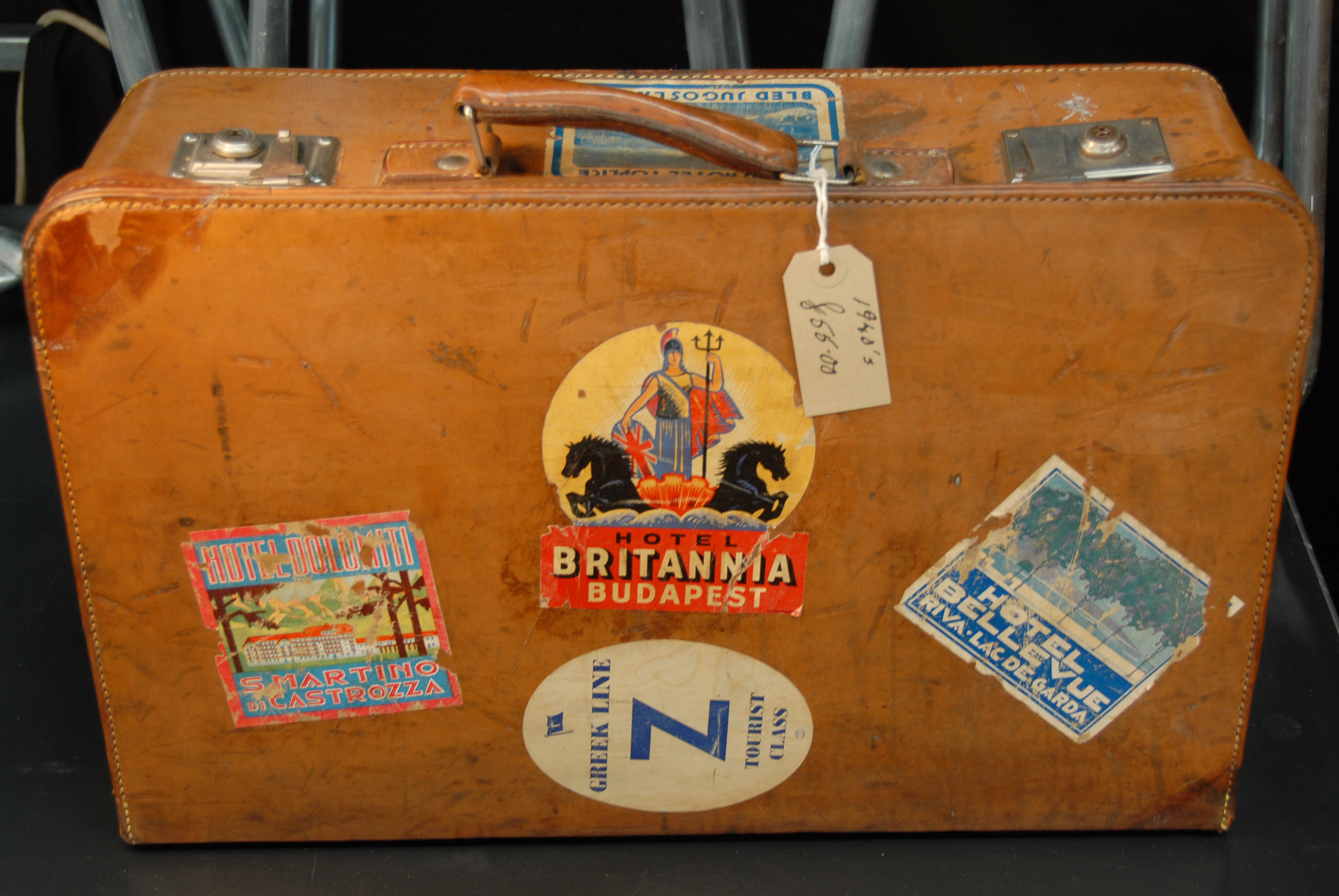
A suitcase with several luggage stickers

A luggage label, luggage sticker, baggage sticker or baggage label is an adhesive label placed over a traveler's luggage for identification purposes. Usually issued by hotels, restaurants, railways and cruise companies, they became popular between the mid-19th century and the early 20th century, in the so-called Golden Age of Travel, with the popularization of mass tourism and the development of railroads, ocean liners and eventually of air travel.

Aside their utilitarian purpose, luggage labels were also a form of advertisement, sporting elaborate designs; after the latter half of the 20th century, their use dwindled, becoming vintage collection items since then.

== Forerunner ==
The Romans used baggage labels made from lead.

== See also ==
- Bag tags
