= Price markdown =

Deliberate reduction in the retail price

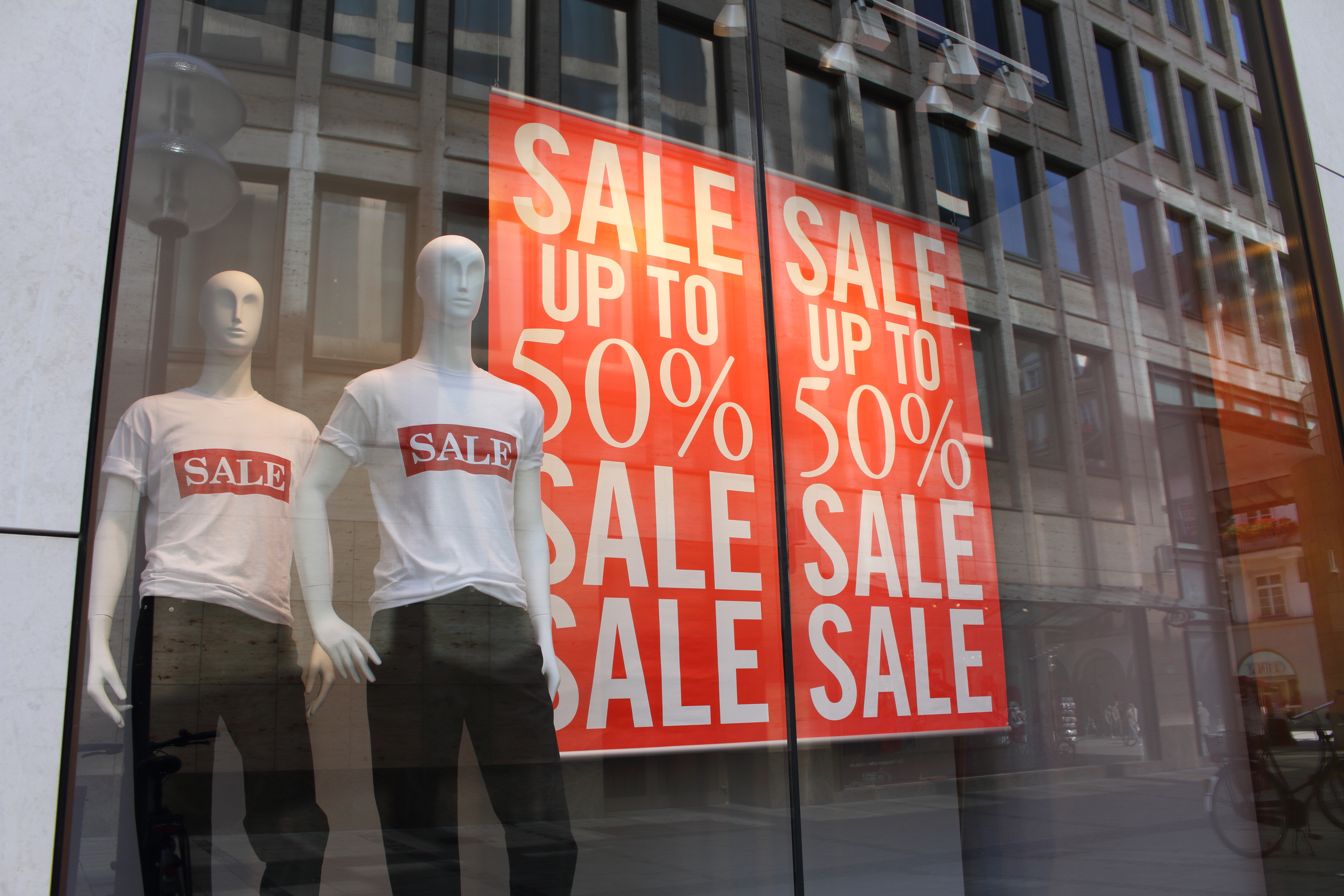
Promotional banners for a shop sale

A price markdown is a deliberate reduction in the selling price of retail merchandise. It is used to increase the velocity (rate of sale) of an article, typically for clearance at the end of a season, or to sell off obsolete merchandise at the end of its life.

The timing and level of markdowns in a selling season is critical to maximising return on sales. This is often measured as revenue realization: the proportion of the potential original selling price achieved. For example, a revenue realization of 50% means that only half the potential full-price sales value was achieved by the end of the season. It is also important in minimizing terminal inventory, i.e. the amount of merchandise left when the season is finished.

A recent trend has been to use demand optimization software to establish the most desirable timing and level of markdown. Optimization techniques can be used to determine where the best combination of revenue realization and terminal inventory is going to come from, for example, comparing a tactic of low-level markdowns from early in the season against one of later, deeper reductions.

== Tools for markdown ==
=== Discount stickers ===
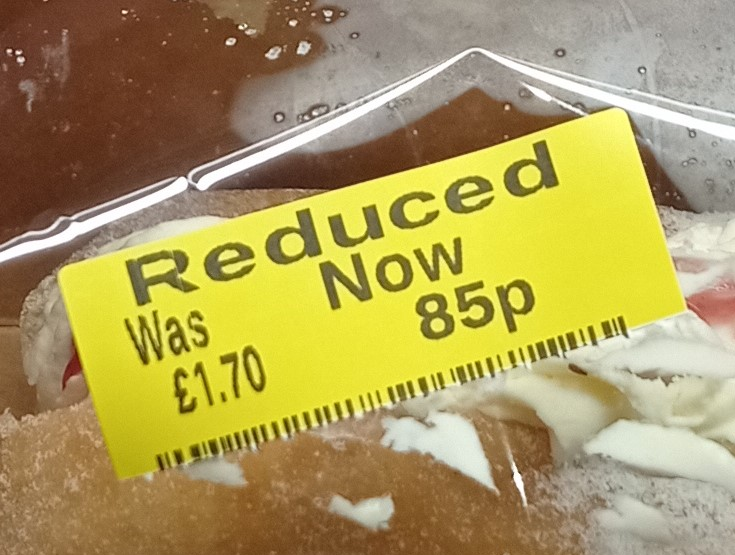
Yellow discount sticker in a British supermarket

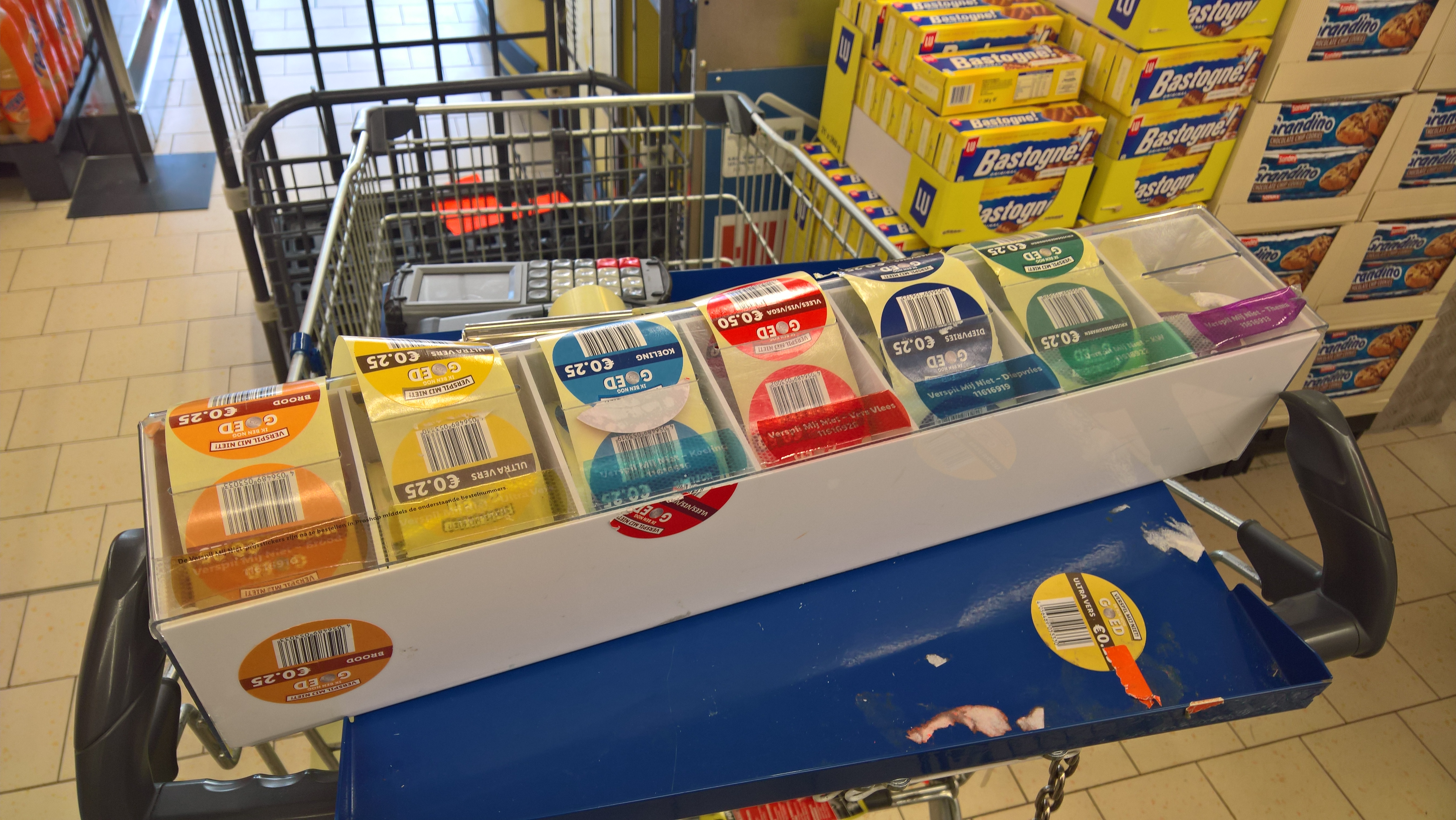
Colour-coding is sometimes used for discount stickers

Discount stickers are a price markdown that are used to alert shoppers to goods which have been reduced in price, such as food approaching its sell-by date or inventory in discount clothing or outlet stores. Some stores, especially discount clothing stores, have been accused of using discount stickers to create the impression of price markdowns when there is none.

In certain contexts, specific types of stickers have had additional meaning. For example, yellow stickers are used for this purpose by several British supermarket chains, including Asda, Sainsbury's, and Tesco. Post Brexit cost of living increases in the UK, have highlighted the importance of "yellow sticker shopping" as a way to deal with real price increases.
