= Discount sticker =

Method of marking reductions in price

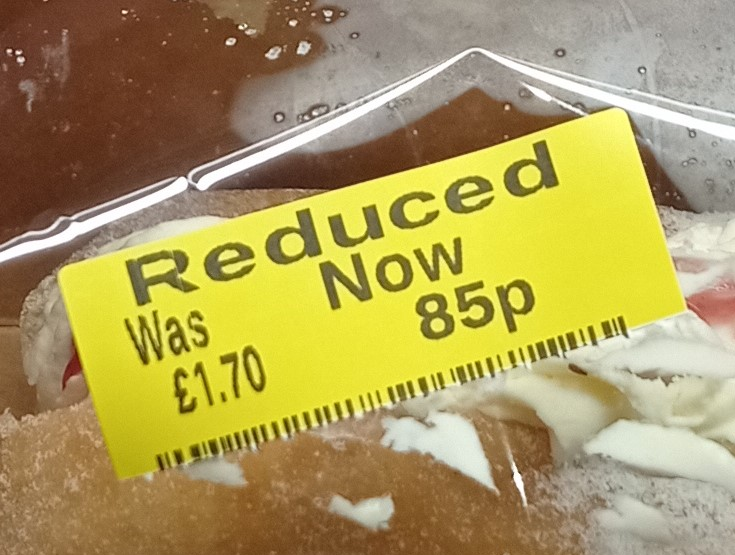
Yellow discount sticker in a British supermarket

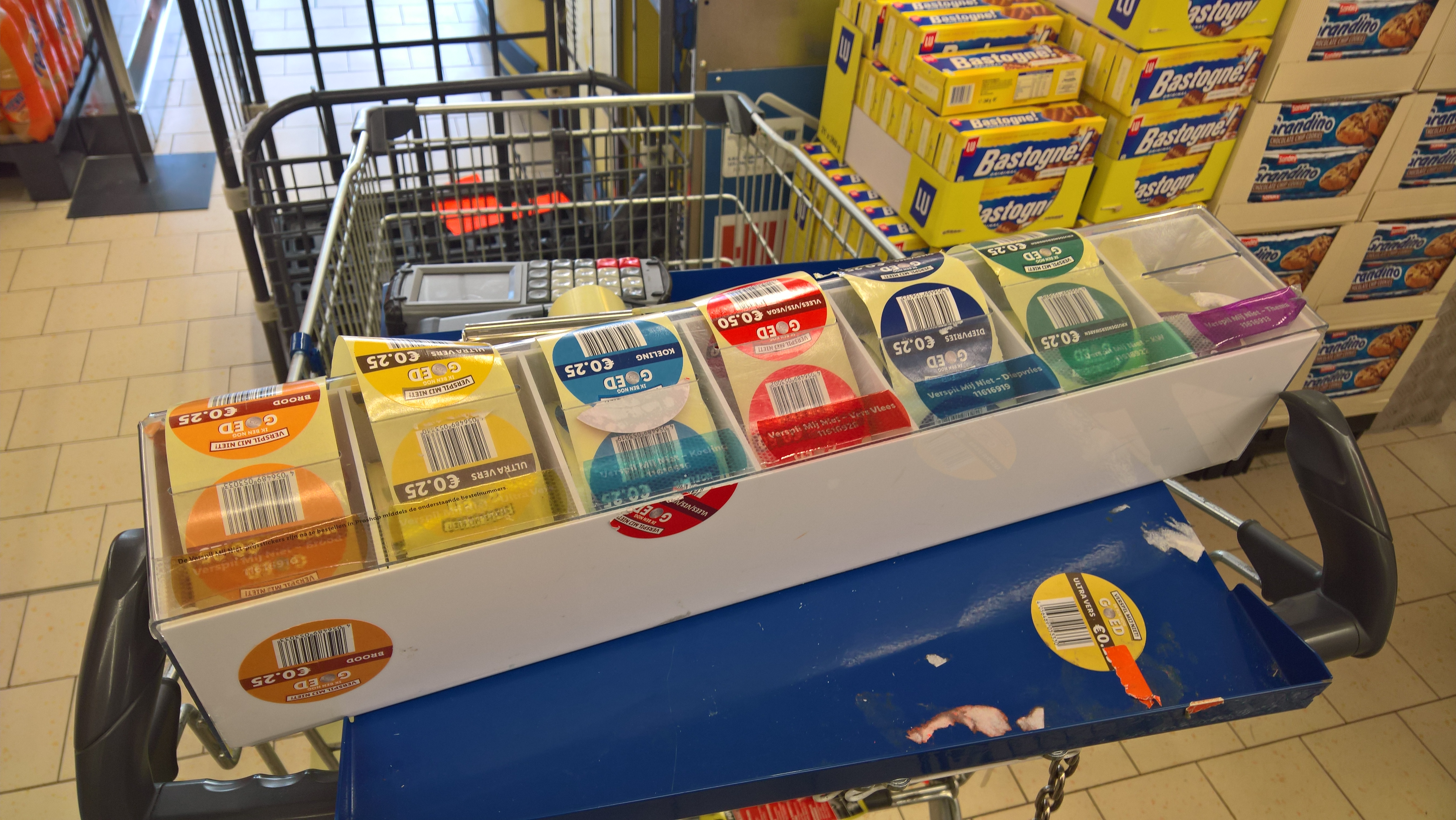
Colour-coding is sometimes used for discount stickers.

Discount stickers are a price markdown that are used to alert shoppers to goods which have been reduced in price, such as food approaching its sell-by date or inventory in discount clothing or outlet stores. Some stores, especially discount clothing stores, have been accused of using discount stickers to create the impression of price markdowns when there is none.

In certain contexts, specific types of stickers have had additional meaning. For example, yellow stickers are used for this purpose by several British supermarket chains, including Asda, Sainsbury's, and Tesco. Post Brexit cost of living increases in the UK, have highlighted the importance of "yellow sticker shopping" as a way to deal with real price increases.

== Grocery markdowns ==
Marking down food prices at grocery stores allows for the stores to better manage their stock, and ensure some return on value of the good. Especially for food that are perishable or has expiration dates, having an inventory management strategy that includes markdowns reduces food waste, simplifies inventory management and increases the likelihood of some profitability when satisfying a consumer need or demand for discounted prices.

Improvements in the early 2000s to inventory management software has made applying discounts to perishable goods easier. When consumers understand this practice of creating discounts on foods after perishability dates, the discounts don't harm consumer perceptions of the brands marked down.

=== In Australia ===
Yellow stickers have been used in Australia, including at Woolworths supermarkets.

=== In Japan ===
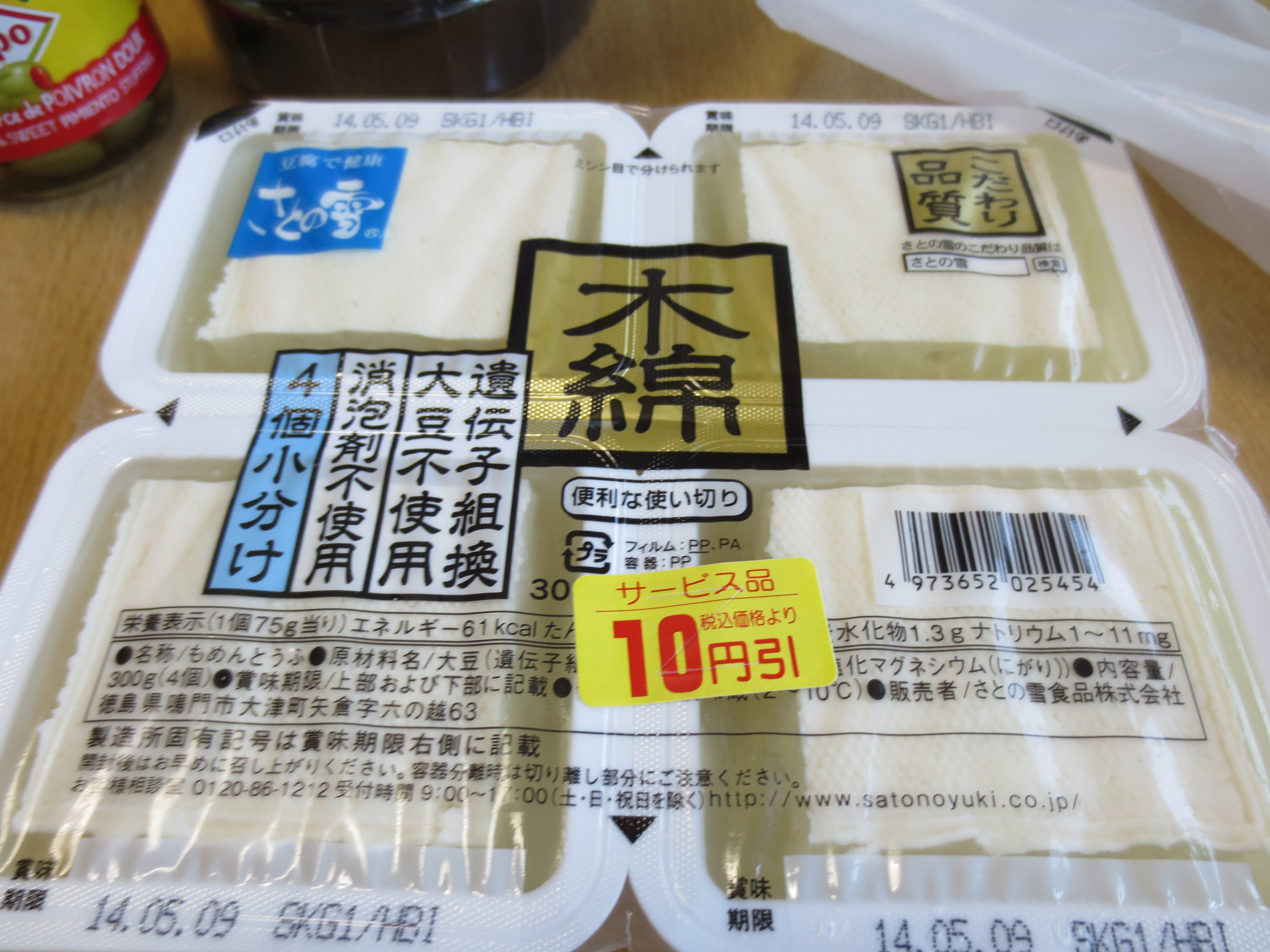
Yellow discount sticker in use in Japan

Looking for yellow sticker-tagged items has been noted as a way to save money when shopping in Japan. One chain, Gyomu Super, has chosen to allow consumers to pick which items they place their sticker on, allowing customers to markdown up to 4 items.

=== In the United Kingdom ===
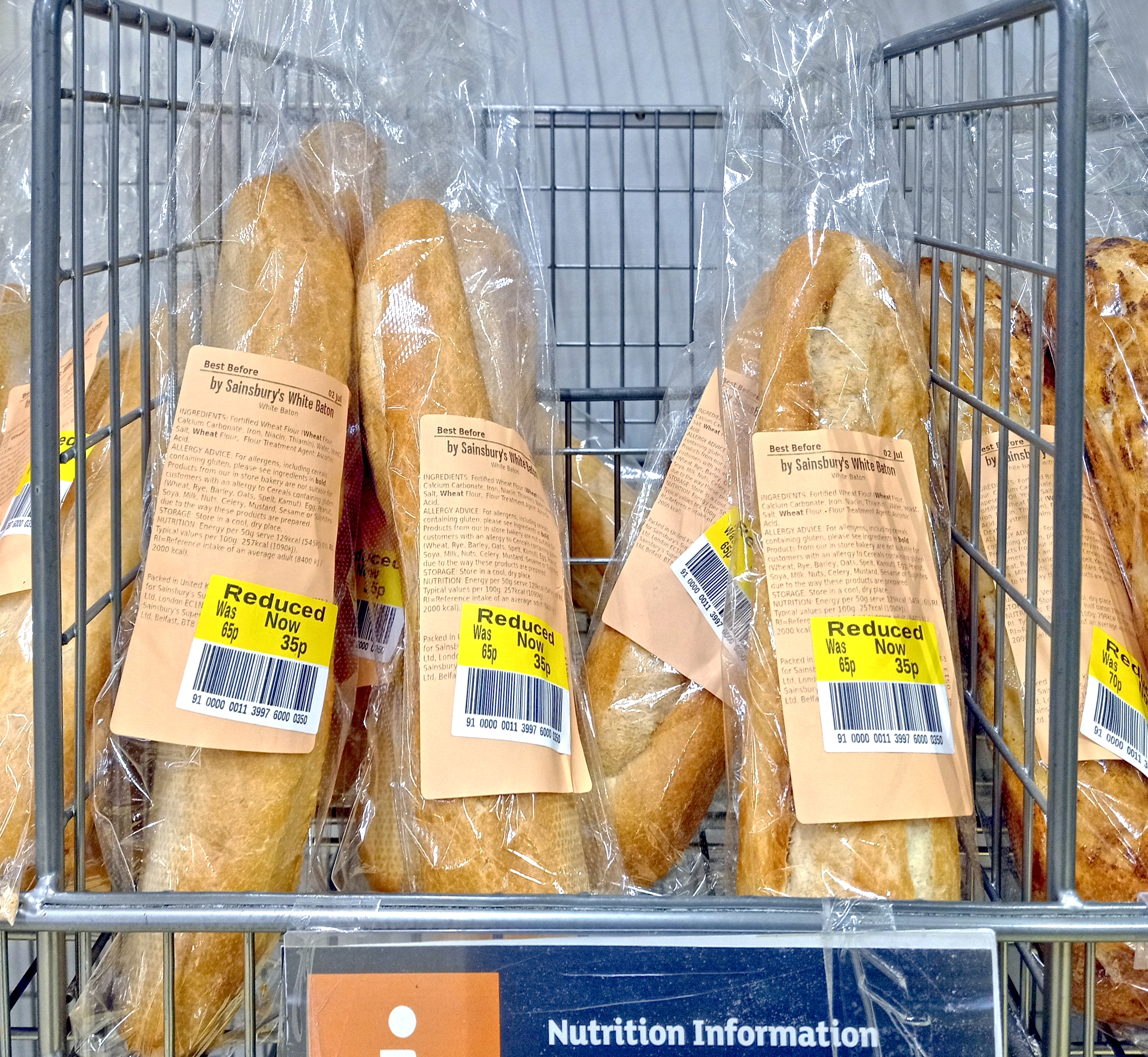
Bread reduced to clear in a Sainsbury's supermarket, London

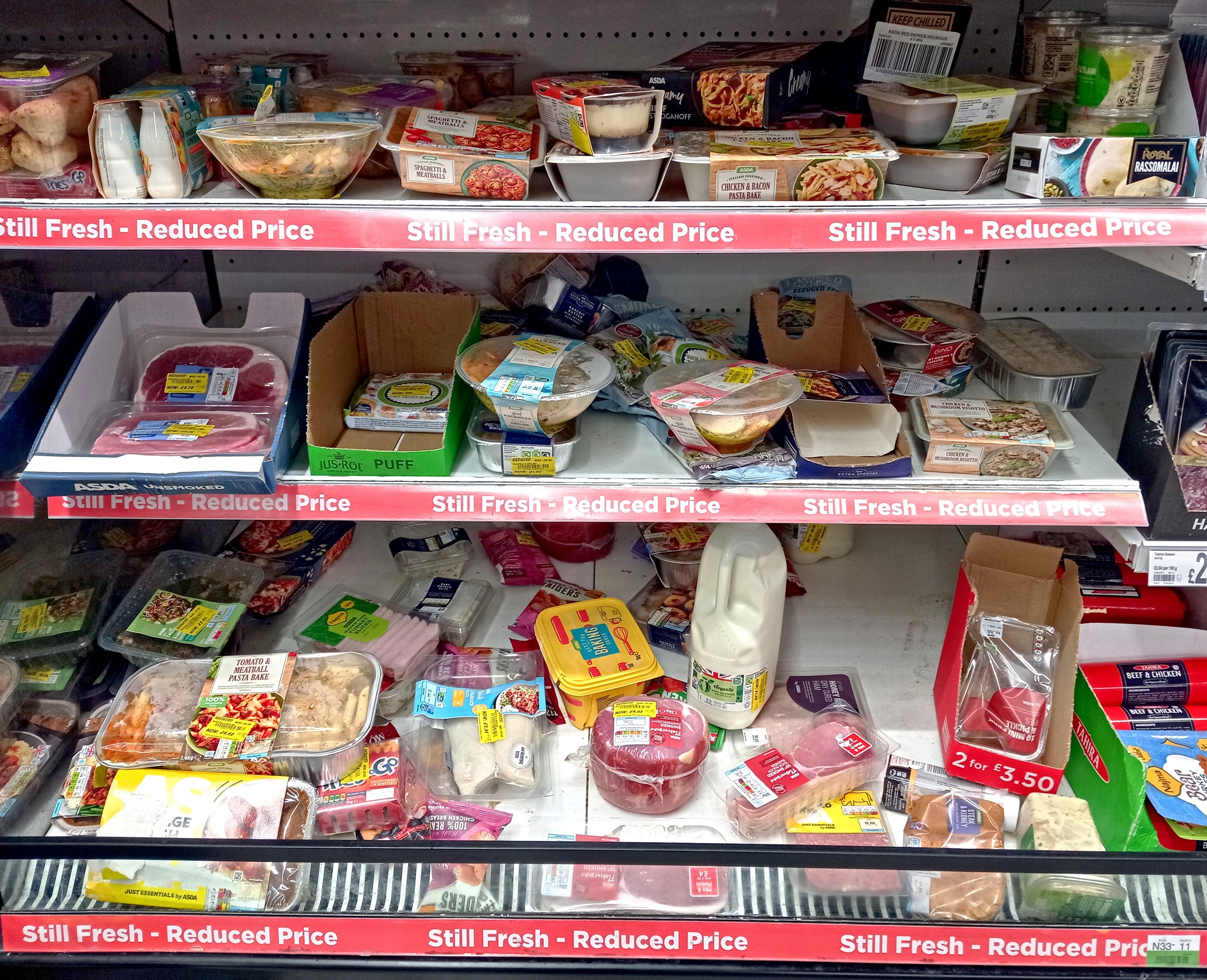
Yellow stickers at Asda

In the United Kingdom, the stickers have been in use since at least 1993 when a director of J Sainsbury supermarkets wrote to The Times, in response to a customer complaint, to explain that a "bright yellow sticker" was placed across the item's original barcode to prevent it being scanned at the original price.

In 1999, Lynne Truss referenced yellow stickers in an article in The Times lamenting the low quality of a football team, as though they had been picked at Asda at yellow-sticker time before their shelf life expired. In 2013, journalist Candida Crewe explained in The Times that she was able to live the "high life", despite having little money, by using a variety of money-saving techniques that included being "addicted to those cheerful yellow 'reduced' stickers at the end of a supermarket's day", loyalty cards, and wearing only black.

In 2018, yellow-sticker shopping was the subject of a paper in Area, the academic journal of the Royal Geographical Society. The authors noted the unpredictable nature of the practice with success being celebrated and described in ways that contrasted with the more mundane weekly shop.

In May 2023, it was reported that according to research by Barclays Bank, 38 per cent of British shoppers were buying yellow-stickered items to make their money go further during the cost-of-living crisis. It was reported that the items were so in demand that Tesco staff had been forced to surround them with barriers while applying the stickers to prevent disorder as buyers grabbed the reductions. The barriers had first been used by Tesco during the COVID-19 pandemic for social distancing purposes. Design Week reported that an app had been developed to help buyers incorporate the discounted purchases into their home cooking.

In July 2023, the BBC noted that the colour yellow, used because it was thought to be "warm and welcoming", had also been adopted by retailers in their labels for items that were permanently discounted for members of loyalty schemes, such as the Tesco Clubcard scheme.

Food still unsold after being reduced in price may be donated to a food bank or sent for anaerobic digestion. In 2025 Tesco announced it would run a trial offering still unsold items which had not been claimed by a charity or staff to customers for free at the end of the day.

As of 2017, some UK budget supermarkets, such as Aldi, do not use the stickers.

In December 2023, The Daily Telegraph reported that the use of yellow stickers might end as British supermarkets introduced dynamic pricing models that automatically reduced the cost of goods as they reached their expiration date. Electronic shelf labels (ESLs) were being trialled that were hoped to reduce labour costs in applying discount stickers and production costs by more clearly signalling pricing differentials between packaged and unpackaged fresh produce. It was hoped they would also cut food waste by more closely aligning prices to customer demand.

== Clothing retail ==
Retailers of major brands such as Nordstroms have developed specific outlet stores to direct market "discounted" lines of clothing, some of which are designed specifically for the outlets. Some discount clothing stores have been accused of using discount stickers to create the impression of price markdowns when there is none.

In 2012, JC Penny tried to stop using discount stickering and other discounts, in exchange for a permanent across the board markdown. The company rolled backed this pricing strategy after sales declined due to lack of discount stickers and other consumer signals of "getting good deals". The period where prices were adjusted upward, resulted in price stickers that increased the price paired with huge discounts, creating consumer confusion.

== See also ==
- Food loss and waste
