= Decalcomania =

Technique for transferring engravings and prints

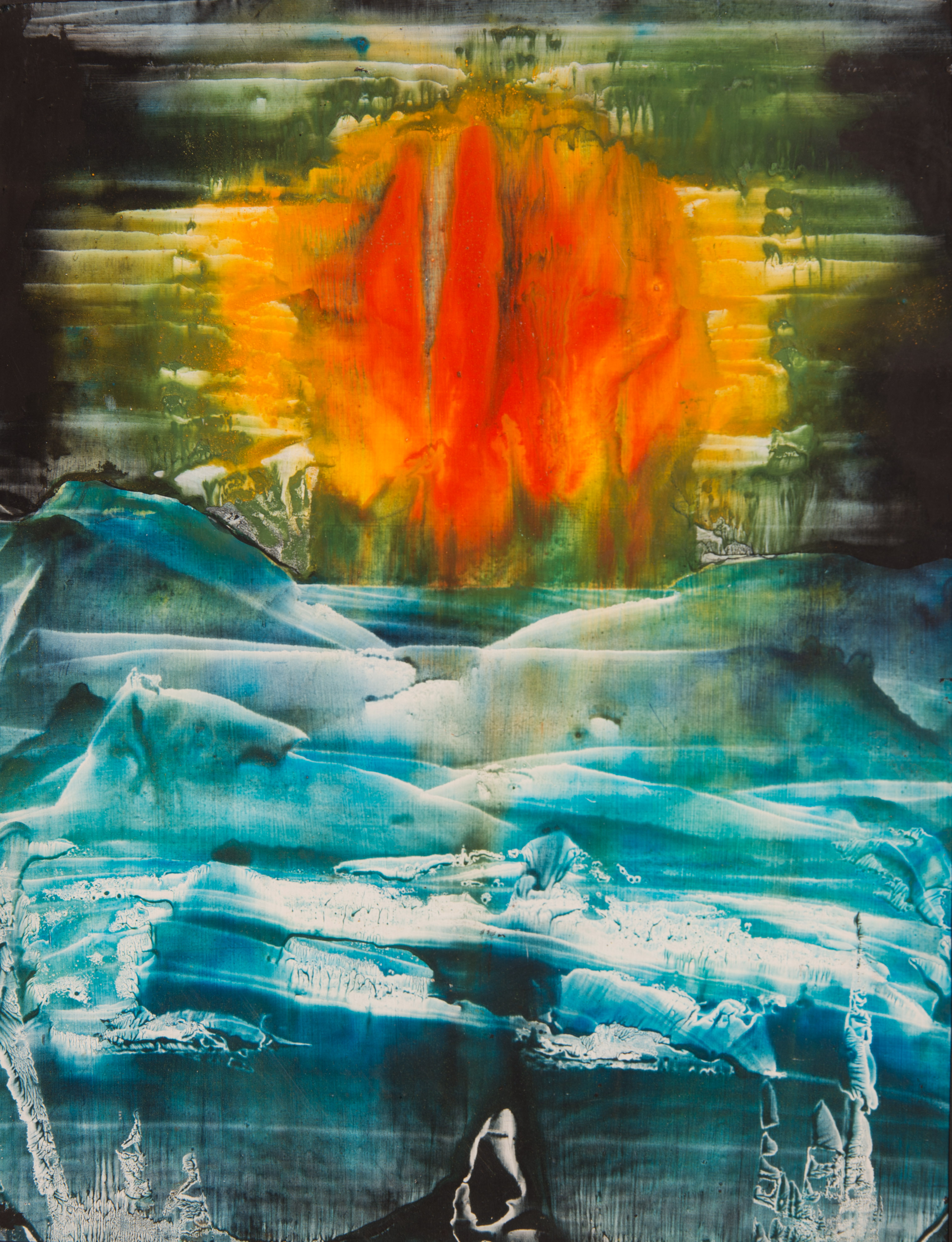
Fire & Ice H. Grobe (1975) – Example of a painting made with the decalcomania technique

Decalcomania (from French: décalcomanie) is a decorative technique by which engravings and prints may be transferred to pottery or other materials.

A shortened version of the term is used for a mass-produced commodity, art transfer, or product label, known as a "decal".

Decalcomania is adapted from French décalcomanie, equivalent to décalquer, "to transfer a tracing of", plus English -mania. The verb "décalquer" is based on Italian calcare, "to stomp, trample", ultimately from Latin calx, "heel". Decalcomania was first recorded in English in the early 1860s.

== History ==
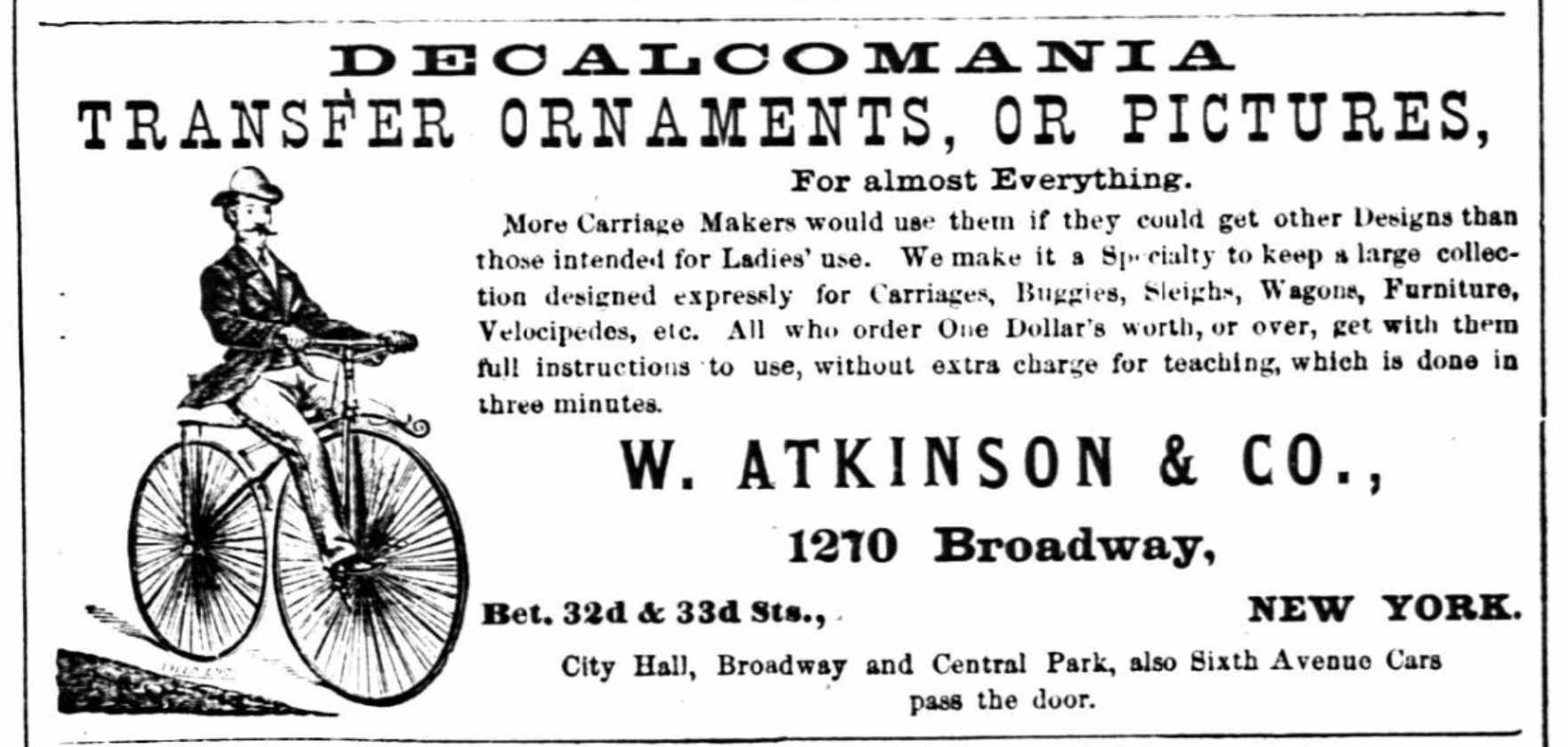
Advertisement for the decalcomania process in the 1870 New York City directory

Decalcomania was first used commercially in England about 1750 and imported into the United States at least as early as 1865. Its invention has been attributed to Simon François Ravenet (1706–1774), an engraver from France who later moved to England and perfected the process, which he called "décalquer" (derived from French papier calque, "tracing paper"). The first known use of the French term décalcomanie, in Thomas Hubbard's Valuable Secrets Concerning Arts and Trades (1795), was followed by the English decalcomania in an 1865 trade show catalog (The Tenth Exhibition of the Massachusetts Charitable Mechanic Association); it was popularized during the ceramic transfer craze of the mid-1870s. By around 1875 decalcomania designs printed in colored glazes were being applied to porcelain, an extension of transfer printing, which had been developed in England since the late 18th century. The decalcomania was applied over an already glazed surface and re-fired. The process began to be mechanized from the turn of the 20th century.

== Artists ==
The surrealist Óscar Domínguez referred to his work as "decalcomania with no preconceived object". He took up the technique in 1936, using gouache spread thinly on a sheet of paper or other surface (glass has been used), which is then pressed onto another surface such as a canvas. Domínguez used black gouache, though colours later made their appearance.

German artist Max Ernst also practiced decalcomania, as did Hans Bellmer and Remedios Varo.

French surrealist Yves Tanguy used the technique in his 1936 works Paysage I and Paysage II, which were included in the Guggenheim Museum's exhibition "Surrealism: Two Private Eyes" (4 June – 12 September 1999, New York).

== Fractals ==
The production of decalcomanias has not been confined to art. At Yale University, fingerpaint decalcomanias have been analysed for their tendency to generate fractals when the process is repeated several times on the same paper.

== See also ==
- Decal, a mass-produced derivative of decalcomania
- Surrealist techniques
- Rhizome (philosophical concept of connectedness)
