= Simon François Ravenet =

French engraver (1706–1774)

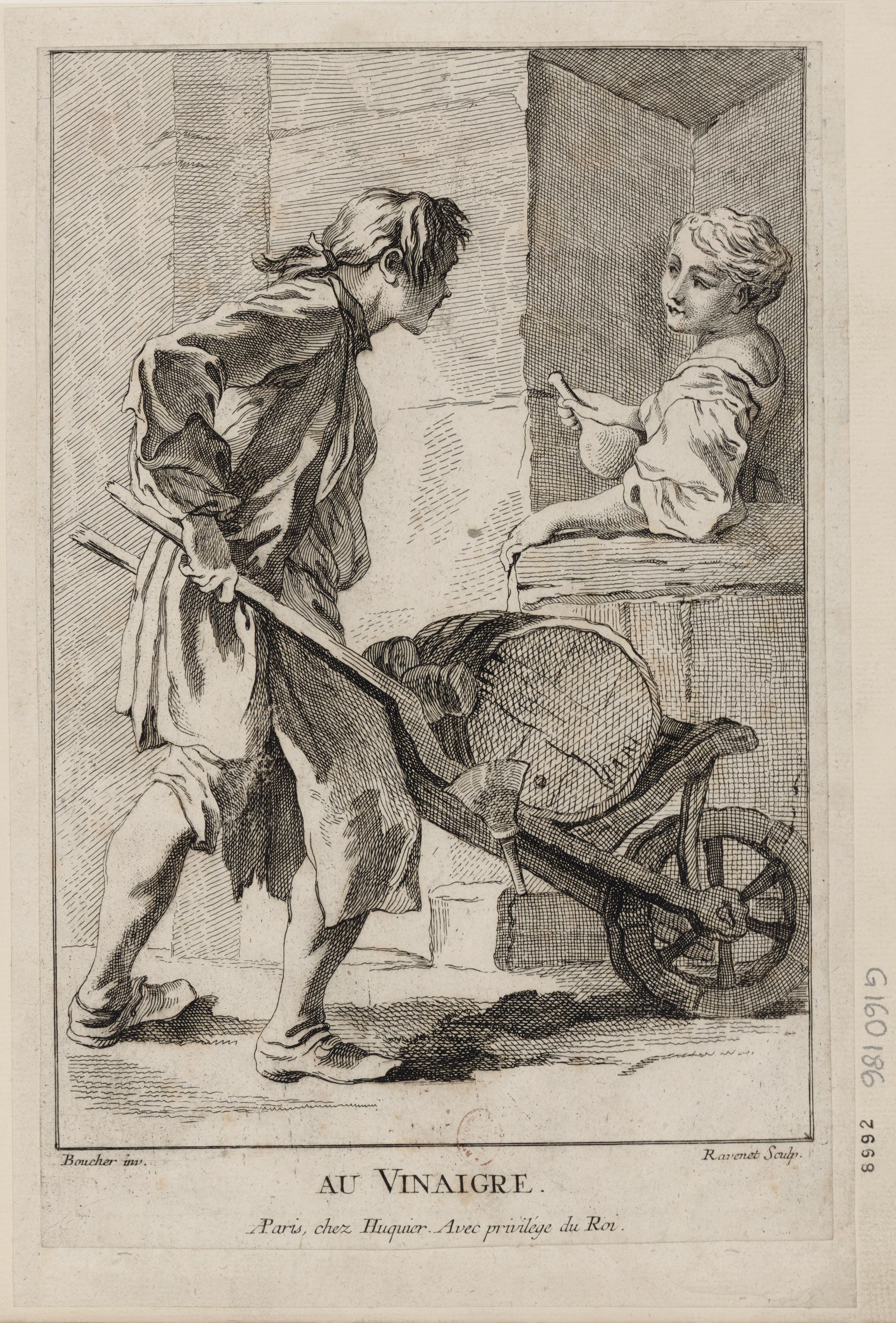
Vinegar by Simon François Ravenet, Bibliothèque nationale de France, 1761

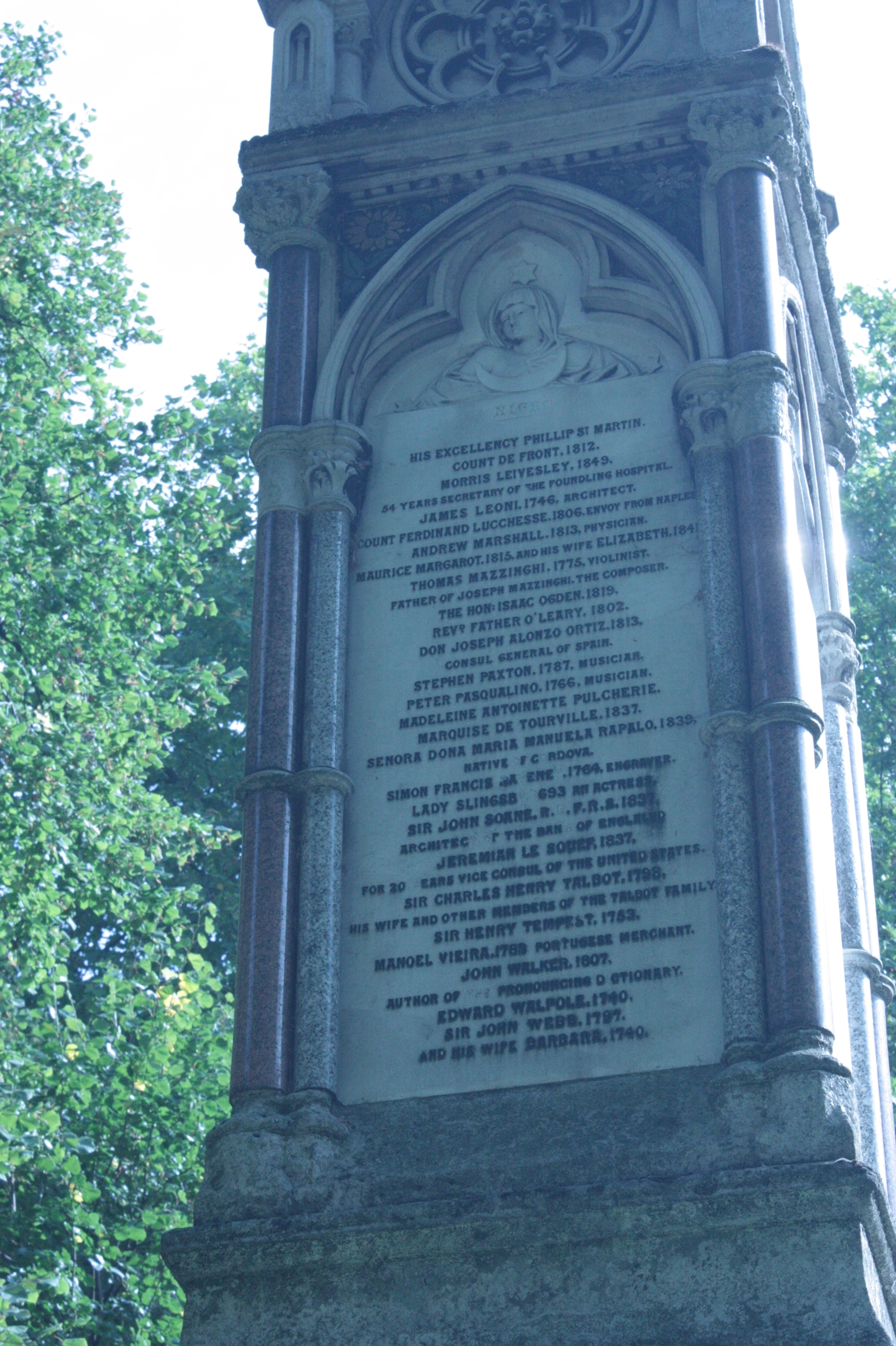
Ravenet's name on the Burdett Coutts Memorial, Old St Pancras Churchyard, London (midway, some letters missing)

Simon François Ravenet (1706 – c. 4 April 1774) was a French engraver. In Britain he is usually termed Simon Francis Ravenet. He was one of William Hogarth's assistants.

== Biography ==
He was born in Paris, where he studied engraving under Jacques-Philippe Le Bas before moving to London in 1750, where he founded a school of line engraving and is credited with the revival of engraving in England. His pupils included the engravers John Hall and William Wynne Ryland. He is known to have engraved a portrait of Joshua Reynolds but primarily committed the works of other artists into engraved form. He developed Décalquer, from which the term decal derives. Between 1767 and 1769 he was a member of the Society of Artists, and exhibited within their ranks. In 1770 he became one of six engravers who were associate members of Great Britain's Royal Society of Arts. His son, Simon Ravenet, was also an engraver, active in the Parma Academy of Fine Arts. He died in London. Ravenet was buried in Old St. Pancras Churchyard on 6 April 1774.

== Legacy ==
Some of his work is on display at the National Portrait Gallery as well as at the Cleveland Museum of Art. His name is listed on the Burdett-Coutts Memorial Sundial. Battersea has a "Ravenet Street" in his honor.
