= Ceramic decal =

A ceramic decal is a transfer system that is used to apply pre-printed images or designs to ceramic tableware, ornamental ware and tiles, and glass containers.

A decal typically comprises three layers: the color, or image, layer which comprises the decorative design; the covercoat, a clear protective layer, which may incorporate a low-melting glass; and the backing paper on which the design is printed by screen printing or lithography. There are various methods of transferring the design while removing the backing-paper, some of which are suited to machine application.

The decal method is often used for the decoration of pottery. A special paper is used but the ceramic colours cannot be printed directly and the actual printing is done in varnish and the color then dusted on. The decal is placed colored side-down on the sized ware, rubbed firmly, and the paper then sponged off.

== Equivalent terms ==
The term "ceramic decal" is an American equivalent to the British English terms "transfer" or "litho".

== See also ==
- Transferware
