= Water slide decal =

Type of decal

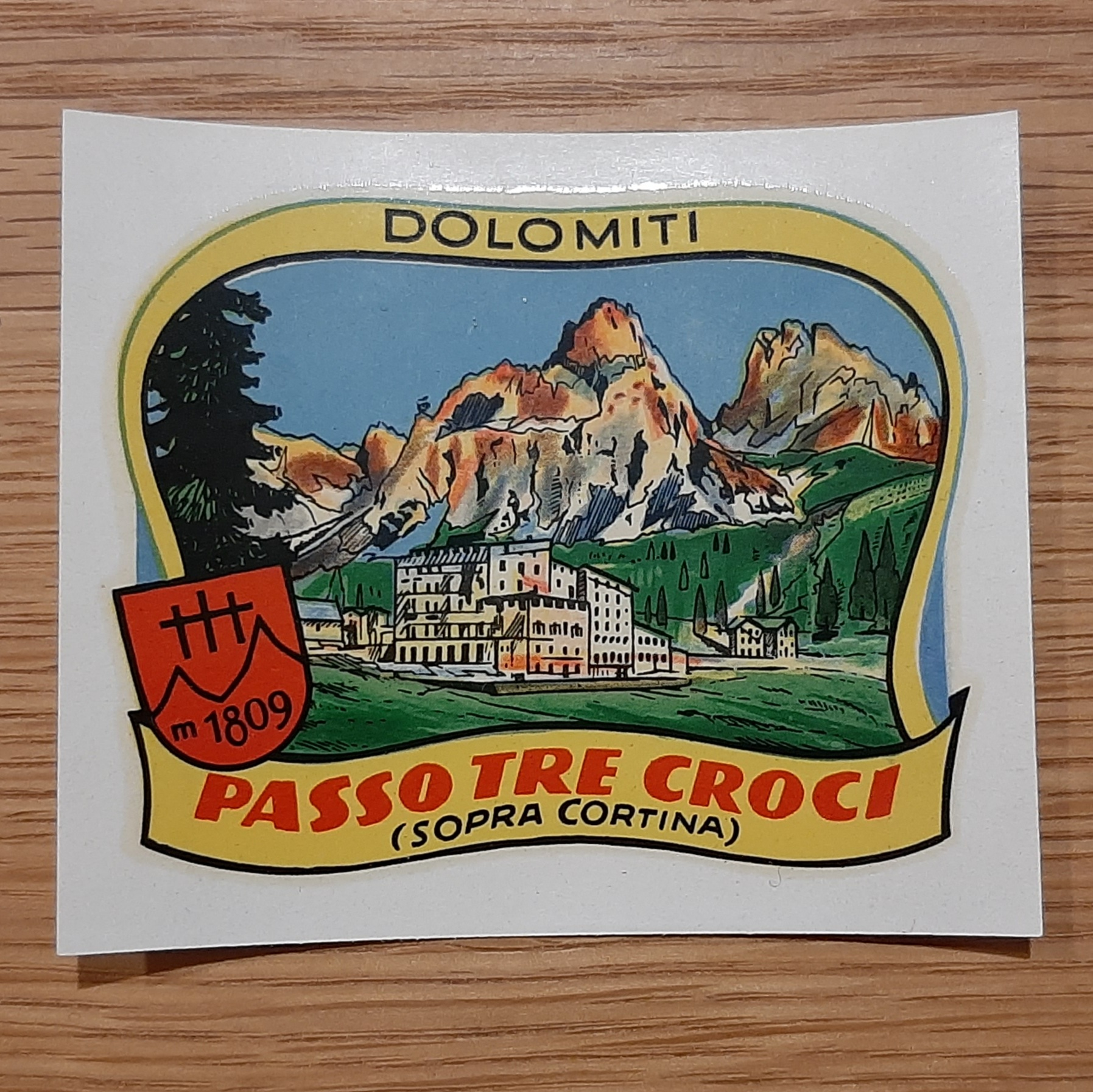
An example of a vintage water slide decal on its white backing paper

Water slide decals (or water transfer decals) are decals which rely on dextrose residue from the decal paper to bond the decal to a surface. A water-based adhesive layer can be added to the decal to create a stronger bond or may be placed between layers of lacquer to create a durable decal transfer. The paper also has a layer of glucose film added prior to the dextrose layer which gives it adhesive properties; the dextrose layer gives the decal the ability to slide off the paper and onto the substrate (lubricity).

Water slide decals are thinner than many other decorative techniques (such as vinyl stickers) and as they are printed, they can be produced to a very high level of detail. As such, they are popular in craft areas such as scale modeling, as well as for labeling DIY electronics devices, such as guitar pedals.

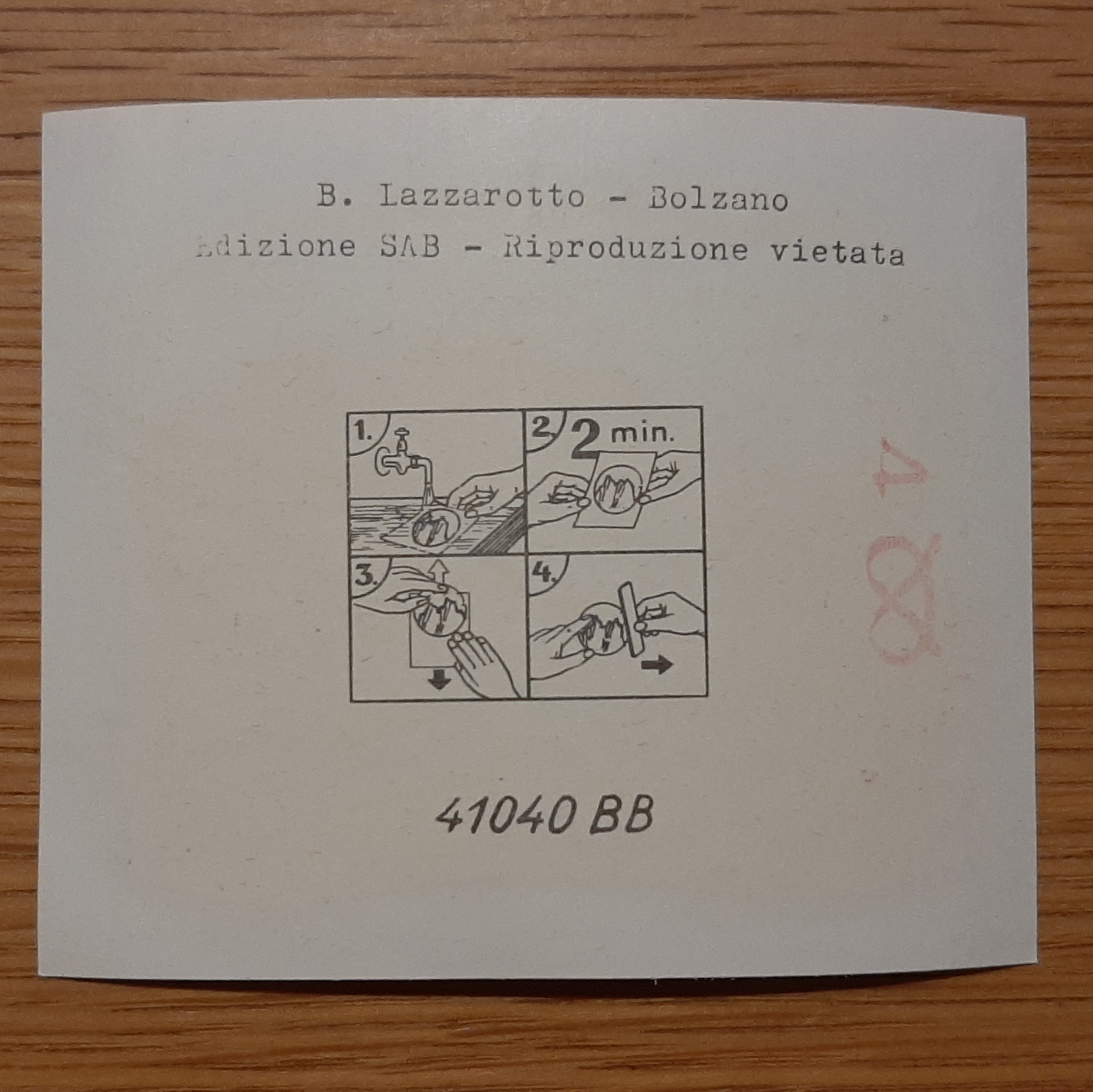
Instructions for use printed on the back of the above decal

Previously, water slide decals were professionally printed and only available in supplied designs, but with the advent of printable decal paper for colour inkjet and laser printers, custom decals can now be produced by the hobbyist or small business.
