= Antonio Giuglini =

Italian opera singer 1825-65

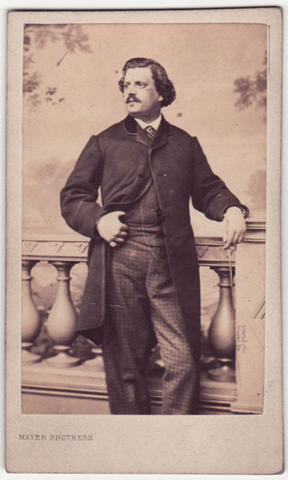
- Born: 1825; Fano, Papal States
- Died: 12 October 1865 (aged 40); Pesaro
- Education: in Italy with Francesco Cellini
- Occupation: Opera singer

Antonio Giuglini (16 or 17 January 1825 – 12 October 1865) was an Italian operatic tenor. During the last eight years of his life, before he developed signs of mental instability, he earned renown as one of the leading stars of the operatic scene in London. He created several major roles for British audiences, appearing in the first London performances of Gounod's Faust and Verdi's Un ballo in maschera. In London, he was the usual stage partner of the great dramatic soprano Thérèse Tietjens.

== Early career in Italy ==
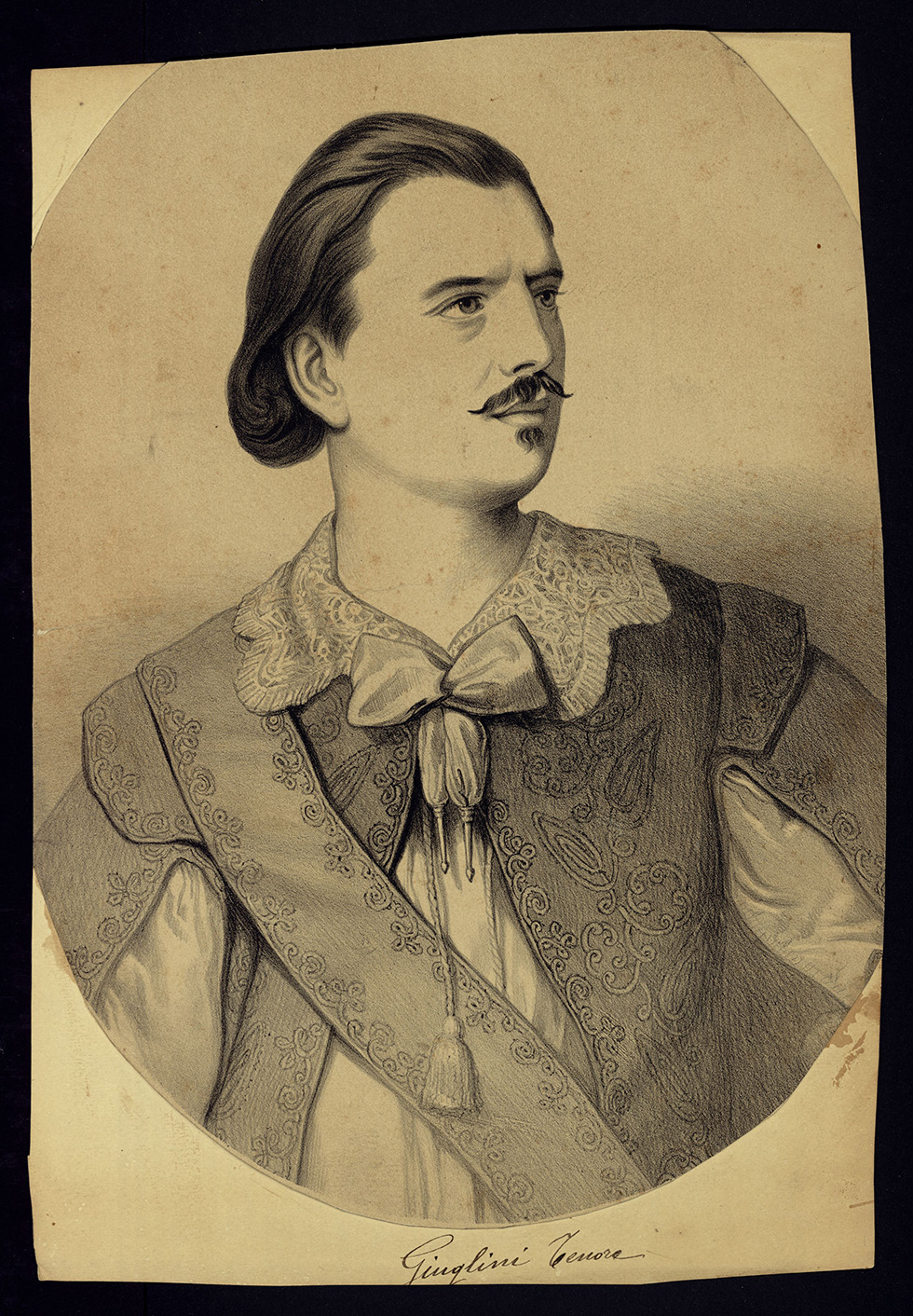
Portrait of Antonio Giuglini

Guiglini was born at Fano in Italy's middle/north-east. He studied in his home country with Francesco Cellini, and made his debut in opera at Fermo.

According to the impresario Benjamin Lumley, Giuglini had been destined for the priesthood. He began in the choir of the metropolitan church of Fermo, where his excellence as a treble, and then as a tenor, attracted attention. He firmly resisted many inducements to appear on the stage until one day he took the place of a member of the Theatre orchestra who fell ill. Soon afterwards, the principal tenor also fell ill, and Giuglini took his place as Jacopo in I due Foscari. He was immediately successful and then had brilliant successes at other theatres. This led him to Milan, where he came to the attention of the Emperor of Austria, who conferred on him the title of chamber-singer (Kammersänger) to his court, and wanted to engage him for Vienna. However, Lumley had already booked him for three years in London, but the Viennese court then secured him in advance for the year 1860.

His first season at La Scala, Milan, in early 1855, was witnessed by Charles Santley who observed that he created 'a perfect furore' and was the hero of the day.

Giuglini was a proof that physical force does not always win: his voice was not powerful, but it was of sympathetic quality, although slightly throaty, and his phrasing was perfect; any ornament he introduced he invariably executed with precision and elegance. He was not a clumsy man, but as an actor he was ungraceful, and lacked intelligence.

Santley saw him there as Raoul (Gli Ugonotti), in which he sang charmingly but lacked the fire and manliness for the role, as Arturo in I Puritani, which rivetted the attention completely, and in selection evenings, when he sang the trio 'Pappataci' from L'italiana in Algeri with Scheggi (buffo) and Ignazio Marini (bass), so popular it had to be repeated throughout the season. On 26 December 1855 he appeared at Teatro Regio di Parma in the first performance of Giovanna de Guzman, the first Italian version of Verdi's Les vêpres siciliennes.

== London 1857–1858 ==
Giuglini made his debut in London for Benjamin Lumley on 14 April 1857, at Her Majesty's Theatre, as Fernando in La favorita, with Mlle Spezia and Sig. Vialetti. Giuglini took the London palms and was immediately approved by the London audience. He joined an already celebrated company which included artists such as Marietta Piccolomini, Marietta Alboni and Thérèse Tietjens. This house was in competition with the newly rebuilt Covent Garden theatre, where Giulia Grisi and Mario led the cast and the box-office under Michael Costa for Frederick Gye. La favorita was followed by La traviata with Mlle Piccolomini, and Giuglini was received with even greater excitement than before: and in I puritani, chosen for the debut of Angiolina Ortolani, he stole the laurels from his partner. His Edgardo in Lucia di Lammermoor, with Piccolomini, was a further sensation:

About his singing there could be no possible difference of opinion. Since the days of Rubini such a remarkable combination of lovely voice with "school" and expression had not been known. The famous "maledizione" (which had sufficed to make the fortune of a tenore robusto like Fraschini), being delivered with profound emotion, took the audience by storm.

As Manrico, opposite Maria Spezia-Aldighieri as Leonora and Marietta Alboni as Azucena, he still held the centre of attention. In the revival of Don Giovanni, with Piccolomini (Zerlina), Mlles Spezia (Donna Anna) and Ortolani (Elvira), Belletti (Leporello), 'the music of Don Ottavio was warbled by the beautiful voice of Giuglini as few had heard it warbled before. The noble air "Dalla sua Pace" was restored by Giuglini on this occasion, and he made a marked sensation by his tender, expressive delivery of it.' He took part in an Italian version of Balfe's The Bohemian Girl (as, La Zingara), with Piccolomini, Alboni, Vialetti and Belletti: 'Giuglini's singing of "Then you'll remember me", in Italian brought with it a pleasure never to be forgotten by those who heard it.' He also gave a 'Festival Performance' of La sonnambula with Mlle Piccolomini and Sig. Belletti.

== With Mapleson and Smith, 1858–1861 ==
Lumley's 1858 season did not begin until after Easter, and for its launch, when the future was very uncertain, he gave a lavish production for the London debut of Thérèse Tietjens, with Giuglini, in Les Huguenots. Even during rehearsal, there was tremendous interest when Tietjens' artistic efforts called forth a response from her Raoul:

As her powerful voice rang through the theatre, and excited the plaudits of all present, so the latent fire of Giuglini became kindled in its turn, and, one artist vying with the other in power and passion of musical declamation, each rehearsal became a brilliant performance. ... By his personation of Raoul Giuglini raised himself to the pinnacle of his profession.

Tietjens and Giuglini next sang Il trovatore, and both productions, attended by the Queen and court, had wildly enthusiastic receptions. On 3 June 1858, for Lumley, he appeared as Rodolfo in the first UK performance of Verdi's Luisa Miller, opposite Piccolomini.

However, as Lumley's management soon afterwards collapsed, Colonel J.H. Mapleson, hoping to revive Her Majesty's company, set up a company at Drury Lane, acquiring some of Lumley's artistes, and in its second season (1858) Giuglini appeared again as Fernando for the debut of Carolina Guarducci, who made a sensational debut despite never having studied the part which she sang (i.e. Leonora), and was afterwards coached by Mme Tietjens. At Drury Lane in July 1859, Giuglini created the role of Arrigo in the first London production of Verdi's Les vêpres siciliennes, opposite Tietjens.

With Edward Tyrrel Smith, the Her Majesty's project was resumed, and in 1860 Tietjens and Giuglini were available to Smith and Mapleson as part of a £16,000 deal with Lumley. English and Italian opera companies were run on alternate nights, and Giuglini, Tietjens, Mme Lemaire and Sig. Vialetti in Il trovatore were alternated with George Alexander Macfarren's Robin Hood, starring Helen Lemmens-Sherrington (her début), John Sims Reeves and Charles Santley. But the management partnership split, and Mapleson again dealt with Lumley to obtain Giuglini and Tietjens for a new project at the Lyceum Theatre.

== Mapleson's Lyceum season, 1861 ==
Meanwhile, Mapleson had also recruited Adelina Patti, but she was immediately poached by Gye for Covent Garden. The Lyceum company opened on 8 June 1861 with Il trovatore with Giuglini, Tietjens, Alboni, Enrico Delle Sedie (who had sung with Giuglini in Milan) and Édouard Gassier, under Luigi Arditi. The second night was Lucrezia Borgia, with the same cast, Tietjens' greatest role. Soon afterwards Giuglini led a cast in the very successful first London production of Un ballo in maschera, just beating Covent Garden to it, after all-night rehearsals for weeks through productions of Les Huguenots, Lucrezia Borgia and Norma (Giuglini as Pollione, opposite Tietjens), all with Arditi conducting. The end of the season was crowned with an evening of excerpts, in which Giuglini and Tietjens sang the grand duet from Les Huguenots.

== Her Majesty's, and a Cantata ==
In 1862, Mapleson finally obtained the lease of Her Majesty's Theatre, with the continued services of Tietjens and Giuglini. Verdi's Cantata, rejected for the opening of the 1862 London Exhibition, was performed, and productions of Semiramide, Oberon, Robert le Diable, Lucrezia Borgia and Il trovatore followed. During this season, Giuglini began to be difficult, spending much time in Brighton with a notorious lady, but being brought to heel by the threat of being replaced as Manrico. He however made it a condition of his continued service, that Mapleson should present a new Cantata which he, Giuglini, had written, including a lugubrious role for Tietjens, and a scene in which no fewer than 120 windows should appear in a stage set, from each of which at a given signal (i.e., the Garibaldi hymn) an Italian flag should appear. Mapleson complied: the cantata was performed for one night only. The 1862 season also included Giuglini in the opera Martha.

Following an incident in which Mme Tietjens accidentally struck Giuglini on the nose with a drumstick when sounding a gong during a performance of Norma, causing the tenor's nose to bleed on stage, Giuglini conceived a hatred for that opera and swore a solemn oath never to appear in it again. However, during a breakdown in a series of Il trovatore, owing to the indisposition of the contralto, Mapleson was obliged to stage Norma and engaged another tenor, knowing Giuglini's objection, and that this performance was supernumerary to his contract. Having attempted to extort additional fees, Giuglini, at the last minute, had the rival forcibly divested of his costume backstage, and sang the role himself, but to little financial advantage, and without the drumstick.

The 1863 season opened with Il trovatore, and in May was the premiere of Schira's opera Niccolo de' Lapi with Giuglini as Lamberto, Tietjens, Zélia Trebelli and Santley. However, the highlight of that season was the first London Faust, launched 11 June at Her Majesty's, in which he took the title role: the opera was thereafter produced at Covent Garden in every year until 1911. The premiere was with Tietjens (Margherita), Trebelli (Siebel), Edouard Gassier (Mephistopheles) and Charles Santley (Valentin), Arditi conducting. (On one occasion, Giuglini was hissed for a late appearance in the church scene.) It was given for ten nights in succession, after which Gye opened it at Covent Garden on July 2 with Enrico Tamberlik, and with Mario in the following year. In later productions, Mapleson replaced Giuglini in the role with the tenor Alessandro Bettini, and with Sims Reeves. Giuglini again sang The Bohemian Girl, this time with Santley, Vialetti and Louisa Pyne.

In 1864, Tietjens and Giuglini performed Lucrezia Borgia at Her Majesty's, in the gala performance in the presence of Garibaldi, and surpassed themselves. They led the cast in a new production of The Merry Wives of Windsor of Nicolai (as Mistress Ford and Fenton), with Bettini, Gassier, Santley and Caroline Bettelheim, which ran for many nights. Both appeared in Buckingham Palace concerts in that year. Giuglini was also Vincenzo in Gounod's Mireille, in a fight scene of which, owing to insufficient rehearsal, he received a resounding blow on the head from Santley, playing Ourrias.

== At St Petersburg ==
Late in 1864, Giuglini accepted an engagement for a season in St Petersburg, but arrived to find that he was not required for Faust as Enrico Tamberlik had contrived to take that role. His debut as Faust there was, therefore, delayed, and when he was finally asked, Patti (the Marguerite) was rumoured to be indisposed, to be replaced by a débutante. Giuglini was unnerved and became indisposed himself. When, at the end of his contract, a sum was deducted for that evening because he had taken a walk and left his house on that night, he threw his payment into a stove in fury, and thereafter his reason began to desert him. He returned to London in spring 1865, where Mapleson awaited him for a Dublin tour. All his valuable clothes and fur coats had been stolen in the journey back from Russia, and all the precious stones removed from his property and jewellery.

== Illness and death ==
At home in Welbeck Street, Giuglini sat eating oysters and refused to put on his trousers. Mapleson placed him in the care of a doctor at Chiswick, and in a later visit, with Tietjens, the tenor seemed rational, and sang 'Spirito gentil' and M'appari' for them divinely. His condition deteriorated, and having made a sea voyage to Italy that autumn for his health, he died at Pesaro.

== Character ==
According to Mapleson, Giuglini had a childlike and sometimes mischievous nature. He was often prey to unscrupulous young women who used their charms to play on his sensitive nature to bring him under their influence. In this he was protected by his manager Mme Puzzi ('Mamma Puzzi' as he called her), who was frequently summoned by letter or telegraph to rescue him at a moment's notice, and never failed to do so. Giuglini was very fond of flying kites, which he often did in the Brompton Road at the risk of being crushed to death by passing omnibuses, and became known to the drivers who indulgently avoided him.

Lumley noted one of Giuglini's obsessions in 1857: "At this period the principal passion of the great tenor was for making and letting off fireworks! It was one of those passions which almost amounted to a mania, and engrossed all his thoughts when not occupied with his art. He had come to be a considerable adept in firework-making..." Mme Tietjens told of a hazardous journey with him back from a performance in the theatre at Dublin, in a cab stuffed full of fireworks, with excited but unaware fellow travellers smoking pipes and cigars around them. Giuglini himself was a cigar-smoker and enjoyed gossip and conspiracy among his companions.

According to a story published in 1951 purporting to be based on historical reality, from around 1858 to 1863 Giuglini openly maintained a relationship with a married woman, Mrs Agnes Windham (formerly Agnes Willoughby), wife of 'Mad' Windham of Felbrigg Hall in Norfolk, which caused a frisson of public scandal. Mrs Windham was very attached to Giuglini and set up house with him in London, despite the fact that her husband appeared from time to time to create embarrassing scenes and threatened her with divorce.

== A critique ==
Santley, who had admired him in Milan, felt afterwards that he was not so fine a singer as Italo Gardoni, the tenor who succeeded him in London.

I never could understand why Gardoni should be comparatively forgotten, and Giuglini quoted as one of the great artists who have lived... Giuglini's voice was throaty... he was an awkward, ungainly man, and no actor at all.. he could not execute a rapid passage of four notes. What I conceive established him as a great favourite was a lackadaisickal sentimentality which the public, especially the British public, accepts for poetic sentiment. Withal, Giuglini was the last of his race; there has been no tenor on the Italian stage since who has been able to fill the place he left vacant.

Santley also wrote:

He was a great loss, and as a singer he has never been replaced; he was the last tenor who appeared in England of the real Italian school. There have been more powerful lungs, and more energetic limbs, but not one of the tenors who succeeded him could compare with him as a singer; his phrasing was perfect, which everyone who heard him in 'I Puritani', 'Faust', 'Lucrezia Borgia', and many other operas, will readily admit.

In 1893, George Bernard Shaw could still write of his own time as the 'post-Giuglinian days'; and Giuglini's name was often coupled with that of the great tenor Mario.

== Sources ==
- J.H. Mapleson, The Mapleson Memoirs, 2 vols (Chicago: Belford, Clarke & Co, 1888).
- H. Rosenthal and J. Warrack, Concise Oxford Dictionary of Opera (London: OUP, 1974 printing).
- C. Santley, Student and Singer - The Reminiscences of Charles Santley (London: Edward Arnold, 1892).
- C. Santley, Reminiscences of my Life (London: Isaac Pitman, 1909).
- G.B. Shaw, Music in London 1890-1894, 3 vols (London: Constable,1932).
- J. Sims Reeves, The Life of Sims Reeves written by himself (London: Simpkin Marshall, 1888).
