= Italo Gardoni =

Italian opera singer (1821–1882)

Italo Gardoni in 1874

Italo Gardoni (12 March 1821 – 26 March 1882) was a leading operatic tenore di grazia singer from Italy who enjoyed a major international career during the middle decades of the 19th century. Along with Giovanni Mario, Gaetano Fraschini, Enrico Tamberlik and Antonio Giuglini, he was one of the most celebrated Italian tenors of his era.

His voice was noted as being pure toned and sweet, lacking any vibrato. He was able to sing legato passages smoothly, but was also known for his vocal flair and agility.

== Career ==
Born in Parma, Gardoni studied with Antonio De Cesari (1797–1853). He made his debut as Roberto Devereux (Donizetti) in Viadana in 1840, and over the following 7 years made his career in France, Italy and Germany. In Paris in December 1844 he was Bothwell in the Paris première of Louis Niedermeyer's opera Marie Stuart at the Théâtre de l'Académie Royale de Musique opposite the soprano Rosine Stoltz, and was with her again there for the premiere of Michael Balfe's L'étoile de Seville in the following year. Gardoni knew and worked with Balfe, who composed items particularly for him. The limpidity and clarity of his voice, and his ravishing upper notes (no less than his youth, charm and elegance) were greatly admired in Paris: and if he was not ready for all the roles from the repertoires of Adolphe Nourrit and Gilbert Duprez, still (they thought) some Meyerbeer would have suited him well, not least Raoul in Les Huguenots. Gardoni continued to sing in Paris throughout his career.

=== England: Her Majesty's Theatre 1847–1852 ===
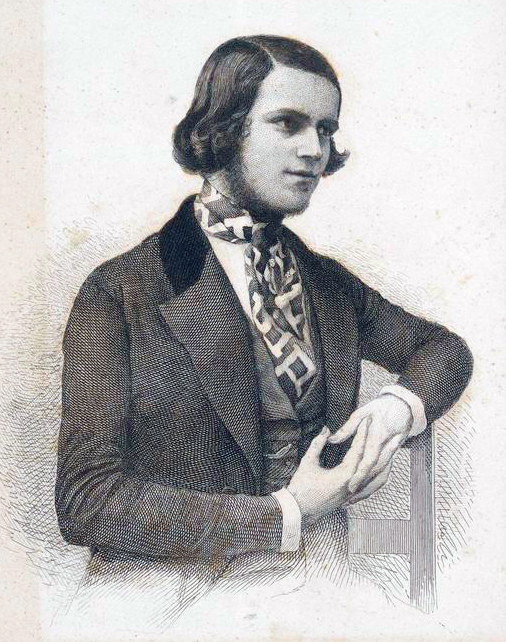
Gardoni as a young man

In 1847 he went to London, where he performed regularly until 1874. Sought by rival impresarios in France and Italy, he was purchased from the Paris Opéra for Her Majesty's Theatre by Benjamin Lumley for 60,000 Francs, to compensate his public for the departure from their stage of Mario. Having been introduced through the Puzzi salon in Jermyn Street, his first London stage appearance was in February 1847 in La favorita with Mme Sanchioli: both his principal arias were encored with much enthusiasm for his vocal purity of taste and feeling. His histrionic powers were faultless, except that he lacked the force to portray bursts of passion.

There followed La sonnambula with Mme Castellan (the dramatic soprano who also partnered Lumley's tenore robusto Gaetano Fraschini), and I puritani and L'elisir d'amore (with Castellan and Luigi Lablache), and he rapidly became a great favourite. Gardoni took a minor role in Jenny Lind's London debut in Robert le diable, with Josef Staudigl, Fraschini, Castellan and others, in the presence of Queen Victoria: he partnered Lind in La sonnambula (and La figlia del reggimento?) soon afterwards. On 22 July 1847 he created the tenor role in Verdi's I masnadieri opposite Lind, Lablache and Filippo Coletti, the first two nights being under the composer's baton, and thereafter under Balfe's. At the salon of Henry Greville he was associated with Mario, Grisi, Pinsuti and others.

In the 1848 season he was Lumley's leading tenor. Il barbiere di Siviglia with Sophie Cruvelli and Belletti was followed by the London premiere of Verdi's Attila, with Cruvelli, Velletti and Cuzzani. He sang Gennaro to Cruvelli's Lucrezia Borgia. Sims Reeves, then attempting to establish his own place on the Italian dramatic stage in London, agreed with Lumley to appear in the lesser role of Carlo in Linda di Chamounix (supporting Eugenia Tadolini) in the hope of playing Edgardo in Lucia di Lammermoor, Percy in Anna Bolena and Arturo in I puritani, which were billed for the (sensational) return of Jenny Lind. But Gardoni was cast as Edgardo, and Reeves severed his engagements. There was a cry of 'Sims Reeves' from the gallery as Gardoni sang Edgardo's first cavatina on the opening night. The situation probably arose through Lind expressing a preference for Gardoni as her partner: obligingly he also stepped in as Carlo. Gardoni now sang Roberto for Lind, but was thought not up to the part. But at her final performance at Her Majesty's, in Robert le diable on 10 May 1849 (before a royal and distinguished audience), Gardoni led Jenny Lind onto the stage to receive her rapturous applause.

After a winter season in St Petersburg, in 1850 he reappeared with Parodi and Frezzolini in a revival of I Capuleti e i Montecchi (as Tebaldo), and pleased his audience by disproving a false report of his death. June 1850 saw a première of Halévy's La tempesta in which as Fernando he partnered Sontag's Miranda, Carlotta Grisi's Ariel, Colini's Prospero and the celebrated impersonation of Caliban by Lablache, directed by Balfe.

Gardoni and the star contralto Marietta Alboni were the lead soloists, in the presence of Queen Isabella II, in the 1850 inaugural performance of La favorita at the Teatro Real in Madrid.

1851 renewed Gardoni's Gennaro in Lucrezia Borgia. A novelty première, Giulio Alary's Le tre nozze, with Henriette Sontag and Lablache, preceded the more significant L'enfant prodigue of Auber with Sontag, Massol and Coletti. He was with Cruvelli again for a special performance of Balfe's opera I quattro figli. When Reeves and Cruvelli sang Fidelio in 1851, Gardoni led the hand-picked soloists forming the chorus of prisoners on the first night. In Lumley's operatic concerts, also, Reeves, Gardoni and Calzolari formed a 'three tenors' trio for Curschmann's Evviva Baccho, and took part in a triplicated version of Martini's trio Don't tickle me, I pray with Henriette Sontag, Sophie Cruvelli and Jenny Duprez as soprani, and three bassi including Lablache. He continued to sing for Lumley through his crisis months of early 1852, and gave a Norma with Cruvelli and Lablache: but after Cruvelli's defection he, too, slipped away from Lumley's Company. In 1852 he was with Reeves, Pauline Viardot-Garcia, Louisa Pyne, Charlotte Sainton-Dolby and Karl Formes in first oratorio performances of Dr Bexfield's Israel Restored and Hugh Pearson's Jerusalem at the Norwich Festival.

=== England 1854–1872 ===
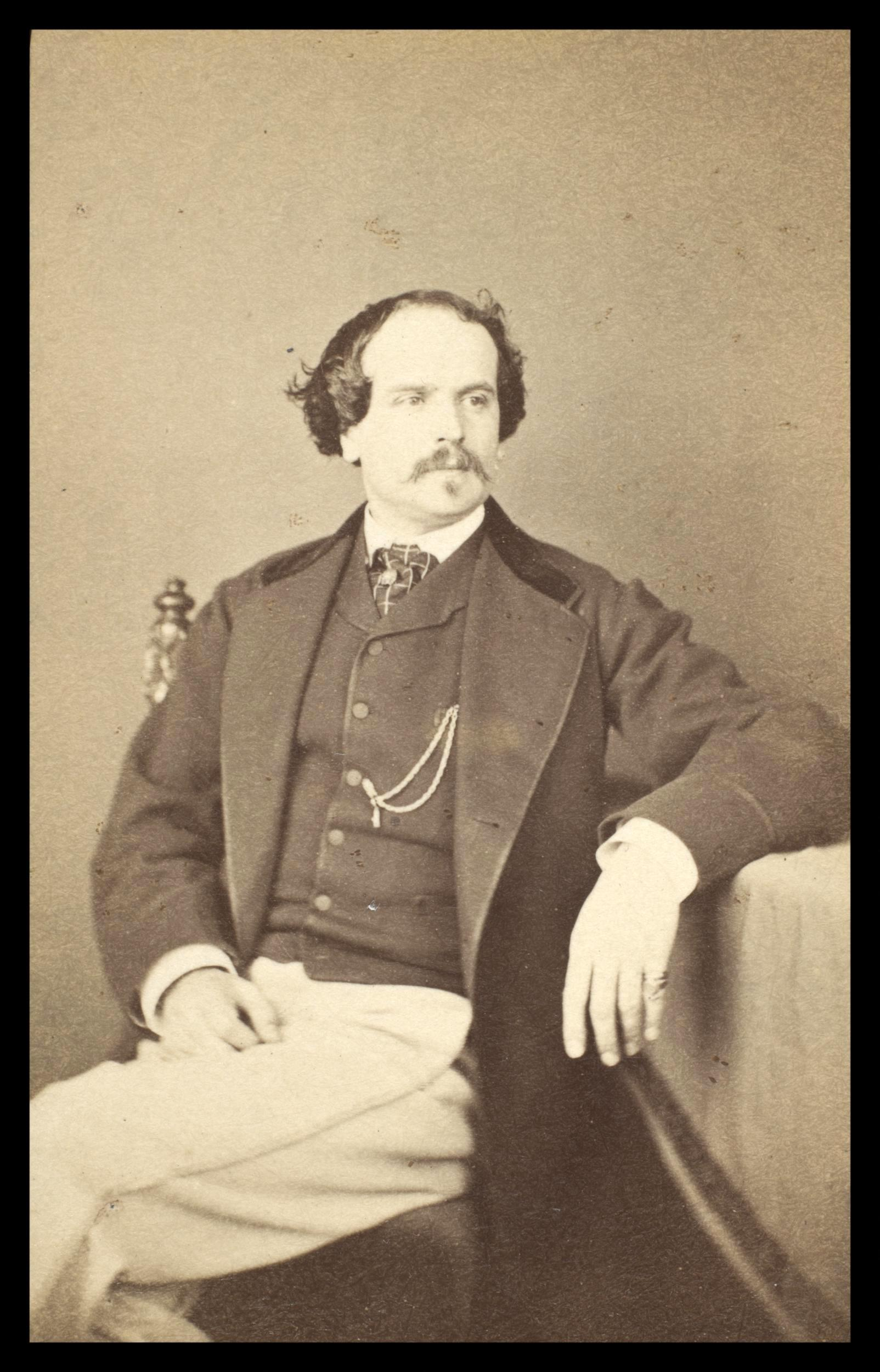
Italo Gardoni c. 1860

In 1855, when Michael Costa produced his oratorio Eli in the Birmingham Festival, with Viardot, Castellan, Reeves and Formes, Gardoni was in the audience with Mario and Enrico Tamberlik, and afterwards they went in a group to pay Reeves a large compliment. Gardoni himself appeared in Rossini's opera Il conte Ory with Constance Nantier-Didiée and Angiolina Bosio, an 'exquisite' combination of voices. In 1857 he participated in the second Lyceum season (while the new Covent Garden theatre was awaited). H. F. Chorley praised his performance of Auber's Fra Diavolo, with Angiolina Bosio, Mlle Marai, Giorgio Ronconi and Pietro Neri-Baraldi, with Joseph Tagliafico and Charles Zelger as the Brigands.

During the later 1850s Gardoni appeared often at Covent Garden, including performances of Alfredo in La traviata for Michael Costa in 1858 and 1859. After Meyerbeer had re-drafted his Ein Feldlager in Schlesien for Paris as L'étoile du nord (1854), an Italian version was presented for the British premiere, at Covent Garden. For this, Meyerbeer added the Act 1 polonaise and the romanza Disperso il crin sul mesto sen for Gardoni in the role of Danilowitz. Gardoni also took the role of Corentin in the British premiere of Meyerbeer's Dinorah (Le pardon), at Covent Garden, in 1859, in which Chorley praised his 'peasant poltroonery'.

In autumn 1864, when the mentally unstable rival tenor Antonio Giuglini took up his doomed St Petersburg engagement, Gardoni joined Mapleson's autumn operatic touring party as principal tenor. (Gardoni had been one of Mapleson's vocal instructors.) Charles Santley called him

'a fine singer, and a much better actor than he generally had credit for. He was a very good Faust and Sir Huon, though the music of the latter did not suit him. In Mireille he was excellent... His voice was pure: he was a handsome man, and in parts which suited him an excellent actor. (He) could sing any kind of music, cantabile or florid.' Santley thought him in many ways the superior of Guiglini.

His 1865 Faust was with Thérèse Tietjens, Zélia Trebelli, Junca and Santley. In the 1866 season at Her Majesty's, he sang Pilade in a magnificent staging of Gluck's Iphigénie en Tauride, opposite Tietjens (Iphigenia), Santley (Oreste) and Édouard Gassier (Thoas) – in which the soloists 'surpassed themselves': also he renewed his Corentin (Dinorah), with Ilma de Murska and Santley (Hoel), greatly to Mapleson's satisfaction. In 1867 he was Ottavio in the Don Giovanni with Christina Nilsson, Tietjens, Sinico, Gassier (the Don) and Santley (Leporello), and his Corentino was repeated.

Gardoni remained with Mapleson, and in Robert le Diable in 1872 he was Rambaldo to Christine Nilsson's Alice, Pietro Mongini's Roberto, Signor Foli's Bertramo and de Murska's Isabella

=== France ===
In March 1864 Gardoni was a soloist in the first performance of Rossini's Petite messe solennelle, with Carlotta and Barbara Marchisio and Luigi Agnesi (Louis Agniez).

Gardoni married the daughter of baritone Antonio Tamburini and (his wife) the soprano Marietta Goja. He died in Paris.

== Vocal character ==
In 1869 Gardoni published a set of vocal exercises under the title:

- 15 Vocalises calculés sur la formation du style moderne et le perfectionnement de l'art du Chant, av. Pfte. (Mainz, Schott) (4 Fl. 12 Xr.)

The old entry from the Dictionary of Music and Musicians called him a 'tenore di grazia':

'Italo Gardoni possessed what might be called only a moderate voice, but so well, so easily and naturally produced, that it was heard almost to the same advantage in a theatre as in a room. This was especially noticeable when he sang the part of Florestan, in Fidelio, at Covent Garden, after an absence of some duration from the stage. The unaffected grace of his style rendered him as perfect a model for vocal artists as could well be found.
