= Thérèse Tietjens =

German opera singer

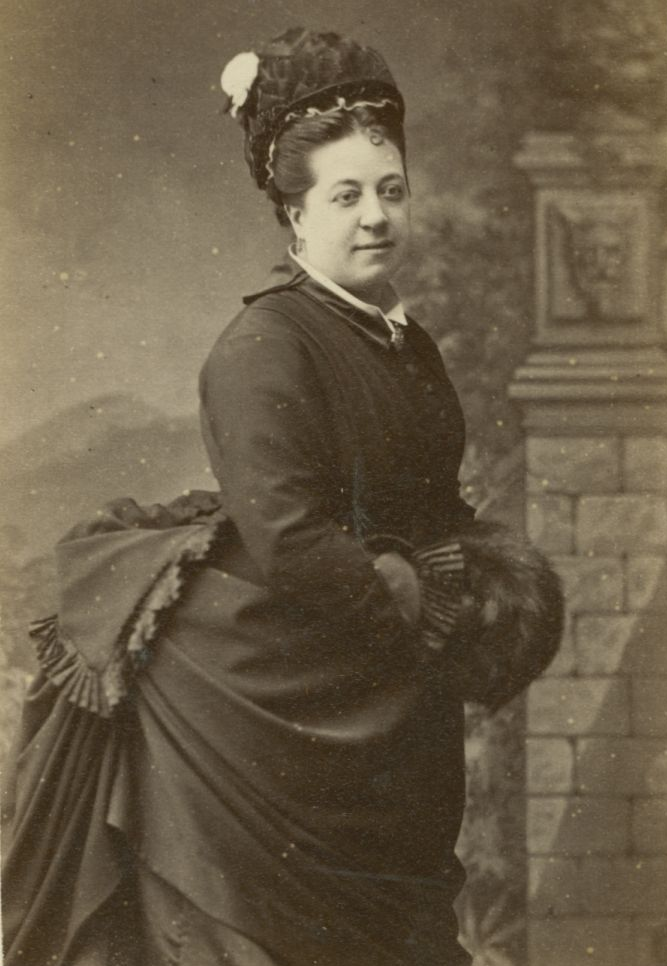
- Born: 17 July 1831; Hamburg
- Died: 3 October 1877 (aged 46); London

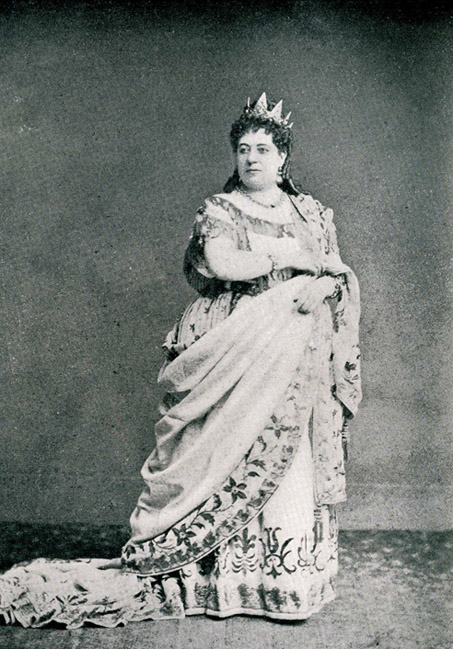
Tietjens as Lucrezia Borgia

Thérèse Carolina Johanne Alexandra Tietjens (17 July 1831, Hamburg – 3 October 1877, London) was a leading opera and oratorio soprano. She made her career chiefly in London during the 1860s and 1870s, but her sequence of musical triumphs in the British capital was terminated by cancer.

During her prime, her powerful yet agile voice was said to span seamlessly a range of three octaves. Many opera historians consider her to have been the finest dramatic soprano of the second half of the 19th century.

== Hamburg, Vienna, Frankfurt ==
She was of German birth but, according to some sources, Hungarian extraction. Tietjens received her vocal training in Hamburg and in Vienna. She studied with Heinrich Proch, who was also the teacher of Mme Peschka-Leutner and other prime donne. She made a successful debut at Hamburg in 1849 as Lucrezia Borgia in Donizetti's opera, a work with which she was particularly associated all her professional life. She sang in Frankfurt from 1850 to 1856 and in Vienna from 1856–1859.

== London (1858–1864) ==
Tietjens made her first appearance in London in 1858, as Valentine in Les Huguenots. England thereafter became her home, and she continued to sing opera regularly at Her Majesty's Theatre, the Drury Lane and Covent Garden until her untimely death in 1877.

She was equally fine in oratorio, and became a leading dramatic soprano in England, during the 1860s and early 1870s on both stage and platform. The early part of her London career coincided with the heyday of the tenor Antonio Giuglini (1827–1865), a student of Cellini, who made his debut at Her Majesty's in 1857 as Fernando in La Favorita. In July 1859, Tietjens created the first London Elena in Les vêpres siciliennes of Verdi (four years after the original Paris production) at Drury Lane, opposite Giuglini's Arrigo.

At this time the soprano Giulia Grisi was still singing in London: Tietjens was to inherit parts of Grisi's London repertoire and of that of Giuditta Pasta. In 1860, Edward Tyrrel Smith, manager of Her Majesty's, attempted to seize the market in both English and Italian opera by having two companies alternating. The Italian opera began with Il trovatore, with Tietjens, Mme Lemaire, Giuglini and the baritone Vialetti, and the team then progressed to Don Giovanni, while the English opera premiered George Alexander Macfarren's Robin Hood with Sims Reeves. On 15 June 1861, Tietjens was the first London Amelia, opposite Giuglini's Riccardo, and the Renato of Enrico Delle Sedie (a singer of great style, musicianship and talent but limited vocal range) in the original Lyceum Un ballo in maschera for Mapleson.

In her ideal role as Lucrezia, Tietjens led the cast at the London debut of Zelia Trebelli (singing Orsini) in 1862. In that year Herman Klein, aged 15, saw her in Les Huguenots and, 40 years later, described his realisation then, that she was a tragedienne of the highest order. Moreover, his teacher had described her delivery of Handel's "I know that my Redeemer liveth" to him in terms of wonder. On 14 July 1862 at the 50th Jubilee concert for the Philharmonic Society, she sang the Mendelssohn Loreley (with choir) and "With joy the impatient husbandman" from Haydn's The Seasons. This was at St James's Hall Piccadilly, conducted by William Sterndale Bennett: other soloists were the baritone Charles Santley, soprano Jenny Lind, violinist Joseph Joachim, pianist Lucy Anderson and the cellist Carlo Alfredo Piatti.

The year 1863 saw the first performance of Gounod's Faust in England, at London's Her Majesty's Theatre, with Tietjens as Marguerite, Giuglini (as Faust), Charles Santley (as Valentin), Edouard Gassier (as Mephistopheles) and Trebelli (as Siebel). This production was transferred to the theatre at Covent Garden and was performed in every successive season until 1911. In the same season Tietjens created the role of Selvaggia in Niccolo de' Lapi by Francesco Schira (conductor at Drury Lane), also with Trebelli, Giuglini and Santley (Niccolo). (This work was revived with far greater success as Selvaggia in Milan 1875.) There was more Il trovatore, a Norma (one of Tietjens's finest roles) with Désirée Artôt (making her debut that year also as Violetta and Marie) (mezzo) as Adalgisa, and Weber's Oberon with Sims Reeves (Huon), Marietta Alboni (Fatima), Trebelli (Puck), the tenor Alessandro Bettini (Oberon), Gassier (Babekan) and Santley (Scherasmin). That autumn she went with the Mapleson tour to Dublin to appear in Faust with Reeves, Trebelli and Santley, and for herself also made a tour in Paris. In 1867 he was a soloist in the premiere of the Sacred Cantata Woman of Samaria by William Sterndale Bennett at the 1867 Birmingham Music Festival conducted by the composer.

Otto Nicolai's 1849 opera The Merry Wives of Windsor had its English premiere in May 1864 with Tietjens and Caroline Bettelheim as the wives, Gassier (Page) and Santley the husbands, Junca (who also replaced Gassier in Faust) as Falstaff, Giuglini as Fenton, Giuseppina Vitali (Anne), Manfredi (Slender) and Mazzetti (Dr Caius). Santley describes the fun he and Tietjens had in the scene turning out the linen basket and pelting each other with linen.

Tietjens, Santley, Giuglini, Mayerhofer and Pauline Lucca gave a Buckingham Palace concert before Queen Victoria in May 1864: Tietjens was then singing Gluck (Armide), Bellini (I puritani), Rossini and Meyerbeer (Robert le diable). On 5 July 1864 Titiens created Mireille (opposite Giuglini's Vincent) in the first production in England of Gounod's opera, which in its original five-act form had been premiered in Paris in March. Léon Carvalho, Director of the Opéra-Comique, Paris, and his brother-in-law Miolon personally supervised the later rehearsals. Santley thought this role didn't suit her. The 1864 production of Beethoven's Fidelio, however, more fully established Tietjens as a London successor in the repertoire of Wilhelmine Schröder-Devrient.

== London (1865–1868) ==
Early in 1865 Giuglini retired from the stage, showing signs of insanity. He returned to Italy and died there in October. His replacement (Santley thought, an improvement) was Italo Gardoni, who had created the tenor role in I masnadieri in 1847 in London with Jenny Lind and Luigi Lablache. On 6 June 1865 Tietjens lead the cast in the first performance in England of Cherubini's 1797 opera Médée, a new version with recitatives by Luigi Arditi. Later that year she toured in Manchester with Santley in Don Giovanni, and in October in London they appeared together in Weber's Der Freischütz.

In 1866, she assisted at the unsuccessful return of Giulia Grisi in Norma and Don Giovanni: her own appearances were however very successful, not least as Iphigenie in Gluck's Iphigénie en Tauride, with Gardoni (Pilade), Santley (Oreste) and Gassier (Thoas). Two private performances were given for the Earl of Dudley, supported by Sims Reeves, the baritone Giovanni Battista Belletti, and Santley. The same season saw her Elvira in an Ernani revival with Tasca, Gassier and Santley, and an Il Seraglio with Mme Sinico, and Messrs Gunz, a new tenor Rokitanski, and the Irish bass Signor Foli.

In 1867, the tenor Pietro Mongini took the role of Alvaro opposite Santley's Vargas and Tietjens's Leonora in the first England La forza del destino (Verdi) on 22 June, with Gassier as Fra Melitone. At this time the illustrious Swedish soprano Christine Nilsson also became a regular performer at Her Majesty's, and there was a Don Giovanni with Tietjens and Nilsson, Mme Sinico, Gardoni and Rokitanski.

The newspaper critic Herman Klein heard her in rehearsal at the 1868 Norwich Festival. He later remarked that then her voice was still fresh, powerful and penetrating, with the curiously dramatic 'human' quality that was perhaps its most notable attribute. Her style was marked by the same rare individuality, and her phrasing a curious blend of vigour and grace. She used portamento in approaching a high note from below, a technique often thought ugly, but in her a natural and artistic effect, for she was quite capable of entering a note with superb attack if she wished. Her magnificent energy and purity of tone was especially evident in the opening bars of the 'Inflammatus' in Rossini's Stabat Mater, and in 'Let the bright Seraphim'.

== Later career ==
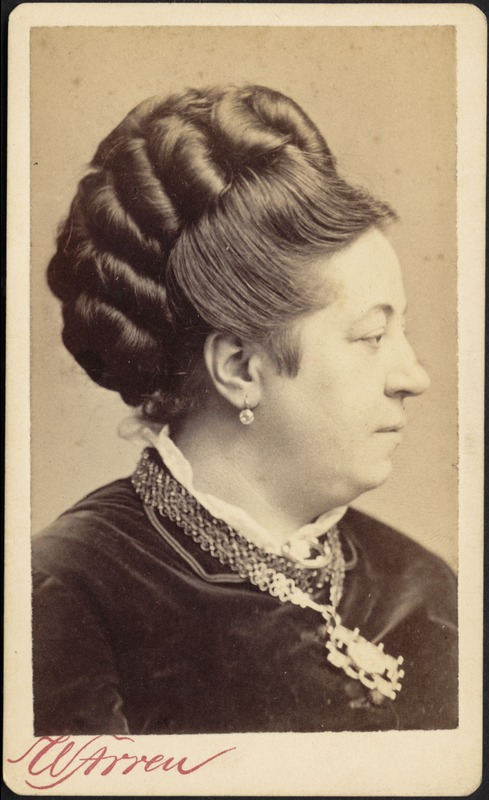
Tietjens carte de visite

Tietjens sang again for the Royal Philharmonic Society in 1868. In the following year, when there was an attempt to form a union of the Her Majesty's and Covent Garden companies, the Italian season opened with Norma, Tietjens in the title role, with Sinico, Mongini and Foli. She also sang with Reeves and Santley in the premiere of Arthur Sullivan's The Prodigal Son in 1869. In 1870 Gassier retired (he died in 1872). The English première of Rossini's Messe Solennelle occurred with Tietjens, Sofia Scalchi, Mongini and Santley: and in 1871, Mme Tietjens was awarded the Gold Medal of the Philharmonic Society. In this first year of the award ten medals were given, and thereafter seldom more than one in any one year.

When the Gye and Mapleson companies were successfully merged, in 1871, Tietjens was the one principal artist not re-engaged by George Wood. However, Lucrezia had remained a staple of her repertoire throughout the 1860s, and in May 1872 she again led a cast, on this occasion at Drury Lane, for the London debut of the tenor Italo Campanini (as Gennaro), with Trebelli as Orsino and the French baritone Jean-Baptiste Faure as Alfonso, under the baton of Sir Michael Costa. She also took the solos in Sullivan's Festival Te Deum at The Crystal Palace.

Campanini was at once (but rather prematurely) acclaimed as the successor of Mario and Giuglini. But in the next years, it was with Campanini as Lohengrin, for Mapleson at Her Majesty's, that Tietjens attempted her only Wagnerian role, Ortrud; and in June 1874, in company with Christine Nilsson and Campanini, she created a lead in the posthumous first production of Michael Balfe's Il Talismano. A minor role in that production was created by a young baritone Giovanni de Reschi, who in the same year made his English debuts at Drury Lane in La favorita (Alfonso), as Don Giovanni, as Valentine (Faust), and as Count Almaviva. Returning to his vocal studies, he reappeared in Paris as a tenor in 1884, and became known to the world as Jean de Reszke.

Until 1872, she and "Madame Rudersdorff" had been the joint 'queens' of the English oratorio platform, but in that year her friend and rival left to continue her career in the United States. Tietjens then reigned alone. In 1876, however, she visited North America, among other things performing the part of Lucrezia Borgia at the Astor Opera House in New York City opposite the tenor Pasquale Brignoli. This was to prove the last major episode in her extraordinary career. Her great roles had been Lucrezia, Leonora, Norma, Medea, and Donna Anna. In addition to other parts mentioned, she sang Fides in Le prophète and the eponymous lead in Semiramide. The great Adelina Patti (to lyric sopranos what Tietjens was to the dramatic variety) would refrain from adding Semiramide to her own repertoire until after the death of Tietjens, out of respect for her immense distinction in the role.

== Illness, farewell and death ==
Late in her life Mme Tietjens developed cancer, which caused her much pain, and she died at the age of 46. By this stage, she had become a sort of British institution, and under Sir Michael Costa she sang many performances of Handel's Messiah and Mendelssohn's Elijah—both works dear to the taste of London concert-goers. She also put on a great deal of weight. In 1920, veteran American baritone David Bispham could recall her appearance but not her voice. Shaw, in 1892, remembered how her performances of Lucrezia, of Semiramide, Valentine, Pamina and her Countess had established a sort of belief that all these characters must have been extremely overweight. She had become loved for her private virtues as much as for her artistic gifts.

Herman Klein, who always retained his high opinion of Tietjens and her art, attended her last performance. It was Lucrezia at Her Majesty's on 19 May 1877. She had known for some time that her body harboured a malignant growth, and she gave this performance prior to undergoing a surgical procedure designed to ease her affliction. She was really too ill to go on, but insisted. After each of the acts she fainted and had to be resuscitated, but while on stage showed no sign of her physical suffering, and only a few in the audience knew her condition. Her final scream, as Lucrezia realises that Gennaro is dead, sent a shudder through the house, and she did not shirk the painful fall to the stage at the close. The curtain rose twice to the applause, but she was again unconscious and lay motionless. The operation went ahead as planned but it was to no avail: she died in London on 3 October 1877. She was buried in Kensal Green Cemetery "in the presence of a vast crowd, amid tokens of public grief such as no foreign artist before her had ever been vouchsafed on English soil."

Among her achievements, she had introduced London to Gounod's Faust and Mireille, Verdi's Un ballo in maschera, Les vêpres siciliennes and La forza del destino, and Nicolai's Die lustigen Weiber von Windsor, while maintaining for almost 20 years a repertoire that also embraced Oberon, Der Freischütz, Fidelio, Médée, Die Zauberflöte, Il Seraglio, The Marriage of Figaro and, of course, her signature part of Lucrezia Borgia — and many other roles as well.

== Assessments ==
According to the Encyclopædia Britannica Eleventh Edition, "[h]er voice was a dramatic soprano of magnificent quality, and her powers as an actress were supreme." "The great volume and purity of her voice and her sympathetic and dignified acting combined to make her famous in strong dramatic parts." Michael Scott suggests that Emma Albani attempted, unsuccessfully, to 'inherit the mantle' of Tietjens, but that Lillian Nordica and Lilli Lehmann (both of whom can be heard on recordings made in the early 1900s) were more natural successors to her vocal tradition.

== Sources ==
- R. Elkin, Royal Philharmonic, The Annals of the Royal Philharmonic Society (Rider, London 1946).
- G. T. Ferris, Great Singers: Malibran to Titiens (D. Appleton & Co, New York 1881).
- H. Klein, 30 Years of Musical Life in London, 1870–1900 (Century, New York 1903).
- J. Sims Reeves, Sims Reeves, his Life and Recollections (Simpkin Marshall, London 1888).
- H. Rosenthal & J. Warrack, A Concise Oxford Dictionary of Opera (London, 1974 printing).
- C. Santley, Student and Singer, the Reminiscences of Charles Santley (London, Edward Arnold 1892).
- M. Scott, The Record of Singing to 1914 (Duckworth 1977).
- G. B. Shaw, Music in London 1890–1894 (3 Vols) (Constable, London 1932).
- S. Timms, Titiens – Her Majesty's prima Donna: Victorian London's Opera Idol Therese Titiens (Bezazzy Publishing UK 2005). ISBN 0-9550667-0-0
