= Allan James Foley =

Irish opera singer (1837–1899)

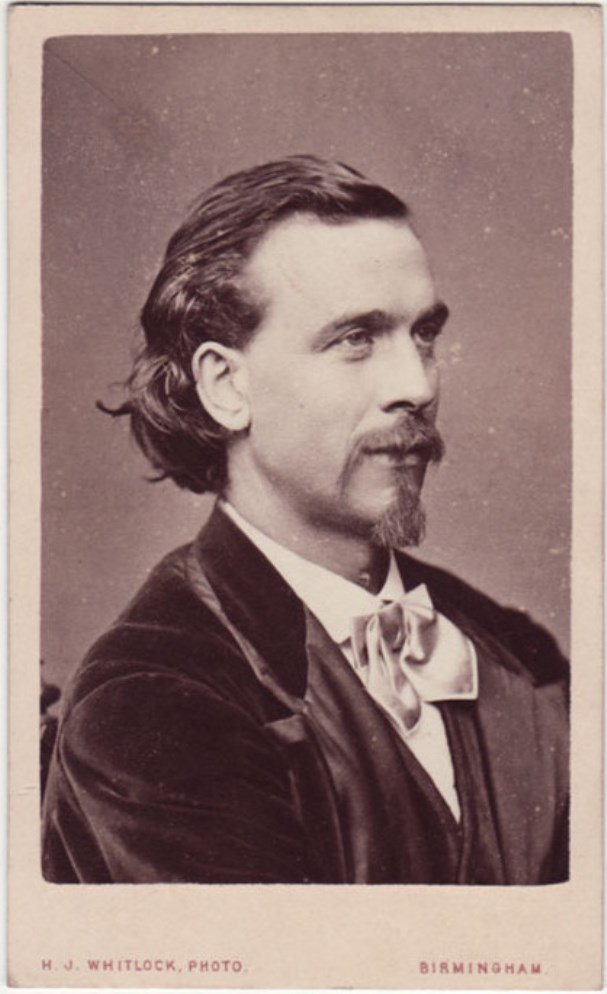
Allan James Foley

Allan James Foley (7 August 1837 – 10 October 1899), distinguished 19th century Irish bass opera singer, was born at Cahir, County Tipperary. In accordance with the prevailing preference for Italian artists, he changed the spelling (but not the pronunciation) of his name and was always known as 'Signor Foli.'

His family emigrated, and Foli spent much of his youth in Hartford, Connecticut. Originally a carpenter, he studied singing under Bisaccia at Naples and made his first appearance at Catania in 1862. From the Paris Opéra he was engaged by Mapleson for the season of 1865, and made his London debut as St Bris in Les Huguenots. In the absence of Antonio Giuglini the company toured in late 1865 with Mario as principal tenor in Manchester, Dublin, Belfast and Liverpool. In January–April 1866 Mapleson split the company into two parties for a very extensive British provincial tour, Foli joining the ensemble of Mario, Grisi and Lablache under Arditi.

== Opera, oratorio and concert ==
In that year of 1866 he was introduced at the Royal Philharmonic Society. Thereafter he appeared regularly as principal basso for Mapleson, with much success in various parts. In 1866 he appeared in a short run of Mozart’s Il Ratto del Seraglio (The Abduction from the Serrail) with Thérèse Tietjens, Hans von Rokitansky and Clarice Sinico: and in 1868 he was with Clara Louise Kellogg, Zélia Trebelli, Bettini and Charles Santley in La Gazza Ladra (Il Podestà). In 1869, the season in which the Gye and Mapleson resources were combined, Foli was in the opening production of Norma with Tietjens, Sinico and Mongini, and in the Rigoletto which followed it. He took the role of Daland in the first performance of The Flying Dutchman in England in 1870 with Santley as Vanderdecken and Ilma de Murska as Senta. Herman Klein mentions his Bertramo in the 1872 Drury Lane production of Robert le Diable with Christine Nilsson, Italo Gardoni, Mongini and de Murska. He was famous for his Sparafucile (Rigoletto) and Commendatore (Don Giovanni), and had a repertoire of some 60 operas.

Foli's career in concert and oratorio at the principal festivals developed alongside his operatic work, often with the same colleagues. In 1866 he appeared with Santley in a performance of Israel in Egypt given by the National Choral Society at the old St Martin's Hall. In February 1867 he scored a success in Haydn's The Creation with the Sacred Harmonic Society. Santley and Foli sang The Lord is a man of war in the Handel Festival of 1868. He took the role of Jacob in the first production of Macfarren's Joseph at the Leeds Festival, 21 September 1877, and Herod in that of L'Enfance du Christ of Berlioz under Charles Hallé in Manchester (30 December 1880) and London (26 February 1881). He sang in the first performance of Gounod's La Rédemption in 1882. In Sydney, Australia in May 1892 Foli had a great success with Haydn's The Creation but, in July, a failure with Mendelssohn's Elijah, for which he was suffering from a sore throat. During the 1890s, in his late fifties, he was singing Messiah in England in company with Adelina Patti, Emma Albani and Edward Lloyd.

He appeared in concert, oratorio and opera in various countries. He toured in Russia (Moscow and St Petersburg) in 1873, where he made a great success in Israel in Egypt and as Pietro in Auber's opera Masaniello. In Mapleson's first American tour in the autumn of 1878 he was in company with Etelka Gerster, Minnie Hauk, Zélia Trebelli, Italo Campanini and many others, and appeared in a particularly notable I Puritani with Gerster and Campanini at Chicago. He returned several times to America, was also heard in Vienna, and in the 1890s he toured in Australia and New Zealand, and in Canada. In addition to stage performance, through the 1870s Foli appeared regularly with leading singers in the Grand Operatic Concerts at the Royal Albert Hall. In 1877, with Santley, Nilsson and Ciro Pinsuti, assisted by Arthur Chappell, he gave a benefit concert which raised £1500 towards an annuity for their colleague Mario, who was then living in Rome in straitened circumstances. He was among the contributors at the Retirement Concert of Sims Reeves at the Royal Albert Hall on 11 May 1891, and sang in two concerts in the first Promenade season (1895), including the final concert, the benefit for Robert Newman.

In England he also appeared frequently at the Boosey Popular Concerts. Songs described in the tours of Australia and Canada give some idea of his recitals, such as Pinsuti's Bedouin Love Song, Formes's In Sheltered Vale, Battison Haynes's Off to Philadelphia, Schubert's The Wanderer, Loder's The Diver, Knight's Rock'd in the Cradle of the Deep, the 'Drinking' song In cellar cool, Gatty's True till Death, and stand-alone operatic pieces such as Qui sdegno non-s'accende (Mozart, Die Zauberflöte), She alone charmeth my sadness (Gounod, La reine de Saba) and O ruddier than the cherry (Handel, Acis and Galatea), all of which remained in the standard English concert repertoire well into the twentieth century, and were recorded by such singers as David Bispham, Peter Dawson, Robert Radford or Norman Allin. Foli's voice was powerful but of beautiful quality, its compass from the bass E to F above middle C. With his vigorous, straightforward delivery, he was a great favourite in London for many years. George Bernard Shaw referred to the certainty and spontaneity of his roulades.

== Recordings ==
Foli was one of the very earliest classical musicians to make a phonograph recording. He did this at The Crystal Palace in 1878, and the fact was described and reported in the press. A description drawn from The Daily Telegraph shows that at a private recording session at the Crystal Palace on Good Friday 1878, "both duets and solos were successfully tried by Madame Lemmens-Sherrington, M. Lemmens, Signor Foli, M. Manns and other skilled musicians." In another report of Foli's recordings, "... the accomplished vocalist, to test the powers of the phonograph, sang a verse of 'Jack's Yarn' into it. In a few seconds the ruby point was properly adjusted over the sheet of tinfoil, and the selection repeated as sung by the Signor, though, of course, in not so loud a tone (the sound issues from the machine as from a distance). Thereupon Signor Foli's friend purchased the sheet of tinfoil, with the remark that when he returned to New Jersey he would give the many friends of Signor Foli there a treat. He meant to put the tinfoil on an exactly similar phonograph at New Jersey, and have the song repeated. Whether the experiment succeeded has not yet transpired." The recording is not known to have survived, nor, probably, is any recording of him known.

== Character ==
In 1879 he appeared as witness at the Old Bailey, in a forgery case relating to authorship of a song, 'The Tar's Return', which had been written for Foli and sold to him for his public endorsement. He apparently possessed a frightening temper: the story is told of a disagreement with a head waiter in a well-known restaurant, in which Foli threw his dinner, plate and all, out of the window to make the point that the meal was unsatisfactory, shouting 'That's what's wrong with it, and now what are you going to do about it?' Amid the general laughter his anger soon evaporated. He is said to have been an inveterate gambler, and a successful one, and to have visited Monte Carlo annually.

Signor Foli died very suddenly in October 1899 at Southport, having gone to Liverpool to see off Miss Clara Butt, who was sailing for America on a tour. Having been a frequent and successful operator on the Stock Exchange, he left his wife Rosita and his brothers and his two sisters (who lived at Tacoma, Washington) well provided for. The estate led to a lawsuit.

Following his example, the great Irish tenor John McCormack (who married Lily Foley) took the stage name 'Giovanni Foli' for his Italian operatic début at Savona in 1906.
