= Henry Forbes =

Henry Forbes may refer to:

- Henry Ogg Forbes (1851–1932), Scottish explorer
- Henry Forbes (composer) (1804–1859), pianist and composer
- Henry Flavelle Forbes (1877–1959), British civil servant
