= Élise Masson =

French operatic mezzo-soprano

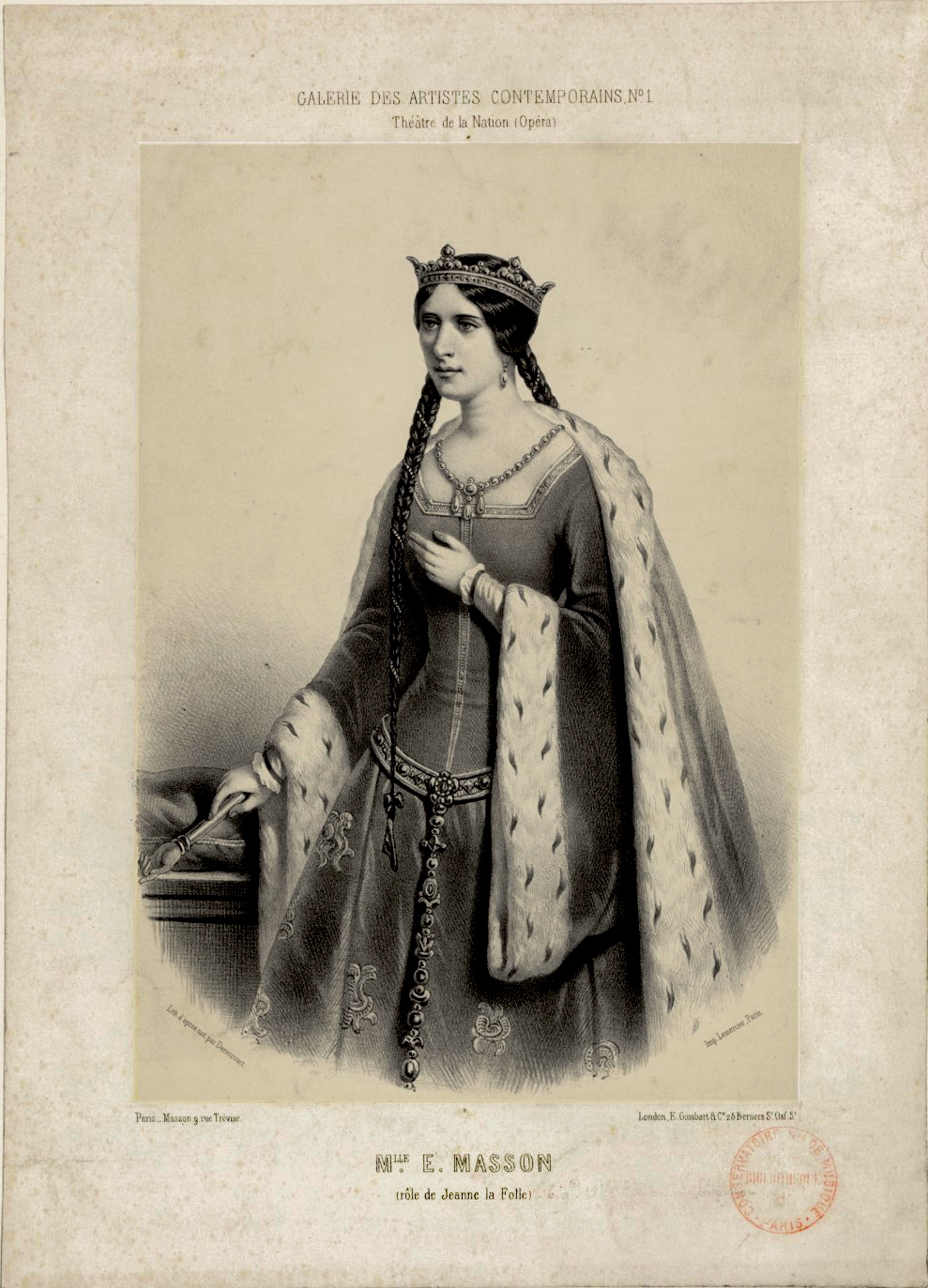
Élise Masson as Joanna of Castile

Élise Oscarine Masson, known by the stage name Elisa Masson, was a French mezzo-soprano (1824 or 1825 - 2 April 1867).

== Life and career ==
Born in Paris, she was a pupil of the famous tenor and singing teacher Gilbert Duprez. During this student period, Élise took part in concerts from 1842 onwards. She was hired by the Opéra-Comique for three years, and made her debut on 23 January 1843, singing the role of Camille in Hérold's opera Zampa. It was well received, although the inadequacy of her voice and her interpretation to the type of comic opera was criticized.

In July 1845, Gaetano Donizetti's La Favorite was performed in Rouen. The 1845–1846 period began with her participation in the Grand Théâtre de Nantes. Her only debut in this theatre was on 26 March 1846, playing the role of Odette in Jacques Fromental Halévy's opera Charles VI. She often performed there at the end of the 1864–1865 season. The year 1847 began at the Académie Royale de Musique with great creativity, in a performance of Charles VI, and another copy of the role of Odette. In September of the same year, in the same theatre, she played the role of Leonor in La Favorite, a performance which marked her debut, but which was actually her first performance of this opera in this theatre. On 16 June 1848, the opera L'Apparition, with music by M. Benoit to a libretto by Germain Delavigne, premiered at the Paris Opera. On 5 November 1848, the main role in the opera Jeanne la folle (after Joanna of Castile) by Antoine-Louis Clapisson, based on a libretto by Eugène Scribe, was premiered at the same theatre. For a better preparation of the role she had to play, in order to avoid the eccentricities of the operative stages of the trends of the time, she decided to visit the Salpêtrière Hospital in Paris, which then was a hospice and a madhouse. Although she was not well received by the inmates of the asylum, she managed to get an image of madness closer to reality than usual in theaters. Her decision to make Joana dignified and not at all crazy, was closer to reality than was usual in the theatres.

In 1849, she began to appear in other theatres outside Paris. For example, in Nîmes, Bordeaux, and in Lyon, where she returned in 1849, always in the role of La Favorite. In 1851, the first time she was announced at the Paris Opera, she was presented as "Leonor de La Favorite" in the only newspaper published which mentioned her. At that time she was, along with the singer Pauline Viardot, the favourite mezzo-soprano of the Paris public. In 1853, she played the role of the Duchess of Ostheim and won first prize at the Académie Impériale de musique for Verdi's Luisa Miller. This opera was performed in its original Italian version in Paris in December 1852, at the Théâtre Italien, with the role of the Duchess played by the mezzo-soprano Constance Nantier-Didiée.

Her performances throughout France continued until the 1855–1856 season, when she left for Milan, where she performed at La Scala theatre. The year of the signing of the contract with the Milan theatre he would appear at the beginning of Paris on the first day of June of that year. In 1856, she performed in the opera Le prophète by Giacomo Meyerbeer, playing the role of Fidès. A few months later, at noon, she performed this role again in Verona.

After the Italian season, she arrived in Barcelona, contracted by the Gran Teatre del Liceu. She made her debut with La favorita (sung in Italian) on 8 October 1857, also performing in that season Donizetti's Lucrezia Borgia (15 October), Verdi's Il trovatore (18 November), Dom Sébastien (sung in Italian) (19 December), Rossini's William Tell (sung in Italian) (1 February 1858), Rossini's Mosè in Egitto (16 March) in its premiere at the Liceu, Saverio Mercadante's Pelagio in its premiere at the Liceu (15 April) and the Liceu premiere of Mercadante's Il giuramento (4 May). She then went to Madrid for the season at the Teatro Real which began on 18 October 1858 with Lucrezia Borgia (15 October), Il trovatore (18 November), Dom Sébastien (sung in Italian), (19 December), William Tell (sung in Italian, (1 February 1858), Mosè in Egitto (16 March) in its premiere at the Liceu, Pelagio in its premiere at the Liceu (15 April) and the Liceu premiere of Il giuramento. On 3 November, she played Maddalena in Verdi's Rigoletto, according to the press, without much success. In that same season at the Real, she also performed Il trovatore (in the spring of 1859). In February, Masson ended her contract with the theatre, leaving Madrid. She was not the only singer to leave that month. She returned to France, where she continued to perform in different cities. In the evening of 1860, she sang at the Teatro della Pergola in Florence. In 1862, she went to Havana with an Italian opera company.

In the 1864–1865 season, she put an end to her stage career at the theatre in Nantes. According to the press, she seemed to be "more and more tired every day, she was no longer the shadow of her true self". In October 1866, feeling very ill, she wrote a letter that was published in La Comédie on 4 April 1867, when the singer was already dead: "I have just escaped death, I have kept my sight; Auber assures me that I will keep my place in Paris". She died at the end of March or beginning of April 1867, as a result of breast cancer. All the newspapers consulted stated that she had died at the age of 42, which gives a different date of birth (1825) to that indicated in some encyclopaedias of the time and today.
