= Fanny Puzzi =

Fanny Puzzi (1834 – 1913) was an Italian composer, impresario, and singer who composed songs. She was best known for her song “L’Indovina,” which was frequently performed, and for her family's work organizing concerts, which she continued in London.

Puzzi was apparently born in Italy, the third daughter of the soprano and impresario Giacinta Toso and the horn virtuoso and impresario Giovanni Puzzi. She died in London after living there for many years.

In 1869, composer Tito Mattei dedicated his song “Quand tu souris! (Deh! Parla) Romanza” to Puzzi. In 1885, soprano Zelia Trebelli performed one of Puzzi's songs in London, which The Theater journal called “an exceedingly taking canzone.” Her song “L’Indovina” was included in the first season of Henry Wood Proms in 1895.

Puzzi's songs were published by Boosey, R. Mills and Son, and G. Ricordi & Co.. They included:

- “Days Gone By” (text by Nella)
- “Dolce un Pensier”
- “L’Indovina”
- “Lily of the Valley”
- “Only a Flowe”r
- Passato e Avvenire (text by Cimino)
- Quando al l’Affao Schiuso
