= Giacinta Toso =

Italian operatic soprano

Giacinta Toso (1807–1889), (also Toso Puzzi or Puzzi Toso), Maman Puzzi, was an Italian operatic soprano who had a significant career in England during the 1820s and 1830s before ill health forced her to retire from the stage. For over half a century thereafter, she and her husband maintained a musical salon in London through which many of the greatest musical stars of the age made their entry into musical life in England.

== Professional and matrimonial engagement ==
She began her career as Giacinta Toso and was singing in Turin when she was first engaged to appear in England. Her story is closely involved with that of her husband, the horn player Giovanni Puzzi. He was an Italian who in early youth took up the cornet à pistons, and was brought before the public as a child prodigy. He was taken to Paris, where he played in an orchestra and was heard and admired by Napoleon Bonaparte, who made him a favourite and invited him to play and dine at his own table. The Duke of Wellington heard him there in 1815 and invited him to London, to Apsley House, and Puzzi made his way there in the following year. He also received the patronage of Louis Philippe. In addition to his admirable performance skills, he won special recognition as a most reliable judge of the abilities of young singers starting out, and for his complete ability in making the musical arrangements for the Italian opera.

Puzzi was sent to Florence to hear Signorina Adelaide Tosi, who had been spoken of favourably in England, heard her, and was disappointed. But he was redirected to Turin to hear Signorina Toso, whom he found to have great personal beauty, a 'natural but impassioned style, a pure vocal method and brilliant vocalization', and 'a fine, clear, fresh and melodious mezzo-soprano voice of considerable power'. So he engaged her, and she arrived in London in February 1827, where she soon succeeded Mme Rosalbina Caradori-Allen. Lord Mount Edgcumbe described her voice as of great compass, her upper notes clear and full, and the lower having the richness of a mezzo-soprano. Puzzi was so taken with her that he soon made her his wife.

For her benefit, Mercadante's Didone abbandonata (of 1823) was performed with Toso as Aeneas opposite Mme Pasta as Dido. John Waldie saw her in the opera Ricciardo, and thought she was 'awkward and screaming, without cultivation or science, tho' powerful and young and very tall'. In the same year she created the role of Queen Mary Stuart in the opera of that name by Carlo Coccia, opposite Giuditta Pasta, at His Majesty's Theatre in London. The Puzzis appeared in the musical life of various parts of Britain, such as the Royal Eisteddfod of 1828.

Puzzi Toso was Elisabetta in the difficult première of Donizetti's Maria Stuarda opposite Maria Malibran and Ignazio Marini at La Scala in December 1835, when the score, notably Elisabetta's part, was severely pruned.

== Premature end of singing career ==
Her career came to a premature end when, after a performance, she had to wait in the pouring rain at the draughty entrance of a London theatre, and caught a severe cold which developed into rheumatic fever: this was not properly diagnosed and took many months to overcome. After this the Puzzis became vocal professors and managers, and hosted many celebrity concerts (often accompanied by Michael Costa) in their Piccadilly salon at 38, Jermyn Street, which were attended by press magnates, patrons from the nobility, etc. Italo Gardoni was among those introduced in this way from Paris. Antonio Giuglini was a particular protégé of 'Mamma' Puzzi's, who protected him from predatory women and assisted in some of his escapades.

The Puzzis had daughters, the third of whom, Fanny Puzzi, was herself an accomplished singer and composer - a song of hers, L' Indovina, was included in the first season of Henry Wood Proms in 1895. Giovanni Puzzi in later life spent a good deal of time in Italy for his health, while Mme Puzzi remained in England as singing instructress to the daughters of the nobility.
