= Societa Armonica =

Organization giving musical concerts in London, England

The Societa Armonica, founded about 1827, gave subscription concerts in London, England.

Symphonies, overtures, and occasionally instrumental chamber works were intermingled with vocal numbers usually drawn from Italian operas. The concerts were successively held at the Crown and Anchor Tavern in the Strand, Freemasons' Tavern, and the Opera Concert room in the Haymarket. They terminated in or about the year 1850.

Beethoven's Overture in C major, Berlioz's Overture to Les francs-juges, Carl Gottlieb Reissiger's Overture in F minor, and the Overture to Meyerbeer's Les Huguenots were among the works which were first performed in England at the society's concerts.

Henry Forbes was the conductor, and Tolbecque and the younger Mori were the leaders of the orchestra. The orchestra included Spagnoletti, A. Griesbach, John Willy, Wagstaff, Joseph Dando, Patey, John Jay, Alsept, Robert Lindley, John Liptrot Hatton, Brookes, Domenico Dragonetti, Howell, Card, José María del Carmen Ribas, Barrett, and Thomas Harper.

Among the vocalists who appeared in the concerts were Giuditta Grisi, Fanny Tacchinardi Persiani, Emma Albertazzi, Wyndham, Anna Bishop, Mary Shaw Clara Novello and Charlotte Birch; Henry Phillips, Giovanni Battista Rubini, Antonio Tamburini, Luigi Lablache, Giovanni Matteo Mario and Nicholas Ivanoff.
