= Henry Forbes (composer) =

English pianist, organist and composer

Henry Forbes (1804 – 24 November 1859) was an English pianist, organist and composer.

Forbes was a pupil of George Thomas Smart, Johann Nepomuk Hummel, Ignaz Moscheles, and Henri Herz, and had greater success as executant and teacher than as composer. While organist of St Luke's Church, Chelsea, a London church, he published (1843) National Psalmody, containing some original numbers. His opera The Fairy Oak was disliked by the critics, but had a run of a week or two after its production at Drury Lane, 18 October 1845. A cantata, Ruth, was performed in 1847.

Forbes frequently associated with his brother George Forbes (1813–1883) in concerts, and was between 1827 and 1850 conductor of the Società Armonica. He died on 24 November 1859, in his fifty-sixth year.
