= Hail fellow well met =

English idiom

"Hail fellow well met" is an English idiom used when referring to a person whose behavior is hearty, friendly, and congenial, typically in an excessive or insincere manner.

== Etymology ==
The Oxford English Dictionary (OED) gives a 1589 quotation for this phrase as a friendly greeting, and quotations for the related phrase "hail fellow", a greeting that apparently dates to medieval times. "Well met" appears to have been added to the phrase in the 16th century to intensify its friendliness, and derives from the concept of "good to meet you", and also from the meaning of "meet" as something literally the right size for a given situation.

== Historic usage ==
In 1609 Thomas Dekker used the term in The Gull’s Hornbook: "when at a new play you take up the twelve-penny room next the stage, (because the Lords and you may seem to be haile fellow wel-met) there draw forth this booke, read alowd, laugh alowd, and play the Antickes, that all the garlicke mouthd stinkards may cry out, Away with the fool."

The expression appeared in Jonathan Swift's My Lady's Lamentation (1728).

The phrase appears in a section entitled "Sad"—in the Aeolus episode—in James Joyce's novel, Ulysses (1918), at the end of a description of the behaviour of newspaper men: "Funny the way the newspaper men veer about when they get wind of a new opening. Weathercocks. Hot and cold in the same breath. Wouldn't know which to believe. One story good till you hear the next. Go for one another baldheaded in the papers and then all blows over. Hailfellow well met the next moment."

The early twentieth-century English novelist W. Somerset Maugham frequently used the term in his novels and short stories, in particular when he describes male characters of a genial, sociable, and hard-drinking temperament (e.g., Of Human Bondage, The Trembling of a Leaf, and Then and Now).

== Contemporary usage ==
In contemporary language the phrase is used as shorthand for someone who is genial or hearty but with the implication of superficiality or ingratiation. There is a contemporary use of the phrase in the ITV series Downton Abbey. In Episode 7 of Season 4 Mrs. Patmore, the cook, uses the phrase hail fellow well met to refer to Americans.

== Linguistic observations ==
Kuiper uses the fact that this idiom is a phrase that is a part of the English lexicon (technically, a "phrasal lexical item"), and that there are different ways that the expression can be presented—for instance, as the common "hail-fellow-well-met," which appears as a modifier before the noun it modifies, versus the more original greeting form of "Hail fellow. Well met"; these variants are given as an example to explain how changes between the two (deformation), performed for the sake of artistry in writing (i.e., artistic deformation), can move alternative interpretations to the foreground (i.e., can create "syntactic ambiguity"); that is, ambiguity can be foregrounded by artistic deformation, including, Kuiper notes, toward the end of creating humorous interpretations.
