= Bettini v Gye =

English law case

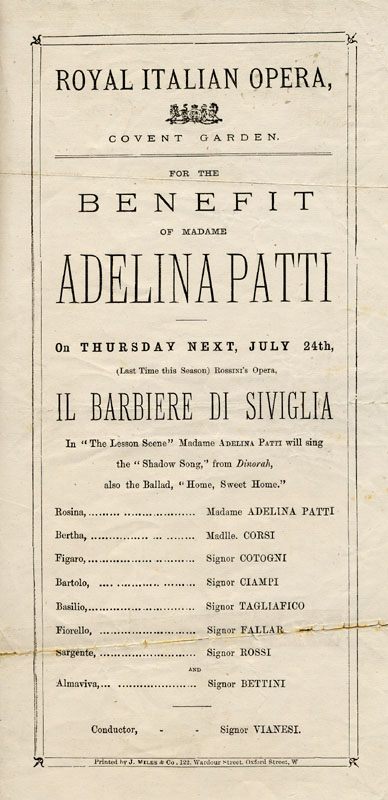
- Court: Queen's Bench
- Citation: (1876) 1 QBD 183

Court membership
- Judges sitting: Blackburn J, Quain J and Archibald J

Keywords
- Termination, condition, construction

Bettini v Gye (1876) 1 QBD 183 is an English contract law case concerning the right to terminate performance of a contract.

== Facts ==
The tenor Alessandro Bettini agreed with opera manager Frederick Gye that he would not sing anywhere within fifty miles of London except at the Royal Italian Opera, Covent Garden (now the Royal Opera House), from 1 January to 1 December, and would perform for him from 30 March to 13 July 1875 for £150 per month. Bettini was supposed to perform concerts or operas. Importantly, Bettini was meant to be in London ‘without fail’ 6 days before rehearsals, but did not arrive until 28 March, at which point he was ready to perform. However, Gye rejected Bettini’s performance.

== Judgment ==
Blackburn J held the provision for arriving 6 days before was not a condition, and therefore breach of it did not give rise to the right to terminate. If clear words had stipulated that in the event Mr Bettini did not show up Gye could terminate, or that Bettini would forfeit twice his salary, that would provide the answer. Here Bettini had already performed his covenant to not sing in the UK in the months running up to 30 March, and not showing for rehearsals could only affect theatrical performances and singing in duets during the first week or fortnight. So the breach did not go to the root of the contract, and Gye was not entitled to terminate.

The question raised by the demurrer is, not whether the plaintiff has any excuse for failing to fulfil this part of his contract, which may prevent his being liable in damages for not doing so, but whether his failure to do so justified the defendant in refusing to proceed with the engagement, and fulfil his, the defendant's part. And the answer to that question depends on whether this part of the contract is a condition precedent to the defendant's liability, or only an independent agreement, a breach of which will not justify a repudiation of the contract, but will only be a cause of action for a compensation in damages.

We think the answer to this question depends on the true construction of the contract taken as a whole.

Parties may think some matter, apparently of very little importance, essential; and if they sufficiently express an intention to make the literal fulfilment of such a thing a condition precedent, it will be one; or they may think that the performance of some matter, apparently of essential importance and primâ facie a condition precedent, is not really vital, and may be compensated for in damages, and if they sufficiently expressed such an intention, it will not be a condition precedent.

Lord Blackburn's statement in this case, that "it is quite in the power of parties to stipulate that some particular matters, however trivial they may be, yet shall, as between them, form conditions precedent" was taken up in a Scottish Court of Session case, Wade v Walden (1909) in circumstances considered "scarcely distinguishable" from the Bettini v Gye case.

== See also ==
- English contract law
