= Enrico Delle Sedie =

Italian opera singer (1824–1907)

Enrico Delle Sedie (1824–1907)

Enrico Augusto Delle Sedie (17 June 1824 – 28 November 1907) was an Italian operatic baritone who sang extensively in Europe, performing the bel canto repertoire and in works by Verdi.

== Early life ==
He was born in Livorno and studied with Cesario Galeffi.

== Career ==
After retiring from the stage, he taught at the Paris Conservatory from 1876 to 1886 and later privately. The renowned lyric tenor Alessandro Bonci was one of his pupils. "Although his voice was small, his style and musicianship were regarded as outstanding".

== Bibliography ==
Delle Sedie wrote two treatises on singing (1876, 1886) as well as the book Riflessioni sulle cause della decadenza della scuola di canto in Italia (Reflections on the decline of the School of Singing in Italy) (Paris, 1881).

== Legacy ==
A street in Livorno, the city of his birth, is named after him.
