= Constance Nantier-Didiée =

French opera singer (1831–1867)

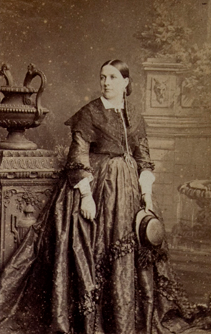
- Portrait of Constance Nantier-Didiée in 1860.
- Born: 16 November 1831; Saint-Denis, Réunion, France
- Died: 4 December 1867 (aged 36); Madrid, Spain
- Occupation: Opera singer (mezzo-soprano)
- Years active: 1849-1867

Constance Nantier-Didiée (16 November 1831 – 4 December 1867) was a French mezzo-soprano. According to commentators of her time, she was described as a true mezzo-soprano rather than a contralto. She had a wide range of comic, dramatic and travesty roles in her theatrical career developed in Paris, London, Moscow and Madrid.

== Career ==
Nantier-Didiée was born in Saint-Denis, Réunion. She studied with Gilbert Duprez at the Conservatoire de Paris, winning the first prize in opera in 1849. The following year she debuted in Turin, as Emilia in Saverio Mercadante's La vestale. Three years later, she appeared in Luisa Miller in Paris at the Théâtre-Italien, being hired the following year for three seasons at the Covent Garden, where he sang in the premieres of Rigoletto and Benvenuto Cellini on 2 July 1853. In 1854, she debuted at Teatro Real in Madrid and traveled to North America.

The 1856-1857 season was performed at the Liceu in Barcelona. The journal Diario de Barcelona exulted her as a "nice mezzo-soprano, and a contralto in some lower keys; someone of great intelligence, purity and ability in singing, very clean and agile execution, expressive and a good actress." (Note: "mezzosoprano de veu simpàtica i acontraltada en els punts greus; cantatriu de gran intelligència, puresa i habilitat en el cant glossat, de molt neta i àgil execució, expressiva i bona actriu.")

Nantier-Didiée returned to the Covent Garden on 15 May 1858 to play Urbain in Les Huguenots at the opening season, singing there every year until 1864. Meyerbeer's Dinorah and Gounod's Faust present arias written especially for her. Quando a te lieta, later translated to French as Si le bonheur a sourire t'invite was added by Gounod to a romance for her character. She was the first Preziosilla at the premiere of La forza del destino in Saint Petersburg in 1862, and also played Siébel for a production in Italian of Faust e Margherita at the Covent Garden in London in 1863.

She died of pneumonia on 4 December 1867 during performances of Gaetano Donizetti's La favorite at Teatro Real de Madrid.
