= Marietta Alboni =

Italian opera singer (1826–1894)

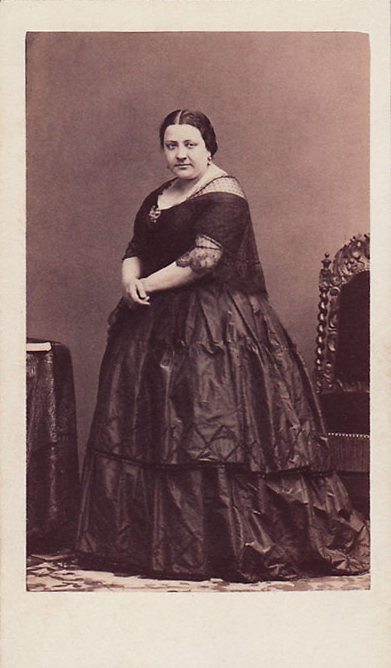
Marietta Alboni carte de visite by E. Disdéri

Maria Anna Marzia (called Marietta) Alboni (6 March 1826 – 23 June 1894) was an Italian contralto opera singer. She is considered "one of the greatest contraltos in operatic history".

== Biography ==
Alboni was born at Città di Castello, in Umbria. She became a pupil of Antonio Bagioli of Cesena, Emilia–Romagna, and later of the composer Gioachino Rossini, when he was 'perpetual honorary adviser' in (and then the principal of) the Liceo Musicale, now Conservatorio Giovanni Battista Martini, in Bologna. Rossini tested the humble thirteen-year-old girl himself, had her admitted to the school with special treatment, and even procured her an early engagement to tour his Stabat Mater around Northern Italy, so that she could pay for her studies. After she achieved her diploma and made a modest debut in Bologna, in 1842, as "Climene" in Pacini's Saffo, she obtained a triennial engagement thanks to Rossini's influence on the impresario Bartolomeo Merelli, Intendant at both Milan's Teatro alla Scala and Vienna's Imperial Kärntnertortheater. The favourable contract was signed by Rossini himself, "on behalf of Eustachio Alboni", father of Marietta, who was still a minor. The singer remained, throughout her life, deeply grateful to her ancient "maestro", nearly a second father to her.

Her debut at Teatro alla Scala took place in December 1842 as "Neocle" in the Italian version of Le siège de Corinthe, which was followed by roles in operas by Marliani, Donizetti (as "Maffio Orsini" and "Leonora" in the Scala premiere of an Italian version of La favorite), Salvi and Pacini. In the season 1844–1845 she was engaged in the Saint Petersburg Imperial Bolshoi Kamenny Theatre; later, in 1846–47, she toured the principal cities of Central Europe, finally reaching London and Paris, where she settled permanently. In London, "she appeared in leading roles by Rossini and Donizetti (where she outshone Giulia Grisi and Jenny Lind) and also sang Cherubino (performing with Henriette Sontag)". For the 1848 London run of Les Huguenots, Meyerbeer transposed the role of the page "Urbain" 'from soprano to contralto and composed the aria "Non! – non, non, non, non, non! Vous n'avez jamais, je gage" in Act 2' for her. On 28 August 1848, she sang at a concert in Manchester's Concert Hall, sharing the stage with Lorenzo Salvi and Frédéric Chopin. She toured the United States in 1852–53, appearing there with Camilla Urso.

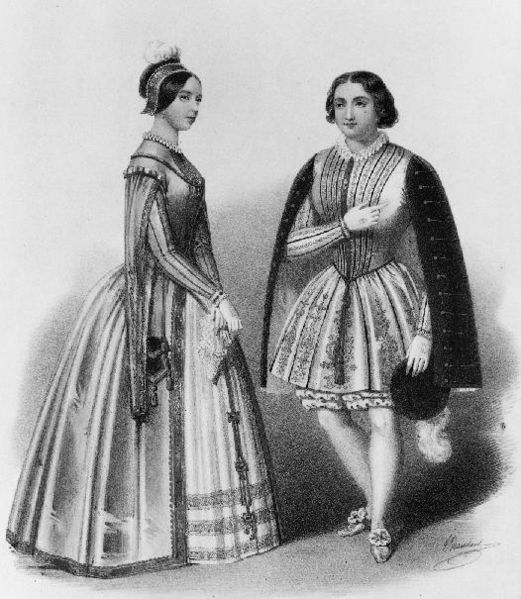
Viardot and Alboni in Meyerbeer's Les Huguenots, Covent Garden 1848

In 1853 she wed a nobleman, Count Carlo Pepoli, of the Papal States, but she kept her maiden name for the stage. In 1863 she had to retire the first time on account of her husband's serious mental illness. He died in 1867. A year later, in 1868, Alboni would take part in the funeral of her beloved master and friend, Rossini, in the Église de la Sainte-Trinité. There she sang, alongside Adelina Patti, the leading soprano of the time, a stanza of Dies irae, "Liber scriptum", adjusted to the music of the duet "Quis est Homo" from Rossini's own Stabat Mater. Out of deference to her master, she also accepted to resume her singing career mainly in order to tour the orchestral version of the Petite messe solennelle around Europe. Rossini had once expressed his hope that she would take upon herself to perform it when he was dead. He had said that he had composed it, and especially the new section "O salutaris", just having her voice in mind.

In 1872 she permanently retired from the stage with four performances of "Fidalma" in Cimarosa's Il matrimonio segreto, at the Paris Théâtre des Italiens but, in fact, she never gave up singing in private and in benefit concerts. When in 1887 the French and Italian Governments agreed upon moving the mortal remains of Rossini into the Basilica di Santa Croce in Florence, Alboni, then a sixty-one-year-old lady living in seclusion, wrote to the Italian Foreign Minister, Di Robilant, proposing that the Petite Messe Solennelle, "the last musical composition by Rossini", be performed in Santa Croce the day of the funeral, and "demanding the honour, as an Italian and a pupil of the immortal Maestro," of singing it herself in her "dear and beloved homeland". Her wish, however, never came true and she was just given the chance of being present at the exhumation ceremony in Paris. The Paris correspondent of the Rome newspaper Il Fanfulla wrote on the occasion: "photographers snapped in the same shot the greatest performer of Cenerentola and Semiramide, and what is left of the man who wrote these masterpieces".

In 1877 she had remarried—to a French military officer named Charles Zieger. She died at Ville-d'Avray, near Paris, in her "Villa La Cenerentola", and was buried at Père Lachaise Cemetery. Always engaged in charity (often in memory of Maestro Rossini), she left nearly all her estate to the poor of Paris. In her will she wrote that by singing she had earned all her fortune, and on singing she would pass away, with the sweet thought that she had employed it to encourage and to console.

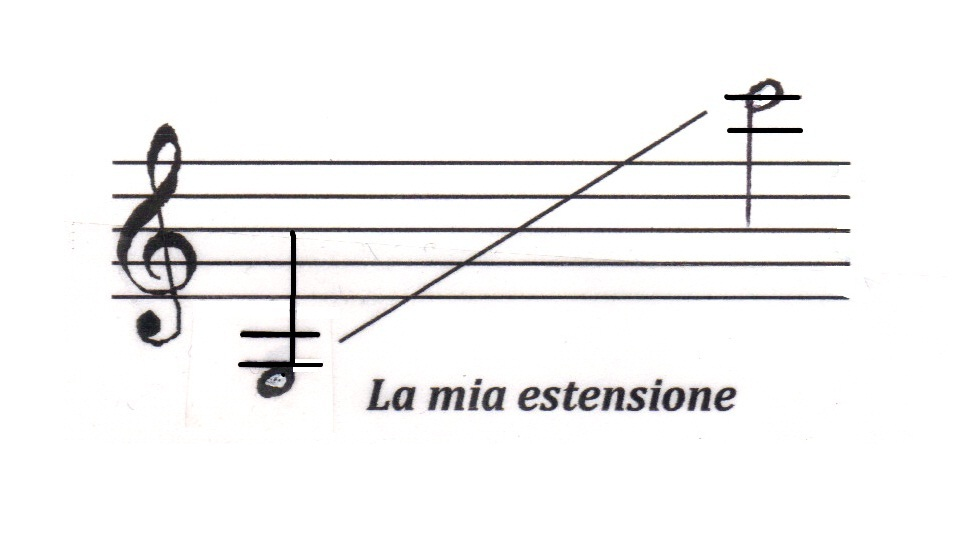
"My vocal range" (free reproduction of an annotation of Marietta Alboni's own vocal range, drawn by herself in a family album)

== Artistic features ==
Alboni's voice, an exceptionally fine contralto with a seamless compass of two and one-half octaves, extending as high as the soprano range, was said to possess at once power, sweetness, fullness, and extraordinary flexibility. She had no peers in passages requiring a sensitive delivery and semi-religious calmness, owing to the moving quality of her velvety tone. She possessed vivacity, grace, and charm as an actress of the comédienne type; but she was not a natural tragédienne, and her attempt at the strongly dramatic part of Norma was sometimes reported to have turned out a failure. Nevertheless, she scored a real triumph in 1850, when she made her operatic debut at the Paris Opéra performing the tragic role of "Fidès" in Meyerbeer's Le prophète, which had been created the year before by no less than Pauline Viardot. Furthermore, she was able to cope with such dramatic roles as "Azucena" and "Ulrica" in Verdi's Il trovatore and Un ballo in maschera, and even with the baritone role of "Don Carlo" in Ernani (London, 1847).

== Repertoire ==
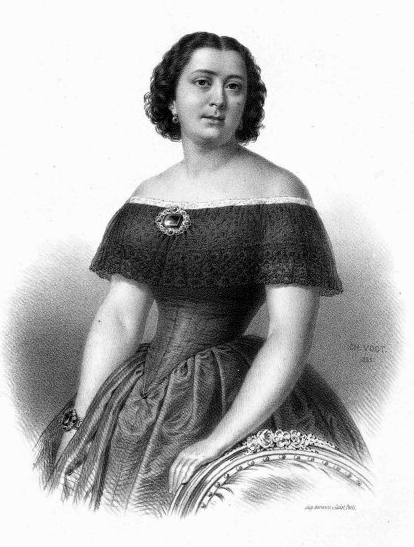
By Charles Vogt, 1855

The following list of the roles performed by Marietta Alboni was drawn up by Arthur Pougin and published in his biography of the singer. It is reported here with the addition of further works and characters according to the sources stated in footnotes.

- Anna Bolena, by Donizetti – Anna and Smeton
- L'assedio di Corinto, by Rossini – Neocle
- Un ballo in maschera, by Verdi – Ulrica
- Il barbiere di Siviglia, by Rossini – Rosina
- La Cenerentola, by Rossini – Cenerentola
- Charles VI, by Halévy – Odette
- Consuelo, by Giovanni Battista Gordigiani – Anzoletto
- Così fan tutte, by Mozart – Dorabella
- Il crociato, by Meyerbeer – Felicia
- Un curioso accidente, pastiche with music by Rossini
- David, oratorio, by Muhlig
- Don Giovanni, by Mozart – Zerlina
- Don Pasquale, by Donizetti – Norina
- La donna del lago, by Rossini – Malcolm and Elena
- L'ebrea, by Pacini – Berenice
- Ernani, by Verdi – Don Carlo, Giovanna
- La favorite, by Donizetti – Léonor
- La fille du régiment, by Donizetti – Marie
- La gazza ladra, by Rossini – Pippo and Ninetta
- Giovanna D'Arco, cantata, by Rossini
- Giulietta e Romeo, by Vaccai – Romeo
- Il giuramento, by Mercadante – Bianca
- Ildegonda, by Marco Aurelio Marliani – Rizzardo
- L'italiana in Algeri, by Rossini – Isabella
- Lara, by Salvi – Mirza
- Linda di Chamounix, by Donizetti – Pierotto
- Lucrezia Borgia, by Donizetti – Maffio Orsini
- Luisa Miller, by Verdi – Federica
- Maria di Rohan, by Donizetti – Gondi
- Martha, by Flotow – Nancy
- Il matrimonio segreto, by Cimarosa – Fidalma
- Messiah, oratorio by Händel
- La pazza per amore, by Coppola – Nina
- Norma, by Bellini – Norma
- Le nozze di Figaro, by Mozart – The page (Cherubino)
- Oberon, by Weber – Fatima
- Petite messe solennelle, mass by Rossini
- Le prophète, by Meyerbeer – Fidès
- La reine de Chypre, by Halévy – Catarina
- Rigoletto, by Verdi – Maddalena
- Saffo, by Pacini – Climene
- Semiramide, by Rossini – Arsace
- La sibilla, by Pietro Torrigiani – Ismailia
- La sonnambula, by Bellini – Amina
- Stabat mater, Marian hymn, by Rossini
- Tancredi, by Rossini – Tancredi
- Il trovatore, by Verdi – Azucena
- Zerline, by Auber – Zerline
- La zingara, by Balfe – Queen of the Gypsies
- Les Huguenots, by Meyerbeer – The page (Urbain)
