= Zelia Trebelli-Bettini =

French opera singer

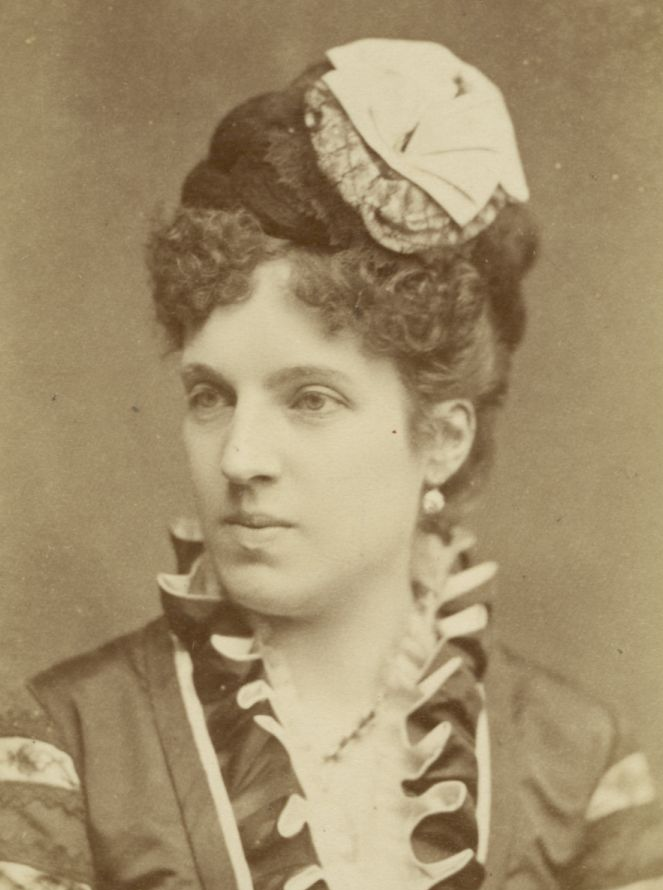
Portrait of Zelia Trebelli-Bettini

Zelia Trebelli (1836–1892) also known as Zelia Gilbert or by her stage name Trebelli, was a French operatic mezzo-soprano. Born Zélie Thérèse Caroline Gillebert in Paris, she died in Etretat. Mme Trebelli's artistry was greatly admired by George Bernard Shaw, who wrote about her a number of times in his various reviews. In particular, he admired her interpretations and her exemplary English diction, rare for a non-native English speaker.

In March 1863, in Paris, she married Alexandre Bettini, a lyric artist, and thus became Zelia Trebelli-Bettini

Her daughter Antonia (originally Antoinette) Dolores Trebelli (b.1864, Paris. d.1951, Stroud, England) was a distinguished soprano, and as "Madame or Mademoiselle Dolores" was well received in England, Australia and New Zealand.

== Gallery ==
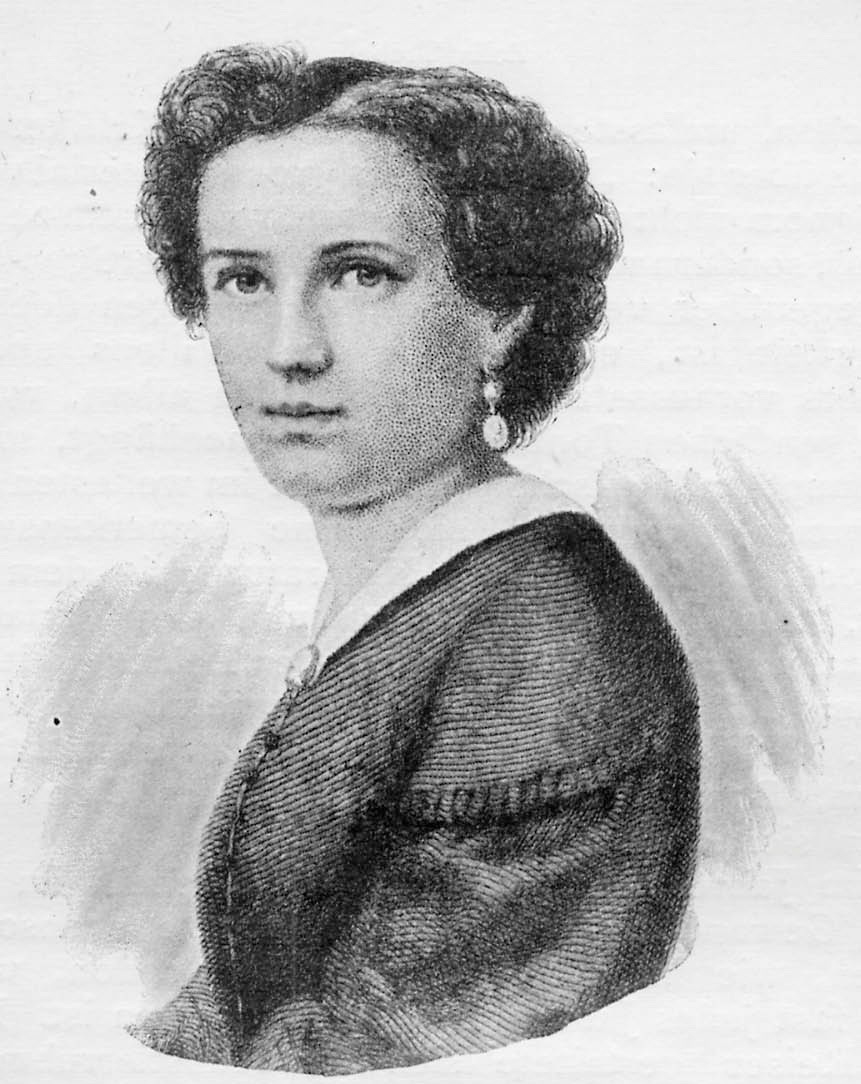
Zelia Trebelli-Bettini

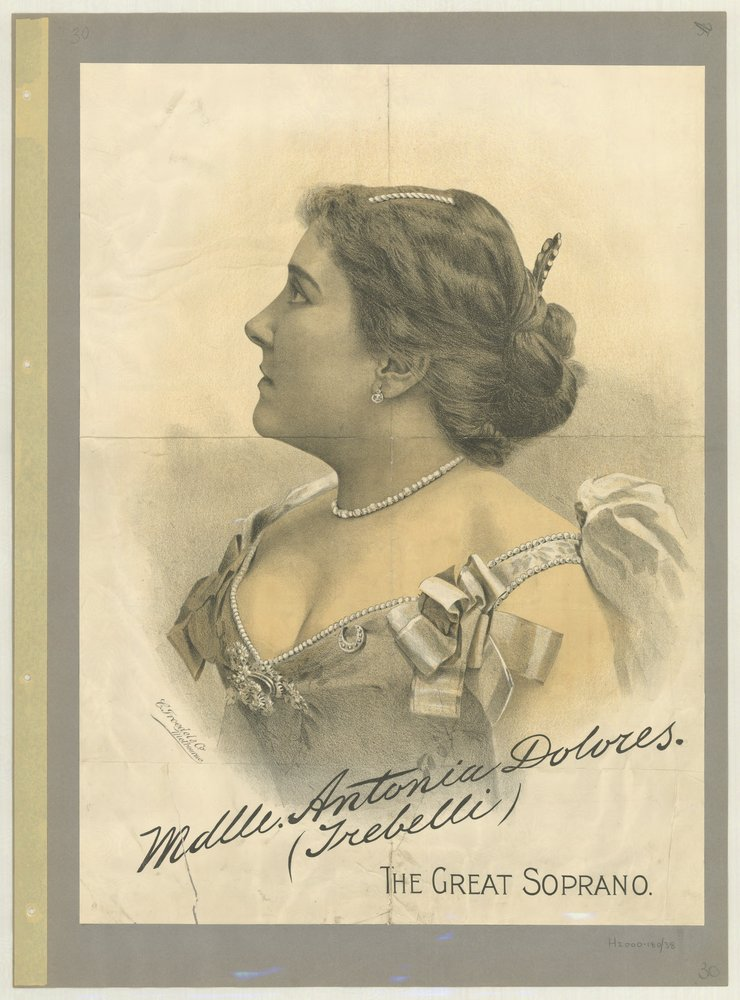
Autographed portrait of soprano "Madamoiselle Dolores" (Antonia Dolores Trebelli)

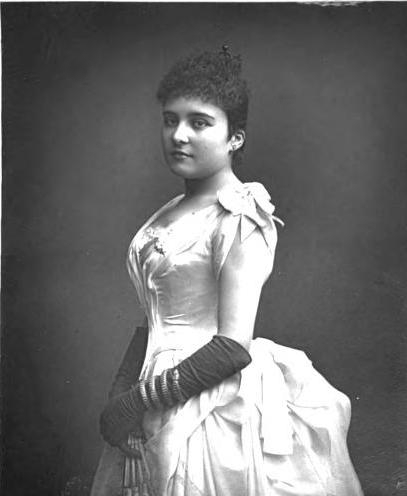
Antoinette Trebelli
