= Italo Campanini =

Italian opera singer (1845–1896)

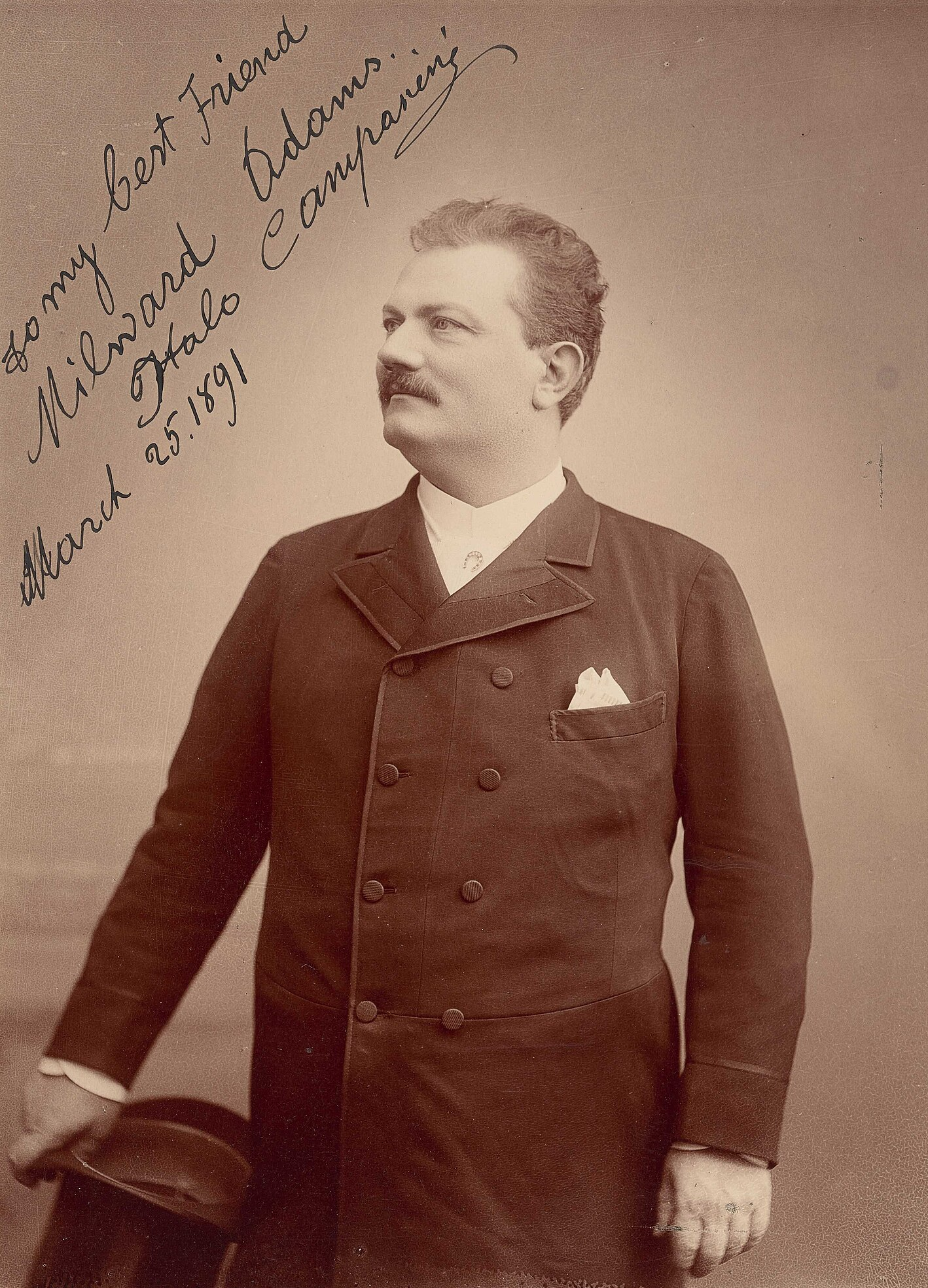
- Campanini, signed photo, 1891 (Newberry Library, Chicago)

Background information
- Born: 30 June 1845; Parma
- Died: 14 November 1896 (aged 51) Villa Vigatto, near Parma
- Genre: Opera
- Instrument: Singing (tenor)
- Years active: 1869–1890s

Italo Campanini (30 June 1845 – 14 November 1896) was a leading Italian operatic tenor, whose career reached its height in London in the 1870s and in New York City in the 1880s and 1890s. He had a repertoire of 80 operas and was the brother of the orchestral conductor Cleofonte Campanini.

== Early days ==
Born in Parma, Campanini was the son of Francesco Campanini and Anna Rosa Campanini (née Alessandri). His father worked as a blacksmith. Both he and his brother, the conductor Cleofonte Campanini, studied at the Parma Conservatory. There he studied singing with voice teacher Giuseppe Griffini. He made his operatic debut as Manrico in Il trovatore, in 1869, at the Odessa Opera. Further study with Francesco Lamperti in Milan followed, and in 1871 he returned to the stage in Bologna, scoring his first major success in the Italian premiere of Lohengrin.

== London beginnings ==
Early in his 1872 Drury Lane season J. H. Mapleson, the London opera impresario, recruited Campanini from Rome, where he was in competition with the agents of Frederick Gye, the Covent Garden theatre impresario. On May 4, 1872 the tenor made his London debut as Gennaro in Lucrezia Borgia, with Thérèse Tietjens in the title role and Zelia Trebelli as Orsini, under the baton of Michael Costa. He was an immediate success, being hailed by some as the tenor successor to Mario or Antonio Giuglini on what the critic Herman Klein (who attended) called a night of triumphs.

It was at Drury Lane that he first sang with dramatic soprano Christine Nilsson, to whom he became a celebrated stage partner. An agent from London attempted to lure him away at a rate of a thousand pounds sterling a month. He remained with Mapleson (at one-fifth of that sum) but became difficult to manage. However, he was to remain a stalwart and mainstay of Mapleson's company for the next ten years. In autumn 1872, he visited Dublin with the company (which included Ilma de Murska, Sofia Scalchi, and Signor Foli), and toured the main cities of England and Scotland. During the spring of 1873, they undertook a back-up tour of British provincial towns.

== First American tour ==
Campanini made his first American appearances at the Academy of Music, New York, in 1873. Here, in addition to Christine Nilsson and Giuseppe Del Puente (baritone) (regular Mapleson company singers), he was with Annie Louise Cary (with whom he often afterwards sang) in performances of Les Huguenots. On 26 November 1873 he was Rhadames in Max Strakosch's production of Aida, with Mlle Torriani (Aida), Cary (Amneris) and Victor Maurel (Amonasro), according to Gustav Kobbé (who saw it) a performance of unsurpassed brilliancy. He was still in New York on 23 March 1874 when he, Nilsson, Cary and Del Puente participated in the Italian-language production of Lohengrin at the Academy.

== London again ==
During his London career, Campanini became especially well known in the roles of Manrico (Il trovatore), Arturo (I puritani), and Edgardo (Lucia di Lammermoor). At his return for the 1874 season in London, in June he joined a Drury Lane cast in Michael Balfe's posthumous opera Il Talismano (Italian production) with Tietjens and Nilsson, and with the young Giovanni De Reschi in a baritone role (who later became the famous tenor Jean de Reszke). Les Huguenots and La favorita were among other productions of the season. In the 1875 season came the first London Lohengrin (with Emma Albani and Ernesto Nicolini at Covent Garden), soon followed by Mapleson's production at Drury Lane in which Campanini, Tietjens, Nilsson and Antonio Galassi (baritone) led a starry cast under the direction of Michael Costa.

The 1878 season was distinguished by the first London production of Bizet's opera Carmen, on June 22. Mapleson had seen it the previous winter at the Brussels Monnaie and decided to transfer it to Her Majesty's. He obtained the American soprano Minnie Hauk for Carmen, who had become famous in the role in Paris; Alwina Valleria portrayed Micaëla, and Giuseppe Del Puente Escamillo, to Campanini's Don José— under Michael Costa's baton. Despite the misgivings of the artists in rehearsal, it was an extremely effective cast among which Campanini himself was conspicuous for his singing and acting, reputedly with superb dramatic power, and it was greeted with a triumphant reception. Klein and the famous singing teacher Manuel Garcia were in the audience.

== English summers, American winters ==
In the winter of 1878-79 Mapleson undertook a major opera tour of the United States, in which Campanini was his principal tenor. The company also included such well known singers as Etelka Gerster, Minnie Hauk, Zelia Trebelli, Valleria, Galassi, and Del Puente. Luigi Arditi was the conductor. It visited Washington, D.C., Boston, Chicago, St Louis, Philadelphia, Baltimore, Cincinnati and New York. Campanini sang opposite Gerster in Il talismano and La traviata, and with Marie Roze in La favorita, and a very wide range of operas was presented including Faust, Il flauto magico, Le nozze di Figaro, Don Giovanni, Il barbiere di Siviglia, Ruy Blas, Robert le Diable and Der Freischütz, in addition to much of the repertoire already mentioned. The series culminated with a benefit concert in New York for flood victims at Szegedin in Hungary (Gerster's birthplace).

Some surprises were, however, held in store for New York in the following year. The London 1879 season had added Minnie Hauk, and Clara Louise Kellogg to the female company (still led by Nilsson, Trebelli and Gerster), and Campanini was supported by the tenors Giuseppe Fancelli, Frapolli and Brignoli. Fancelli was infuriated by Campanini assuming the title 'Primo Tenore Assoluto'. The October 1879 tour season, in which Maria Marimon was among the party, visited New York, and went on to Philadelphia, Chicago, St Louis, Detroit, Cleveland and elsewhere. Campanini conquered New York. On 23 October at the Academy they gave the American premiere of Carmen, with Minnie Hauk in the title role, Clarice Sinico as Micaela, Giuseppe del Puente as Escamillo, and Campanini in his now famous role of Don José. On 3 December, he appeared as Elvino in La sonnambula, with Marimon, del Puente and Mme Lablache, and on December 12 was Corentino in Meyerbeer's Dinorah, again with Marimon. Later in the season, when Marimon was unable to complete a performance of Dinorah at Philadelphia, Campanini (in the audience) and Annie Louise Cary stepped in to sing the last acts of Il trovatore instead, and Campanini's rendition of "Di quella pira" brought the house down and saved the box-office.

The London Her Majesty's season of 1880, with Nilsson and Gerster, saw presentations of Faust, La sonnambula, Carmen and Aida under Michael Costa, and also a Lohengrin conducted for Mapleson by Hans Richter.

But the major new event of the season, in July, was Boito's Mefistofele, with Nilsson, Trebelli and Nannetti, and with Campanini as Faust. Costa conducted it 'in his old, resolute and vigilant manner', and the production 'lent a special distinction to the season.' This then went on tour to New York (under Arditi, as usual), where Campanini led the cast for the American premiere at the Academy of Music with Annie Louise Cary, Alwina Valleria, and Franco Novara. The same venue saw Mapleson's production of a revised form of Les vêpres siciliennes headed by Campanini and Cary with del Puente and Galassi in support. Campanini performed, too, in La favorita.

Mapleson had by now recruited Luigi Ravelli to relieve the burden on Campanini, who had become his only principal tenor. During the tour, which this time also took in Pittsburgh and Indianapolis, Mapleson inaugurated 'Sunday evening concerts', the first half of which was usually a performance of Rossini's Stabat Mater given by Valleria, Cary, Campanini, Galassi and Novara.

The London season of 1881 resumed the run of Mefistofele, and the October tour in New York saw Camapanini perform in Lohengrin (with Minnie Hauk, Anna de Belocci, Galessi and Novara) and in Carmen (Hauk, Valleria and del Puente, the original line-up.)

In February 1882, the company was at the second great Cincinnati Opera Festival, where Campanini appeared again as Don José (opposite Hauk, del Puente and Louise Dotti). The company also staged Les Huguenots, Faust, Fidelio, Magic Flute, William Tell and Lohengrin. Meanwhile, the company also rehearsed, and then presented, Meyerbeer's L'Africaine, in which Campanini played Vasco da Gama opposite Hauk and Galassi; and in the spring 1882 Ernani, Don Giovanni and Les Huguenots were produced at the New York Academy of Music.

== Collapse of Mapleson's company ==
On his return to England, Campanini found that the 1882 season was being disrupted by negotiations over the Royal Italian Opera Company, Covent Garden, Ltd — formed to seek the lease of the new Metropolitan Opera House, New York, which was then being built. Campanini was among the large team taken to New York that October by Mapleson, with Commander Herbert Gye as his treasurer, on its behalf. If the plan worked, the Academy (to which Mapleson was still tied by contract) would be closed and a monopoly achieved, in which he would have a share.

Despite immense difficulties a successful tour was achieved, but in the process all Mapleson's resources were carved up between the American impresario, Henry Eugene Abbey, who actually obtained the lease, and the Royal Opera Company, which repudiated all its agreements with Mapleson, leaving him with a heavy liability. The best singers of his company, including Nilsson, Marcella Sembrich, Scalchi, Trebelli and Campanini, and all his orchestral and choral resources, were recruited by Abbey.

Campanini took the occasion to spend a season in Italy, where his younger brother Cleofonte Campanini was launching a significant career as an operatic conductor. In 1883, at Parma, Campanini sang in a series of performances conducted by his brother, so helping to establish him as conductor of the first rank.

When he returned to America in the autumn it was to the completion of the Metropolitan Opera House, and there he sang in the performance of Faust on the opening night, 22 October 1883, with Christine Nilsson as Marguerite, Sofia Scalchi, Mme Lablache, Franco Novara and Giuseppe del Puente. On 5 December 1883, he sang the other Faust (Boïto's) in Mefistofele, with Christine Nilsson, Zelia Trebelli and Mdlle Mirabella filling out the cast.

== American career, vocal characteristics and tenor rivals ==
After 1883, Campanini lived primarily in New York City, serving as the Metropolitan's leading tenor. He developed increasingly a second career as a manager of opera (as, in later times, did the tenors Giovanni Zenatello and Edward Johnson). On 16 April 1888, a company under Campanini's management presented the American premiere of Verdi's Otello at the New York Academy of Music, with Francesco Marconi, Eva Tetrazzini, Antonio Galassi and Sofia Scalchi: later in the run, Campanini himself took over from Francesco Marconi in the role of Otello. Campanini's brother Cleofonte was brought in to conduct, and he married the Eva Tetrazzini, the famed Luisa's older sister. Campanini remained a member of the Metropolitan company from 1891 to 1894.

Campanini died at the Villa Vigatto, near Parma, in 1896.

While in New York, he recorded 6 cylinders for aristocrat and amateur entrepreneur Gianni Bettini of arias from Faust, Otello, Aida, and Barber of Seville. Nowadays, all of those recordings are lost; although there have been a few sightings of one or two of them over time, including one by Rosa Raisa when she was visiting the home of Eva and Cleofonte Campanini. During the peak of his career, Campanini's main tenor rivals among his Italian and Italianate contemporaries were Roberto Stagno, Julián Gayarre, Angelo Masini, Francesco Tamagno, Fernando Valero and Francesco Marconi. Of these only Tamagno, Valero and Marconi have surviving gramophone records of their art. Masini did record his voice at around the turn of the century on multiple occasions, and his recordings were actually broadcast on Russian radio, but nowadays all of them are considered to be lost.

== Literature ==
- D. Ewen, Encyclopedia of the Opera: New Enlarged Edition (Hill and Wang, New York 1963).
- J. McPherson, "Italo Campanini: One of a Kind", The Opera Quarterly, 19 no 2 (Spring 2003), 251-271.
