= Edward Tyrrel Smith =

British entrepreneur and showman

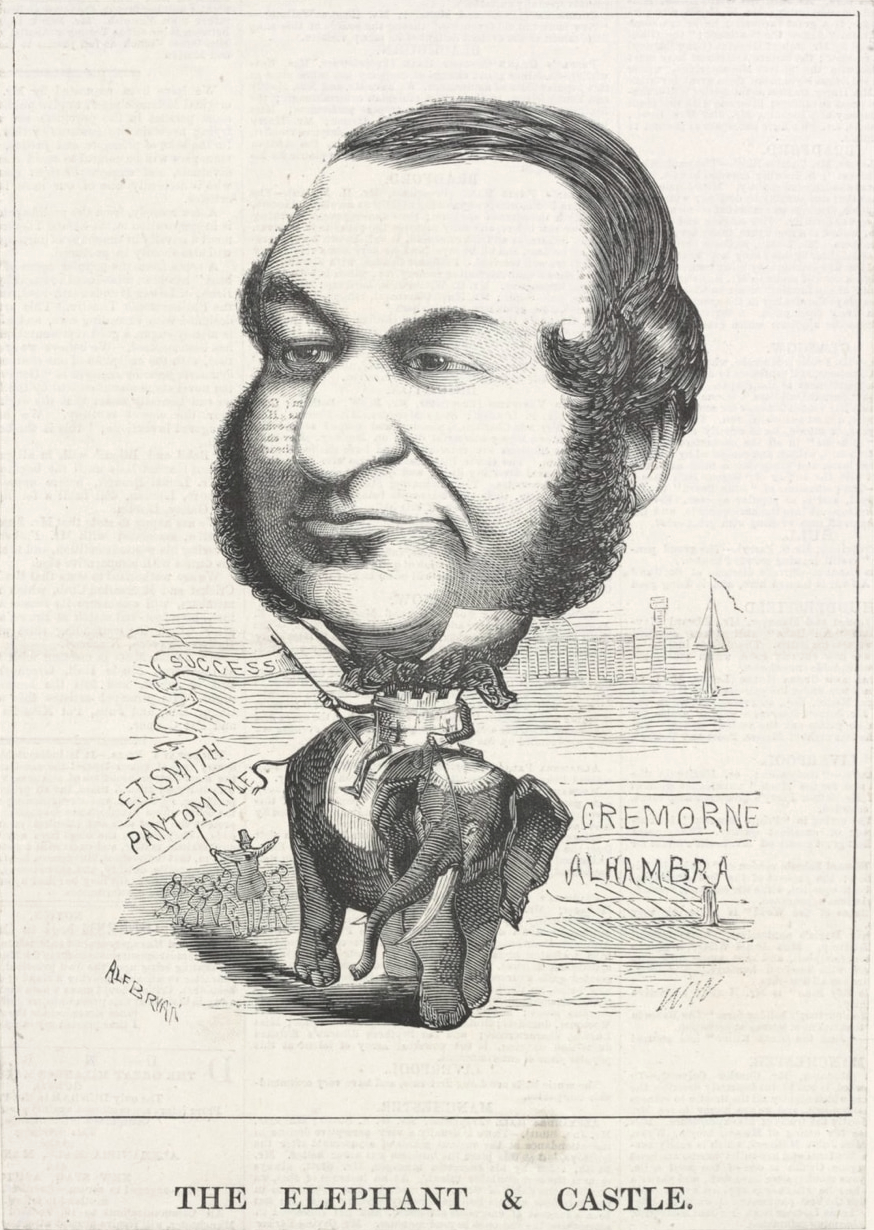
Edward Tyrrel Smith, 1872 caricature

Edward Tyrrel Smith (1804–1877) was a versatile British entrepreneur and showman, best known as an opera and theatrical manager.

== Life ==
He was the illegitimate son of the Irish naval officer Edward Tyrrell Smith (died 1824). His mother is supposed to be Charlotte Atkyns, with whom Smith had two children. Clement Scott gives the anecdote that he was about to sail as a midshipman with Lord Cochrane, when his mother objected.

For a period of the 1840s, Smith took over the London premises of Crockford's in St James's Street, and ran a restaurant there. He was also involved in attempts to revive the popularity of Vauxhall Gardens.

Smith began two decades in theatre management by leasing the Marylebone Theatre from 1850 to 1852, without much success. Then from 1852 for ten years he had the Drury Lane Theatre, innovating with matinées and finding popularity with an adaptation of Uncle Tom's Cabin and pantomime. He developed other interests by the later 1850s: a touring circus company and the Sunday Times. From 1858 he staged circus at the converted Alhambra Theatre.

Moving into opera, Smith was tackling an area in which competition with Frederick Gye at Covent Garden was serious. Gye had worsted Benjamin Lumley at Her Majesty's Theatre, and the legal case Lumley v Gye had addressed dirty tricks of the trade. Smith and then his sometime assistant James Henry Mapleson made a contest of it. In 1860 Smith staged Sims Reeves at Her Majesty's Theatre. Suffering a year with heavy losses, he was still able to take on Cremorne Gardens for a period from 1861, Astley's Amphitheatre briefly in 1862, and the Royal Lyceum at the end of the decade.

The 1870s saw Smith take one year at the Surrey Theatre, and then diversify into music hall and the restaurant trade. He died on 26 November 1877 at home, Oval House in Kennington Park.

== Family ==
Smith married Madeline Hanette Gengoult, and was father of Louis Smith. He married again, late in life.
