= Lumley v Wagner =

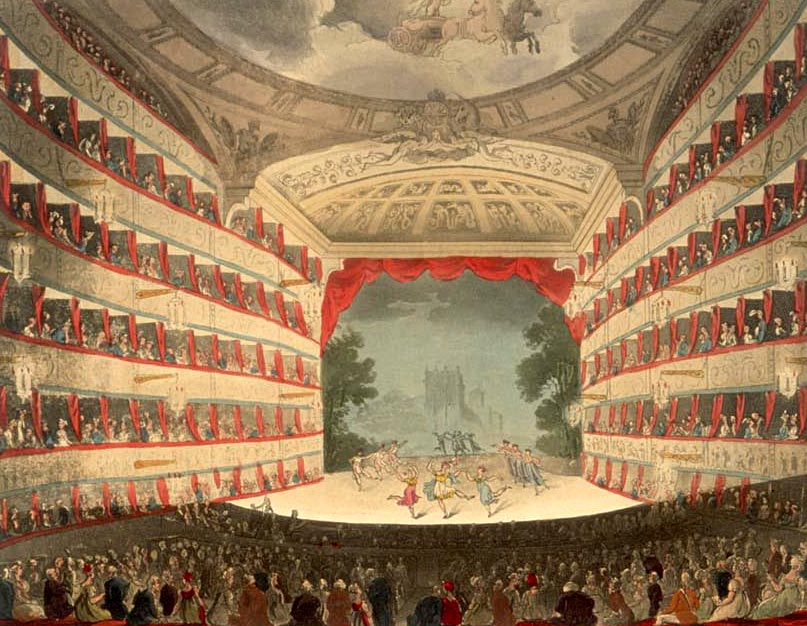
- Court: Chancery Court
- Citations: [1852] EWHC (Ch) J96, (1852) 64 ER 1209, (1852) 5 De Gex & Smale 485

Keywords
- Termination, condition

Lumley v Wagner [1852] EWHC (Ch) J96 is an English contract law case, concerning the right to terminate performance of a contract.

== Facts ==
Mlle Johanna Wagner was engaged by Benjamin Lumley to sing exclusively at Her Majesty's Theatre on Haymarket from 1 April 1852 for 3 months, two nights a week. Frederick Gye, who ran Covent Garden Theatre, offered her more money to break her contract with Mr Lumley and sing for him.

Sir James Parker granted an injunction to restrain Mlle Wagner. She appealed.

== Judgment ==
Lord St Leonards LC, in the Court of Chancery, held the injunction did not constitute indirect specific performance of Wagner's obligation to sing. So an order could be granted that prohibited Mlle Wagner from performing further other than at Her Majesty's Theatre.

Wherever this Court has not proper jurisdiction to enforce specific performance, it operates to bind men's consciences, as far as they can be bound, to a true and literal performance of their agreements; and it will not suffer them to depart from their contracts at their pleasure, leaving the party with whom they have contracted to the mere chance of any damages which a jury may give. The exercise of this jurisdiction has, I believe, had a wholesome tendency towards the maintenance of that good faith which exists in this country to a much greater degree perhaps than in any other; and although the jurisdiction is not to be extended, yet a Judge would desert his duty who did not act up to what his predecessors have handed down as the rule for his guidance in the administration of such an equity. It was objected that the operation of the injunction in the present case was mischievous, excluding the Defendant J. Wagner from performing at any other theatre while this Court had no power to compel her to perform at Her Majesty's Theatre. It is true that I have not the means of compelling her to sing, but she has no cause of complaint if I compel her to abstain from the commission of an act which she has bound herself not to do, and thus possibly cause her to fulfil her engagement. The jurisdiction which I now exercise is wholly within the power of the Court, and being of opinion that it is proper case for interfering, I shall leave nothing unsatisfied by the judgment I pronounce. The effect, too, of the injunction in restraining J. Wagner from singing elsewhere may, in the event of an action being brought against her by the Plaintiff, prevent any such amount of vindictive damages being given against her as a jury might probably be inclined to give if she had carried her talents and exercised them at the rival theatre: the injunction may also, as I have said, tend to the fulfilment of her engagement; though, in continuing the injunction, I disclaim doing indirectly what I cannot do directly.

== See also ==
- English contract law
- Lumley v Gye
- Bettini v Gye
- Involuntary servitude
