= Slave Kidnapping Act of 1866 =

United States legislation

The Slave Kidnapping Act of 1866 was an act passed in the United States that punished a person who carried away another person, without their consent, into a forced form of servitude. The punishment for this crime consisted of a fine of five hundred to five thousand dollars and/or five years in prison.
