= Palazzo Sangiorgi =

Coordinates: 44°13′28″N 12°02′06″E

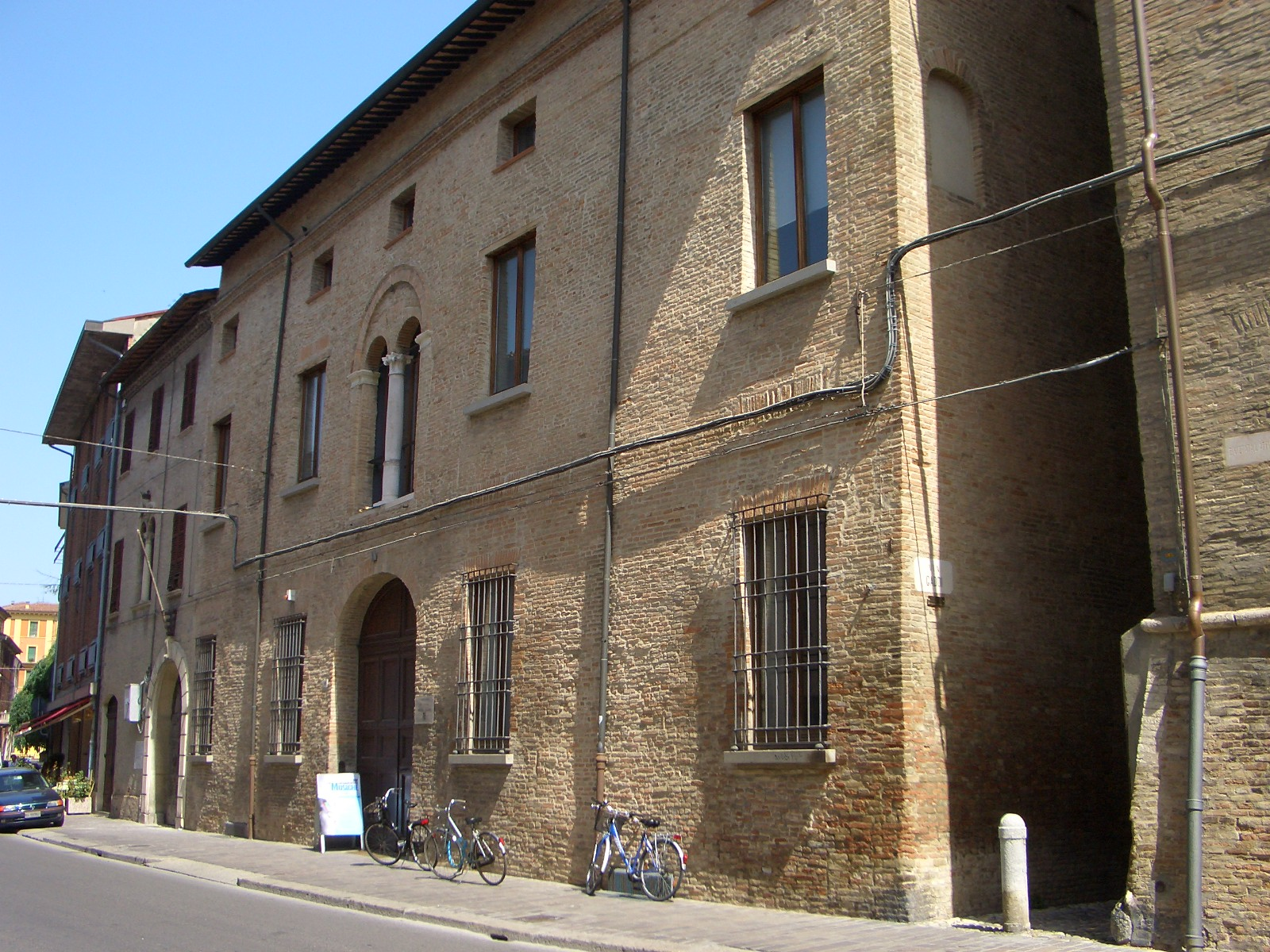
Palazzo Sangiorgi in Forlì. Seat of the Liceo Musicale "Angelo Masini"

Palazzo Sangiorgi is a palace in Forlì, Emilia-Romagna, northern Italy.

The lack of relevant documentation concerning Palazzo Sangiorgi, only mentioned as "accessory building" to the adjoining Palazzo Gaddi, makes the identification of the Palace's original purposes very difficult.

The Palace includes two different buildings separated by an internal courtyard: one facing Corso Garibaldi and an inner one, edging Vicolo Gaddi. A second courtyard is located behind the inner building. The renovation that took place in the 1980s confirmed the theory by which the house was an accessory building partly intended to be a stable and partly a farmer's house.

The distinguished wide vaulted room in the inner building, first thought to be a boardroom, was discovered to be a stable. The renovation work brought to light a second cobblestone floor under the tiled one, animal housing facilities along the border walls and a lower central area divided by a gully heading to a drain in the courtyard.

The elegant facade, contrasting with the original building purposes, was probably built in a later period.

Since September 1988 Palazzo Sangiorgi is the Seat of the Liceo Musicale "Angelo Masini".

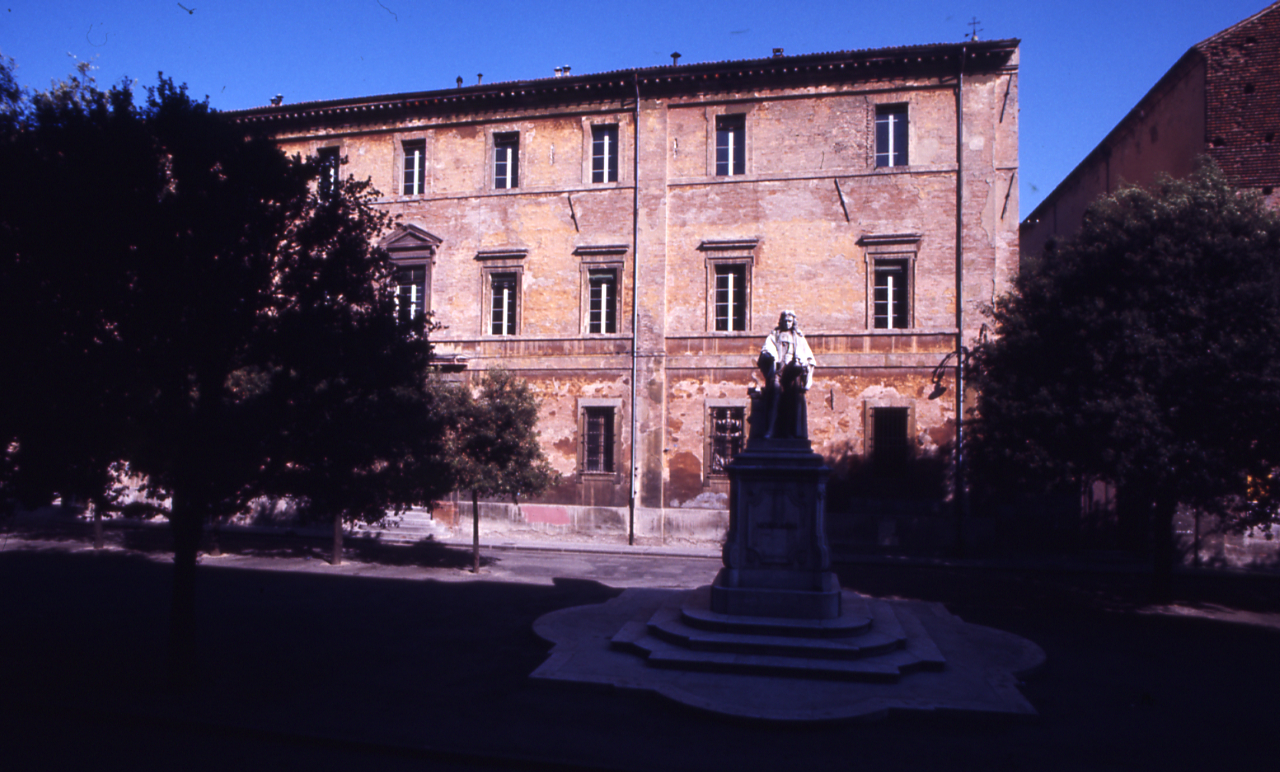
Photo by Paolo Monti, 1971

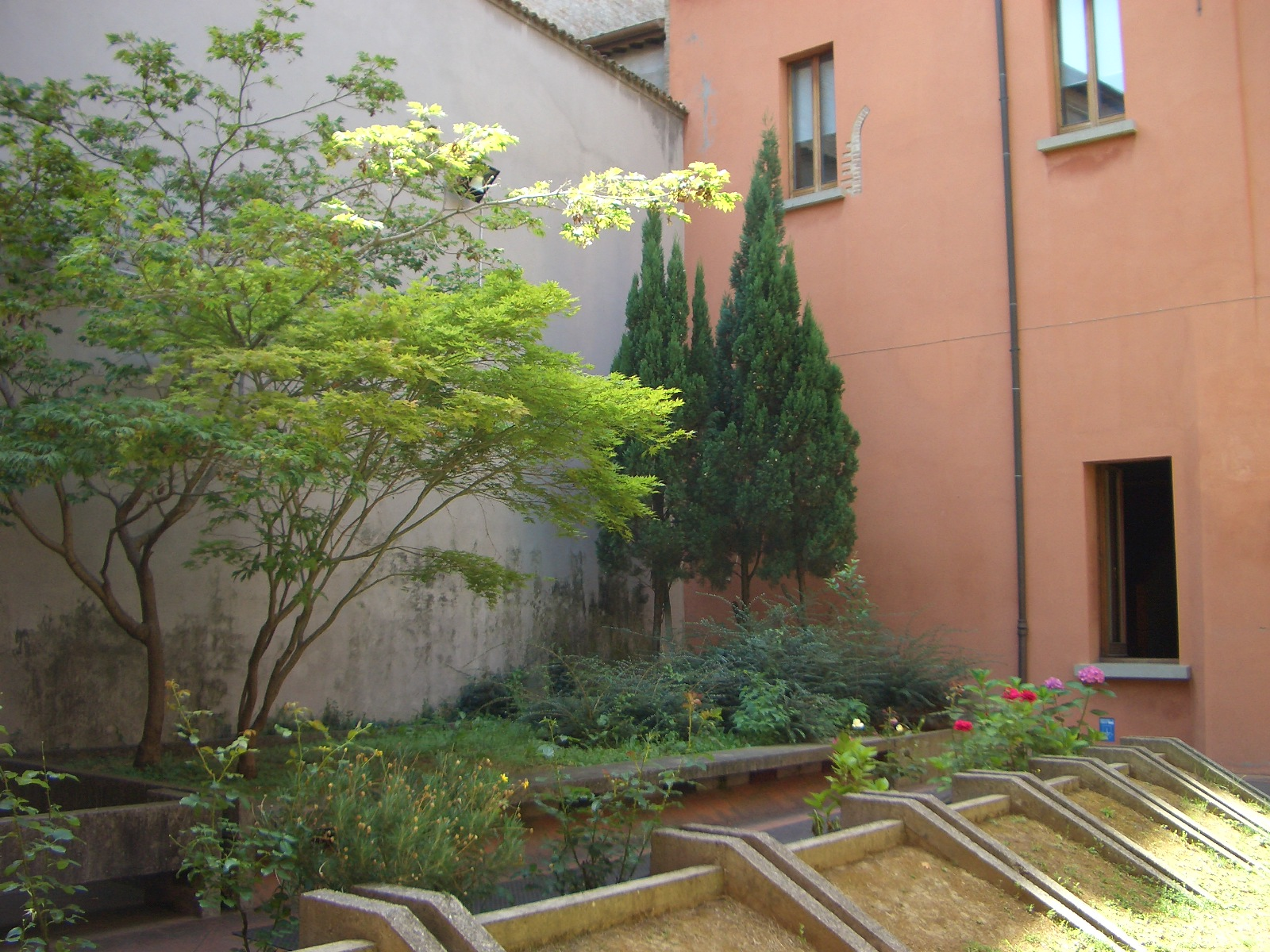
Palazzo Sangiorgi in Forlì. Internal courtyard

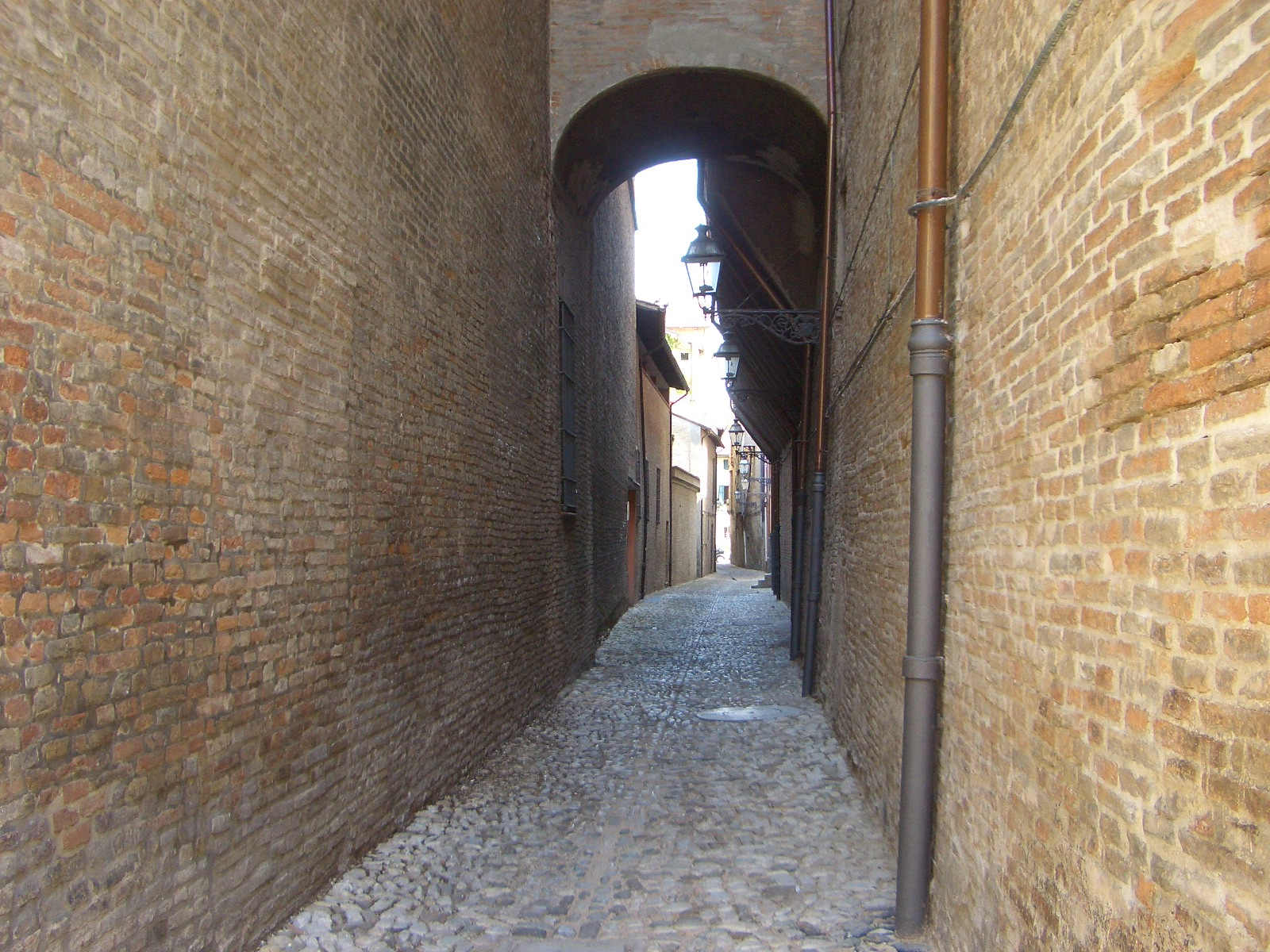
Vicolo Gaddi in Forlì, siding Palazzo Sangiorgi
