= Angelo Masini =

Italian opera singer (1844–1926)

Angelo Masini (November 27, 1844 – September 28, 1926) was an Italian tenor. Throughout his career, he sang at the principal theatres of Italy, Spain, and Russia, where he sang for over 20 years (particularly at the Mariinski in Saint Petersburg and the Bolshoi in Moscow). Composer Giuseppe Verdi once stated "his voice is the most Divine I've ever heard. It sounds as if it is made of pure velvet", and hailed him as "the tenor from Paradise".

He played 48 roles in total, which encompassed roles from the leggero fach, such as Arturo in Bellini's I puritani and Don Ramiro in Rossini's La Cenerentola, all the way to heavier roles such as Pery in Gomes' Il Guarany and the title role in Wagner's Lohengrin.

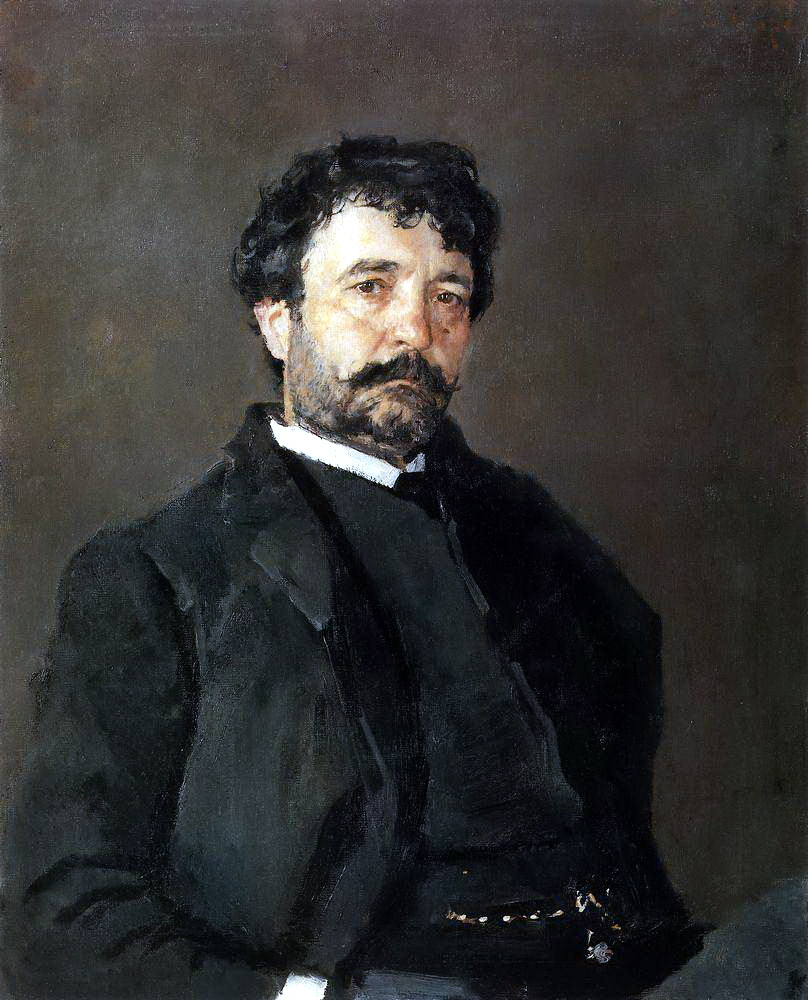
Portrait of Angelo Masini

== Early life and education ==
The son of Stefano and Maria Zoli, Masini was born in Forlì on November 27, 1844. Some sources, such as Grove Music Online, state he was born a day later in Terra del Sole. However, the Biographical Dictionary of Italians (2008) states that this was the date of his baptism, not birth. The discrepancy in dates is further explained by Masini's biographer, Luigi Inzaghi, who in his 2002 book on the tenor describes how Masini was born at his parent's home and was originally baptized by a midwife on the day of his birth, November 27. However, serious health problems led his parents to take Angelo to a hospital in Terra del Sole where he was baptized a second time by the priest Vitaliano Pazzi on November 28, 1844.

Since his parents were not married and Forlì was a part of the Papal States, where extra-marital affairs were frowned upon, Masini was taken away from his parents to be raised by a foster mother, Teresa Farneti, in San Martino in Strada. Eventually his parents married in 1848, and Angelo was allowed to return to their care in 1850 at the age of six; residing with his parents in a home in the village of Schiavonia in Veneto. He grew up in poverty and apprenticed as a shoemaker under his father's instruction, thereby assisting in the financial support of the Masini family.

Masini initially studied singing with a local teacher without much success. He moved to Bologna as an older teenager after obtaining a job as a customs guard. Here, by chance, he was heard singing by the famous soprano Virginia Boccabadati who offered to give him singing lessons. He studied briefly with her, but stopped for financial reasons which forced him to leave the city of Bologna. He settled in Forli where he was grounded in bel canto technique by soprano Gilda Minguzzi Zoli. On October 13, 1864 Masini, nearly 20 years old, married Annunziata Clabacchi in Forli. This marriage took place during his studies with Zoli, and the couple later had two sons, Francesco (born 1865) and Edgardo (born 1870).

== Early career ==
Masini made his debut as Pollione in Bellini's Norma at the Teatro Grillengoni in Finale Emilia in April 1868 with Marietta De Zorzi in the title role. He repeated this role in Mantua in 1869. At Finale Emilia, he was heard by impresario Luigi Scalabrini who offered him a three-year contract which he accepted. He was also employed at the Teatro Civico (Cagliari) in 1868-1869; performing there in Giuseppe Apolloni's L'ebreo, Gaetano Donizetti's La favorite, and Giuseppe Verdi's La traviata among other operas.

In his early career Masini struggled to impress, and his performances were hampered by battles with stage fright. He was hired to sing Fernando in Donizetti's La favorita at the Teatro Comunale di Bologna in the 1868-1869 season, but the offer was withdrawn after the opera's conductor, A. Mariani, thought Masini unable to perform the role. However, just six months after this production he successfully sang both Fernando and Riccardo in Maria di Rohan in Tortona in 1869. He would then go on to sing at Bologna, Ravenna, Cesena, Venice and Pisa (cities where the local opera houses had strong ties with Scalabrini), but also at cities independent of Scalabrini, such as Florence, Turin, Modena, Rovereto, Ferrara, Lucca, Foligno and Palermo. In 1871 he sang the tile roles in Charles Gounod's Faust in Rome and Donizetti's Dom Sébastien in Bologna.

== International career ==
In 1873, Masini sang abroad for the first time at the Teatro Nacional de São Carlos in Lisbon as the Duke in Verdi's Rigoletto; a role in which he was so popular, he would occasionally have to encore his act three aria, "La donna è mobile", up to 6 times. He was hired for the entire 1874 season. On that same year, he also auditioned at the La Scala opera house in Milan. He was not hired, but editor Giulio Ricordi, who was present at the audition, was impressed by Masini's voice and recommended him to composer Giuseppe Verdi, who was looking for a tenor for an international tour of his Requiem. Verdi accepted Masini in early 1875, and personally trained him for his part. The tour included performances in Paris, London, Vienna, Venice and Florence. Masini and Verdi later returned to Paris and appeared together in Verdi's Aida (with Verdi as a conductor) at the Théâtre des Italiens, where the theatre's box office realized the highest numbers in its history.

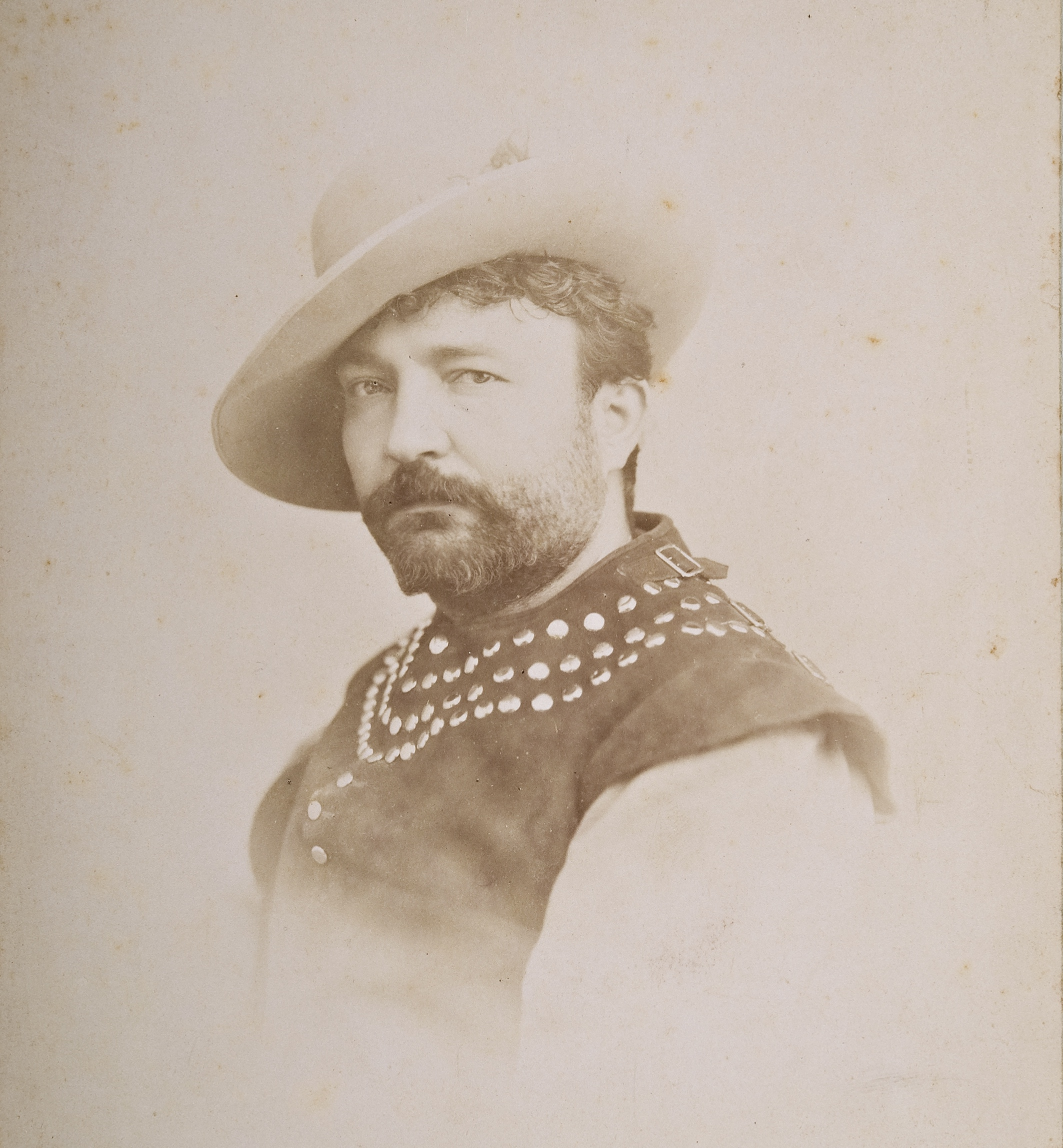
Angelo Masini as the Duke in Verdi's Rigoletto

In September 1876, Masini made his Russian debut at the Mariinsky Theatre in Saint Petersburg as Radamès in Verdi's Aida. He sang at the Bolshoi Theatre in Moscow. Russia was to become his artistic home and the center of his activities until the end of his career. From this point on, Masini very rarely performed in Italy.

Among his admirers in Russia were the Czar, and composer Pyotr Ilyich Tchaikovsky, who frequently praised Masini's ability to blend power with a delicate 'sfumato' technique.

From 1878 to 1881, he primarily sang at Saint Petersburg, but he also appeared at Warsaw, Paris, Vienna and Monte Carlo. He was also scheduled to sing the title-role of Gounod's Faust in London, but cancelled after a dispute with impresario James Mapleson.

In 1881, he sang at the Teatro del Liceu in Barcelona for the first time. The Teatro Real in Madrid offered him a seven-year contract with a large fee, so he withdrew temporarily from Russia and stayed in Spain until 1887.

Starting in 1888, Masini again focused his career mostly in Russia. In total, he sang there for a total of 43 seasons from 1876 to 1905. He also toured South America in 1887 and 1889.

In the mid 1890s, he was also sought after by Verdi to create the role of Fenton in his last opera, Falstaff. Unfortunately, Masini had become difficult to work with at this stage of his career (mostly bouts of divismo behavior), and Verdi opted for Edoardo Garbin instead, even though he was not entirely satisfied with his performance.

By 1895, his voice had begun to decline. Nonetheless, he continued to perform for another 10 years until his final stage appearance in Paris as Almaviva in Rossini's The Barber of Seville, opposite a young Titta Ruffo as Figaro.

== Retirement, later life and death ==
After retiring from the stage, Masini went back to his hometown of Forlì and dedicated his life mostly to farming. He occasionally coached young singers, such as when Luigi Carbone, the first teacher of tenor Enrico Caruso, reached out to Masini for help in building Caruso's voice. Masini, along with Carbone, taught several arias to the young Caruso and gave him advice on how to better use his voice.

He was also known for instances of generosity, such as when he donated 100,000 lire to the construction of a monument dedicated to Aurelio Saffi, and when he contributed half a million lyre to help found the Casa di Riposo per Musicisti in Milan. He also donated the same amount of money to several charities.

Angelo Masini died in Forli on September 28, 1926 at the age of 82.

== Recordings ==
Despite erroneous claims that Masini never recorded, he was confirmed to have recorded his voice on wax cylinders in Russia at the insistence of his friend, composer and pianist Anton Rubinstein. These recordings were broadcast on Russian radio on the first decades of the 20th century, but have since disappeared after World War II. At present, it is not known what became of them.

Masini is also known to have visited the Milan studios of the Gramophone Company, as confirmed by a letter written by Alfred Michaëlis, the Milan agent of the Gramophone Company, to the company's founder, W.B Owen: "This morning at 11 o-clock, Masini will come here". Masini arrived at the studio on the morning of April 6, 1903 to explore the possibility of a recording contract, but his fee of £0.20 per disc was considered absurd and the deal did not proceed. There is a prevailing theory that Masini recorded a test pressing before negotiations got sour. That test pressing, a recording of the aria "Niun mi tema" from Verdi's Otello, had been previously attributed to Spanish tenor Antonio Aramburo, but that attribution was disproven when Aramburo's real recordings were eventually found. Italian conductor Carlo Sabajno confirmed that Masini did in fact record at least one test pressing in his life, but prohibited its release.
