= Intendant (disambiguation) =

Intendant may refer to:

- Theater manager, the administrator and often also artistic director of a theater
- Opera manager, the administrator and often also artistic director of an opera house
- Public officials especially in non-English-speaking countries called "intendants" in English
- (In German) director general, managing director, and artistic director of a public broadcasting company, concert hall, orchestra, festival, or similar cultural institution
