= Johanna Jachmann-Wagner =

German opera singer

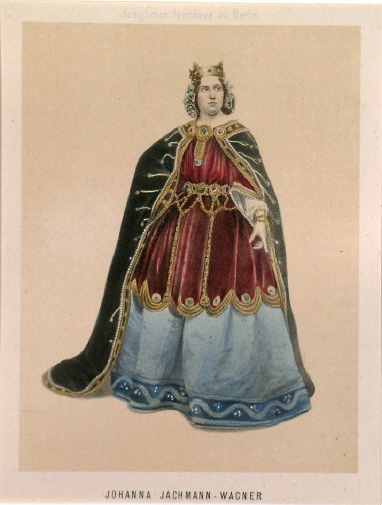
Johanna Jachmann-Wagner, as Ortrud in the opera Lohengrin by Richard Wagner, c. 1860

Johanna Jachmann-Wagner or Johanna Wagner (13 October 1828 – 16 October 1894) was a mezzo-soprano singer, tragédienne in theatrical drama, and teacher of singing and theatrical performance who won great distinction in Europe during the third quarter of the 19th century. She was a niece of the composer Richard Wagner and was the original performer, and in some respects the inspiration, of the character of Elisabeth in Tannhäuser. She was also the original intended performer of Brünnhilde in Der Ring des Nibelungen, but in the event assumed other roles.

== Early career ==
Johanna Wagner was born in Seelze, Hanover. She was the natural daughter of a soldier named Bock von Wülfingen, and was adopted by Albert Wagner (1799–1874) (eldest brother of Richard) and his wife Elise (1800–1864). They had two other daughters. From Seelze the family moved to Würzburg in 1830, where both parents worked in the Royal Bavarian Theatre, father being an actor, singer and stage-manager. She received piano lessons from her mother, a Roman Catholic, and sang duets with the Landgräfin of Hessen, who took singing lessons from her father. Richard Wagner visited in 1833 (while composing Die Feen) and often accompanied her singing Carl Loewe's ballad "Edward". Johanna knew the young Marie Seebach (later wife of Wagnerian singer Albert Niemann), who attended the same confirmation class.

She showed aptitude for the stage as a child. Owing to poor health she went to stay with her aunt Christine Gley, a singer and mother of the Vienna actress Julie Rettich (1809–1866). In 1842 she accepted a contract as actress at Bernburg and Ballenstedt, and her father undertook her training as a singer. After appearing as a page in the new opera Les Huguenots at Ballenstedt, she began to give concerts with much success. In Bernburg she gained favourable notice by standing in to take the role of Marguerite de Valois in a performance attended by Duke Leopold.

The managing director moved his company to Halle during the summer, and Johanna studied Friedrich Schiller roles for the theatre, and operatic roles with her father in Daniel Auber's Maurer und Schlosser, Albert Lortzing's Der Wildschütz and in Don Giovanni. Her first important operatic appearance was as Catherina Cornaro in Fromental Halévy's La reine de Chypre. In May 1844 Richard Wagner arranged an audition for her at the Dresden Royal Opera, where she gave guest appearances in these operas and received a three-year contract, being engaged as a Royal Saxon Kammersängerin before the age of 18.

== Dresden and Paris ==
At the time of her arrival in 1844, Dresden had recently witnessed the world premieres of Rienzi (1842) and Der fliegende Holländer (1843), and the singers Josef Tichatschek (tenor, the first Rienzi)), the baritone Anton Mitterwurzer, bass Wilhelm Georg Dettmer, and the celebrated dramatic soprano Wilhelmine Schröder-Devrient (the original Adriano and Senta) were the principals with whom she worked. The latter (whom Johanna had first met in Ballenstedt) was an especially inspiring example, and Tichatschek became a lifelong friend. She also befriended Ferdinand Heine, an actor with great knowledge of theatrical costume, and Countess Helene Kaminska, who made several portraits of her.

Johanna studied several roles with her uncle, especially Irene in Rienzi, and as her family moved to the city they became part of Richard Wagner's circle there. As he was now composing Tannhäuser, following his new musical conceptions, Johanna and Tichatschek sang the music of Elisabeth and Tannhäuser for him as it evolved. He had intended to premiere the opera to mark her 17th birthday, 13 October 1845, but she was ill, which forced its postponement for six days. The first performance, on 19 October, a six-hour staging beside Devrient as Venus, and with Dettmer and Mitterwurzer, was followed by a shortened version, with altogether eight repeats by the following January.

In 1846, after singing excerpts from Christoph Willibald Gluck's Orpheus in concert, with financial support from the King of Saxony she left for Paris to study with Manuel Patricio Rodríguez García (and/or with Pauline García-Viardot) for whom she sang Agathe's first aria in Der Freischütz to audition. After hearing Giulia Grisi as Norma she studied the role with him (in Italian), and also Valentine in Les Huguenots (in French), though his attempt to teach her Rosina met with less success. He suggested she should sing in Paris: she declined, but while there she saw Frédéric Chopin play, saw Rachel as Jean Racine's Phèdre, and Habeneck conduct Ludwig van Beethoven's 7th Symphony. At the end of the year she returned to Dresden, to perform Norma and Valentine, under a new contract.

== Hamburg, Berlin and touring ==
The Dresden revolution of 1848/49, which resulted in Richard Wagner's exile and Mme Schröder-Devrient's temporary imprisonment, found Johanna singing in Hamburg, as Valentine and Leonore. Dresden vacillated so she accepted a contract at Hamburg where, as Fides in Le prophète she attracted Giacomo Meyerbeer's attention. He brought her to Berlin State Opera to sing it for her début there in May 1851, which she followed (June 1851) with Donna Anna, Reiza and a repeat of Fides. She also sang Fides in Vienna in 1850. Her Hamburg obligations discharged, she brought her famous interpretation of Bellini's Romeo to Berlin with great success.

In May 1852 Johanna accepted an invitation from Benjamin Lumley to sing at Her Majesty's Theatre in London. However the Royal Opera House management (Frederick Gye) sought to tempt her away, an offer which Albert Wagner (always Johanna's agent) accepted. In the ensuing row, including two famous lawsuits and equitable proceedings – Lumley v Gye and Lumley v Wagner – Albert Wagner offended H. F. Chorley and others by a widely quoted remark (from private correspondence which was produced in court) that "one only could go to England to get money": and Johanna went home without singing at all. However she returned in June and July 1856 (to Her Majesty's) and appeared repeatedly in her best roles, beginning (14 June) as Romeo, and then in Lucrezia Borgia, Gluck's Orfeo ed Euridice and Gioachino Rossini's Tancredi. She gave a Court concert, after which Queen Victoria broke her rule and attended this theatre to hear her on stage.

In 1856 she sang in Weimar under Franz Liszt's direction, as Orfeo, Romeo, Lucrezia Borgia, in Gluck's Iphigénie en Tauride, and in concert. After a Romeo she was given a standing ovation by the orchestra and crowned with a laurel wreath, and she had to give repeat performances for the Grand Duke and Duchess. Liszt, whose interest was not only musical, presented her with his portrait. Throughout the 1850s she sang repeatedly at Cologne, and at Stettin. In 1858 she made a debut at Leipzig, as Lucrezia, and performed Romeo, Tancredi, Tannhäuser and Orfeo, before going on to Dresden, where she rejoiced to sing Tannhäuser again with Tichatschek and Mitterwurzer.

Wagner, not then on friendly terms with Johanna, had intended her for his Brünnhilde in early plans for the Nibelungen operas, but it was in Heinrich Dorn's opera Die Nibelungen at Berlin, during Richard's exile, that she performed the role of this name. She also made some effect in the little-known Macbeth of Wilhelm Taubert, as Lady Macbeth. However, it was in the Berlin premieres of Tannhäuser, in January 1856, that she rediscovered her place in Richard's pantheon, with such success that permission was also granted for the (belated) first Berlin production of Lohengrin in 1859, with Johanna as Ortrud. She also trained Louise Harriers-Wippern as Elsa. For these productions Botho von Hülsen was the manager, Albert Wagner the stage-manager and (in Lohengrin) Wilhelm Taubert the conductor.

== A new career ==
In May 1859 Johanna married Alfred Jachmann of Königsberg, diplomat, of an eminent Prussian family whom she had assisted financially at the collapse of their interests in 1858. Her first daughter was born in March 1860. After a very busy and triumphant tour of German towns in 1860 and a visit to Warsaw in rebellion (where she was first hissed, and then sang under police protection), she decided to make her farewell from the opera stage and to continue her career as a tragédienne. Her contract renegotiated, she studied the role of Johann Wolfgang von Goethe's Iphigenie under the guidance of Auguste Crelinger, the actress whose mantle she was to inherit, and performed it in September 1861 at the Royal Theatre, Berlin, for Queen Augusta's birthday, and soon afterwards was Friedrich Schiller's Mary Stuart, and Countess Orsina in Emilia Galotti.

She now took the name Johanna Jachmann-Wagner for her new career. She was soon compared to Fanny Janauschek, the dramatic power of her performances giving hope of a rebirth of the German classic drama. Having sung at the coronation concert at Königsberg, her operatic farewell was as Orfeo in December 1861, but she repeated it at a centenary performance in October 1862. She did however continue to sing in various German towns through the 1860s, notably in concert and recital, in the performance of lieder. She made a return visit to Würzburg in 1866. From 1861 to 1869 she lived part of each year at Berlin and part at Trutenau. In 1868 and 1869 she gave the first performances of two dramas, Phädra and Catharina Voisin by "Georg Conrad", the pen-name of Prince George of Prussia. Her performances as Goethe's Iphigenie and in the classical drama, as Phädra and (Sophocles') Antigone became particularly her own. Her retirement became necessary after a paralysis of one side of her face, which occurred in 1869. After her dramatic farewells in 1871 and 1872, eulogised by Theodor Fontane, she was awarded a gold medal by the Emperor.

== Bayreuth and after ==
In May 1872 Johanna fulfilled a promise to her uncle Richard Wagner, singing alto in the solo quartet in the performance of Beethoven's 9th Symphony at the foundation-stone laying of the Bayreuth Festspielhaus. She also participated in the first Bayreuth Festival of 1876, taking the role of Schwertleite in Die Walküre and First Norn in Götterdämmerung in the original first full production of Der Ring des Nibelungen. She was not now capable of Brünnhild as originally intended, but as the Valkyr, her dramatic control of the scenes, and the energy she infused into them, in rehearsal and performance, realised the composer's true intentions, and set a precedent which was later imitated. Her Norn similarly was invested with her full dramatic resources.

Alfred Jachmann's fortune crashed again after the Franco-Prussian War, and at Würzburg Johanna, with her pension from the Berlin Hochspielhaus, continued her work as a singing teacher, and retained the friendship of kings and princes which she had long held. Her last public performance was at Würzburg in scenes from Orfeo in 1882. She moved then to Munich, where, in close contact with the Royal Court Theatre, she accepted the post of instructor in singing at the Royal Conservatoire of Music and the title Professor. Ludwig II of Bavaria presented her with a free seat in the Munich opera, and invited her to a private performance of Parsifal in his own theatre. She had many pupils, but, eventually dissatisfied with Munich, she returned to Berlin in 1888 and continued to teach, arranging public concerts for her pupils. She died in Würzburg of heart illness three days after her 66th birthday.

== Descriptions of her voice ==
A London reviewer is quoted to have written, "Her range comprises the soft female loveliness of a soprano and is equally fine in the low tones of a contralto. On each occasion that a peculiarly fine change from one range to another was accomplished by this incomparable singer the effect was as overwhelming as it was unexpected... Deceit, passion, love, fear and despair were expressed in each note." Another is quoted: "She is one of those rare artists who fills the stage with her attractive personality. ... her voice is one of the rarest beauty. One feels inclined to say that she is a soprano, but her range is so wide that the full tone covers three registers, from the high soprano to the alto range. Certainly no living singer can be compared in fullness of tone to Johanna Wagner."

H.F. Chorley, embittered by Albert Wagner's national insult, found little to like in Johanna: "Considered as a singer, the claims of Mademoiselle Wagner were very meagre. She must have had originally a fine mezzo soprano voice. She can never have learned how to produce, or how to use it. Whether as Romeo, or Tancredi, or Lucrezia Borgia, the insubordinate toughness of the organ could not be concealed. Though she dashed at every difficulty, with an intrepidity only to be found in German singers, none was, in very deed, mastered.' Chorley, however, had no liking for German stagecraft, which he considered mannered and formulaic, nor for German theatrical singing, which he called "tasteless declamation accompanied by an orchestra".

On the other hand, Benjamin Lumley wrote of her 1856 appearance as Romeo in terms that make one imagine the Brünnhilde she ought to have been: "She appeared: tall, stately, self-possessed, clothed in glittering gilded mail, with her fine fair hair flung in masses upon her neck: a superb air that seemed to give full earnest of victory, and a step revealing innate majesty and grandeur in every movement... She sang! The sonorous voice, which heralded the mission of the young warrior to his enemies, rang through the house as penetrating and awakening as the summons of a clarion."

== Bibliography ==
- Jachmann, H. (Trechman, M. A. (translator)) Wagner and his first Elisabeth London: Novello & Co, 1944.
- Grove, George, ed. (1889). A Dictionary of Music and Musicians (A.D. 1450-1880) by Eminent Writers, English and Foreign, Volume 4. London: Macmillan., see also The New Grove Dictionary of Music and Musicians
