= Leila; or, The Siege of Granada =

1838 historical romance novel by Edward Bulwer-Lytton

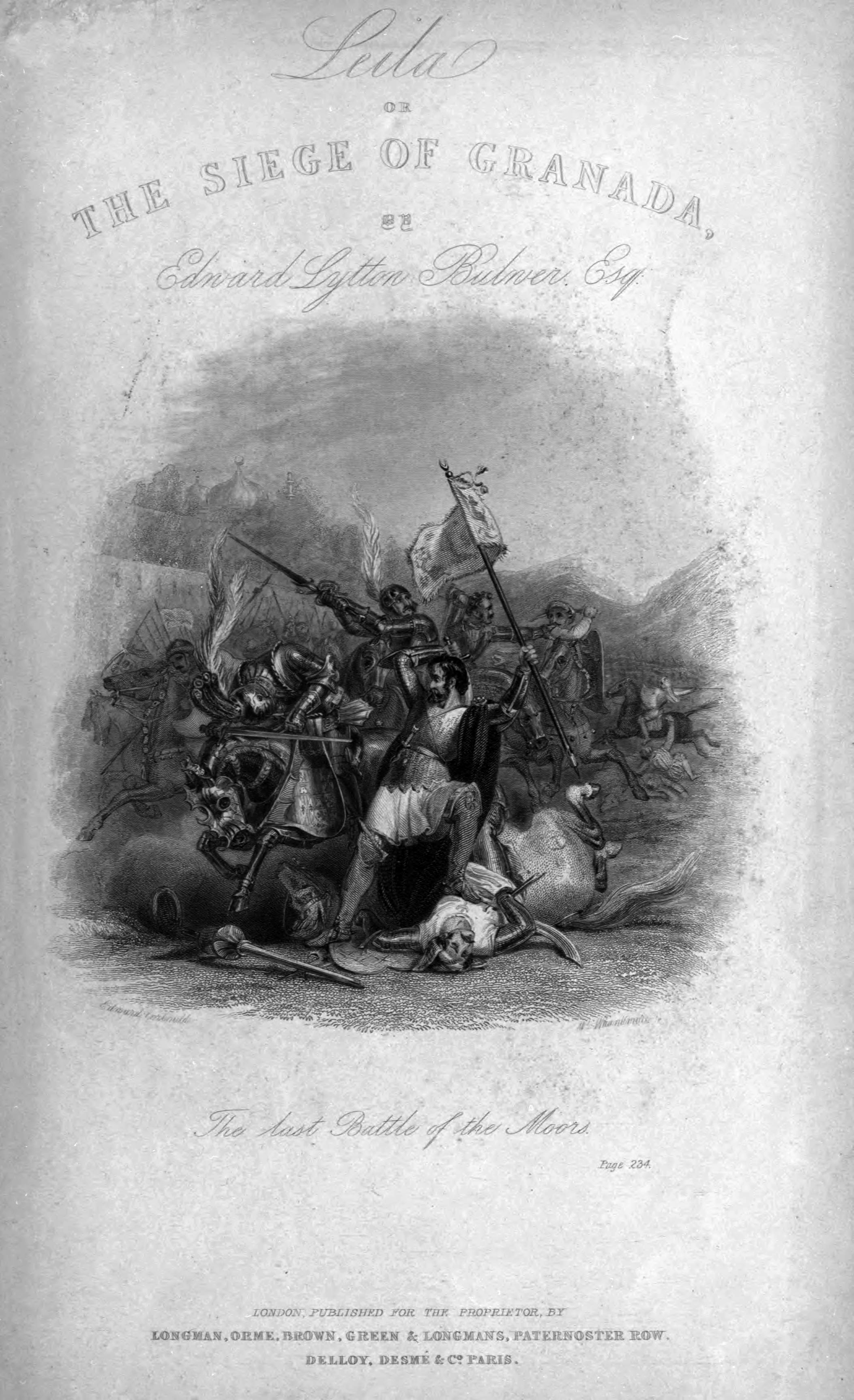
Frontispiece to the first edition

Leila; or, The Siege of Granada is a historical romance novel by Edward Bulwer-Lytton published in 1838.

The novel is set in Granada, Spain at the end of the Middle Ages — beginning in the summer of 1491. It was originally published in an expensive form, with many engraved illustrations. The preface to the 1860 edition explains that the novel has been less popular than his other works of fiction due to the prejudice against literary works that are thought to owe their value, in part, to the illustrations.

In 1855, Giuseppe Apolloni based his opera L'ebreo on this novel.

== Plot ==
In Leila, as the double title suggests, there is a double storyline: the domestic story of the daughter (Leila) and the public story of the nation. Leila's father, Almamen, switches allegiances between Christian and Moor in what eventually becomes the famous Siege of Granada. Almamen attempts to guard his daughter's Jewish heritage by keeping her away from her Moorish lover, Muza. He inadvertently delivers her into the hands of the Christian monarchs, and Leila is subjected to the procedures of conversion by the queen's intermediary, Donna Inez. In the double story line, the conquest of Muslim Granada runs parallel to the conversion of the Jewish Leila. The characters meet at the altar of a convent in which Leila is about to take her vows as a nun, and her father kills her. The domestic plot parallels the Christianization of Spain.
