= Giuseppe Del Puente =

Italian opera singer (1841–1900)

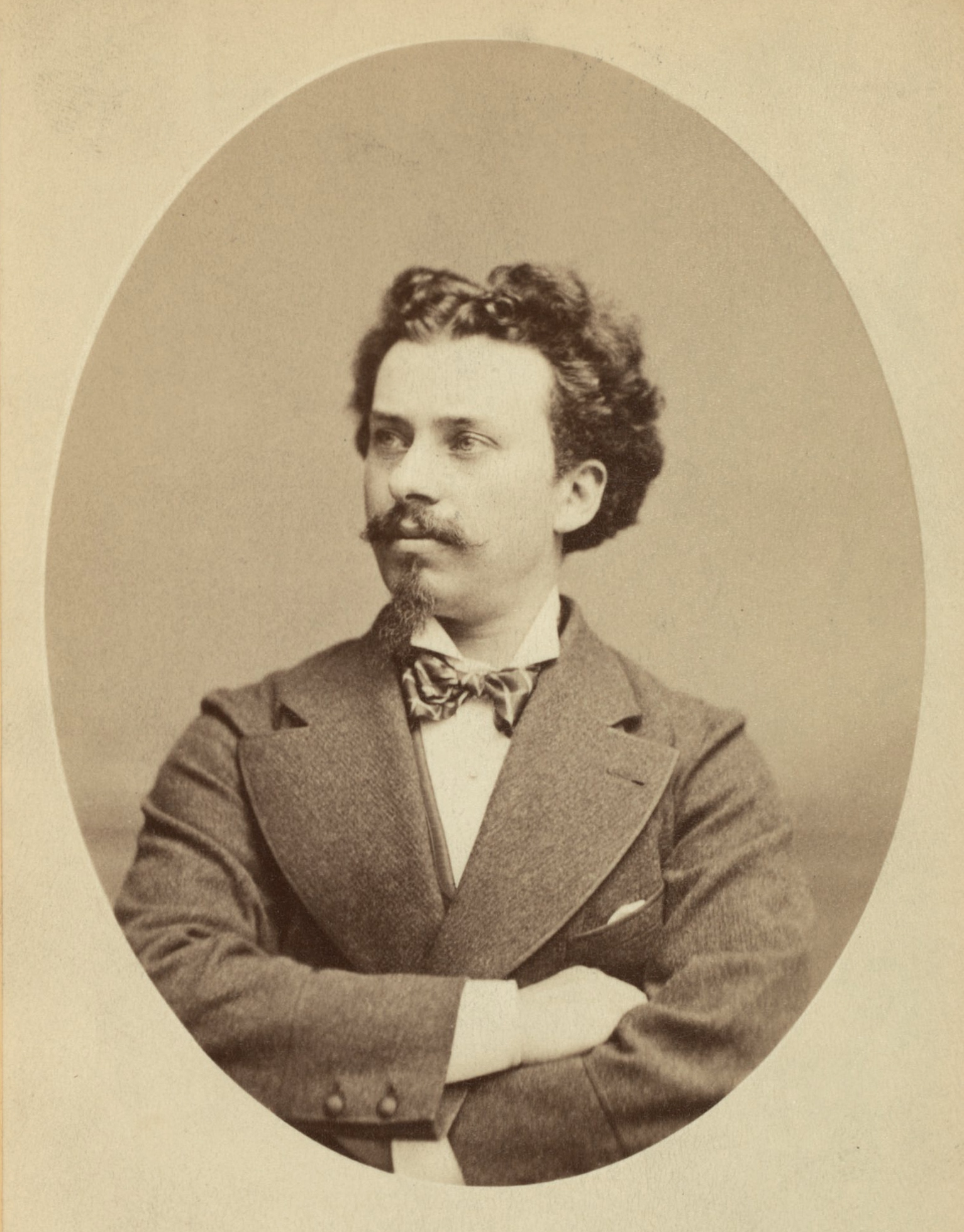
- Giuseppe Del Puente circa 1870
- Born: Giuseppe Camillo Carlo Del Puente; January 30, 1841; Naples, Kingdom of the Two Sicilies
- Died: May 25, 1900 (aged 59); Philadelphia, Pennsylvania, U.S.
- Resting place: West Laurel Hill Cemetery, Bala Cynwyd, Pennsylvania, U.S.
- Education: Conservatory of San Pietro a Majella
- Occupations: Operatic baritone Voice teacher
- Years active: 1866–1900
- Spouses: Luisa Borghi; Helen Dudley Campbell
- Children: 2

Giuseppe Del Puente (January 30, 1841 – May 25, 1900) was an Italian baritone operatic singer and educator. He performed in over 60 operas throughout Europe and the United States. He was the first performer of many standard-repertory baritone roles in the United States and part of the cast of the inaugural performance of the Metropolitan Opera in 1883. He opened the Verdi School in Philadelphia in 1893 and worked as a singing instructor.

== Early life and education ==
Giuseppe Camillo Carlo Del Puente was born January 30, 1841, in Naples, Italy. From a noble family of Spanish origin, Giuseppe eventually inherited the title Marquis de Murcia. Del Puente began his studies at the Conservatory of San Pietro a Majella as a young boy, originally devoting himself to cello under Gaetano Ciandelli. Upon discovering a fine baritone voice, he studied singing under Alfonso Guercia and Domenico Scafati, himself a student of Alessandro Busti and the castrato Girolamo Crescentini. When at age 17 he joined Garibaldi's army and obtained the rank of sergeant. His voice was still that of a soprano, and after a year in the army, he returned to the Conservatory. By this point his voice had changed to what he thought was that of a tenor. But it dropped still lower, until it seemed to even out at a baritone. It was with that voice that he finished his musical studies over the course of two years.

== Career ==
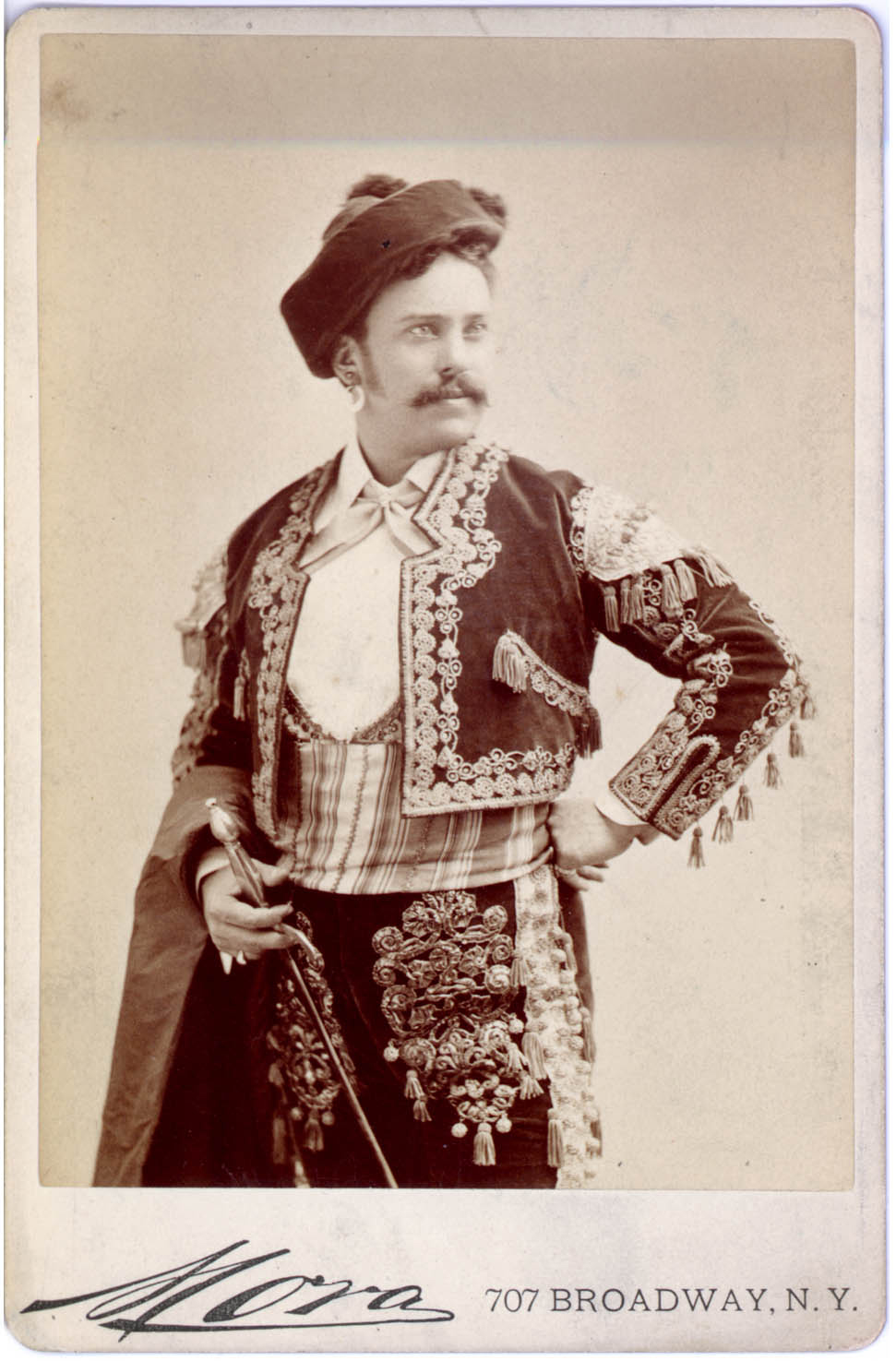
19th century Italian baritone Giuseppe Del Puente in costume as the toreador Escamillo in Carmen

He sang for several years in Russia and made his operatic debut at Iași, Romania alongside tenor Italo Campanini. He sang at many courts and the leading theaters in Europe, such as Apollo, Rome; La Scala, Milan; San Carlo, Naples; and others in France, Germany, Russia, and Spain. In London, he made his debut at the Royal Opera House in 1873. He made an impression on Maurice Strakosch, brother-in-law of the star soprano Adelina Patti, who engaged him for his own company in 1873 and later took him to the United States. Del Puente made his debut there in 1874 at the New York Academy of Music.

From 1875 to 1882 he toured with Col. Mapleson's company and the Nilsson Concert Troupe. Just as Mapleson's fortunes began to decline, Henry Abbey offering higher fees to some Mapleson's artists, including Del Puente, was able to lure them away to his company for the inaugural season of the Metropolitan Opera. He performed as Valentin in Faust on October 22, 1883. He remained with the Metropolitan Opera for the seasons of 1883-1884, 1891-1892, and 1894-1895.

Del Puente was a part of numerous operatic premieres. He sang his most famous role, Escamillo, in the London and American premieres of Carmen in 1878. At the Met, Del Puente created the roles of Barnaba and Alfio in the American premieres of La Gioconda and Cavalleria rusticana, respectively and being the leading baritone of the company, participated in several Met premieres of standard repertoire: Mignon, La traviata, Barbiere di Siviglia, Les Huguenots, and Carmen. At Philadelphia, he created roles in the American premieres of Les pécheurs des perles, L'amico Fritz, and Manon Lescaut. He sang Mercutio in the American premiere of Roméo et Juliette (with Patti) for the inauguration of the Chicago Auditorium Theater on December 10, 1889. He sang in the London premiere of La forza del destino, as well as its American premiere at the New York Academy of Music with Campanini. He sang Iago in the first American success of Verdi's Otello, alongside Francesco Tamagno in his American debut.

In addition to his operatic and concert work, he was also singing teacher, opening a studio in 1893 under the name Verdi School in Philadelphia. Among his students were the composer Joseph Carl Breil and John Hay McCrystal (known professionally as J.H. Duval, teacher of singing and author of The Secrets of Svengali and Svengali's Secrets and Memoirs of the Golden Age). He also compiled a written work, Progressive Exercises in Vocalization, divided into two parts—Exercises in Sustained Singing and Exercises in Flexibility and Execution. This work was advertised publisher Theodore Presser in Etude magazine, but no copy has yet been found.

Del Puente's final Met performance was February 2, 1895, in the role of Don Giovanni, and his last stage performance was 1898 in Philadelphia in the role of Rigoletto.

In addition to the more than 60 roles in his repertoire, Del Puente did a great deal of work as a concert singer.

== Voice and style ==
A thorough description of Del Puente's voice and versatility comes from J.H. Duval:

I have said that the greatest artists only absolutely surpasses in a few roles, yet Del Puente sang all the roles a baritone could sing. He surpassed in some, was Splendid in all. His grand ringing tones of such astounding beauty, richness and sonority could be modulated down to be just right for Alfonso in La favorita or any other Bel Canto role. I have never heard him equalled Rossini's Barbiere, Meyerbeer's Nelusko in L'africana, the Count in Le nozze di Figaro, Amonasro in Aida, nor even approached in Il trovatore, or Carmen (Italian version). As Don Giovanni he was second only to Maurel. As Rigoletto it was a matter of taste between those two baritones. Maurel's had more surprising effects, and Del Puente's passion and voice swept everything before him. As a gentleman he was unique and always proclaimed Maurel was a greater artist than he, "except in Rigoletto".

His voice was often described as "orotund" and a "full, round baritone of very musical quality". Duval, a voice teacher himself, describes it with more detail:

A baritone voice being between a center and the bass is apt to lean toward one or the other in quality. Del Puente had all the depth and range of both a high baritone and a bass-baritone and a wonderful ring all over its compass—a round rich ring with nothing of a thin or tenorish quality in any part of it.

The largest opera houses gave him not the slightest trouble to fill, with an ocean of sound of richest colors.

I have never heard such a voice—so thrilling so intoxicatingly beautiful.

== Personal life ==
Del Puente's first wife was mezzo-soprano Luisa Borghi (1834 – October 1, 1886), with whom he had a daughter, Amelia Speranza Angelina Vincenza Del Puente, born July 16, 1866, in Botoșani, Romania. His second wife was Italian dancer and harpist Emma Trevisan, coming from a Venetian noble family; they married in Milan on January 6, 1887. His third wife was contralto Helen Dudley Campbell. Their son, Joseph Del Puente (born August 27, 1892), later sang as a baritone in musical theater.

Giuseppe Del Puente died of apoplexy on May 25, 1900, at his home in Philadelphia. He was buried at West Laurel Hill Cemetery in a grave that was unmarked until 1964, when opera enthusiast Leopold Saltzman discovered it and built a memorial.
