= Alwina Valleria =

American opera singer (1848–1925)

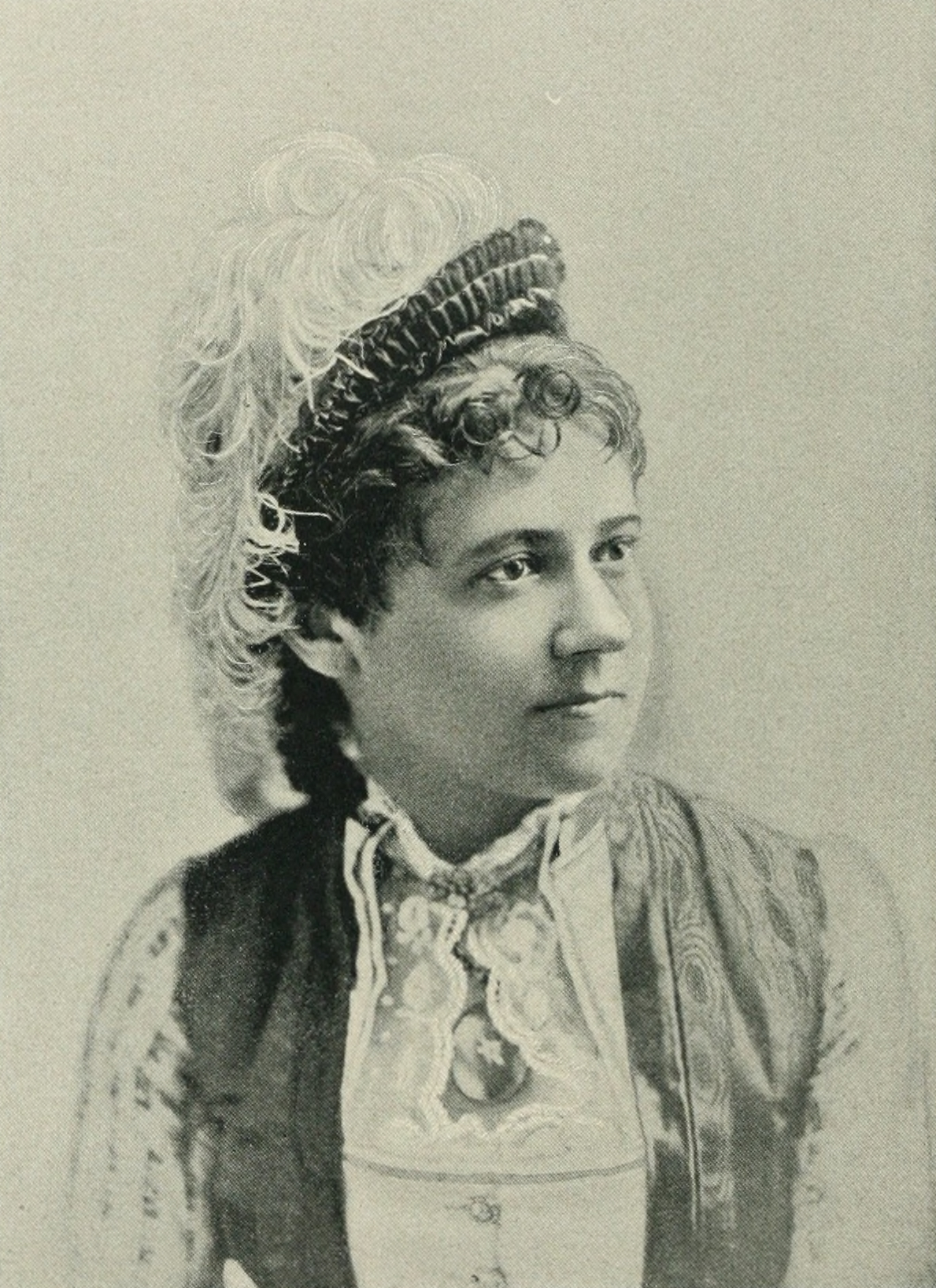
Alwina Valleria, operatic soprano

Alwina Valleria (October 12, 1848 – February 17, 1925) was an American-born soprano. She was the first American-born singer to appear in principal roles with the Metropolitan Opera.

Born Alwina Schoening in Baltimore, Valleria attended the Royal Academy of Music in London, making her operatic debut in 1871 in St. Petersburg. Following this she appeared in Germany and at La Scala, also singing at Drury Lane in London. A favorite with London audiences, she sang at Her Majesty's Theatre from 1877 until 1878, and appeared at Covent Garden from 1879 until 1882. Her American debut came at the Academy of Music on October 22, 1879, when she sang Marguerite in Charles Gounod's Faust with the James Henry Mapleson company. On October 26, 1883, she bowed at the Metropolitan Opera, as Leonora in Il trovatore. She was New York City's first Micaela in Carmen in 1878, also creating the role for London. In 1884, she joined the Carl Rosa Opera Company, performing in the world premieres of Alexander Mackenzie's The Troubadour and Nadeshda by Arthur Thomas.

Valleria retired from the stage in 1886. She died in Nice in 1925.
