= Ernst von Hesse-Wartegg =

Austrian-American writer and traveler

Ernst von Hesse-Wartegg (21 February 1851 – 17 May 1918) was an Austrian–American writer and traveller. He was consul of Venezuela in Switzerland (1888–1918). He completed 29 books and close to 700 journal articles.

== Biography ==
Ernst von Hesse-Wartegg's origins are unknown, but he was thought to have been born in or near Vienna, Austrian Empire. He had a daughter born out of wedlock who tried in vain to prove her family roots in the 1930s. In 2012 several research teams could not find more information, only in results published in 2017 it was demonstrated that Hesse-Wartegg was Austrian by birth, but adopted American citizenship in 1887. In 1878, he married the American opera singer Minnie Hauk (1851–1929). Starting 1889 they lived in their villa in Tribschen, near Lucerne, Switzerland.

Throughout his life he went on travels worldwide. In 1872 he went to South-Eastern Europe, 1876 was his first trip to the US. Trips in the years 1880 to Tunis, 1881 to Egypt, and 1883 to Canada and Mexico followed, as well as several trips to the US. His next important travels were 1887 to Venezuela, and 1892 to Morocco and Spain. In 1894 he went on a trip around the world with South and East Asia as major stops: India, Singapore, Hong-Kong, China, Japan and Korea. In 1898 he was back to China. A trip to the German colonies in the Pacific followed in 1900, and in 1901 he travelled to India and Ceylon. His last long trips were to Brazil in the years 1903, 1910 and 1913. He died at Tribschen, near Lucerne, Switzerland.

Mark Twain and Karl May, amongst others, borrowed from his geographical descriptions for their own works.

== Works (selection) ==
- Die Werkzeugmaschinen zur Metall- und Holzbearbeitung. Leipzig 1874
- Der unterseeische Tunnel zwischen England und Frankreich. Leipzig 1875
- Atlantische Seebäder. Vienna 1878
- Prairiefahrten. Leipzig 1878
- Nord-Amerika, seine Städte und Naturwunder, sein Land und seine Leute, Leipzig 1880
- Mississippifahrten. Leipzig 1881
- Tunis, Land und Leute. Vienna 1882; Wuppertal 2007 ISBN 978-3-8370-0729-9
- Canada und Neufundland. Freiburg im Breisgau 1888
- Mexiko, Land und Leute. Wien 1890
- Tausend und ein Tag im Occident. 3 Bde. Dresden 1896
- Die Einheitszeit nach Studenzonen. Dresden 1892
- Chicago, eine Großstadt im amerikanischen Westen. Stuttgart 1892
- Curiosa aus der Neuen Welt. Leipzig 1893
- Andalusien. Leipzig 1894
- Korea. Dresden 1895
- China und Japan. Leipzig 1897
- Schan-tung und Deutsch-China. Leipzig 1897
- Siam, das Reich des weißen Elefanten. Leipzig 1899
- Samoa, Bismarckarchipel und Neuguinea. Leipzig: J. J. Weber. 1902.
- Indien und seine Fürstenhöfe. Leipzig 1906
- Die Wunder der Welt. 1912
- Zwischen Anden und Amazonas. Stuttgart 1915
- Die Balkanstaaten und ihre Völker. Regensburg 1917

== Works in English (selection) ==
- The caravan route between Egypt and Syria. By Ludwig Salvator, translated by Ernst von Hesse-Wartegg. 1881.
- Tunis. The Land and the People. London, New York 1882
- The New South-West. Travelling Sketches from Kansas, New Mexico, Arizona and Northern Mexico. London. 1883.
- Across Nebraska by Train in 1877. Translated by Frederic Trautmann. 1984
- Travels on the Lower Mississippi 1879–1880. Translated by Frederic Trautmann. Columbia. 1990

== Works in Danish (selection) ==
- Nordamerika på Kryds og Tvers – Skildringer fra nutiden – 1892 Nordstjernens Hovedekspedition

== See also ==
- List of Austrian writers
