= Involuntary servitude =

Legal term which may constitute slavery

Involuntary servitude is a legal and constitutional term for a person laboring against that person's will to benefit another, under some form of coercion, to which it may constitute slavery. While labouring to benefit another is generally synonymous with the condition of slavery, involuntary servitude does not necessarily connote the complete lack of freedom experienced in chattel slavery; involuntary servitude may also refer to other forms of unfree labour. Involuntary servitude is not dependent upon compensation or its amount. Prison labour is often referred to as involuntary servitude. Prisoners are forced to work for free or for very little money while they carry out their time in the system.

== Jurisdictions ==
=== Malaysia ===
The Constitution of Malaysia, Part II, article 6, states:

1. No person shall be held in slavery.
2. All forms of forced labour are prohibited, but Parliament may by law provide for compulsory service for national purposes.
3. Work incidental to the serving of a sentence of imprisonment imposed by a court of law shall not be taken to be forced labour within the meaning of this Article.
4. Where by any written law the whole or any part of the functions of any public authority is to be carried on by another public authority, for the purpose of enabling those functions to be performed the employees of the first mentioned public authority shall be bound to serve the second mentioned public authority shall not be taken to be forced labour within the meaning of this Article, and no such employee shall be entitled to demand any right from either the first mentioned or the second mentioned public authority by reason of the transfer of his employment.

=== Philippines ===
The Constitution of the Philippines, article III, section 18, states that "No involuntary servitude in any form shall exist except as a punishment for a crime whereof the party shall have been duly convicted."

=== United States ===
The Thirteenth Amendment to the United States Constitution makes involuntary servitude illegal under any U.S. jurisdiction whether at the hands of the government or in the private sphere, except as punishment for a crime:

Neither slavery nor involuntary servitude, except as a punishment for crime whereof the party shall have been duly convicted, shall exist within the United States, or any place subject to their jurisdiction.

The Supreme Court has held, in Butler v. Perry (1916), that the Thirteenth Amendment does not prohibit "enforcement of those duties which individuals owe to the state, such as services in the army, militia, on the jury, etc." Onerous long term alimony and spousal support orders, premised on a proprietary interest retained by former marital partners in one another's persons, have also been allowed in many states, though they may in practice embody features of involuntary servitude.

== Other interpretations of involuntary servitude ==
=== Abortion rights ===
Some have also argued that, should Roe v. Wade, 410 U.S. 113 (1973), be overturned by the United States Supreme Court, a constitutional right to abortion could still be sustained on the basis that denying it would subject women to involuntary servitude contrary to the Thirteenth Amendment. That decision was overturned in June of 2022, but it is unclear whether forced pregnancy and child-bearing are within the scope of the term "servitude".

=== Compulsory schooling ===
Some libertarians consider compulsory schooling involuntary servitude. John Taylor Gatto, a retired schoolteacher and libertarian activist critical of compulsory schooling writes of what he terms "The Cult Of Forced Schooling". Many libertarians consider income taxation a form of involuntary servitude. Republican Congressman Ron Paul has described income tax as "a form of involuntary servitude", and has written, "... things like Selective Service and the income tax make me wonder how serious we really are in defending just basic freedoms."

=== Military conscription ===
The Libertarian Party of the United States and other libertarians consider military conscription to be involuntary servitude in the sense of the Thirteenth Amendment. The U.S. Supreme Court disagreed with that interpretation in Arver v. United States, although it provided no justification for its contention that conscription did not constitute involuntary servitude.

== Law and economics ==
In contract theory, researchers have studied whether workers should be allowed to waive their right to quit work, or whether the right to quit should be inalienable. Suppose that at date 1 a worker voluntarily signs a labour contract according to which the worker has to perform a task at date 2. At date 2, the worker no longer wants to perform the task (see the English contract law case Lumley v Wagner for a classic example). Would it be a form of involuntary servitude if the worker were forced by the courts to fulfill the contractual duties? Müller and Schmitz (2021) have shown that from an economic efficiency point-of-view, in a static setting it can indeed be desirable to restrict the freedom of contract by making the right to quit inalienable. However, they also show that in a dynamic setting even the worker can be strictly better off when it is possible to contractually waive the right to quit.

== See also ==
- Civil conscription
- Cruel and unusual punishment
- Debt bondage
- Indentured servitude
- Peon
- Person
- Slavery
- Wage slavery
