= Louise Harriers-Wippern =

German operatic soprano

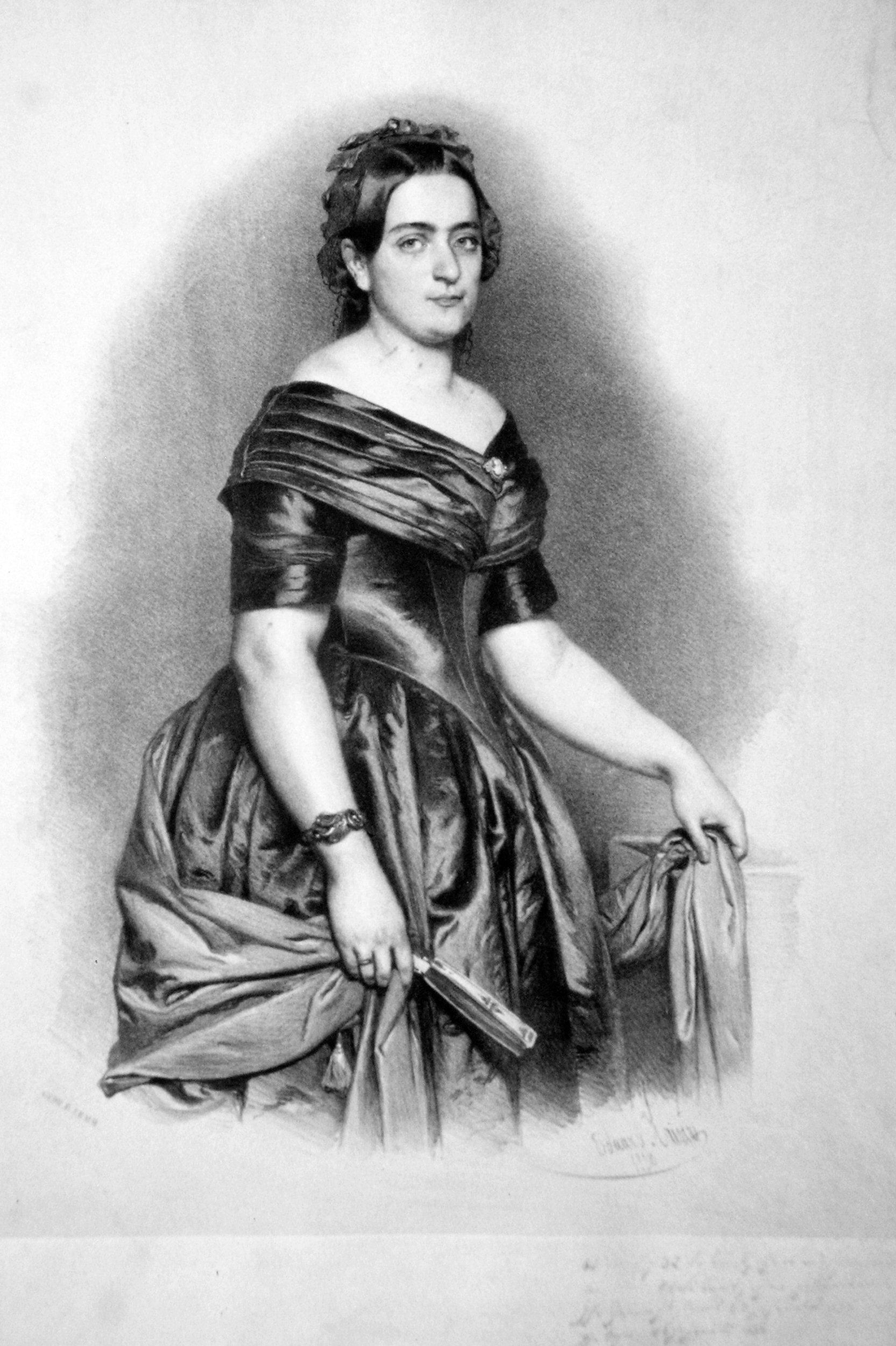
Lithograph by Eduard Kaiser (1858)

Louise Harriers-Wippern (28 February 1836 – 5 October 1878) was a German operatic soprano. She was a member of the company at the Royal Opera in Berlin, and appeared for three seasons in London.

== Life ==
Louise Wippern was born in Hildesheim in 1836, and was educated in the monastery in Duderstadt. From age 16 she sang solo parts at Hildesheim Cathedral, and afterwards had music lessons from Franziska Cornet in Hamburg. In June 1857 she made her first appearance at the Royal Opera House in Berlin, as Agatha in Weber's opera Der Freischütz, and later that month as Alice in Meyerbeer's Robert le diable; she was so successful as to obtain a permanent engagement in Berlin, beginning in September 1857 with these roles.

She kept the post until her retirement, and was a great favourite both in dramatic and in the lighter parts. Roles included the title role in Louis Spohr's Jessonda, Pamina in The Magic Flute, Fidelio by Beethoven, Inez in Meyerbeer's L'Africaine, the Princess of Navarre in Boieldieu's Jean de Paris, Mrs. Ankerstrom in Auber's Gustave III, Gretchen in Gounod's Faust, and Elizabeth in Tannhäuser by Wagner. In December 1859 she married at Bückeburg Eduard Harriers, an architect.

She sang for three seasons in London at Her Majesty's Theatre, first appearing in June 1864 as Alice in Robert le diable. She pleased "on account of the freshness of her tone, her firm delivery of the notes, her extreme earnestness and her unquestionable feeling" (The Musical World). Her parts in London were few: Pamina, Amelia in Auber's Un ballo in maschera, Leonora in Verdi's Il Trovatore, and Zerlina in Mozart's Don Giovanni; several of her best parts were in the hands of Thérèse Tietjens, then in the zenith of her fame and powers, and Louise Harriers Wippern was placed at great disadvantage.

In May 1868, while at Königsberg for a guest performance, she was taken ill with diphtheria. She reappeared at Berlin in January 1870, and sang there for a year or more, but her voice and strength were so much impaired that she was compelled to retire in 1871. She died in October 1878, from another throat disease, at the hydrotherapy establishment in Görbersdorf.
