= Opera management =

Opera management is the management of the processes by which opera is delivered to audiences. It is carried out by an opera manager, also called a general manager, managing director, or intendant (UK English). A multifaceted task, it involves managing an opera company, primarily the singers and musicians who perform the operas, but in many cases also involves managing the opera house in which the company performs.

== Background ==
Opera is a multi-faceted art form involving high fixed costs and requiring complex approaches to management. In addition to the singers and musicians who form the core of the company, its production requires scenery and costumes and sometimes dancers and non-singing actors. Fixed costs in today's opera organizations—keeping many of the singers and musicians on year-round contracts, and if managing their own theatre, the cost of workers needed to create and maintain the sets and costumes as well as the cost of maintaining and running the building—combined with the costs of individual productions, make opera the most expensive of the performing arts. However, even in the 19th century when opera was largely run by individual impresarios rather than large organisations, opera management as a profession was characterised as "a devouror of the fortunes of the victims it has tempted by its seductions". Musicologists and opera composers have noted that today “Marketing and private sector support are generally regarded as necessary despite the fact that many opera companies must simultaneously strive to attain public funding as ‘high art’ that embodies universally valuable cultural heritage.” Frederick Gye, who turned the Royal Italian Opera in Covent Garden into one of London's premiere opera houses in the 19th century, and who shaped the careers of many famous singers, described opera management as a "dreadful business".

== Venice and the development of opera as a business ==
The earliest operas were privately performed and financed by the noble families who commissioned them, often to mark great court occasions. One such example was Marco da Gagliano's La Flora, performed in 1628 at the Medici Palace in Florence to celebrate the marriage of Margherita de' Medici and Odoardo Farnese, Duke of Parma. Grand Duchess Maria Maddalena, the wife of Cosimo II de' Medici and the mother of the bride, took an active role in the planning of the production. She secured the services of the musicians and singers, attended the rehearsals, and according to musicologist Kelley Harness, may well have contributed to the development of the plot as well.

Publicly performed operas first appeared in Venice during the Carnival season of 1637. This was facilitated by the large number of public theatres already present in the city which originally served for the production of plays. They were built by noble families such as the Grimani, Tron, and Vendramin. The rebuilt Teatro San Cassiano, sponsored by the Tron family, was the first in the world specifically devoted to opera. Performances of L'Andromeda in 1637 by librettist Benedetto Ferrari and composer Francesco Manelli marked the theatre's first commercially produced opera. In the majority of cases the patrician Venetian owners profited from their theatres by renting them out to others who produced and managed the opera performances. The key figure in the actual production of the operas was the impresario, who assembled the singers, musicians and creative team and made the business and artistic decisions. Sometimes the impresarios were hired by the theatre renters and their backers. On other occasions the impresario was also one of the investors and the renter of the theatre. The cassier (cashier) was in charge the financial side of the production, including handling the payments and receipts. While the cassier was sometimes a separate member of the management team, in many instances the impresario also acted as the cassier. One of the most famous impresarios of the day was Marco Faustini who managed several Venetian opera houses in the course of his career.

== See also ==
- Arts administration
- Theater manager, also called general manager, managing director, or intendant (UK English)

== Notes and references ==
Further reading

- Rosselli, John (1984). The Opera Industry in Italy from Cimarosa to Verdi: The Role of the Impresario. Cambridge University Press. ISBN 0521278678
