= Minnie Hauk =

Singer

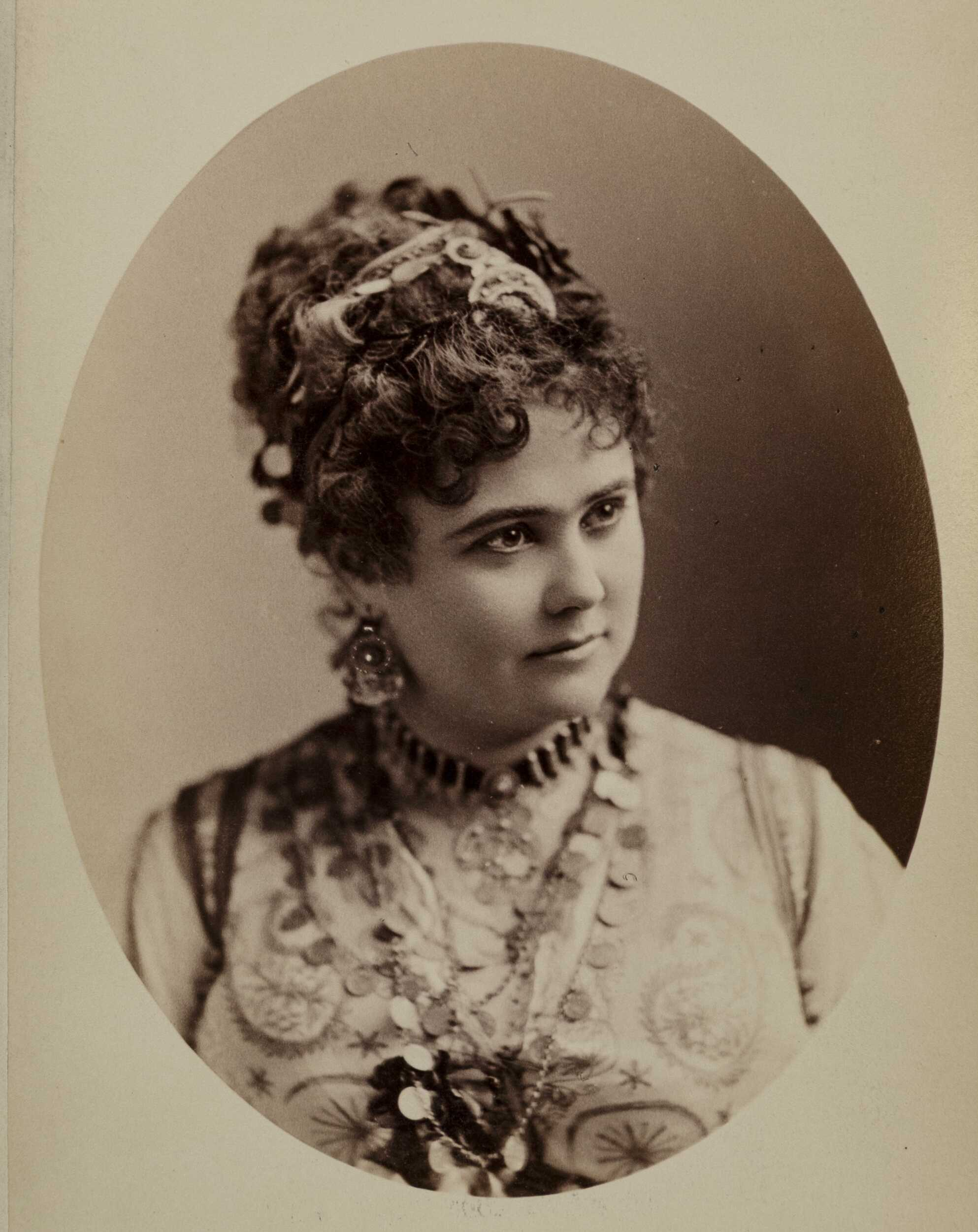
Hauk, ca. 1879 (photo by Sarony; Newberry Library, Chicago)

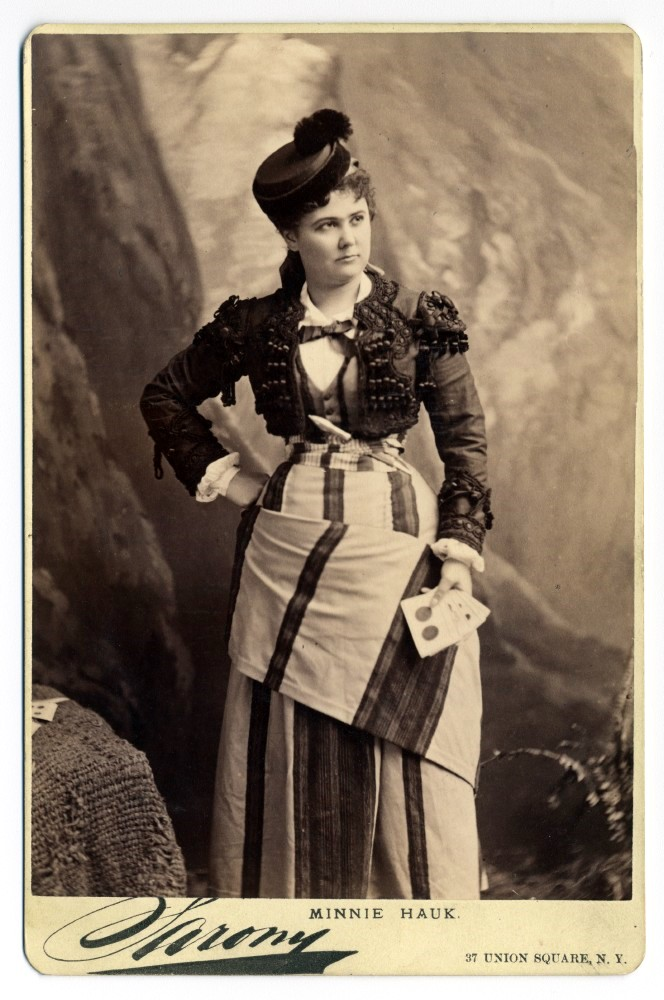
Hauk as Carmen, ca. 1880 (photo by Sarony; George Eastman Museum, Rochester)

Amalia Mignon Hauck (November 16, 1851 – February 6, 1929), commonly known as Minnie Hauk, was an American operatic first dramatic soprano then mezzo-soprano.

== Early life ==
She was born in New York City on November 16, 1851, the only child of Francis Hauck, a German emigrant, and his American wife. Soon after Minnie's birth the Haucks moved to Providence, Rhode Island, and then to Sumner, Kansas, in 1857. It was later wrongly rumoured that Hauk was the daughter of the financier Leonard Jerome, who was a devotee of the opera.

== Career ==
In 1865, Hauk began vocal studies with Achille Errani, who secured her a spot with the Max Maretzek Italian Opera Company. At age fourteen she made her public debut as opera singer in Brooklyn as Amina in La sonnambula, and a month later, in November 1866, her New York City debut as Prascovia in L'étoile du nord. In the American premiere of Gounod's Roméo et Juliette (November 15, 1867) she sang Juliette.

Hauk sang for the first time in Europe at Covent Garden, London, on 26 October 1868, and debuted in Paris in 1869. The soprano then appeared in Italian and German opera at the Grand Opera in Vienna (1870–1874) and other venues throughout Europe. Hauk interpreted the role Carmen, the previously unsuccessful opera by Georges Bizet, in a new intensive way for the first time on January 2, 1878 in Brussels. The immediate success brought the opera to longlasting fame. She then played the role at the opera's British and American premieres in 1878. Hauk performed Manon at its American premiere in 1885. Her voice became a mezzo-soprano of great strength and depth. Hauk stopped to sing intensive opera tours by end of 1893. Hauk's enormous repertory included approximately one hundred roles, and she sang Carmen in four languages.

== Later life and death ==
In 1878 she married Ernst von Hesse-Wartegg, the Austrian-American writer and traveler. Much of Hauk's fortune was lost during World War I. By 1920 she was thought to be impoverished and was nearly blind. Hauk died at her home near Lucerne, Switzerland, in 1929.
