= Lumley v Gye =

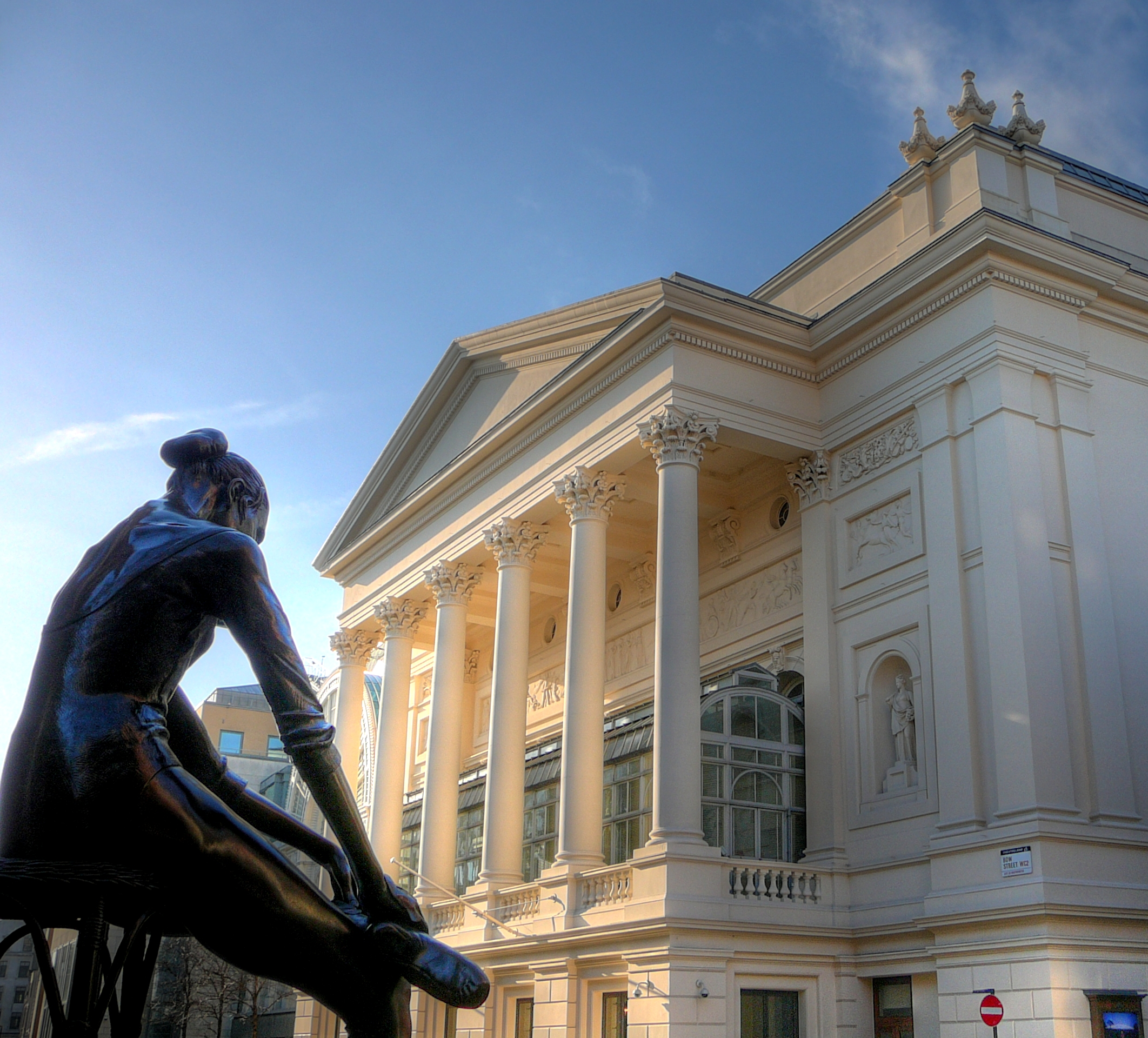
- Court: Queen's Bench
- Citations: [1853] EWHC QB J73, (1853) 118 ER 749, (1853) 2 Ellis and Blackburn 216

Case opinions
- Crompton J

Keywords
- Termination, condition

Lumley v Gye [1853] EWHC QB J73 is a foundational English tort law case, heard in 1853, in the field of economic tort. It held that one may claim damages from a third person who interferes in the performance of a contract by another.

Arising out of the same facts is also Lumley v Wagner, where Lumley successfully secured an injunction from Wagner against performing for Gye further.

== Facts ==
The singer Johanna Wagner was engaged by Benjamin Lumley to sing exclusively at Her Majesty's Theatre for three months. Frederick Gye, who ran Covent Garden Theatre, induced her to break her contract with Mr. Lumley by promising to pay her more. Although an injunction was issued to prevent her singing at Covent Garden, Gye persuaded her to disregard it. Lumley therefore sued Gye for damages in respect of the income he had lost.

== Judgment ==
Crompton J held that Lumley could claim damages from Gye. He observed that although the general law is there is no action, by then it had become clear that a claim lay for wrongfully and maliciously enticing a person to break their contract with another.

as a general proposition of law... no action will lie for procuring a person to break a contract, although such procuring is with a malicious intention and causes great and immediate injury. And the law as to enticing servants was said to be contrary to the general rule and principle of law, and to be anomalous, and probably to have had its origin from the state of society when serfdom existed, and to be founded upon, or upon the equity of, the Statute of Labourers. It was said that it would be dangerous to hold that an action was maintainable for persuading a third party to break a contract, unless some boundary or limits could be pointed out; and that the remedy for enticing away servants was confined to cases where the relation of master and servant, in a strict sense, subsisted between the parties; and that, in all other cases of contract, the only remedy was against the party breaking the contract. ‘Whatever may have been the origin or foundation of the law as to enticing of servants, and whether it be, as contended by the plaintiff, an instance and branch of a wider rule, or whether it be, as contended by the defendant, an anomaly and an exception from the general rule of law on such subjects, it must now be considered clear law that a person who wrongfully and maliciously, or, which is the same thing, with notice, interrupts the relation subsisting between master and servant... commits a wrongful act for which he is responsible at law.

Wightman J and Erle J concurred.

== See also ==
- UK labour law
- English tort law
