= L'ebreo =

1855 opera by Giuseppe Apolloni

L'ebreo (The Hebrew) is an 1855 opera by Giuseppe Apolloni to a libretto by Antonio Boni adapted from Edward Bulwer-Lytton's novella Leila; or, The Siege of Granada of 1838. It premiered on 25 January 1855 at La Fenice, Venice.

== Plot ==
The setting is the siege of Granada in the last years of the reconquest of Spain by Ferdinand of Aragon and Isabella I of Castile. Issachar, the titular Hebrew, is the magician of muslim King Boabdil, whom he betrays hoping to obtain freedom under the Spanish for his people. His daughter, Leila is in love with his enemy, the general Adèl-Muza. Issachar joins the Spanish but the Inquisition sentence him to the stake. He escapes by setting fire to the Spanish camp. Leila is taken to Ferdinand and Isabelle, who seek to convert her. At the baptism of the girl her father appears and stabs her, as she dies Adèl-Muza then reveals himself. Both the magician and the Moorish general are sentenced to the stake.

== Recordings ==
- Simone Alaimo (Issàchar), Fernanda Costa (Leila), Dino Di Domenico (Adèl-Muza), Armando Caforio (Ferdinando), Paola Bidinelli (Isabella), Francesco Piccoli (Boabdil, Gran Giudice); Orchestra Sinfonica di San Remo and Coro 'Francesco Cilea' of Reggio Calabria, conducted by Massimo de Bernart, Bongiovanni 1989
