= Frederick Gye =

English businessman and opera manager

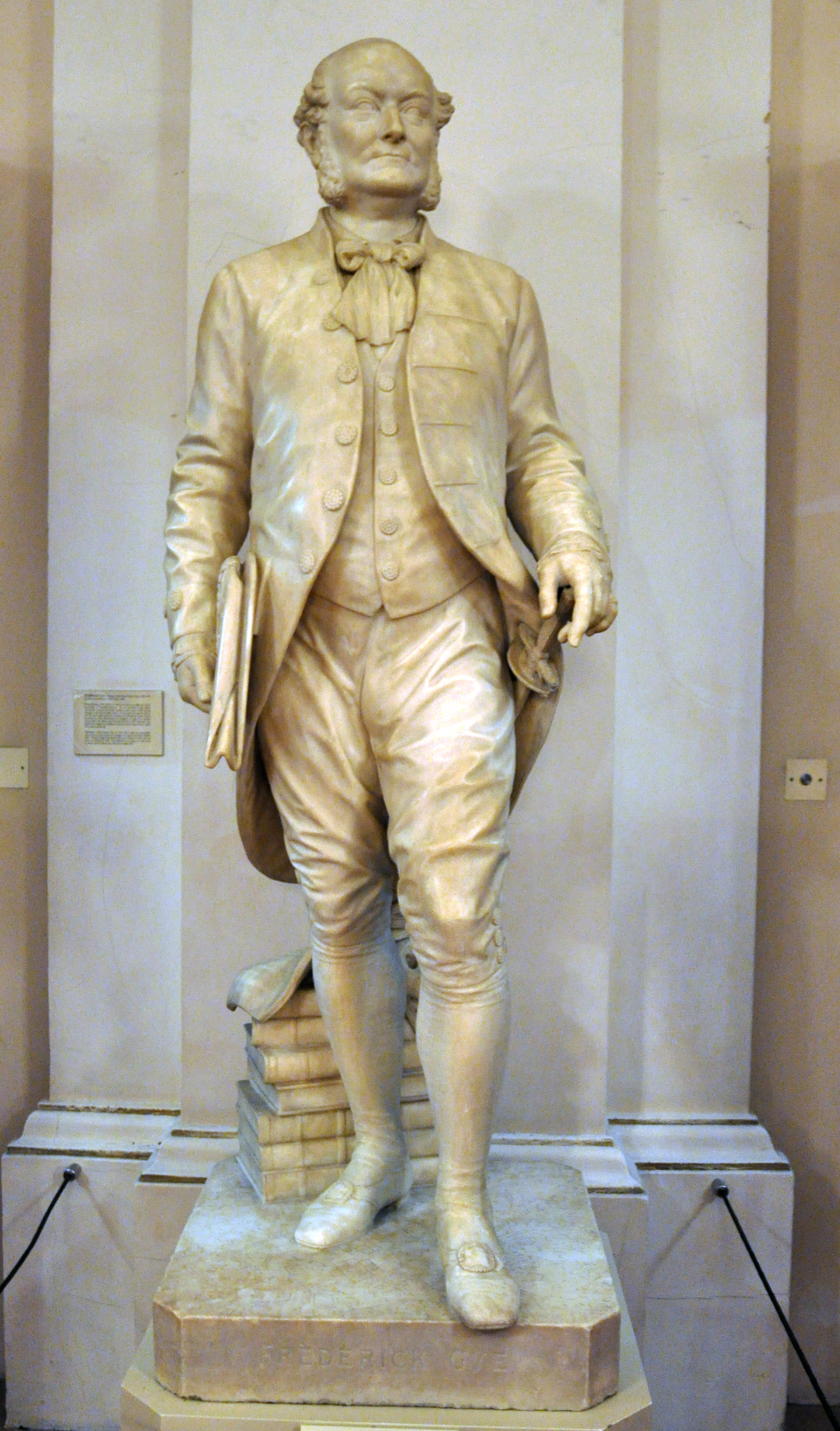
Statue of Frederick Gye, by Count Gleichen, 1880 (at the Royal Opera House, Covent Garden)

Frederick Gye (the younger) (1810–1878) was an English businessman and opera manager who for many years ran what is now the Royal Opera House, Covent Garden.

== Life ==
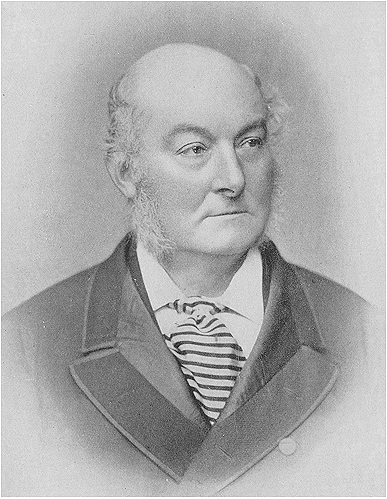
Image of Mr. Gye

Gye, son of Frederick Gye (the elder), was born at Finchley, Middlesex, in 1810, and educated at Frankfurt-am-Main. He assisted his father in the management of Vauxhall Gardens from about 1830, and at the same period had a contract for lighting some of the government buildings. He was afterwards associated with Monsieur Louis Antoine Jullien in the Covent Garden promenade concerts in 1846, and was his acting-manager when Jullien opened Drury Lane Theatre as an English opera house in 1847.

When Edward Delafield became lessee of the Italian Opera House, Covent Garden, in 1848, Gye was appointed business manager. On 14 July 1849 Delafield was declared bankrupt; Gye, in conjunction with the artists, carried on the house for the remainder of the season as a joint-stock undertaking. In September 1849 he was the acknowledged lessee, having obtained a lease for seven years, and receiving a salary of £1,500 per annum as manager. On 24 July in that year he produced Meyerbeer's Le prophète, but it never became a favourite piece in England.

In 1851 the repertory of Covent Garden opera house included thirty-three operas, three of which were by Meyerbeer. On 9 August Gounod's Sapho was played, the first opera by that composer that was heard in England, but it was a failure. Johanna Wagner, a German prima donna, breaking her contract with Benjamin Lumley in 1852, engaged to sing for Gye. Legal proceedings ensued, and in the Court of the Queen's Bench on 20 February 1853 judgment was given in favour of Lumley, but without damages.

In 1853 Verdi's Rigoletto and Berlioz's Benvenuto Cellini were given for the first time in England. Covent Garden had now become a success, good operas, with the best artists, and Michael Costa as conductor, serving to draw paying audiences; but on 5 March 1856 the house was destroyed by fire. Gye received £8,000 from the insurance offices for the properties in the house, which were valued at £40,000.

The opera during the seasons of 1856 and 1857, commencing 15 April 1856, was held in the Lyceum Theatre, where in the first season forty operas were given, and advertised as being under Gye's direction. The renters and proprietors of Covent Garden finding themselves unable to collect the money to rebuild that theatre, Gye with great energy raised or became accountable for £120,000, the sum which the new structure cost. The opera house, from the designs of Edward Middleton Barry, R.A., was commenced and completed in the short period of six months.

In 1857 Gye obtained a new ground lease from the Duke of Bedford for ninety years at a rent of £850 per annum, and opened the house on 15 April 1858, when the novelty was Flotow's Martha. In the following year Giacomo Meyerbeer's Dinorah was added to the repertory. In 1860 concerts were given in the newly built Floral Hall, adjoining Covent Garden Market. The notable event of 1861 was the appearance on 14 May of Adelina Patti as Amina in La Sonnambula. In 1863 Pauline Lucca was first seen, but she did not make her name until 1865, when she returned to play Selika in L'Africaine. Gye failed entirely to appreciate Gounod's Faust, declining over and over again to mount it until obliged to do so by its great success at Her Majesty's Theatre in 1863.

An attempt was made in 1865 to amalgamate Her Majesty's and Covent Garden into the Royal Italian Opera Company, Limited, when Gye was to have had £270,000 for his interest in the latter house, but the project came to nothing. In 1869, however, the two establishments were joined under the management of Gye, and a season commencing on 30 March left a profit of £22,000. Mapleson, the lessee of Her Majesty's, and Gye dissolved their partnership in the autumn of 1870, when there is said to have been a mortgage of £150,000 on Covent Garden. Gye had much litigation between 1861 and 1872 with Brownlow William Knox, his partner in the Italian opera, who filed a bill in chancery against him (on 20 March 1861) for a dissolution of partnership and a production of accounts. The action was finally settled in Gye's favour by a judgment of the House of Lords on 8 July 1872.

In 1871 the Royal Italian Opera entered upon a period of prosperity, which lasted until Gye's death. During this time the profits were upwards of £15,000 a year, despite increasing salaries of artists and other heavy expenses. Mlle Emma Albani, afterwards wife of Frederick Gye's son Ernest, made her début in 1872, and in the following year fully established her position on the stage. In 1874 eighty-one performances of thirty-one operas by thirteen composers were given. In 1875 Gye, finding that there was a growing taste for Wagner's music, produced Lohengrin, and in 1876 Tannhäuser and Il Vascello Fantasma (The Flying Dutchman with the lyrics translated into Italian).

During his last season (1878) the novelties were Flotow's Alma and Victor Massé's Paul et Virginie.

On 27 November 1878 Gye was shot accidentally while a guest at Ditchley Park, Viscount Dillon's seat in Oxfordshire. He died from the effects of the wound on 4 December 1878, and was buried at Norwood Cemetery on 9 December.

On the whole his management of the largest establishment of its kind in Europe was honourable to himself and advantageous to his many patrons, and, although his knowledge of music was very limited, his business abilities were great. He was probably by far the most successful lessee of any of the operatic establishments which have existed in England. On 5 November 1878 he patented a new electric light, with which he proposed to illuminate the opera house.

Gye married by licence dated 12 March 1834, Elizabeth Hughes, by whom he had a numerous family. By his will he left the whole of his property, comprising Covent Garden Theatre and the Floral Hall, to his children, the management devolving on Mr. Ernest Gye and one of his brothers.
