= Giuseppe Apolloni =

Italian composer (1822–1889)

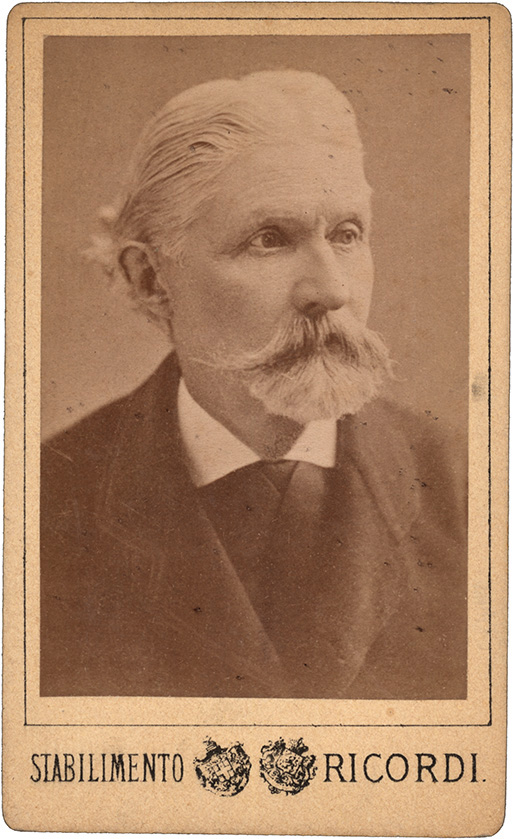
Giuseppe Apolloni

Giuseppe Apolloni (8 April 1822 – 31 December 1889) was an Italian composer born in Vicenza, Austrian Empire. His first opera, Adelchi, based on the omonymous tragedy by Manzoni, was staged at Vicenza in 1852. He composed a total of five operas. His most successful opera was L'ebreo, based on Bulwer-Lytton’s Leila. Apolloni died in Vicenza on 31 December 1889.

== Bibliography ==
- Ashbrook, William (2001). "Apolloni, Giuseppel". Grove Music Online. Oxford University Press. doi:10.1093/gmo/9781561592630.article.46389.
