= James Henry Mapleson =

English opera manager

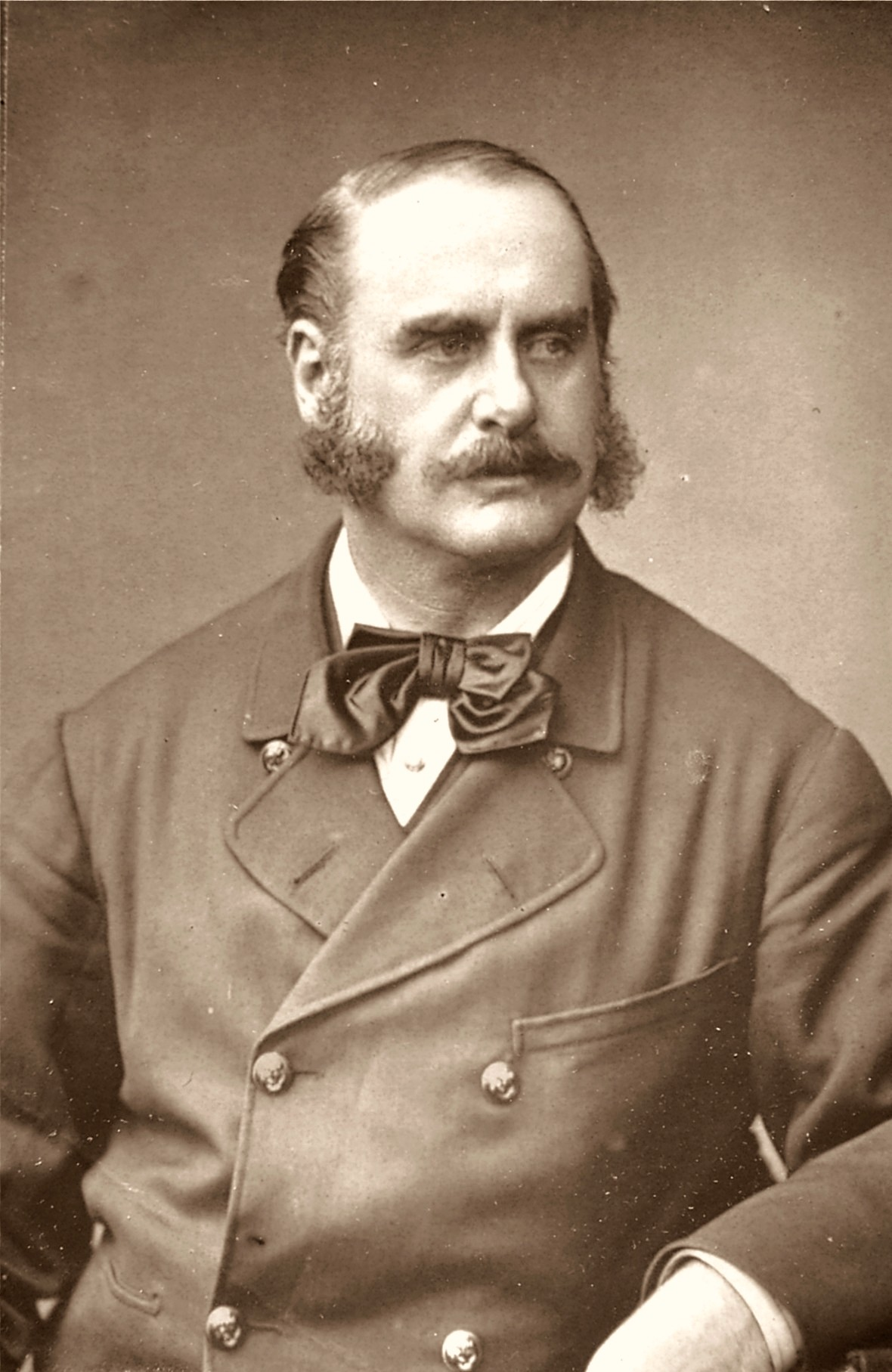
James Henry Mapleson

James Henry Mapleson (Colonel Mapleson) (4 May 1830 – 14 November 1901) was an English opera impresario and a leading figure in the development of opera production and of the careers of singers in London and New York in the mid-19th century.

Born into a musical family, he briefly pursued a career as a singer before turning to management. In the 1860s he was the dominant force in London's operatic scene. At the Academy of Music in New York, from 1879 to 1883 he presented opera in an unprecedentedly glamorous style.

After his early successes, Mapleson failed to keep pace with changing public tastes. His productions and repertoire were seen as old-fashioned, and he was no longer able to engage the top operatic stars, who were to be seen at the Metropolitan Opera and Covent Garden.

== Life and career ==
=== Early years ===
Mapleson was born in London on 4 May 1830, the son of James Henry Mapleson (1802–1869) and his wife Elizabeth, née Rummens. James Henry Mapleson was a violinist at and music librarian of the Theatre Royal, Drury Lane for forty years. The younger Mapleson studied as a singer and violinist at the Royal Academy of Music in London from 1844 to 1846. Contrary to some biographical sketches, Mapleson was never in the regular army, but he liked to be known as "Colonel Mapleson" on the strength of an honorary officership in a volunteer regiment, the Tower Hamlets rifle brigade.

In 1849 Mapleson organised a tour of the British provinces with a concert company that included Henriette Sontag, Luigi Lablache and pianist Sigismond Thalberg. In 1850 he led another concert company, including the mezzo-soprano Pauline Viardot. He wrote as a music critic for The Atlas.

In the early 1850s, Mapleson travelled to Italy to study. In 1854 he sang in Lodi and Verona under the name Enrico Mariani. Returning to London in 1854, he abandoned his singing career, and in 1856, he founded a musical agency in London, using his Italian contacts and his knowledge of the language to supply artists for The Royal Italian Opera, Covent Garden and Her Majesty's. In 1858 he became an assistant to Edward Tyrrel Smith, manager of the opera at the Haymarket Theatre until 1861, when Smith retired from the promotion of Italian opera.

In 1861 Mapleson took over management of the Lyceum Theatre, presenting in his first year Il trovatore and the English premiere of Un ballo in maschera, both with Thérèse Tietjens, who performed with his companies for the rest of her career. One of Mapleson's early stars was Adelina Patti. Between 1862 and 1867 he managed Her Majesty's, presenting Italian, French, and German opera and promoting such singers as De Murska, Mario, Giulia Grisi and Christina Nilsson. Her Majesty's burnt down in 1868, and Mapleson moved to Drury Lane, where he introduced, among others, Italo Campanini, who became a Mapleson regular for many years. In the following two years, there was collaboration between the Drury Lane and Covent Garden companies, in partnership with Frederick Gye.

=== Later years ===
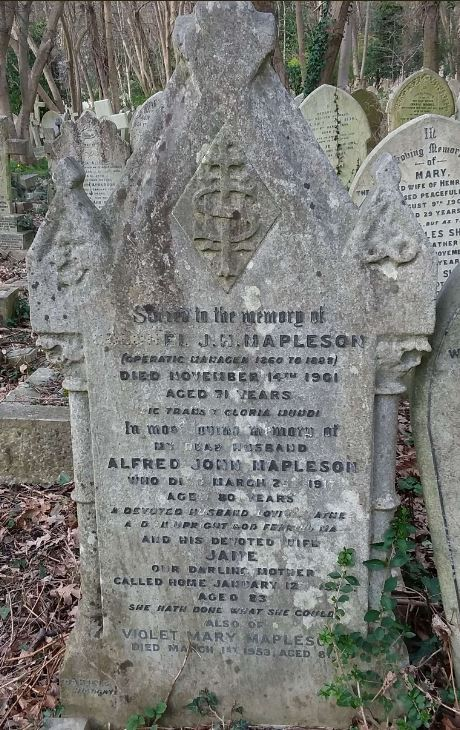
Grave of James Henry Mapleson in Highgate Cemetery

From 1871 to 1876 Mapleson remained in charge at Drury Lane. In 1875, he began work on a 2,000-seat National Opera House on the Thames Embankment. By 1877, the building was well under way, but funds ran out, and Mapleson had to abandon the project. Eventually, the Metropolitan Police bought the site and built Scotland Yard there in 1887. Mapleson transferred again to Her Majesty's Theatre, which he rebuilt in 1877, producing opera there until 1881 and also in 1887 and 1889, and at Covent Garden until his last seasons in 1885 and 1887.

At the same time, Mapleson took an impressive company to New York, promoting opera seasons at the Academy of Music there, beginning with Bizet's Carmen, and presenting many American premieres, between 1878 and 1886, staging his productions with what Grove's Dictionary of Music and Musicians calls "unprecedentedly glamorous style". He also made tours of other cities in the United States with his company during that time. His fortunes began to decline after 1881, and in 1883 the Metropolitan Opera House opened. Mapleson faced strong competition from the new company, forcing him to raise singers' salaries and incur other increased expenses. His losses mounted, forcing him into bankruptcy by 1887.

After the successes of his earlier career, Mapleson failed to keep pace with changing public tastes. The Italian operas in his repertory were seen as old-fashioned, he could no longer provide singers of the quality of Tietjens and his other earlier stars, and his productions were outmoded. In 1888 Augustus Harris, who had strong financial backing, took over Covent Garden, mounting lavish, starry and innovative productions with which Mapleson could not compete. His last London (1889) and New York (1896) seasons both failed disastrously.

Mapleson's memoirs, The Mapleson Memoirs, 1848–1888, were published in 1888 by Remington and Co in London, and Belford, Clarke and Co in New York. His use of the title "Colonel" may have caused confusion among biographers about his matrimonial status: his son James, also known as "Colonel Mapleson", was married to the French soprano Marie Roze, but some writers have understood her to have been the wife of Mapleson senior.

Mapleson died of Bright's disease in London on 14 November 1901 and was buried in Highgate Cemetery.

== Sources ==
- Rodmell, Paul (2016). Music and Institutions in Nineteenth-Century Britain. Routledge. ISBN 978-1-317-09247-6.
