= Benjamin Lumley =

British theatre manager and lawyer

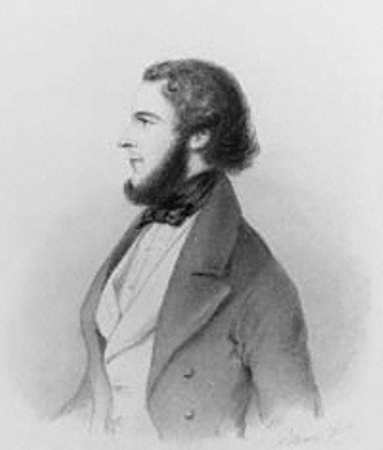
Portrait of Lumley by D'Orsay

Benjamin Lumley (1811 – 17 March 1875 in London) was a British North America-born British opera manager and solicitor. Born Benjamin Levy, he was the son of a Jewish merchant, Louis Levy.

== Beginnings at His Majesty's Theatre ==
Lumley's father was a clothes-dealer who had made his original fortune in British North America. The young Benjamin Levy was a pupil at King Edward's School, Birmingham.

Lumley trained as a solicitor, and then studied for the Bar under Basil Montagu. In this capacity he gave legal advice to the financially troubled manager of what was then His Majesty's Theatre, Pierre Laporte, who came to rely on him extensively. As Lumley had become familiar with making managerial decisions for the theatre, when Laporte died in 1841 the board of the opera company, consisting mainly of wealthy noblemen, asked him to take over.

Lumley had already written a standard handbook on Parliamentary private bills and was launched on a promising legal career. But his memoirs clearly indicate his pleasure in mixing in high society and making a name for himself. Management of Her Majesty's Theatre (now renamed after the accession of Queen Victoria) gave him chances of close relations with stars of the opera and ballet, to give and attend ostentatious parties, and to bring high-quality Italian opera to Victorian London.

The conductor at Her Majesty's was Michael Costa. By their different natures – one a devotee of high musical standards, the other a connoisseur of the star system, Lumley and Costa should have made a perfect team. Indeed they were so for the first five years, one of the longer surviving partnerships of the age. Artistic progress, induced by Lumley, against the inclinations of the more conservative Costa, included the introduction of operas by Giuseppe Verdi to London and of new stars of song and dance, negotiations with Felix Mendelssohn for an opera on William Shakespeare's The Tempest, and in 1847 the London debut of Jenny Lind. The resulting financial success led the optimistic Lumley to purchase the underlying lease of the theatre.

One of the sensations of Lumley's management was the appearance in 1845 of the balletic 'Pas de Quatre', choreographed by Perrot and scored by Pugni. This featured as dancers Marie Taglioni, Carlotta Grisi, Cerrito and Grahn, which may have been inspired by Lumley seeing four girls dancing outside the theatre. The 'Pas de Quatre' became an institution and is frequently revived.

== Conflict with Costa ==
First, Costa felt neglected by Lumley, who wisely from an artistic point of view was not keen to produce Costa's own ballets and operas. Furthermore, Lumley refused to let Costa take up the task of chief conductor to the Royal Philharmonic Society, then the leading London symphonic orchestra. In 1846 Costa decamped to Covent Garden with most of the orchestra and singers and the support of some leading London critics, to establish there the second Royal Italian Opera Company in competition with Lumley.

Lumley swiftly fought back, showing all his skills as an opportunist. He engaged the composer Michael Balfe to replace Costa. In 1847, despite legal threats from the Covent Garden management, he brought Jenny Lind over for her London debut, for which he had prepared with unprecedented levels of spin and publicity. Giuseppe Verdi had been engaged to write an opera for London, originally intended to be Macbeth, but this was first given in Florence, and so Verdi decided to produce I masnadieri for London.

Verdi left Italy at the end of May 1847 with his work for London completed except for the orchestration, which he left until the opera was in rehearsal. The cast for the première on 22 July 1847 was of the highest international standard. In particular, as the highlight of her first season in England, the great Swedish coloratura soprano Jenny Lind was engaged to create the role of Amalia, the opera's heroine. Queen Victoria and Prince Albert attended the first performance, together with the Duke of Wellington and every member of the British aristocracy and fashionable society able to gain admission.

After considerable persuasion, Verdi agreed to conduct the première, which was a triumphant success; the press was for the most part generous in its praise. Fortunately for Lumley, things had turned out well and very profitably. Lind appeared as Alice in Robert le diable by Giacomo Meyerbeer, and Mendelssohn, who on his last London visit had encouraged her to take up Lumley's offer, was in the audience despite his known distaste for Meyerbeer's work.

Lumley had also extensively advertised Mendelssohn's Tempest opera as forthcoming. This was a bare-faced lie. Mendelssohn found the libretto by Eugene Scribe completely unacceptable and did not even begin to write the music for it. The death of Mendelssohn in 1847 however gave Lumley an escape from his fabrications, and he commissioned the French composer Fromental Halévy to take it on. But the premiere of La Tempesta in 1850 was, at most, a succès d'éstime.

== Financial problems ==
Meanwhile Lumley had extended his interests by taking on additionally the management of the Théâtre des Italiens in Paris, and was soon negotiating with the actress Rachel and Victor Hugo. Despite his frenzied activities he soon began to have problems paying his stars and was surprised when they began to walk out on him. The soprano Johanna Wagner, niece of the composer Wagner, was lured to Covent Garden, sparking off complex litigation. The resulting case, 'Lumley v Gye', is still regarded as a fundamental basis of employment contract law. Lumley won the case, but it was for him a pyrrhic victory, resulting in financial loss.

By 1853 the financial problems were overwhelming, and Lumley ran for cover to France. He was tempted back when in 1856, the Covent Garden Theatre once again caught fire, and for three years he resumed the leadership of Italian opera in London. But when Covent Garden was rebuilt as the same theatre that stands today, he was offered the tenure for £100,000, but simply lacked the funds.

== Abandonment of the opera ==
Lumley returned to the law, and in his later years wrote two works of fantasy – Sirenia; or, Recollections of a Past Existence (1863) and Another World (1873) – and a legal reference book. His previous successes were never to be repeated. He died in 1875, leaving less than £1000 in his will.
