= The Destruction of Sodom =

Painting by J. M. W. Turner

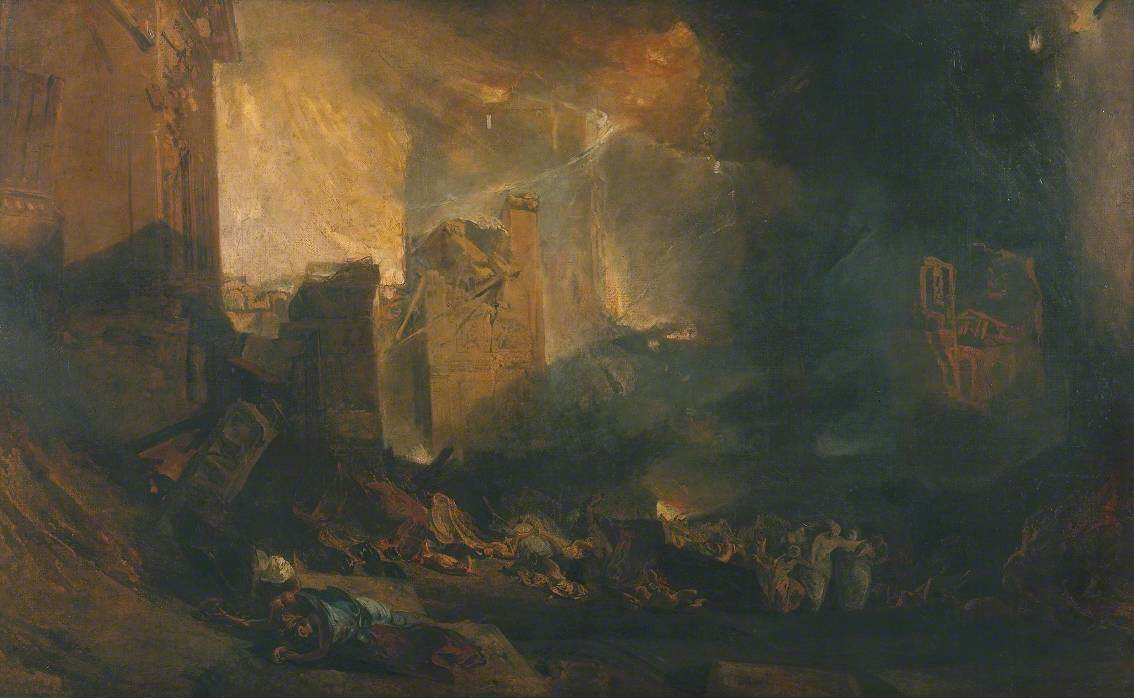
- Artist: J.M.W. Turner
- Year: 1805
- Type: Oil on canvas, history painting
- Dimensions: 237.5 cm × 146 cm (93.5 in × 57 in)
- Location: Tate Britain, London
- Website: www.tate.org.uk/...n00474

The Destruction of Sodom is an 1805 history painting by the British artist J.M.W. Turner. It depicts a scene from the Old Testament, the destruction of the city of Sodom. Lot and his daughters are shown on the right, fleeing the city. It was one of the three biblical disaster scenes Turner produced during the early nineteenth century along with The Fifth Plague of Egypt and The Tenth Plague of Egypt.

The painting was exhibited at Turner's own studio in Queen Anne Street in Marylebone in 1805, which the artist used as an alternative to submitting works to the Royal Academy of Arts's Summer Exhibitions at Somerset House. It formed part of the Turner Bequest of 1856 and is now in the collection of the Tate Britain in Pimlico.

== See also ==
- List of paintings by J. M. W. Turner

== Bibliography ==
- Bailey, Anthony. J.M.W. Turner: Standing in the Sun. Tate Enterprises Ltd, 2013.
- Hamilton, James. Turner's Britain. Merrell, 2003.
- Moyle, Franny. Turner: The Extraordinary Life and Momentous Times of J. M. W. Turner. Penguin Books, 2016.
- Reynolds, Graham. Turner. Thames & Hudson, 2022.
