= Handel Festival 1857 =

Music concerts by George Frederic Handel

The Handel Festival at the Crystal Palace, 1857 (The Illustrated London News, 27 June 1857)

The Handel Festival of 1857 was a series of concerts of music by George Frideric Handel, given by a large orchestra and chorus at the Crystal Palace in London. Its success led to the Triennial Handel Festival, held at the same venue, which continued until 1926.

== Background ==
In 1856, Robert Kanzow Bowley, treasurer of the Sacred Harmonic Society, conceived the idea, favourably received by the Society, of commemorating the genius of George Frideric Handel on the centenary (in 1859) of his death by performing some of his works on an unprecedented scale. No building in London being large enough to contain the necessary orchestra, the attention of the Society was directed towards the Central Transept of the Crystal Palace (of which they had already had experience in the performance of the music at the opening of the Palace on 10 May 1854) as the most likely venue. The Directors of the Crystal Palace Company entered warmly into the project, and it was determined to hold a preliminary festival in 1857.

== Concerts ==
A large orchestra was assembled, with a grand organ, built by Gray and Davison expressly for the occasion. With the chorus of the Society as a nucleus, a choir of upwards of 1,200 picked singers was formed in London, which was supplemented by others from towns in the United Kingdom until the whole numbered 2,000. The orchestra, similarly constituted, numbered 396. The meeting, under the title of "The Great Handel Festival", was held on Monday, Wednesday, and Friday, 15, 17, and 19 June 1857, with a public rehearsal on the preceding Saturday. The musical performances were organized by the Society, the Company taking charge of the other arrangements. The oratorios The Messiah, Judas Maccabaeus and Israel in Egypt were performed, the principal singers including Clara Novello, Charlotte Dolby, Sims Reeves and Karl Formes, and the conductor being Michael Costa, as conductor of the Society.

== Subsequent festivals ==
This festival established that the Central Transept of the Palace might be made a fitting locality for the Handel Commemoration in 1859, which took place under the same management, on the 20, 22 and 24 June. The Messiah and Israel in Egypt again occupied the first and third days, the second being devoted to the Dettingen Te Deum and a selection from various works. The orchestra was augmented to 460, and the chorus to upwards of 2,700 performers; Michael Costa was conductor, and the principal singers included Clara Novello, Sims Reeves, and Giovanni Belletti. The acoustic was improved by enclosing the orchestra with wooden screens, and covering it in with an enormous awning of oiled and hardened canvas. The three performances and the public rehearsal were remarkably successful, and attracted 81,319 visitors.

=== Triennial Handel Festival ===
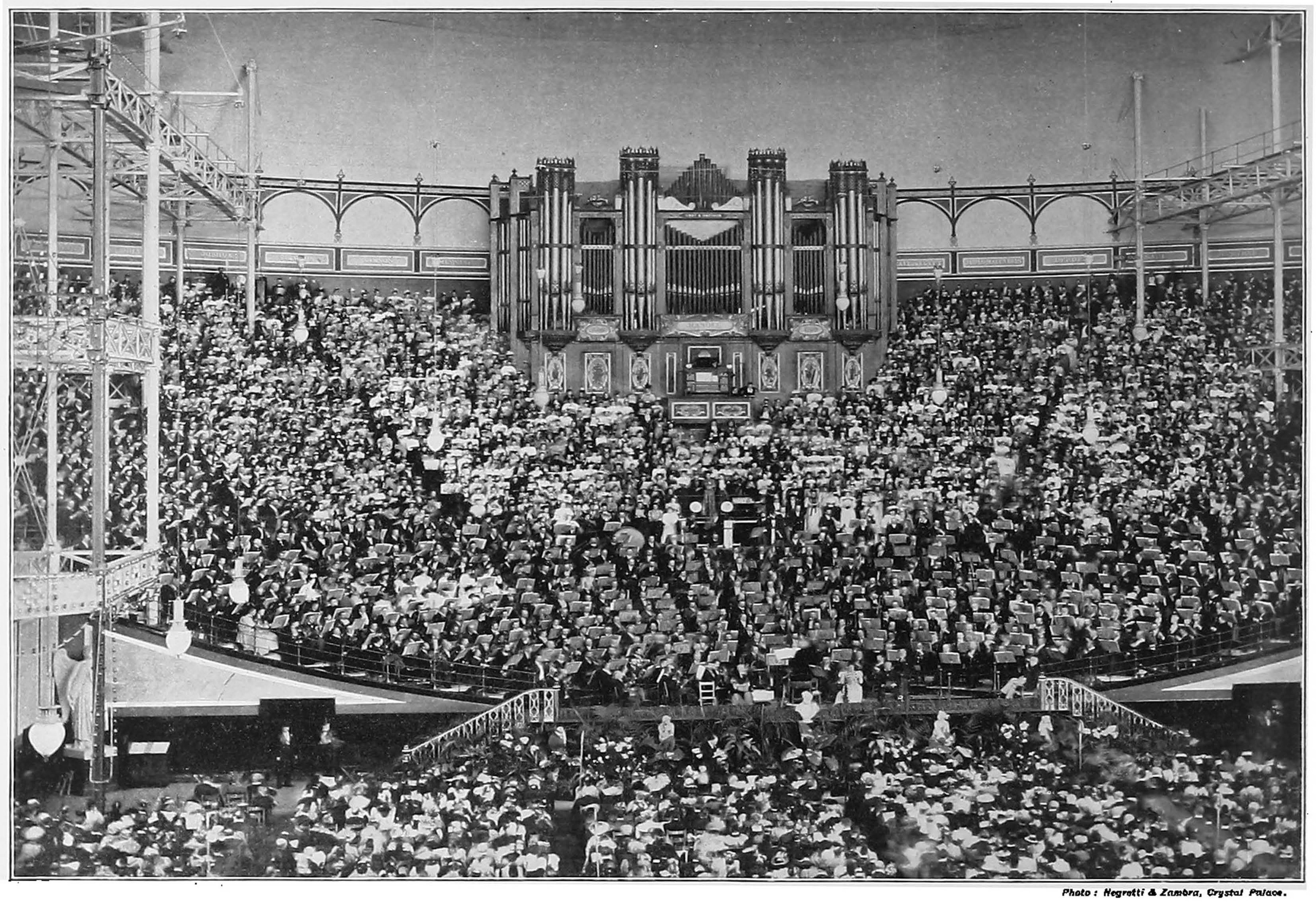
A Handel Festival at the Crystal Palace in the 1880s

This success led to the determination that similar festivals should be held periodically under the name of the Triennial Handel Festival. The early festivals were held in 1862, 1865, 1868, 1871, 1874, 1877, 1880, 1883, 1885 (the festival of 1886 being anticipated in order that it might coincide with the bicentenary of the composer's birth) and 1888.

The band was augmented in 1865 to 495 performers, and the chorus in 1874 to nearly 3,200. The sonority of the orchestra was increased by the erection in 1862 of a boarded roof covering in the whole space occupied by the performers, and extending 24 feet beyond the front. The concerts were conducted by Michael Costa until 1880, afterwards by August Manns.

Excerpts of a performance of Israel in Egypt at the 1888 festival were recorded on wax phonograph cylinders, creating the first known recordings of classical music.

The Triennial Festivals continued until 1926.

== See also ==
Handel Commemoration

Attribution
