= August Manns =

German-born British conductor

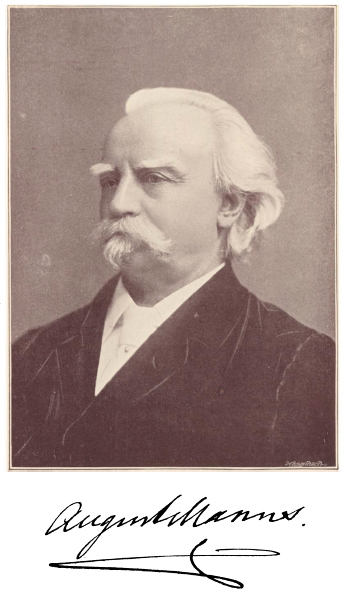
- August Manns in 1898
- Born: August Friedrich Manns; 12 March 1825; Stolzenburg, Prussia
- Died: 1 March 1907 (aged 81); Norwood, London, England
- Occupation: conductor

Sir August Friedrich Manns (12 March 1825 – 1 March 1907) was a German-born British conductor who made his career in England. After serving as a military bandmaster in Germany, he moved to England and soon became director of music at London's Crystal Palace. He increased the resident band to full symphonic strength and for more than forty years conducted concerts at popular prices. He introduced a wide range of music to London, including many works by young British composers, as well as works by German masters hitherto neglected in England. Among his British protégés were Arthur Sullivan, Charles Villiers Stanford, Hubert Parry, Hamish MacCunn, Edward Elgar and Edward German.

Manns performed the works of more than 300 composers, and was reckoned to have given more than 12,000 concerts during his tenure at the Crystal Palace, between 1855 and 1901. He became a British citizen in 1894 and was knighted in 1903.

== Life and career ==
=== Early years ===
Manns was born at Stolzenburg in Prussia near Stettin (now Stolec in Poland). His father was a glass-blower, with, as Manns recalled, "a pound a week and ten children," of whom August was the fifth. The family was musical, and the young August learnt to play the flute in the family's informal ensemble. At the age of ten, August temporarily took the place of one of his brothers at the factory, but he had no liking for the work of glass-blowing. His father briefly considered that August might be trained for a career as a schoolmaster, but the youth's predisposition for music prevailed. At the age of twelve he was sent to a school, kept by his uncle, at a neighbouring village. Here he was trained to play the flute, clarinet and violin. At fifteen he was apprenticed for three years to Urban, the town musician of Elbing, with whom Manns learnt to make the best of limited orchestral forces, transposing and switching instrumental parts as necessary. In his third year Manns played first violin in the string-band and first clarinet in the wind-band of Urban's Town-band; and he was selected by Urban to receive special lessons in harmony and composition.

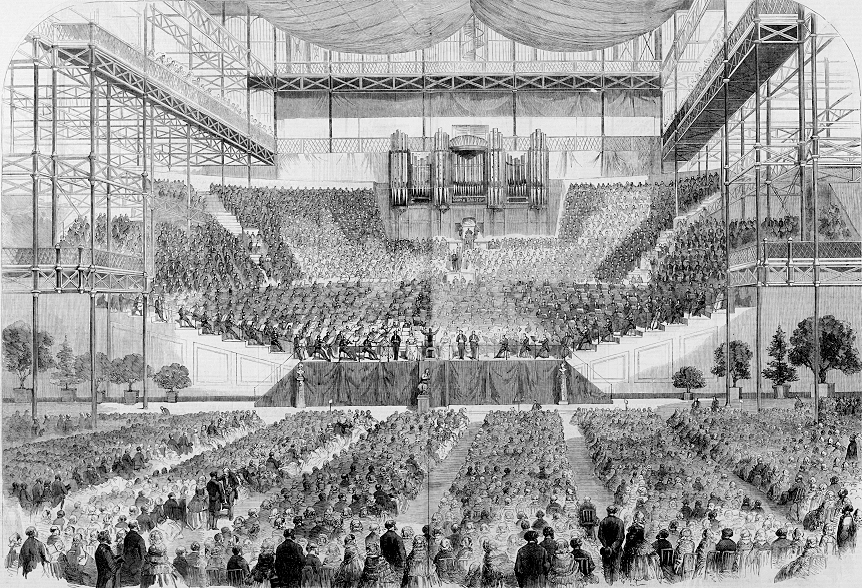
Crystal Palace concert hall in 1857

When Manns was approaching the age for military conscription, he avoided active service by volunteering as a member of an infantry band stationed at Danzig, for which he played the clarinet. At the same time he played the violin in the theatre, in concerts, and for the ballet. In 1848 his talent was spotted and he was invited to join Josef Gungl's orchestra in Berlin, where he played first violin. He was then appointed conductor and solo violinist at Kroll's Gardens in Berlin, a post that he held from 1849 to 1851, when the venue was destroyed by fire. Within weeks he was recruited by Colonel Albrecht von Roon to be the bandmaster of Roon's regiment. Manns replaced a dozen bad players, made new arrangements of classical works, including Beethoven overtures and symphonies for the wind band, and formed a string band. He resigned the position in 1854 when a junior officer reprimanded him for allowing his musicians to appear on parade with inadequately polished buttons.

In the same year Henry Schallehn, who had recently established a military band at the Crystal Palace in the suburbs of London, engaged Manns as clarinettist and sub-conductor. Within months there was a rift between the two men when Schallehn passed off a composition of Manns's as his own; when Manns protested, Schallehn dismissed him. Manns then earned a living teaching the violin in the English provinces, and playing in the opera orchestra in Edinburgh.

=== Crystal Palace ===
In 1855 Manns was invited to conduct a summer season of concerts in Amsterdam, after which he returned to England to take over at the Crystal Palace when the management, led by George Grove, then secretary of the Crystal Palace Company, dismissed Schallehn for his unsatisfactory work. The Musical World wrote,

The change will, we trust, lead to some necessary improvements in the band. Herr Manns has a capital opportunity of distinguishing himself. His resources are sufficient to constitute one of the finest bands in the kingdom, and we shall be glad to find the Crystal Palace orchestra achieve such a reputation under his conductorship. ... Herr Manns is too intelligent a musician not to appreciate the nature of his resources and the requirements of his public. It may be safely predicted, that the music at the Crystal Palace will be one of its principal attractions within a short time after the instalment of the new director.

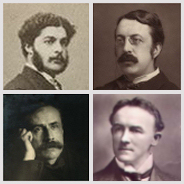
Four British composers championed by Manns: top, Sullivan and Stanford; bottom, Elgar and German

The rest of Manns's career was almost exclusively associated with the Crystal Palace. When he took over, the permanent band was a wind ensemble, from which, with four specially engaged string players, Manns improvised an orchestra of about thirty-four performers. With the backing of Grove and the directors of the Crystal Palace he gradually expanded the band into a full orchestra, for which a new concert room was added to the Crystal Palace. Together, Grove and Manns made the Crystal Palace concerts the principal source of classical music at popular prices. The concert season ran from October to April, with concerts given on Saturday afternoons from 1855 to 1901.

Within months of his appointment, Manns gave the first London performance of Schumann's Symphony No. 4 in D minor and the British premiere of Schubert's "Great C major" Symphony. His concerts featured the music of more than 300 composers. There were more Austro-German composers (104) than those of any other nationality, but British composers (82) came a strong second. Manns was the first conductor to introduce Arthur Sullivan to the English public, when he conducted the young Sullivan's Tempest music in April 1862. Manns later introduced early works by William Sterndale Bennett, Charles Villiers Stanford, Hubert Parry, Hamish MacCunn, Edward Elgar, Edward German and Ethel Smyth. Thirty years after Manns introduced the Tempest music, Sullivan wrote to him, "How much do I not owe to you, my dear old friend, for the helping hand you gave me to mount the first step on the ladder! I shall always think of you with gratitude and affection." Among contemporary continental composers, Johannes Brahms (in 1863), Joachim Raff (in 1870), and Antonín Dvořák (in 1879) also first became known in England through Manns's Crystal Palace concerts.

Not only did he champion continental composers, he also booked many German performers to play at the Crystal Palace. One of them was the pianist Anna Mehlig who came to London almost every year between 1866 and 1880.

Some fragments of a live performance of Handel's Israel in Egypt conducted by Manns at Crystal Palace in 1888 are among the earliest surviving recordings of classical music.

=== Other conductorships ===
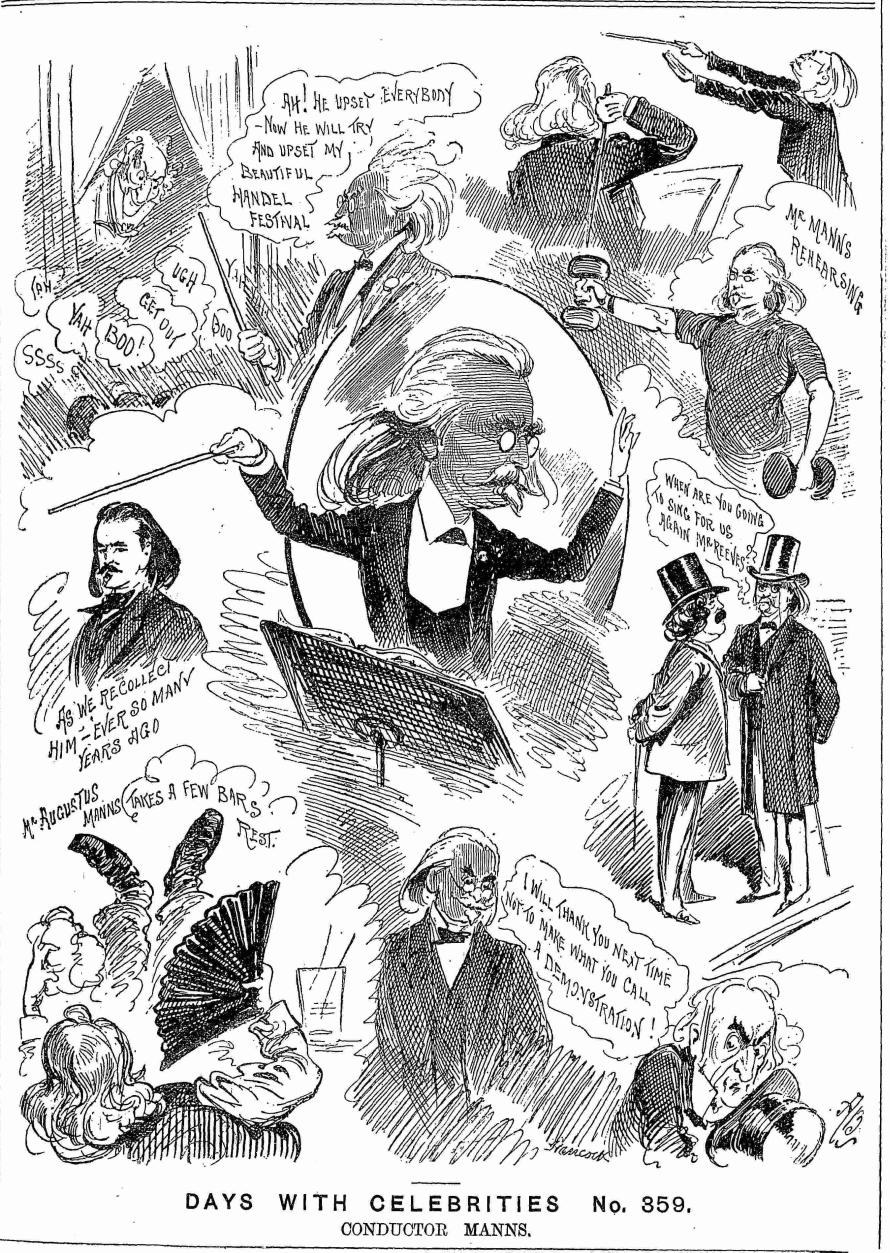
1888 caricatures of Manns

Manns retained the position of director of music until his retirement in 1901, undertaking few outside engagements. At the Crystal Palace he also conducted the triennial Handel Festivals, from 1883. He took on the 1883 festival at a few hours' notice, when the established conductor, Sir Michael Costa was unwell. He was at first regarded as less successful as a choral conductor than in the orchestral repertory; his beat was eccentric and puzzling to the uninitiated. He was, nevertheless, invited to conduct all the subsequent festivals up to and including 1900. He directed the orchestral concerts of the Glasgow Choral Union for thirteen seasons in succession. He conducted the promenade concerts at Drury Lane in 1859, and was conductor of the festivals of Sheffield in 1896 and 1899, and Cardiff in 1896.

After 1890 the Crystal Palace concerts declined in importance. Orchestral music could be heard elsewhere in London, and the old popularity of the palace had died out. Manns conducted till the season of 1900–01, concluding on 24 April. In 1898, The Musical Times estimated that he had conducted 12,000 orchestral concerts during his first 42 years at the Crystal Palace.

=== Personal life ===
Manns was married three times: his first wife died in 1850 or 1851; his second, Sarah Ann née Williams, with whom he had a daughter, died in 1893; his third wife, (Katharine Emily) Wilhelmina née Thellusson (b. 1865/6), whom he married on 7 January 1897, survived him.

Manns became a naturalised British citizen in May 1894. He was knighted in 1903 and died in Norwood, London, just short of his 82nd birthday. He was buried at West Norwood Cemetery.
