= Handel Commemoration =

Historical fact in England

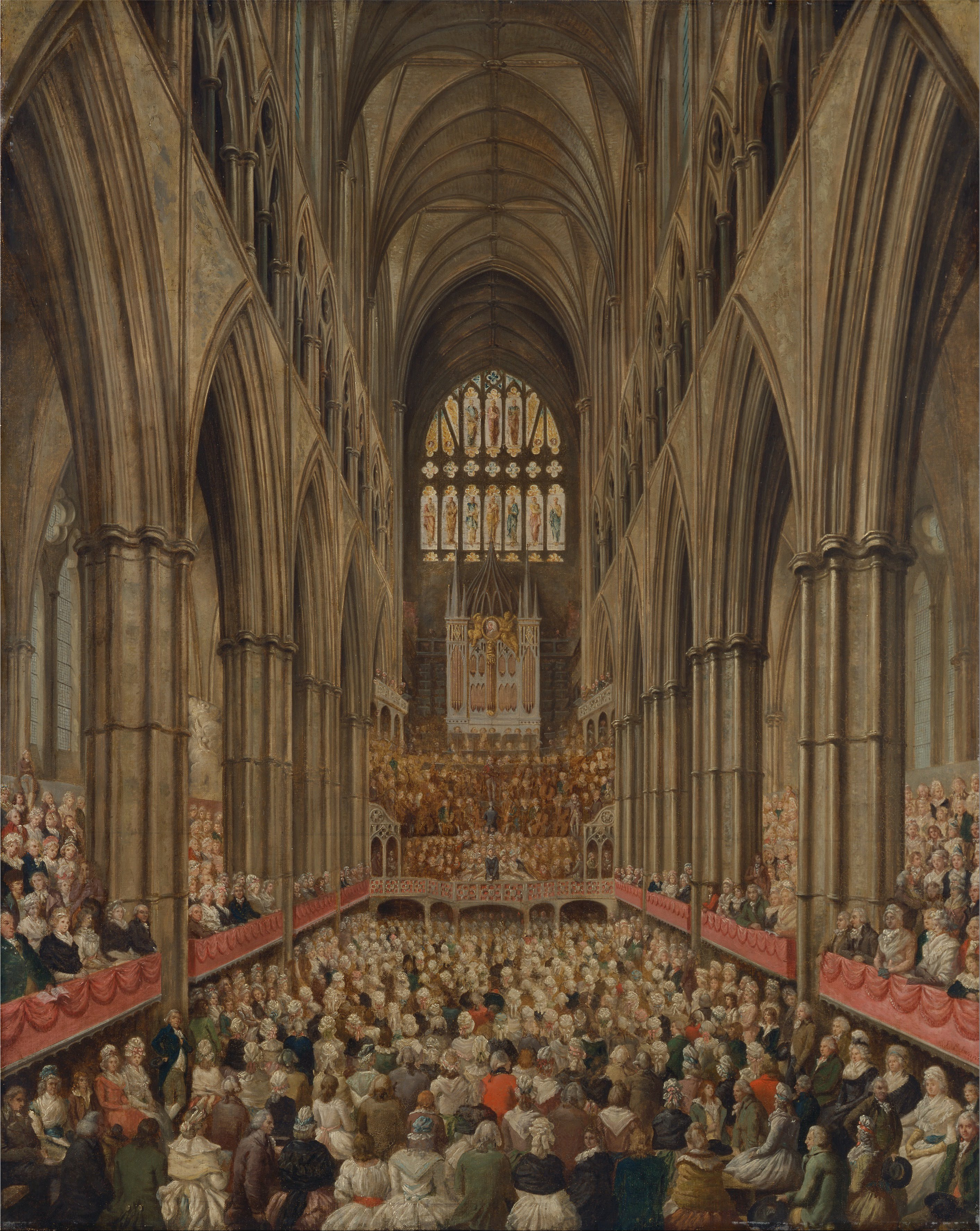
Interior View of Westminster Abbey on the Commemoration of Handel, Taken from the Manager's Box, Edward Edwards, ca. 1790. Yale Center for British Art

The original Handel Festival or "Commemoration" took place in Westminster Abbey between 26 May and 5 June 1784, to commemorate the twenty-fifth anniversary of the death of George Frideric Handel in 1759. A series of further commemorations were held between 1785 and 1859.

== 1784 Commemoration ==
The commemoration was organized by John Montagu, 4th Earl of Sandwich and the Concerts of Antient Music and took the form of a series of concerts of Handel's music, given in the Abbey by vast numbers of singers and instrumentalists.

Above Handel's own monument in the Abbey, there is a small additional tablet to record the commemoration. An account of the event was published by Charles Burney in the following year.

The commemoration established a fashion for large-scale performances of Handel's choral works throughout the nineteenth century and much of the twentieth. E.D. Mackerness described it as "the most important single event in the history of English music".

== Later commemorations ==
Five further Handel commemorations followed over the next seven years - in 1785, 1786, 1787, 1790 and 1791, the last with over 1,000 participants and an estimated audience of 2,200 people, including Joseph Haydn. Then in 1834, there was another larger scale commemoration - the Royal Musical Festival - also held at Westminster Abbey, this time with 625 participating musicians (223 instrumentalists, 397 choral singers and five soloists) and an audience of 2,700.

== 1859 Centenary ==
Following a preliminary festival in 1857, the 100th anniversary of Handel's death was commemorated at the Crystal Palace in 1859 on a similarly large scale. The festival included complete performances of The Messiah, the Dettingen Te Deum, and Israel in Egypt, along with excerpts from Belshazzar's Feast and Judas Maccabaeus.

== Triennial Handel Festival ==
This success led to the establishment of the Triennial Handel Festival. The early festivals were held in 1862, 1865, 1868, 1871, 1874, 1877, 1880, 1883, 1885 (the festival of 1886 being anticipated in order that it might coincide with the bicentenary of the composer's birth) and 1888.
