= George Perry (composer) =

British violinist, organist and composer

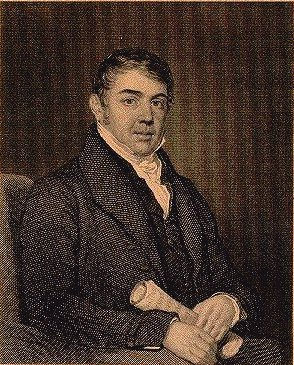
George Frederick Perry

George Frederick Perry (1793 – 4 March 1862) was a British violinist, organist, and composer of operas and oratorios. He was musical director of the Haymarket Theatre, and later was leader of the orchestra of the Sacred Harmonic Society.

== Early years ==
Perry was born in Norwich in 1793; his father was a turner and an amateur bass singer who took part in the annual performance of an oratorio at the cathedral, under John Christmas Beckwith. Through Beckwith, Perry became a member of the cathedral choir, and his musical ability was noticed. Perry locally learned violin and piano, also harmony and composition.

About 1818 Perry became leader of the orchestra at the Theatre Royal, Norwich, then an institution enjoying a high reputation. Perry wrote an oratorio, The Death of Abel (text by George Bennett of the Norwich Theatre), which was first performed in Norwich, and afterwards repeated by the Sacred Harmonic Society in 1841 and 1845. Shortly after his appointment to the theatre he wrote another oratorio, Elijah and the Priests of Baal, to a text by James Plumptre, which was first performed in Norwich on 12 March 1819.

== Haymarket Theatre ==
About 1822 Perry was appointed musical director of the Haymarket Theatre in London, where he wrote a number of operas. His comic opera Morning, Noon, and Night, with libretto by Thomas John Dibdin, included Madame Vestris in the cast; its opening night was 9 September 1822.

A few years later he produced the oratorio The Fall of Jerusalem, the text compiled from a poem by Henry Hart Milman. A song from the oratorio, "Fair are the flowers", was reviewed in 1828: "The song perhaps cannot be said to contain either novel or striking ideas, yet it is by no means commonplace, for there is a prevailing good taste which uniformly preserves it from falling into the beaten track of everyday compositions."

While still holding his appointment at the Haymarket, Perry became organist of the Quebec Chapel, and later, from 1846, organist of Trinity Church, Gray's Inn Road.

== Sacred Harmonic Society ==
In 1832 the Sacred Harmonic Society, an amateur choral society, was founded in London, and Perry was chosen as leader of the orchestra. It performed sacred works, particular those of Handel. At their first concert, on 15 January 1833, the programme contained a selection from Perry's oratorios The Fall of Jerusalem and The Death of Abel. From 1836 the Society gave concerts in the Exeter Hall in London. Perry was connected with the society until 1848; during his time there, Perry was never absent from a performance.

In 1847 he led the orchestra in the first performance in London of the revised version of Mendelssohn's Elijah with the composer conducting. The Times said: "Mr. Perry, the leader, was constantly beating time with his fiddle-stick in such a manner as to obstruct the views of the Conductor and confuse the attention of the instrumentalists."

A performance in 1838 of The Fall of Jerusalem by the Society at the Exeter Hall, with Perry "the zealous and enthusiastic leader" of the orchestra, was reviewed: "The prevailing defect is an absence of dramatic feeling.... The music is too tame, too sluggish, for the due expression of the passions, which the characters embody.... The style in which the composition is written, supplies evident proofs of Mr. Perry's intimate acquaintance with choral music.... Many of the movements, if they reveal no striking beauties, present no glaring defects.... The choral fugues are not elaborately worked; but yet there are displayed in them a steadiness of purpose, and simplicity of outline, which demand commendation...."

Perry also wrote an oratorio, Hezekiah (1847); a sacred cantata, Belshazzar's Feast (1836); a festival anthem with orchestral accompaniment; and Blessed be the Lord thy God, for Queen Victoria's accession (1838). His Thanksgiving Anthem for the Birth of the Princess Royal (1840) was performed with great success by the Sacred Harmonic Society, the orchestra and chorus numbering five hundred, Caradori Allan being the solo vocalist. He also wrote additional accompaniments to a number of Handel's works, and made scores for piano of several more.

Perry died on 4 March 1862, and was buried at Kensal Green Cemetery.

== Composing method ==
Perry's undoubted gifts enabled him to imitate rather than to create. His fluency proved disastrous to the character of his work. It is said that he was in the habit of writing out the instrumental parts of his large compositions from memory before he had made a full orchestral score, and he frequently composed as many as four or five works simultaneously, writing a page of one while the ink of another was drying.
