= Israel in Egypt =

1739 oratorio by George Frideric Handel

- Oratorio by George Frideric Handel
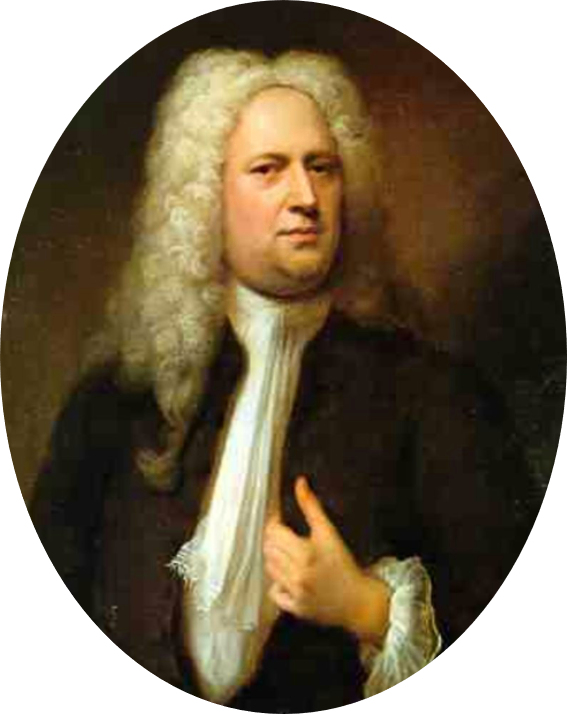
- Handel portrayed by Balthasar Denner, 1733
- Catalogue: HWV 54
- Year: 1739
- Text: Excerpts from Exodus and the Psalms, compiled by Charles Jennens
- Language: English
- Performed: 4 April 1739: London King's Theatre, Haymarket
- Movements: 46
- Scoring: soloists; choir; orchestra

Israel in Egypt, HWV 54, is a biblical oratorio by the composer George Frideric Handel. Most scholars believe the libretto was prepared by Charles Jennens, who also compiled the biblical texts for Handel's Messiah. It is composed entirely of selected passages from the Old Testament, mainly from Exodus and the Psalms.

Israel in Egypt premiered at London's King's Theatre in the Haymarket on April 4, 1739 with Élisabeth Duparc "La Francesina", William Savage, John Beard, Turner Robinson, Gustavus Waltz, and Thomas Reinhold. Handel started it soon after the opera season at King's Theatre was cancelled for lack of subscribers. The oratorio was not well received by the first audience though commended in the Daily Post; the second performance was shortened, the mainly choral work now augmented with Italian-style arias.

The first version of the piece is in three parts rather than two, the first part more famous as "The ways of Zion do mourn", with altered text as "The sons of Israel do mourn" lamenting the death of Joseph. This section precedes the Exodus, which in the three-part version is Part II rather than Part I.

== Background ==
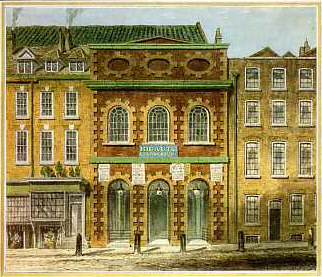
The Kings Theatre, London, in the Haymarket, where Israel in Egypt was first performed

Handel had long been resident in London and had enjoyed great success as a composer of Italian operas there. However, in 1733 a rival opera company to Handel's, The Opera of the Nobility, had split the audience for Italian opera in London. There was not enough support for two Italian opera companies and Handel began to find new audiences through presenting oratorio and other choral works in English.

Handel's oratorio Saul, with a text by Charles Jennens, was presented at the King's Theatre in January 1739, and for the same season Handel composed Israel in Egypt, writing the music in one month between 1 October and 1 November 1738. Israel in Egypt is one of only two oratorios by Handel with a text compiled from verses from the Bible, the other being Messiah. The librettist of Israel in Egypt is uncertain, but most scholars believe Charles Jennens compiled both texts. Israel in Egypt and Messiah also share the unusual characteristic among Handel oratorios in that, unlike the others, they do not have casts of named characters singing dialogue and performing an unstaged drama, but contain many choruses set to biblical texts. The libretto of Israel in Egypt is mainly based on the Book of Exodus, with the account of The Exodus of the Israelites in the first part, and the Song of the Sea in the latter part, called Moses Song by Handel.

In composing Israel in Egypt, in what was by then his common practice, Handel recycled music from his own previous compositions and also made extensive use of musical parody, the re-working of music by other composers. For the opening part of Israel in Egypt Handel slightly re-wrote his 1737 Funeral Anthem for Queen Caroline, "The Ways of Zion do Mourn", and he adapted two of his keyboard fugues, a chorus from his Dixit Dominus and an aria from one of his Chandos Anthems. From Alessandro Stradella's wedding serenata Qual prodigio é ch’io miri, Handel took the music for his choruses based on the biblical ten plagues: "He spake the word," "He gave them hailstones," "But as for his people/He led them," and "And believed the Lord," as well as the Part II chorus "The people shall hear/All th’inhabitants of Canaan.". From a Magnificat setting by Dionigi Erba, Handel took most or part of the music for "He rebuked the Red Sea," "The Lord is my Strength," "He is my God," "The Lord is a Man of War," "The depths have covered them/Thy right Hand, o Lord," "Thou sentest forth thy wrath," "And with the blast of thy nostrils," "Who is like unto Thee," and "Thou in thy mercy." Other composers Handel parodied in Israel in Egypt were Jean-Philippe Rameau, Johann Caspar Kerll, Francesco Antonio Urio, Nicolaus Adam Strungk and Friedrich Wilhelm Zachow.

Much more than the previous works by Handel which were designed, like Israel in Egypt, to attract paying audiences to a commercial venture in a privately owned theatre, the piece lays overwhelming emphasis on the chorus. As an added attraction, the small baroque orchestra accompanying was also used for an organ concerto, the Cuckoo and the Nightingale, which served as an interlude. However, London audiences at that time were not used to such extensive choral pieces presented as commercial entertainment, and perhaps particularly the opening dirge, of about thirty minutes in length, for the death of Joseph, adapted from the funeral anthem for a recently deceased Queen, contributed to the failure of Israel in Egypt at its first performance. Handel quickly revised the work, omitting the opening "Lamentations" section and adding Italian-style arias of the kind contemporary audiences expected and enjoyed. In its two sectioned form, Israel in Egypt was very popular in the 19th century with choral societies. Beginning with John Eliot Gardiner's recording of 1978, many contemporary performances of the work use Handel's original three part version.

== Synopsis ==
=== Part One ===
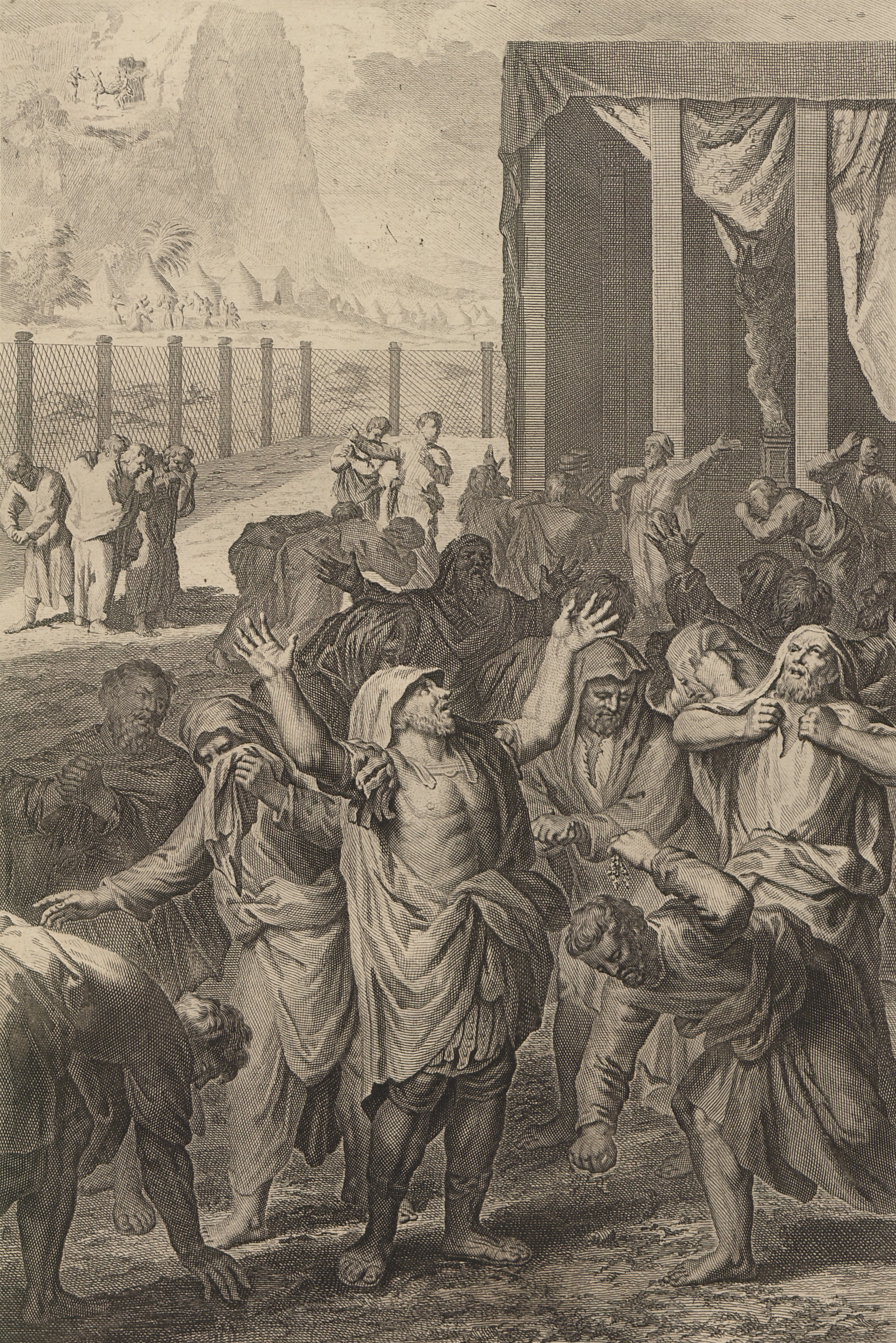
The Israelites Mourn, from a 1728 illustrated Bible

The Israelites mourn the death of Joseph, Israelite and favoured advisor to Pharaoh, King of Egypt. The first part includes the choruses "The Sons of Israel Do Mourn" and "How Is the Mighty Fallen".

=== Part Two ===
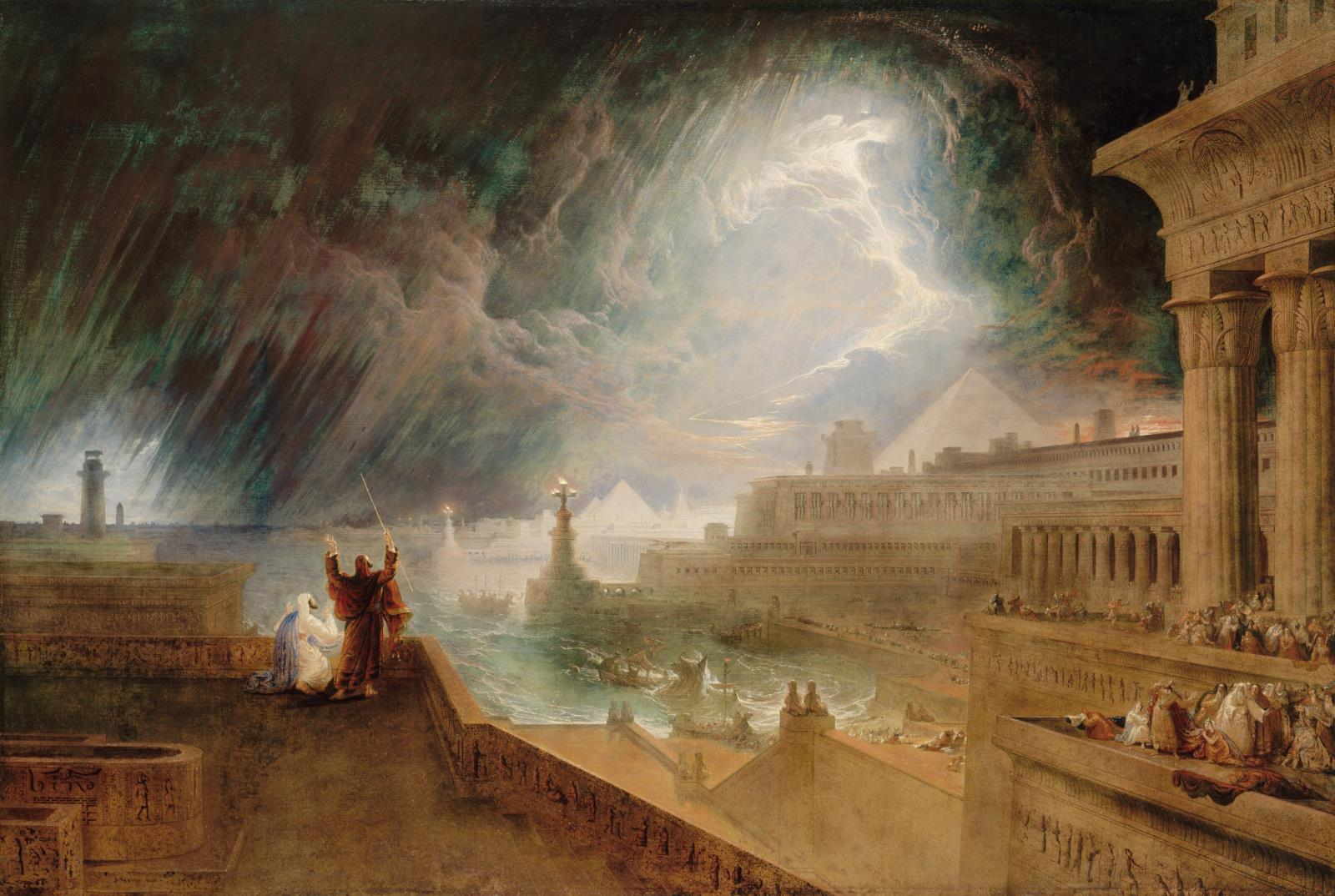
The Seventh Plague of Egypt, by John Martin, 1823

An announcement is made that a new Pharaoh has come to the throne who does not look kindly on the Israelites. God chooses Moses to lead his people out of bondage. A series of plagues falls on Egypt: the rivers turn to blood; a plague of frogs affects the land; lice crawl on man and beast; wild animals destroy everything; the Egyptian livestock get sick and die; blotches and blisters break out on the skin of man and beast; hailstorms blight the country; locusts appear and destroy all the crops; palpable darkness descends; and, finally, the eldest born sons of all the Egyptians are struck down dead. The ruler of Egypt agrees to let the Israelites depart, but changes his mind and pursues them. The Red Sea miraculously parts to let the Israelites cross in safety, but when the pursuing Egyptians try to cross, the waters engulf them, and they are drowned.

=== Part Three ===
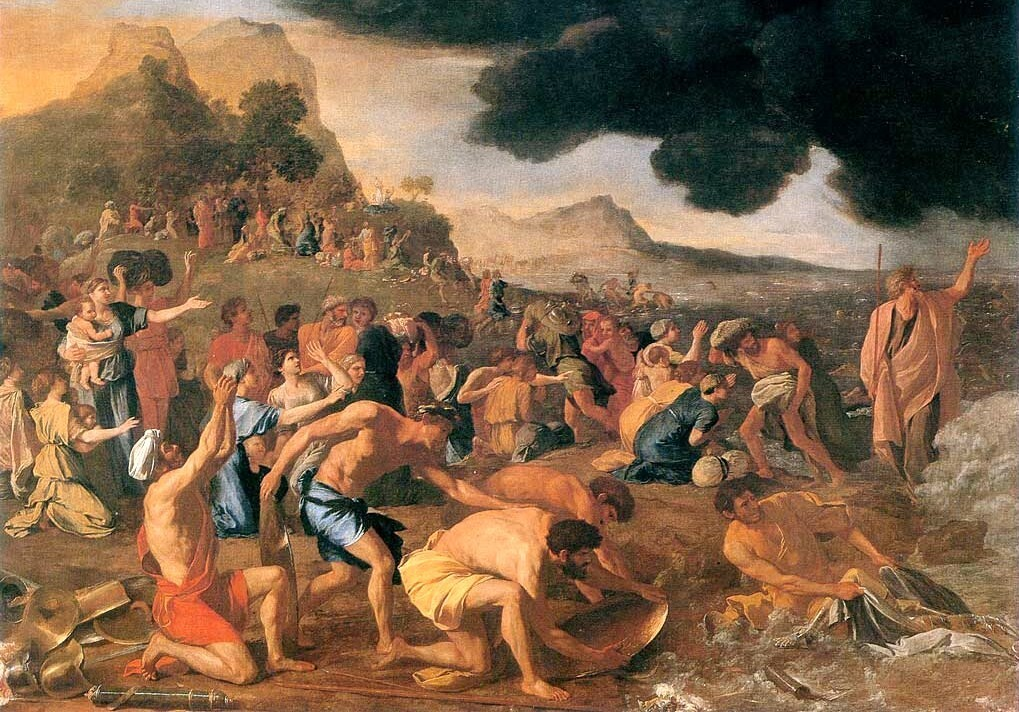
The Crossing of The Red Sea, by Nicolas Poussin

The Israelites celebrate their deliverance. A series of joyful choruses are included in the third part, with the piece concluding with a soprano solo and chorus proclaiming that 'the Lord shall reign for ever and ever' and 'the horse and his rider hath he thrown into the sea'.

== Very early wax cylinder recording of excerpt ==
For a long time, the earliest known recording of music known to still exist was an excerpt from this oratorio conducted by August Manns. The recording was of 4,000 singers singing "Moses and the Children of Israel" in the Crystal Palace Handel Festival of June 29, 1888, recorded by Col. George Gouraud on Edison's yellow paraffin cylinder. The limitations of recording technology at that time, together with the number of voices, the distance of the recording device from the singers (about 100 yards away), and the acoustics of the Crystal Palace, mean that the recorded sound was dim to begin with, and it has since then become badly degraded. What survives is barely audible but still identifiable by ear and gives some insight into performance practices at the height of the Handel Festival phenomenon.

1888 recording of Handel's "Israel In Egypt"
Recorded by George Gouraud at the Crystal Palace Handel Festival of 29 June 1888. Until 2009, this was the earliest known recording.
