= The Fifth Plague of Egypt =

Painting by J. M. W. Turner

- Die fünfte Plage von Ägypten (Die Pest) (German)
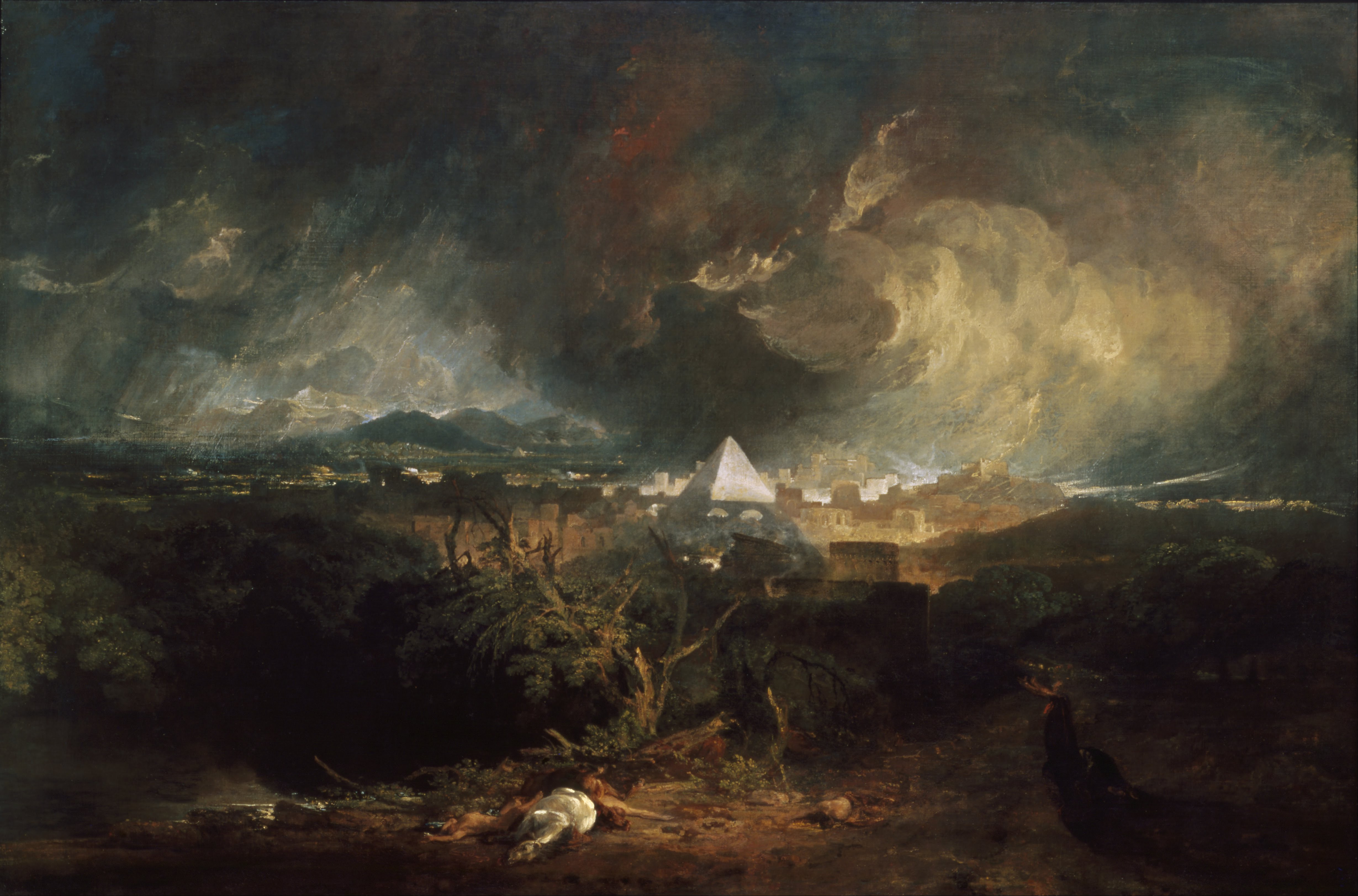
- Artist: J. M. W. Turner
- Year: 1800
- Medium: oil on canvas
- Dimensions: 120 cm × 180 cm (48 in × 72 in)
- Location: Indianapolis Museum of Art, Indianapolis, Indiana
- Website: collections.discovernewfields.org/...42892

The Fifth Plague of Egypt is an 1800 oil painting by Romantic English artist Joseph Mallord William Turner currently in the permanent collection at the Indianapolis Museum of Art. Despite its title, it depicts Moses cursing the Egyptians with a plague of hail and fire, known as the seventh plague. It is one of the first works in which Turner uses an extreme representation of landscape and nature to explore the sublime.

== Description ==
In the foreground, two dead horses and a dead man are piled together, casualties of the earlier plague of pestilence in livestock. To the right, Moses stands with his arms outstretched, cursing the Egyptians with a plague of hail and fire, far away from the engulfed city. In the background, tumultuous clouds swirl above the Egyptian city, which is denoted by the gleaming, white pyramid in the centre of the canvas. Thin, horizontal lines fall from the clouds, showing streaks of hail falling from the sky. The painting is dominated with dark, neutral tones, creating the feeling of gloom.

Although the painting would be categorised as a history painting for its display of a biblical scene, the painting comes across as a landscape painting, clearly demonstrating Turner's training in landscapes. The sky and the scenery take precedence over the figure of Moses and his actions, instead turning him into part of the landscape. The painting shows the force of nature as a more important factor than the force of man, which is minuscule.

== Historical information ==
Turner describes the seventh plague of Egypt that God cursed upon the Egyptians for punishment of not releasing the Israelites from slavery, as described in the Old Testament Book of Exodus, 9:13–35. Turner possibly mislabelled this painting as the wrong plague when he submitted it, but the title has not changed.

Turner submitted this large-scale painting to the annual Royal Academy exhibition in London in 1800. The twenty-four-year-old Turner was eager to impress the London art critics, with the largest canvas submitted by a young artist. He attempted to show his virtuosity as a history painter, even when his landscape painting background is entirely evident. Turner had only been accepted into the Royal Academy as an Associate Member in 1799, and was eager to show his place.

=== Acquisition ===
The painting was purchased from Turner by William Beckford in April 1800. Henry Jeffrey purchased the painting in 1807, before selling it to Thomas Tutor. George Young acquired the painting by 1853, and it was at sale at Christie's in London in 1866. The painting was purchased by Hugh Grosvenor, Earl Grosvenor in 1866 and stayed in his possession until at least 1871. In 1876, the painting was bought by Sir Francis Cook, remaining in the Cook Collection until 1951. It was sold to Sir Alexander Korda by the Cook family. John Mitchell bought the painting in 1955; the IMA purchased the painting in the same year from Mitchell with funds from the Lilly family.

== See also ==
- The Tenth Plague of Egypt, an 1802 painting by Turner
- The Seventh Plague of Egypt, an 1823 painting by John Martin
- List of paintings by J. M. W. Turner
- List of artworks at the Indianapolis Museum of Art
