= Robert Kanzow Bowley =

Robert Kanzow Bowley (13 May 1813 – 25 August 1870), was an English amateur musician, and later an early music administrator.

== Biography ==
Bowley, the son of a boot maker with a substantial boot and shoe business at 52/53 Charing Cross. He trained in his father's business, and succeeded him in it. His first knowledge of music was acquired by association with the choristers of Westminster Abbey. Ardent and enthusiastic, he pursued his studies vigorously. Whilst still a youth he joined a small society called 'The Benevolent Society of Musical Amateurs,' of which he afterwards became conductor. In 1834, he was one of the committee who promoted and carried out the 'Amateur Musical Festival' at Exeter Hall. About the same time he became organist of the Independent Chapel in Orange Street, Leicester Square, and continued in that role for several years.

In October 1834, he was admitted a member of the Sacred Harmonic Society, then in its infancy, and was soon afterwards elected a member of its committee. On the foundation of the society's musical library in 1837, Bowley was appointed its librarian. He remained the librarian until 1854, when he became treasurer, a role he retained until his death. He promoted the society's welfare and advanced its reputation.

He originated the celebration of the centenary of the death of Handel, putting on performances of Handel's music on a scale of unprecedented magnitude. In 1856, he was the originator of the gigantic Handel festivals that were subsequently held every three years at the Crystal Palace from 1857 onwards. The festivals featured orchestras of 400 musicians and an audience of up to 12,000. In 1858, he was appointed General Manager of the Crystal Palace. All sorts of events were held there, including firework displays, cat and dog shows, cricket and football matches. A one-off Olympic Games was staged at Crystal Palace in 1866 and in that same year, the north transept burnt down. The building was not adequately insured to cover the cost of rebuilding in full.

Bowley held the position of General Manager until his death. It has been stated that he discharged his duties in an energetic and self-devoted manner.

At the inquest following his death, it was determined that a succession of personal tragedies and the pressures of work had led to him taking his own life. He was reported to have jumped from a ferry into the River Thames on 25 August 1870. He was 57 years old.
