= The Tenth Plague of Egypt =

Painting by J. M. W. Turner

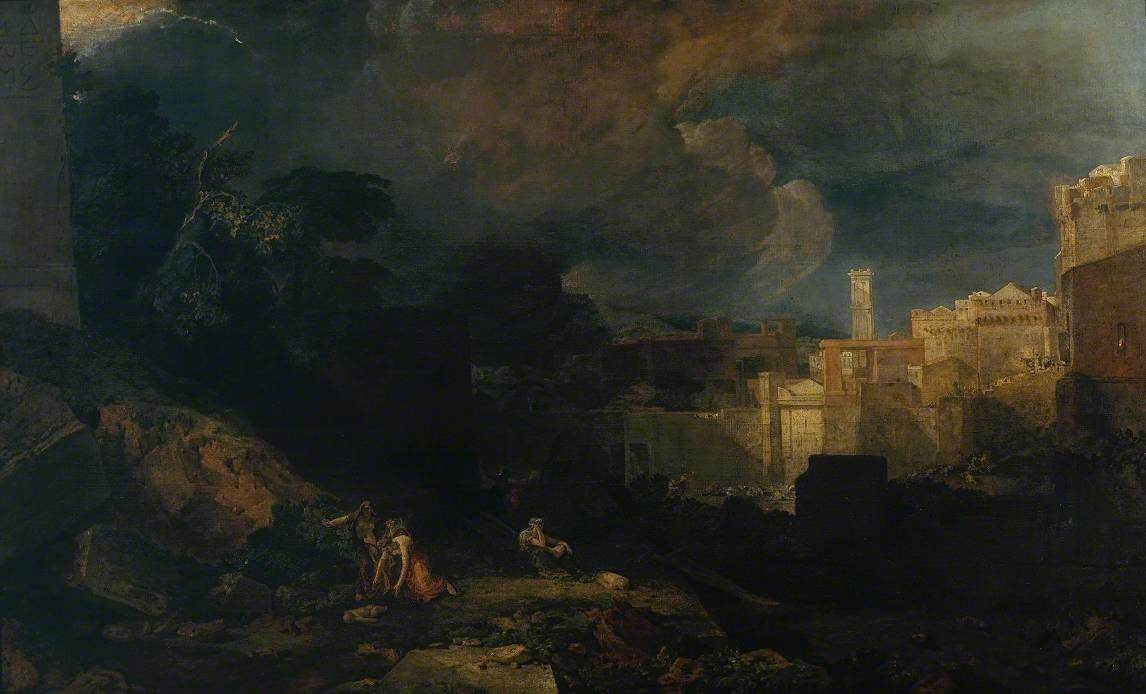
- Artist: J.M.W. Turner
- Year: 1802
- Type: Oil on canvas, landscape painting
- Dimensions: 143.5 cm × 236.2 cm (56.5 in × 93.0 in)
- Location: Tate Britain, London
- Website: www.tate.org.uk/...n00470

The Tenth Plague of Egypt is an 1802 oil painting by the British artist J.M.W. Turner. Blending landscape and history painting, it depicts the tenth of the biblical plagues to strike Ancient Egypt in punishment for the enslavement of the Israelites causing the death of all the firstborn sons, including that of Pharaoh who had refused to let the Israelites go free. Turner took inspiration from the Old Master Nicolas Poussin for the background. A terrifying storm whips across the scene, reinforcing the despair of the mothers seen with their dead children. The backdrop appears to be an Italian hill town, although the towers resemble both those of the Medieval era and the much older Etruscan civilisation.

The painting was displayed at the Royal Academy Exhibition of 1802 at Somerset House in London, the first to be held following Turner's full election as a member of the Royal Academy. Part of the Turner Bequest of 1856, it is now in the collection of the Tate Britain in Pimlico.

== See also ==
- The Fifth Plague of Egypt, an 1800 painting by Turner
- List of paintings by J. M. W. Turner

== Bibliography ==
- Bailey, Anthony. J.M.W. Turner: Standing in the Sun. Tate Enterprises Ltd, 2013.
- Hamilton, James. Turner's Britain. Merrell, 2003
- Reynolds, Graham. Turner. Thames & Hudson, 2022.
