= Plagues of Egypt =

Ten disasters inflicted by God on Egypt in the story of the Exodus

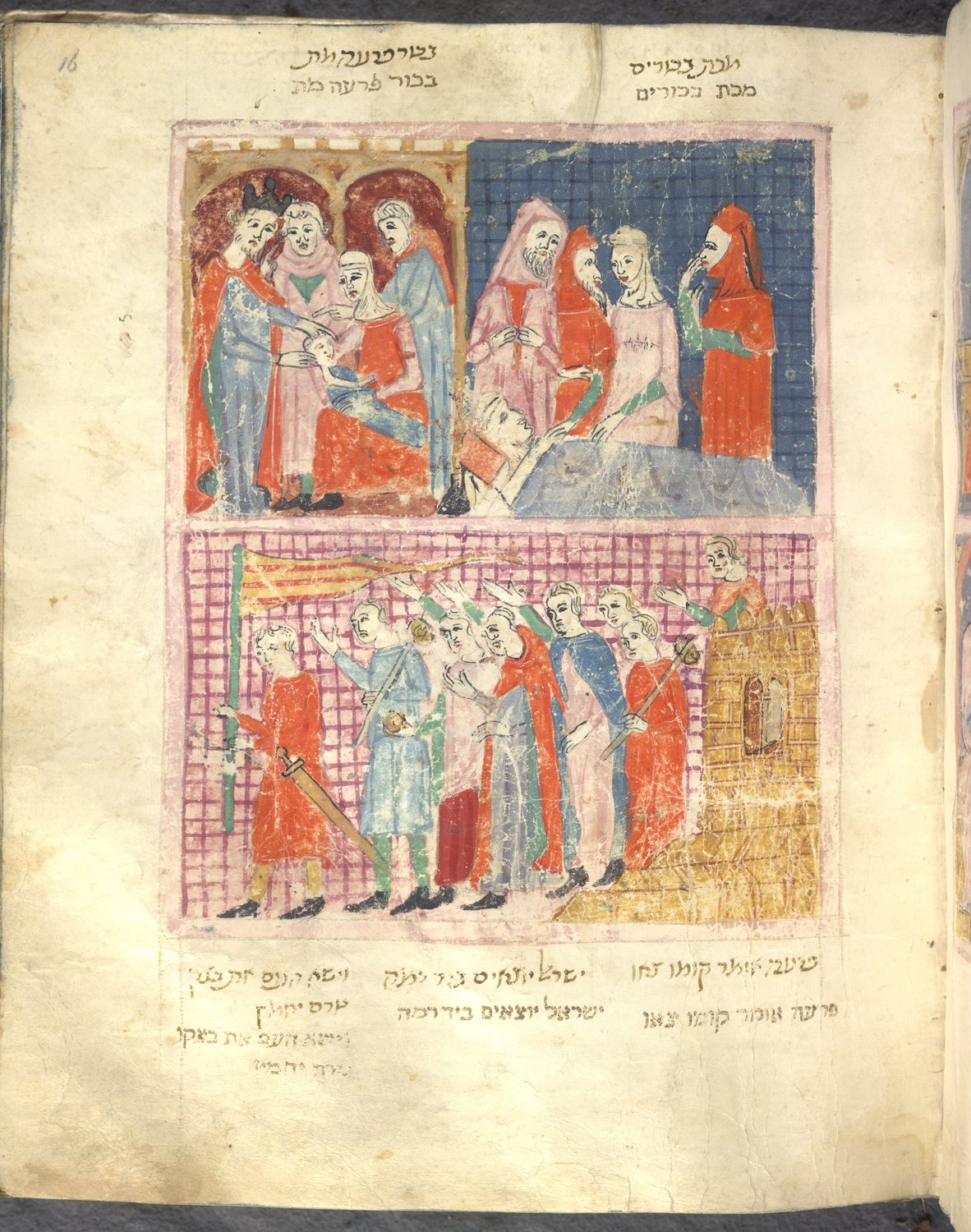
Scenes from the Book of Exodus: The death of the firstborns (including the Pharaoh's son), and the Israelites leaving Egypt (Haggadah shel Pesaḥ, 1325–1374 CE, Barcelona via British Library)

In the Book of Exodus, the Plagues of Egypt (Hebrew: מכות מצרים) were ten disasters that Yahweh inflicted on the Egyptians to convince the Pharaoh to emancipate the enslaved Israelites, each of them confronting the Pharaoh and one of his Egyptian gods; they served as "signs and marvels" given by Yahweh in response to the Pharaoh's taunt that he did not know Yahweh: "The Egyptians shall know that I am the LORD". These Plagues are recited by Jews during the Passover Seder.

The consensus of modern scholars is that the Pentateuch does not give an accurate account of the origins of the Israelites. Similarly, attempts to find natural explanations for the plagues (e.g., a volcanic eruption to explain the "darkness" plague) have been dismissed by biblical scholars on the grounds that their pattern, timing, rapid succession, and above all, control by Moses mark them as supernatural.

== List of The Ten Plagues ==
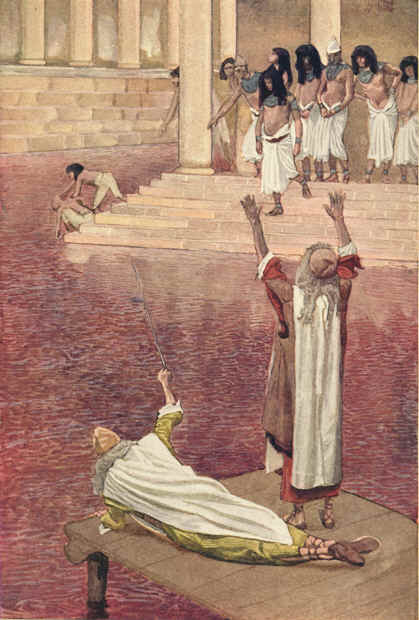
The first plague: Water Is Changed into Blood, James Tissot

=== Plague One: The Nile to Blood ===
This is what the LORD says: By this you will know that I am the LORD: With the staff that is in my hands I will strike the water of the Nile, and it will be changed into blood. The fish in the Nile will die, and the river will stink and the Egyptians will not be able to drink its water.

— Exodus 7:17–18

The Hebrew Bible's Book of Exodus says that Moses turned the Nile to blood by striking it with his staff. Pharaoh's magicians used their secret arts to also strike the Nile, creating a second layer of blood. In addition to the Nile, all water that was held in reserve, such as jars, was also transformed into blood. The Egyptians were forced to dig alongside the bank of the Nile, which still had pure water. One week passed before the plague dissipated.

=== Plague Two: The Invasion of Frogs ===
This is what the great LORD says: Let my people go, so that they may worship me. If you refuse to let them go, I will plague your whole country with frogs. The Nile will teem with frogs. They will come up into your palace and your bedroom and onto your bed, into the houses of your officials and on your people, and into your ovens and kneading troughs. The frogs will go up on you and your people and all your officials.

— Exodus 8:1–4

Exodus states that God ordered frogs to emerge from the Nile, which then jumped around virtually everywhere in Egypt. The magicians attempted to produce frogs from their secret arts, conjuring up a second wave of frogs. Even the private quarters of Pharaoh was infested with frogs. Three days passed before all the frogs died. The Egyptians had to do much work to rid themselves of the corpses, and the land stank of frog for long afterwards. When the decision came for Pharaoh about the slaves, the Pharaoh hardened his heart and decided that the slaves would not be freed.

=== Plague Three: Gnats From the Dust ===
"And the LORD said [...] Stretch out thy rod, and smite the dust of the land, that it may become gnats throughout all the land of Egypt." [...] When Aaron stretched out his hand with the rod and struck the dust of the ground, gnats came upon men and animals. All the dust throughout the land of Egypt became lice.

— Exodus 8:16–17

=== Plague Four: Teems of Flies or Wild Animals ===
Thus says the LORD: Let my people go, so that they may worship me. For if you will not let my people go, I will send swarms of flies on you, your officials, and your people, and into your houses; and the houses of the Egyptians shall be filled with swarms of flies; so also the land where they live. But on that day I will set apart the land of Goshen, where my people live, so that no swarms of flies shall be there, that you may know that I the LORD am in this land. Thus I will make a distinction between my people and your people. This sign shall appear tomorrow.

— Exodus 8:20-23

The fourth plague of Egypt was of creatures capable of harming people and livestock. Exodus states that the plagues only came against the Egyptians and did not affect the Hebrews. Pharaoh asked Moses to remove this plague and promised to grant the Israelites their freedom. However, after the plague was gone, Pharaoh refused to keep his promise, as his heart was hardened by God.

Various sources use either "wild animals" or "flies".

=== Plague Five: The Pestilence of Livestock ===
This is what the LORD, the God of the Hebrews, says: Let my people go, so that they may worship me. If you refuse to let them go and continue to hold them back, the hand of the LORD will bring a terrible plague on your livestock in the field—on your horses and donkeys and camels and on your cattle and sheep and goats.

— Exodus 9:1–3

=== Plague Six: The Infection of Boils ===
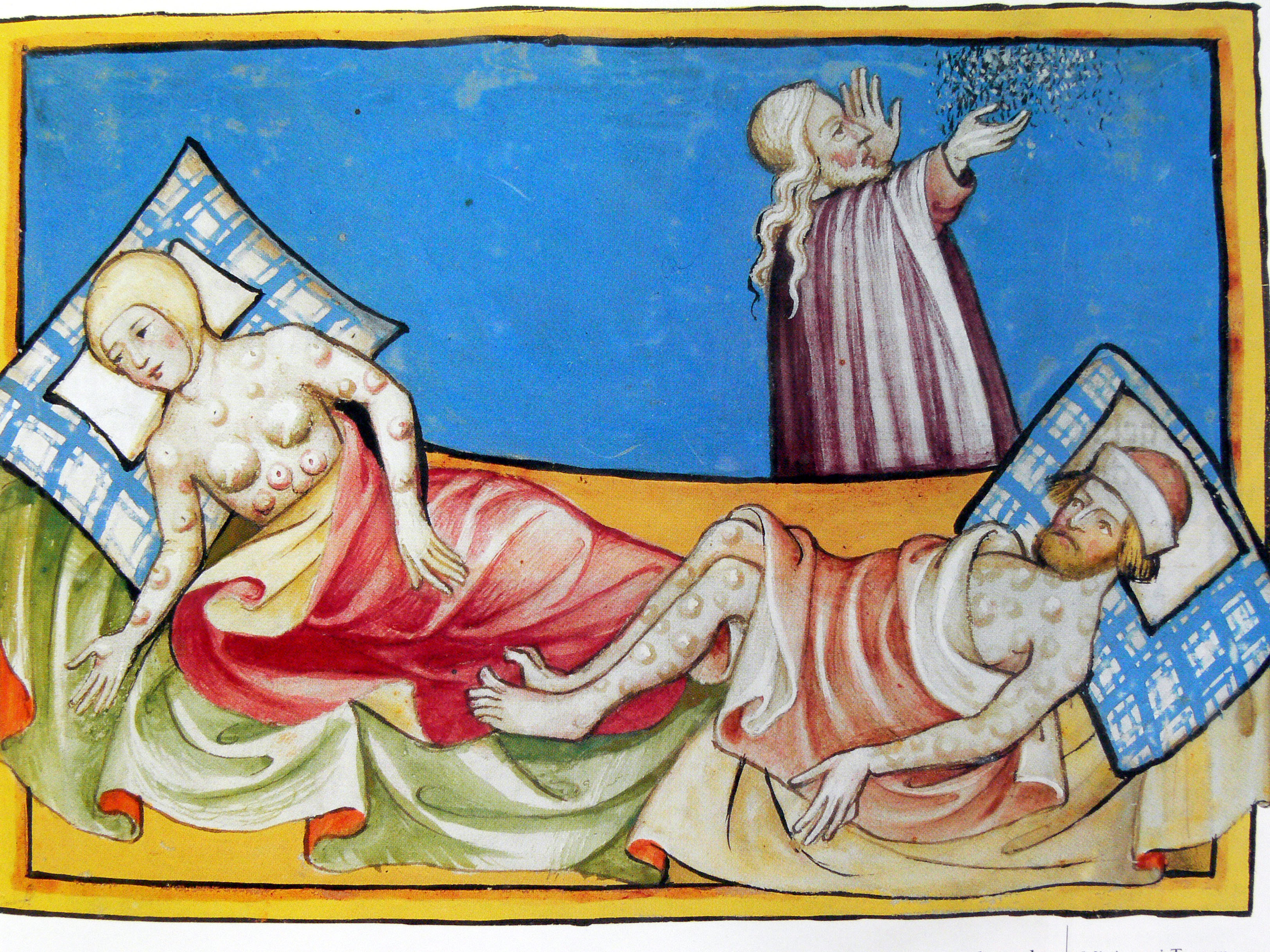
The sixth plague: miniature out of the Toggenburg Bible, created c. 1411. Commonly the picture is mistaken as a depiction of the Black Death.

Then the LORD said to Moses and Aaron, "Take handfuls of soot from a furnace and have Moses toss it into the air in the presence of Pharaoh. It will become fine dust over the whole land of Egypt, and festering boils will break out on men and animals throughout the land."

— Exodus 9:8–9

=== Plague Seven: The Storm of Hail ===
This is what the LORD, the God of the Hebrews, says: Let my people go, so that they may worship me, or this time I will send the full force of my plagues against you and against your officials and your people, so you may know that there is no one like me in all the earth. For by now I could have stretched out my hand and struck you and your people with a plague that would have wiped you off the earth. But I have raised you up for this very purpose, that I might show you my power and that my name might be proclaimed in all the earth. You still set yourself against my people and will not let them go. Therefore, at this time tomorrow I will send the worst hailstorm that has ever fallen on Egypt, from the day it was founded till now. Give an order now to bring your livestock and everything you have in the field to a place of shelter, because the hail will fall on every man and animal that has not been brought in and is still out in the field, and they will die. [...] The LORD sent thunder and hail, and lightning flashed down to the ground. So the LORD rained hail on the land of Egypt; hail fell and lightning flashed back and forth. It was the worst storm in all the land of Egypt since it had become a nation.

— Exodus 9:13–24

=== Plague Eight: Swarms of Locusts ===
This is what the LORD, the God of the Hebrews, says: 'How long will you refuse to humble yourself before me? Let my people go, so that they may worship me. If you refuse to let them go, I will bring locusts into your country tomorrow. They will cover the face of the ground so that it cannot be seen. They will devour what little you have left after the hail, including every tree that is growing in your fields. They will fill your houses and those of all your officials and all the Egyptians—something neither your fathers nor your forefathers have ever seen from the day they settled in this land till now.

— Exodus 10:3–6

=== Plague Nine: Three Days of Darkness ===
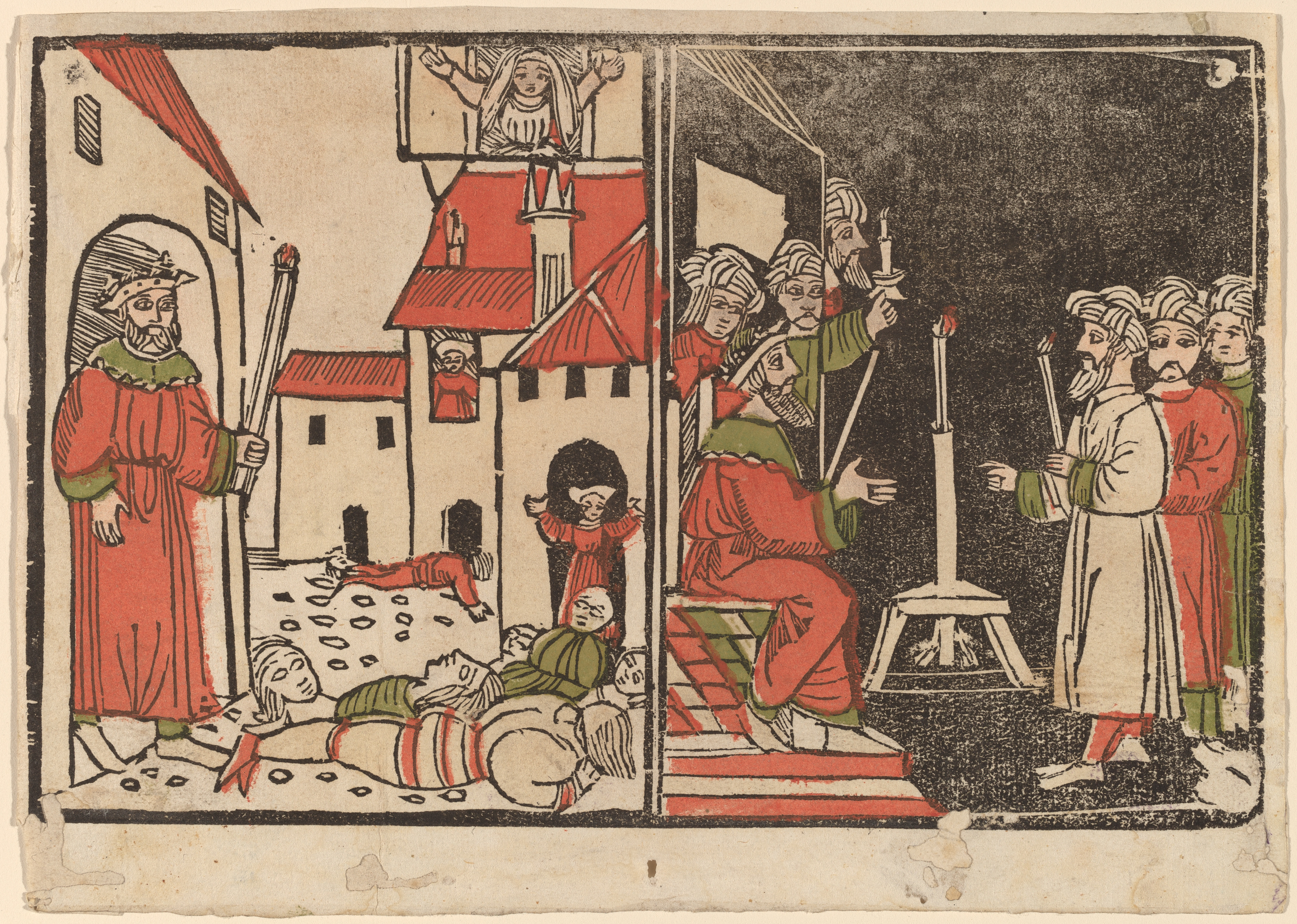
Spanish 15th century, Massacre of the Firstborn and Egyptian Darkness, c. 1490, hand-colored woodcut

Then the LORD said to Moses, "Stretch out your hand toward the sky so that darkness will spread over Egypt—darkness that can be felt." So Moses stretched out his hand toward the sky, and total darkness covered all Egypt for three days. No one could see anyone else or leave his place for three days.

— Exodus 10:21–23

=== Plague Ten: Death of the Firstborn ===
This is what the LORD says: "About midnight I will go throughout Egypt. Every firstborn in Egypt will die, from the firstborn of Pharaoh, who sits on the throne, to the firstborn of the slave girl, who is at her hand mill, and all the firstborn of the cattle as well. There will be loud wailing throughout Egypt—worse than there has ever been or ever will be again."

— Exodus 11:4–6

Before this final plague, God commands Moses to tell the Israelites to mark a lamb's blood above their doors in order that He will pass over them (i.e., that they will not be touched by the death of the firstborn). Pharaoh orders the Israelites to leave, taking whatever they want, and asks Moses to bless him in the name of the Lord. The passage goes on to state that the passover sacrifice recalls the time when the Lord "passed over the houses of the Israelites in Egypt".

== Composition and theology ==
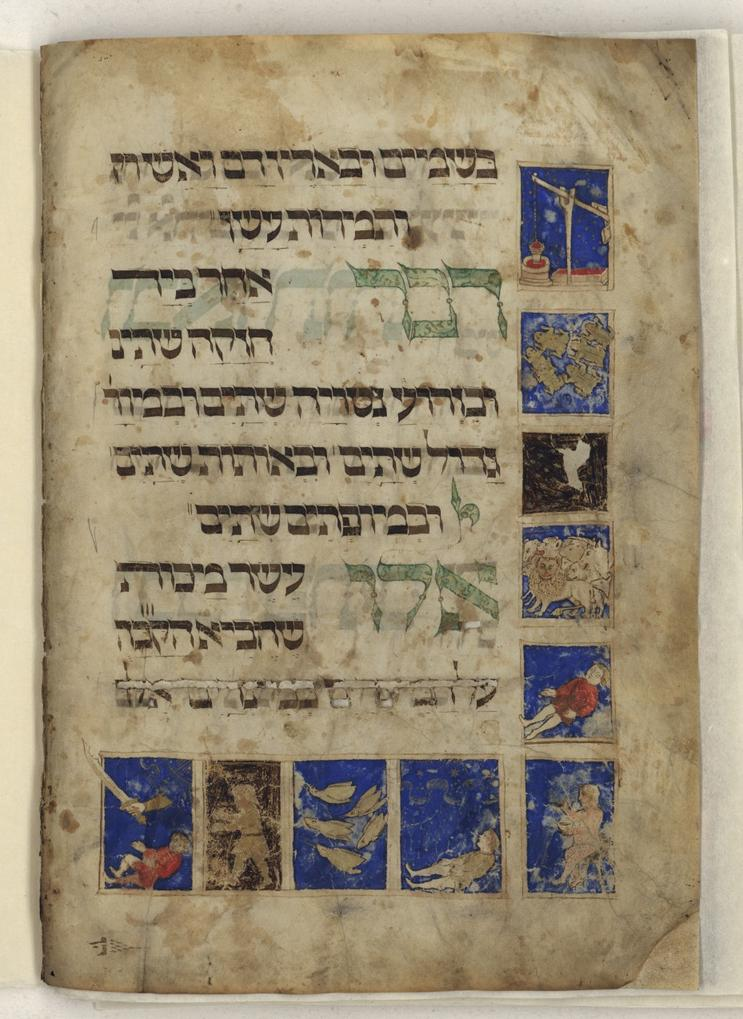
Page from the Rothschild Haggadah depicting the plagues, from the collections of the National Library of Israel

Scholars are in broad agreement that the publication of the Torah took place in the mid-Persian period (the 5th century BCE). The Book of Deuteronomy, composed in stages between the 7th and 6th centuries, mentions the "diseases of Egypt" (Deuteronomy 7:15 and 28:60). John Van Seters contends that this refers to something that afflicted the Israelites, not the Egyptians, and that Deuteronomy never specifies the plagues. Graham Davies, however, questions Van Seters' interpretation and argues that several verses in the book (e.g. Deuteronomy 6:22; 11:2–3) seem to clearly allude to a plague tradition.

The traditional number of ten plagues is not actually mentioned in Exodus, and other sources differ; Psalms 78 and 105 seem to list only seven or eight plagues and order them differently. It appears that originally there were only seven, to which were added the third, sixth, and ninth, bringing the count to ten.

In this final version, the first nine plagues form three triads, each of which God introduces by informing Moses of the main lesson it will teach. In the first triad, the Egyptians begin to experience the power of God; in the second, God demonstrates that he is directing events; and in the third, the incomparability of Yahweh is displayed. Overall, the plagues are "signs and marvels" given by the God of Israel to answer Pharaoh's taunt that he does not know Yahweh: "The Egyptians shall know that I am the LORD".

Jan-Wim Wesellius argues by identifying supposed parallels that the plagues are based on the account of Xerxes's campaigns against Greece, as recorded by Herodotus.

== Historicity ==
Modern scholars broadly agree that the Exodus is not a historical account of the origins of the Israelites. According to Avraham Faust, this view extends only as far as a reconstruction of an Exodus based on similar collective memories is unlikely if it is solely based on either Egyptian presence in Late Bronze Age Canaan or the foreign Hyksos rulers of Egypt, and rules out Midian human activity "which cannot help in dating the Exodus" in identification of the proto-Israelites. Agreeing in treating the expulsion of the Hyksos "not as related to the flight of a group of slaves[,]" Manfred Bietak points out that the portrayal of the Hyksos as a ruling elite with a background in trade and seafaring conflicts with the biblical portrayal of the Israelites as oppressed in Egypt. Some scholars also hold that the Israelites originated in Canaan and from the Canaanites, although others disagree.

John Van Seters poses that the plagues of Egypt are a late literary invention by Biblical writers, rather than historical events or ancient folklore. In his argumentation, he contends Neo-Assyrian vassal treaties with their long list of curses for those who break their covenants were drawn upon, alongside other Near-Eastern motifs.

The Ipuwer Papyrus, written no earlier than the late Twelfth Dynasty of Egypt (c. 1991–1803 BCE), has been put forward in popular literature as confirmation of the biblical account, most notably because of its statement that "the river is blood" and its frequent references to servants running away; however, these arguments ignore the many points on which Ipuwer contradicts Exodus, such as Asiatics arriving in Egypt and that the "river is blood" phrase probably refers to red sediment during the Nile's periodic floods, or is simply a poetic image of turmoil.

Attempts to find natural explanations for the plagues (e.g., a volcanic eruption to explain the "darkness" plague) have been dismissed by biblical scholars on the grounds that their pattern, timing, rapid succession, and above all, control by Moses mark them as supernatural.

Some scholars have suggested that the story of the Plagues of Egypt might have been inspired by natural phenomena like epidemics, although these theories are considered uncertain.

== Artistic representation ==
=== Visual art ===
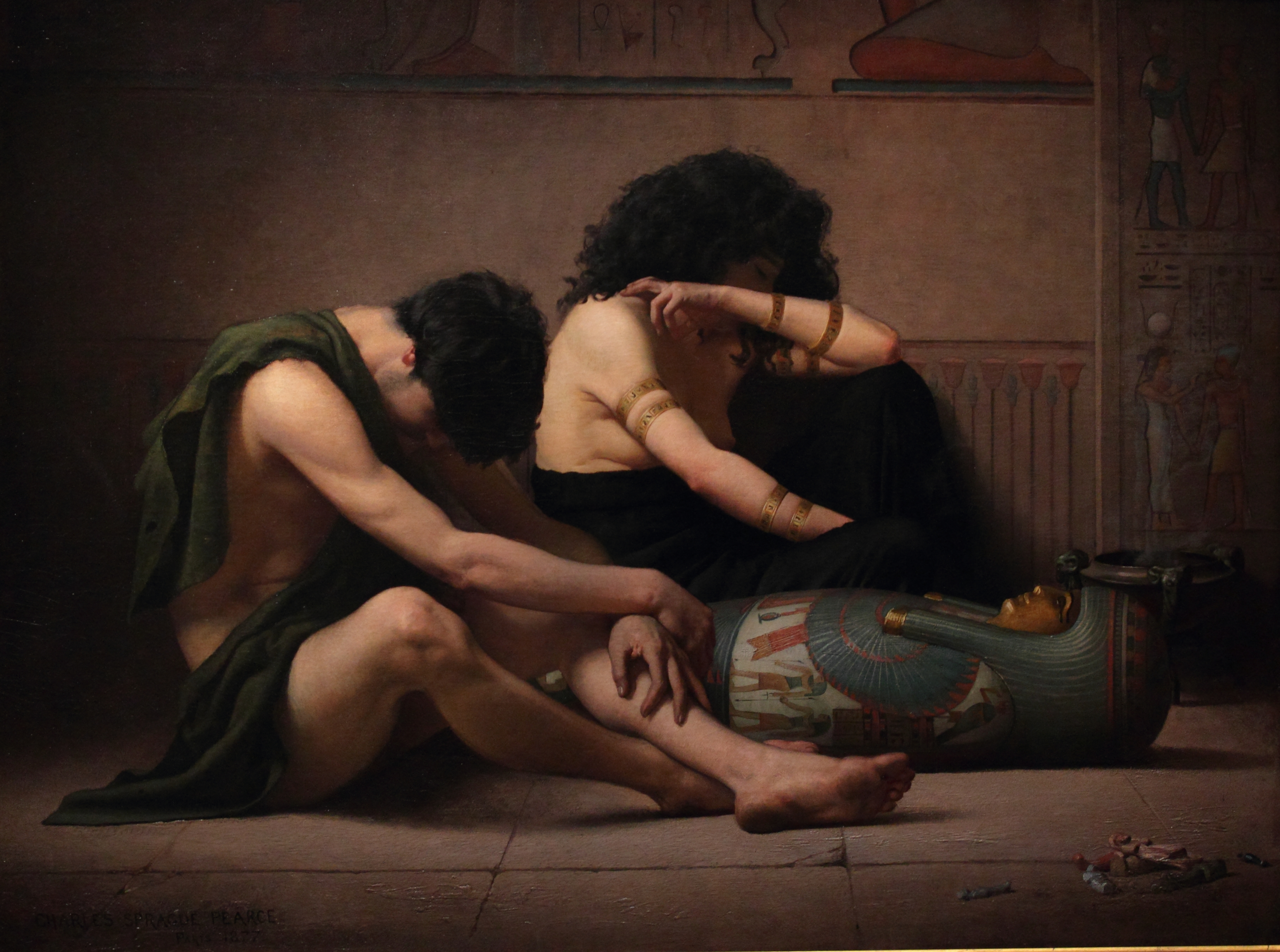
Lamentations over the Death of the First-Born of Egypt by Charles Sprague Pearce (1877)

In visual art, the plagues have generally been reserved for works in series, especially engravings. Still, relatively few depictions in art emerged compared to other religious themes until the 19th century, when the plagues became more common subjects, with John Martin and Joseph Turner producing notable canvases. This trend probably reflected a Romantic attraction to landscape and nature painting, for which the plagues were suited, a Gothic attraction to morbid stories, and a rise in Orientalism, wherein exotic Egyptian themes found currency. Given the importance of noble patronage throughout Western art history, the plagues may have found consistent disfavor because the stories emphasize the limits of a monarch's power, and images of lice, locusts, darkness, and boils were ill-suited for decoration in palaces and churches.

=== Music ===
Perhaps the most successful artistic representation of the plagues is Handel's oratorio Israel in Egypt, which, like "Handel's Messiah", takes a libretto entirely from scripture. The work was especially popular in the 19th century because of its numerous choruses, generally one for each plague, and its playful musical depiction of the plagues. For example, the plague of frogs is performed as a light aria for alto, depicting frogs jumping in the violins, and the plague of flies and lice is a light chorus with fast scurrying runs in the violins.

Another representation of the plagues, mainly the 10th plague, is the song "Creeping Death" by American thrash metal band Metallica.

=== Documentaries ===
- The Exodus Decoded (2006)

=== Films ===
- The Ten Commandments (1923)
- The Moon of Israel (1924)
- The Ten Commandments (1956)
- The Abominable Dr. Phibes (1971)
- The Seventh Sign (1988)
- Moses (1995)
- The Prince of Egypt (1998)
- Magnolia (1999)
- The Mummy (1999)
- The Reaping (2007)
- The Ten Commandments (2007)
- Exodus: Gods and Kings (2014)
- Seder-Masochism (2018)

== Gallery ==
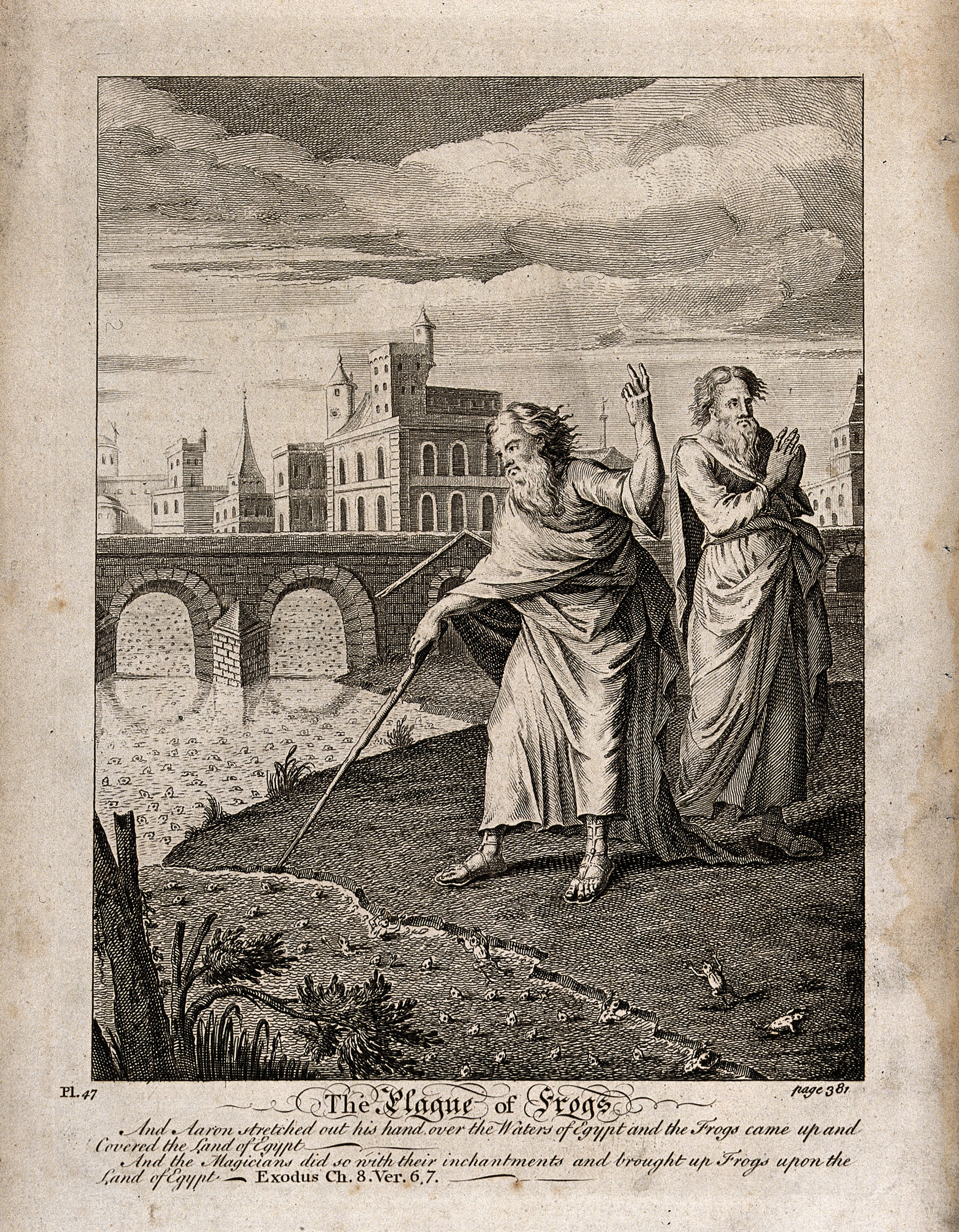
The Second Plague: Frogs came up and covered the Sand of Egypt

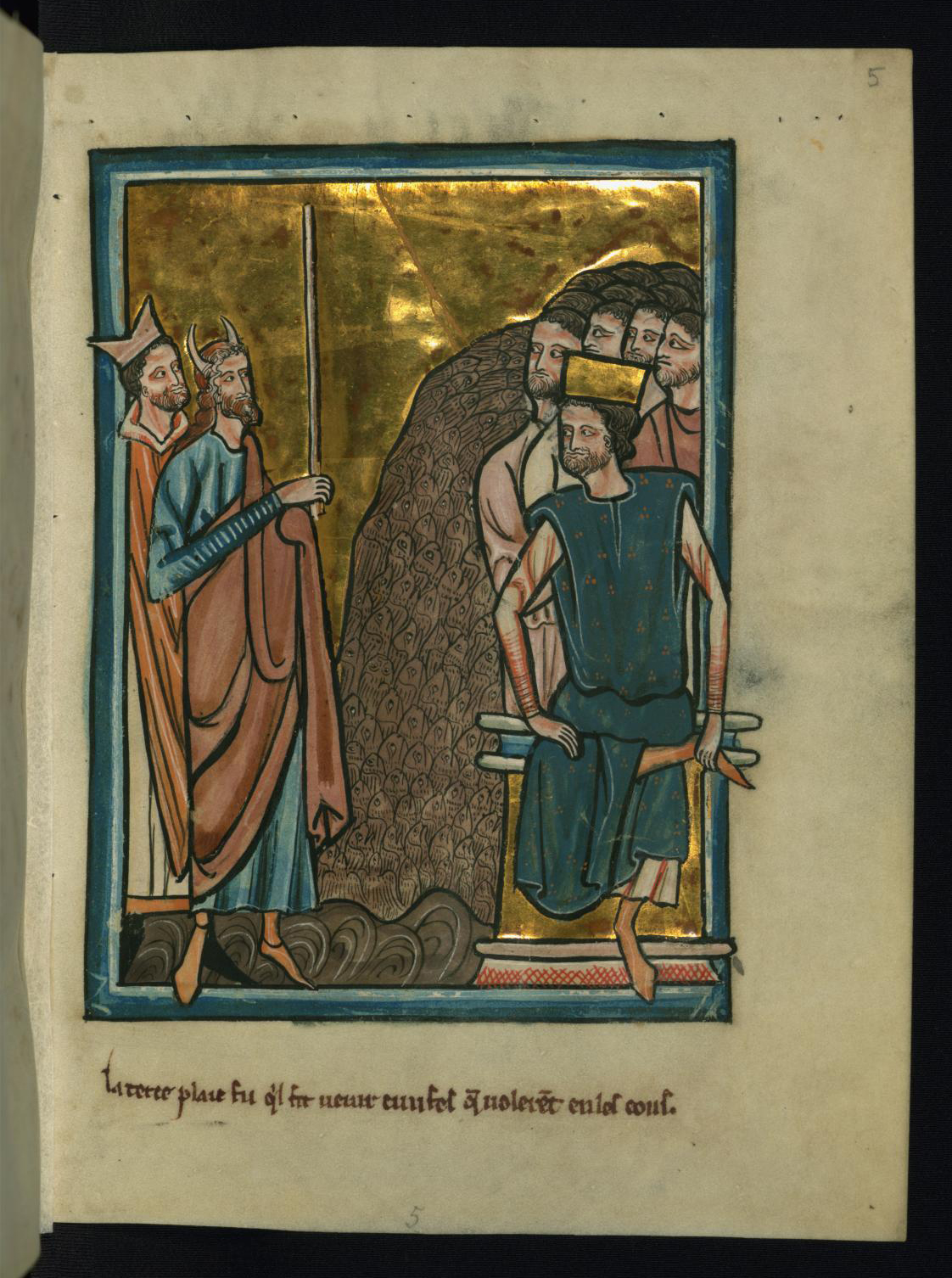
The Third Plague - Gnats

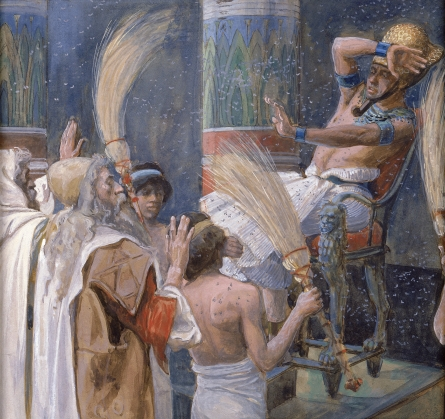
The Fourth Plague: The Plague of Flies, James Jacques Joseph Tissot, Jewish Museum, New York

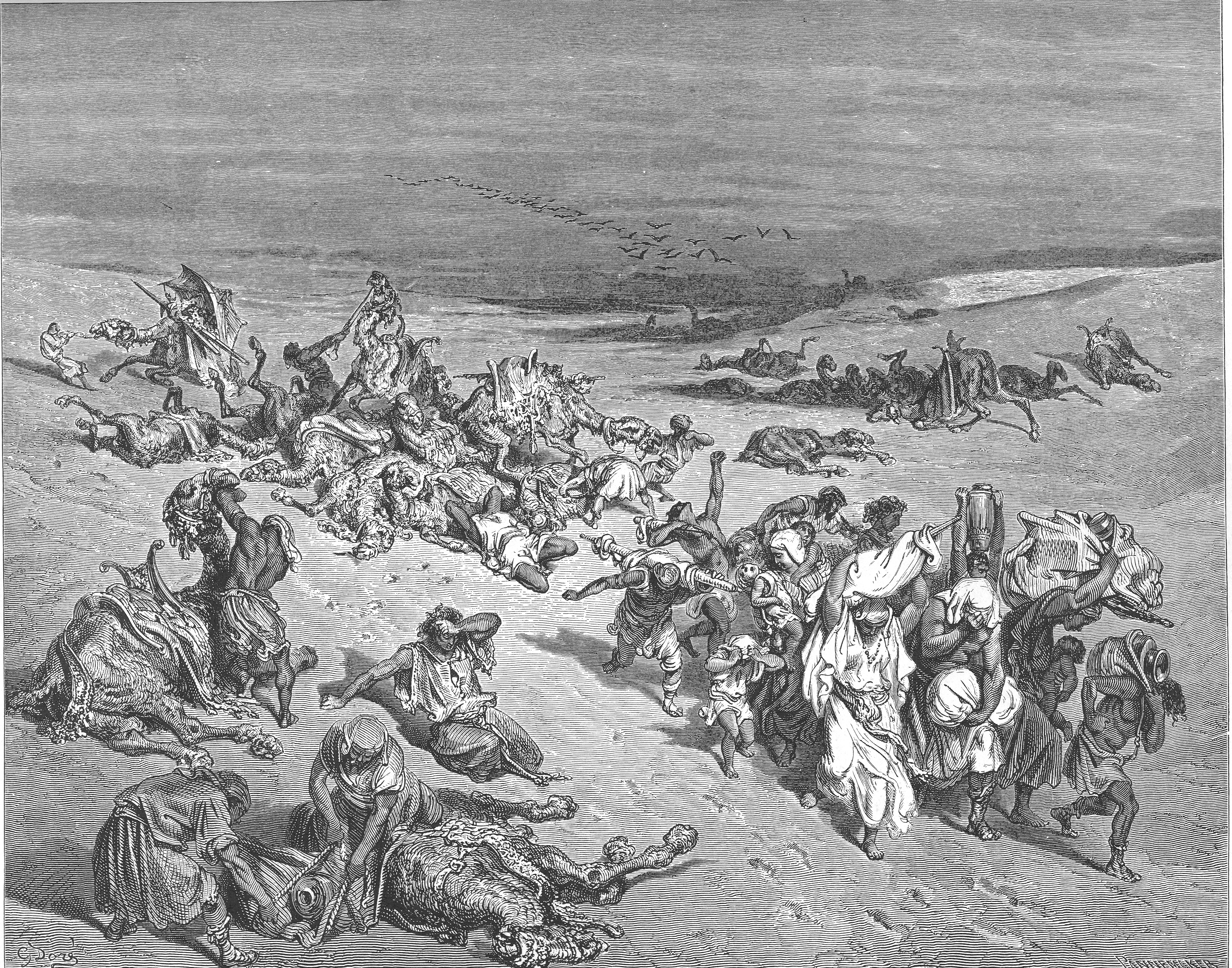
The Fifth Plague: Pestilence of livestock, by Gustave Doré

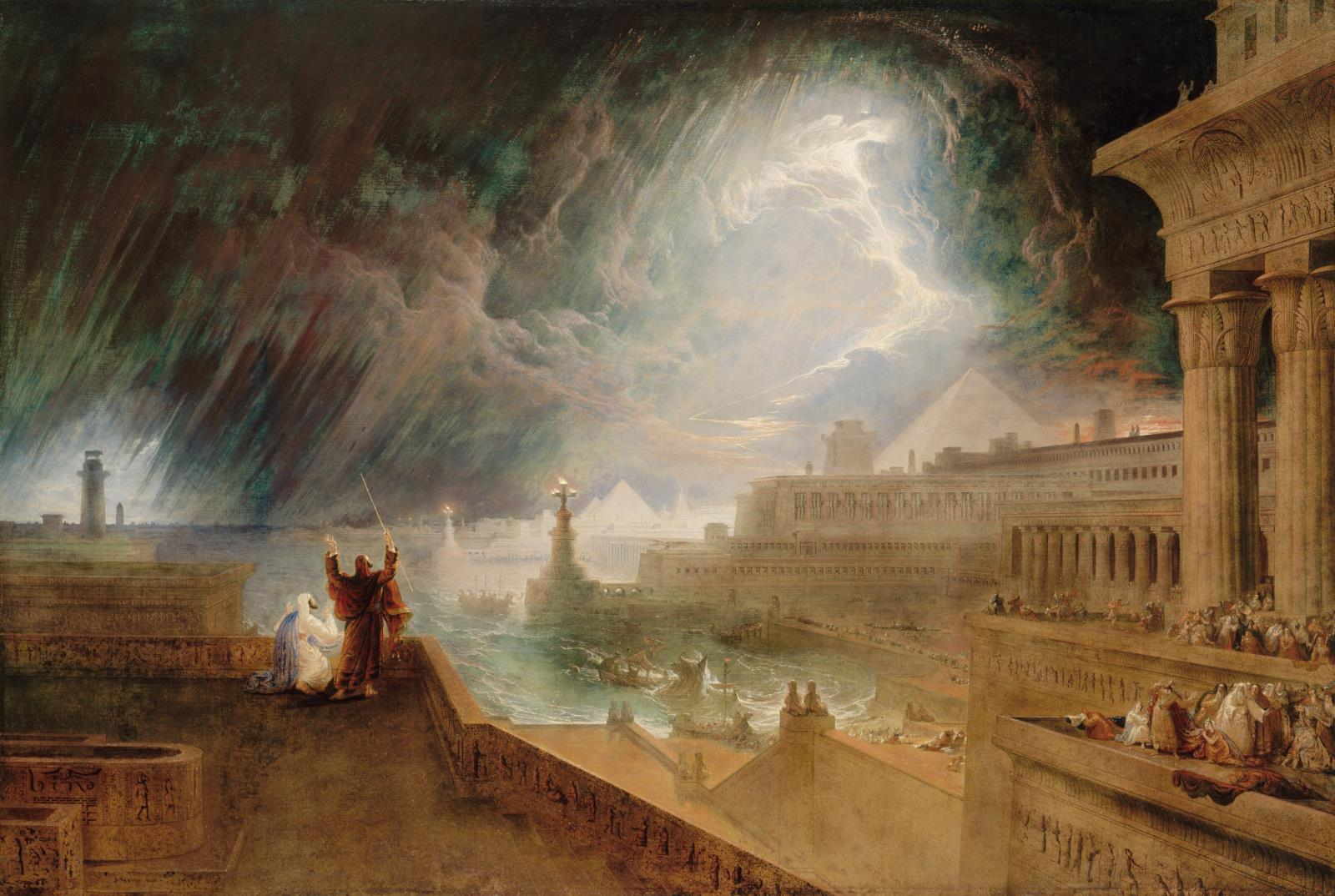
The Seventh Plague of Egypt by John Martin (1823)

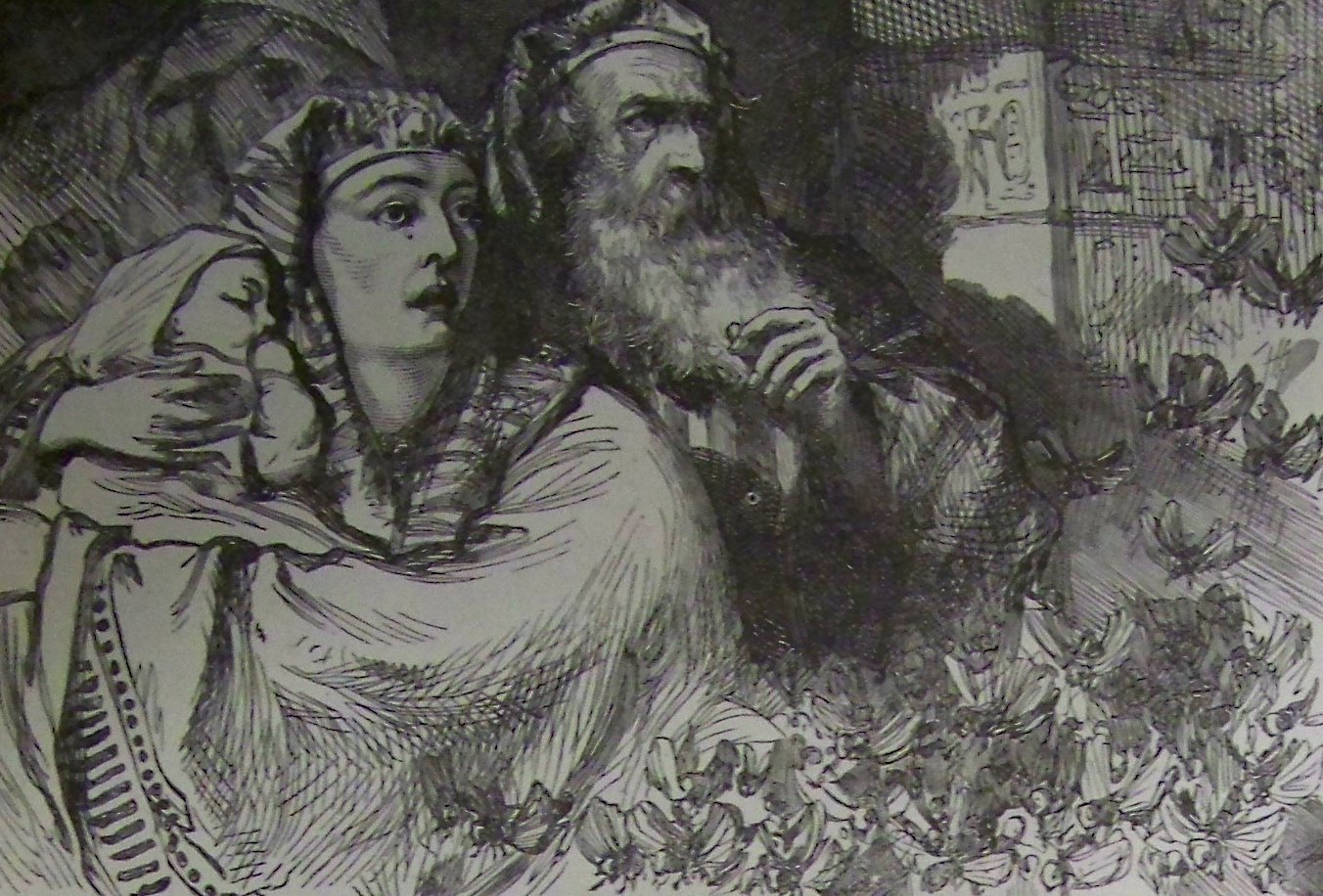
The Eighth Plague: "The Plague of Locusts", illustration from the 1890 Holman Bible

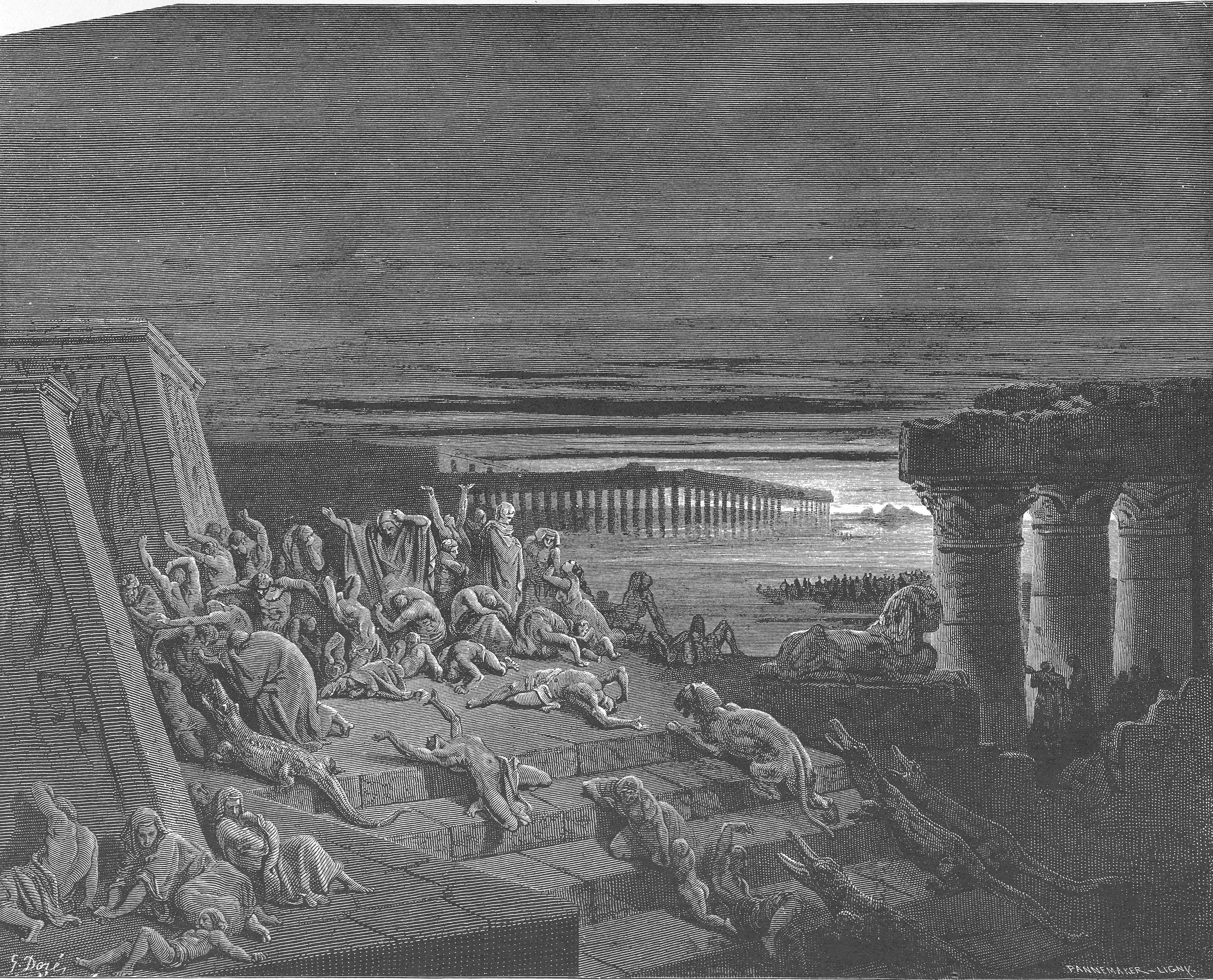
The Ninth Plague: Darkness by Gustave Doré

== See also ==
- Aaron's rod
- Jochebed
- Miriam

== Sources ==
- Bietak, Manfred (2015). "On the Historicity of the Exodus: What Egyptology Today Can Contribute to Assessing the Biblical Account of the Sojourn in Egypt". In Thomas E. Levy; Thomas Schneider; William H.C. Propp (eds.). Israel's Exodus in Transdisciplinary Perspective: Text, Archaeology, Culture, and Geoscience. Springer. pp. 17–37. ISBN 978-3-319-04768-3.
- Collins, John J. (2005). The Bible After Babel: Historical Criticism in a Postmodern Age. Eerdmans. ISBN 9780802828927.
- Davies, Graham I. (2020). Exodus 1-18: A Critical and Exegetical Commentary: Volume 1: Chapters 1-10. International Critical Commentary. Bloomsbury Publishing. ISBN 978-0-567-68869-9.
- Davies, Graham I. (2020b). Exodus 1-18: A Critical and Exegetical Commentary: Volume 2: Chapters 11-18. International Critical Commentary. Bloomsbury Publishing. ISBN 978-0-567-68872-9.
- Faust, Avraham (2015). "The Emergence of Iron Age Israel: On Origins and Habitus". In Thomas E. Levy; Thomas Schneider; William H. C. Propp (eds.). Israel's Exodus in Transdisciplinary Perspective: Text, Archaeology, Culture, and Geoscience. Springer. ISBN 978-3-319-04768-3.
- Willems, Harco (2010). "The First Intermediate Period and the Middle Kingdom". In Lloyd, Alan B. (ed.). A Companion to Ancient Egypt. Vol. 1. John Wiley & Sons. ISBN 9781444320060.
