= Sacred Harmonic Society =

The Sacred Harmonic Society (1832-1888) was an amateur musical organization of London. It was organized for the weekly practice of sacred music and the performance of oratorios and other sacred music.

== Performances ==
It was noted for its performances of Handel's work at the Handel festivals held at The Crystal Palace of London beginning in 1857. As many as 3,000 singers were frequently assembled with an orchestra of 500 pieces. It performed the London premier of Mendelssohn's Elijah in 1847.

== Locations ==
Its initial home was Gate Chapel in Lincoln's Inn Fields. In 1836 it moved to Exeter Hall. In 1882, the Society lost the use of Exeter Hall and disbanded.

== Conductors ==
When the Society was founded, George Perry was chosen leader of the band. At the Society's first concert, on January 15, 1833, the program contained a selection from his oratorios The Fall of Jerusalem and The Death of Abel. Perry assiduously supported the Society during the 16 years he was connected with it. In 1848 Surman, the conductor, was removed from his post, and Perry performed the duties until the close of the season, when he severed his connection with the society on the election of Michael Costa to the conductorship. Costa held the conductorship until the Society was disbanded.

== See also ==
- Robert Kanzow Bowley
