= The Seventh Plague of Egypt =

Painting by John Martin

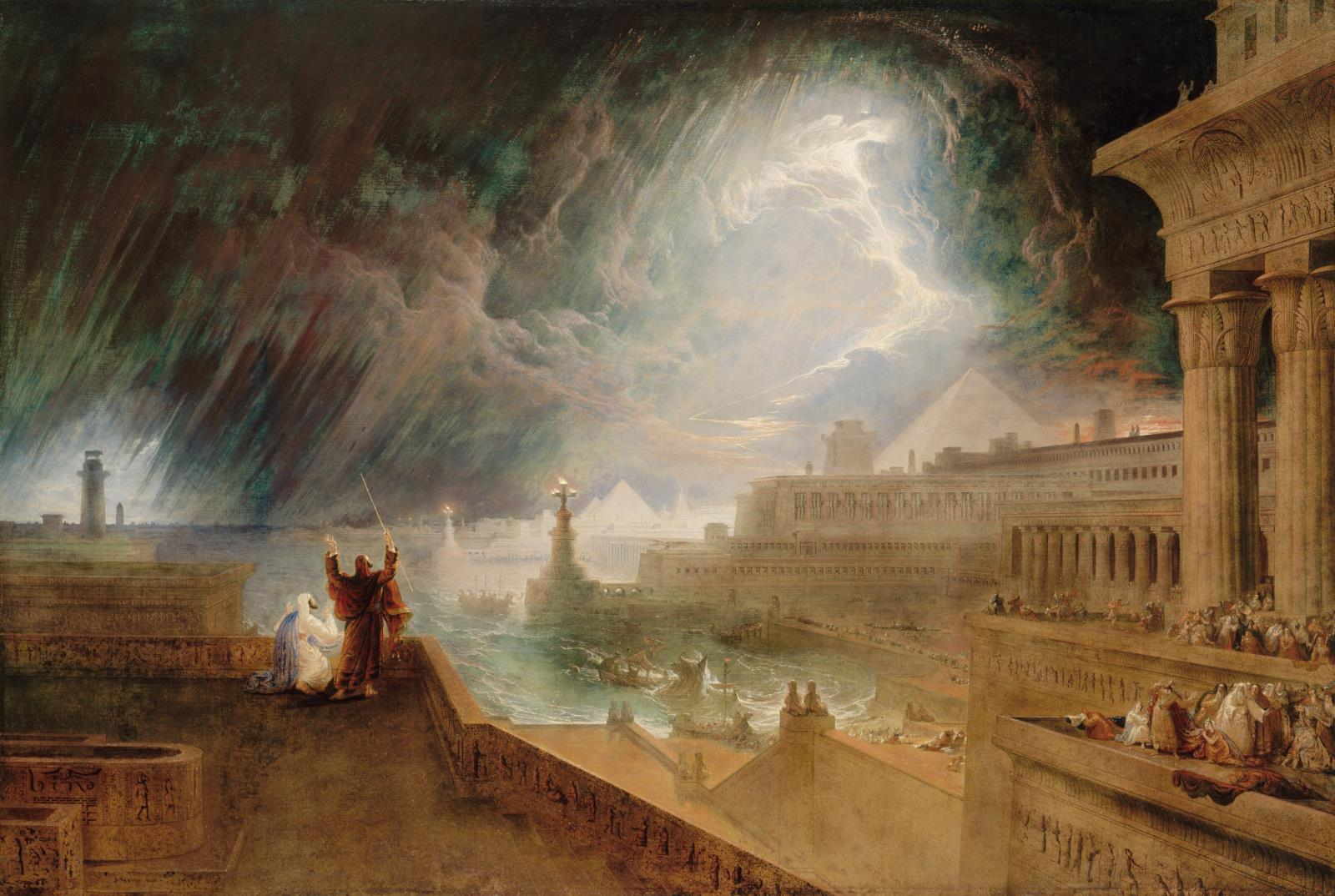
- Artist: John Martin
- Year: 1823
- Type: Oil on canvas
- Dimensions: 144.1 cm × 214 cm (56.7 in × 84 in)
- Location: Museum of Fine Arts, Boston

The Seventh Plague of Egypt is an 1823 oil painting by the British artist John Martin. It depicts the seventh of the biblical plagues of Ancient Egypt. Moses can be seen with his staff in his hands, calling down the violent storm of thunder and hail onto the Egyptians holding the Israelites in slavery. Martin painted a series of epic biblical paintings. For this painting he drew on recent archaeological discoveries of Egyptian buildings.

It appeared at the inaugural exhibition of the Royal Society of British Artists in 1824. It was bought the following year by the Whig politician John Lambton, the future Earl of Durham. It is today in the collection of the Museum of Fine Arts in Boston having been acquired in 1960.

== See also ==
- The Fifth Plague of Egypt, an 1800 painting by J. M. W. Turner which despite its title also depicts the seventh plague

== Bibliography ==
- Burritt, Amanda M. Visualising Britain’s Holy Land in the Nineteenth Century: Springer International, 2020.
- Dobson, Eleanor. Victorian Alchemy: Science, magic and ancient Egypt. UCL Press, 2022.
- Husch, Gail E. Something Coming: Apocalyptic Expectation and Mid-nineteenth-century American Painting. UPNE, 2000.
