= Michael Costa (conductor) =

Italian-born conductor and composer

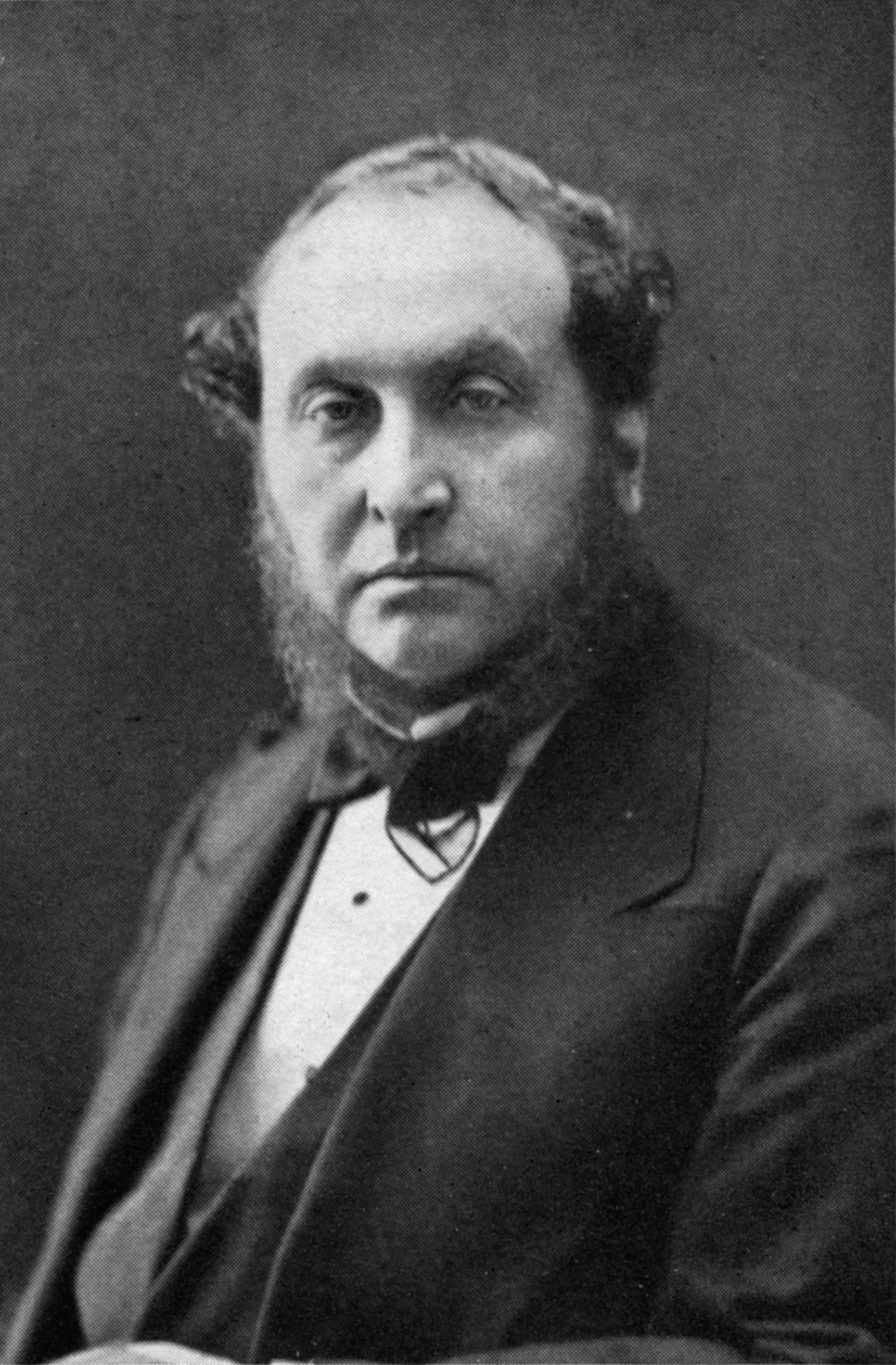
Michael Costa, circa 1850–1860

Sir Michael Andrew Angus Costa (14 February 1808 – 29 April 1884) was an Italian-born conductor and composer who achieved success in England.

== Biography ==
He was born as Michele Andrea Agniello Costa in Naples, into a family of Sephardic Jewish descent. He studied there with his father, at the Real Collegio di Musica, and later with Niccolò Antonio Zingarelli.

In his youth, as throughout his life, he wrote a great quantity of music, including operas, symphonies and cantatas, all of which have long since passed into oblivion. In 1829, he visited the Birmingham Music Festival to conduct Zingarelli's Cantata Sacra, a setting of some verses from Isaiah ch. xii. This was the occasion of his memorably inauspicious début. The intention was that Costa should rehearse and conduct the work, but J. B. Cramer and Thomas Greatorex elbowed him out and was instead engaged as a tenor soloist in another concert. Unfortunately, both the work and Costa's singing met with ferocious criticism: "[This cantata] is one of the most tame, insipid things we were ever doomed to hear: a heap of commonplace trash from the first to the last note. After twaddling in B flat for half an hour, he ventures for a few bars into F, then returns to B, and there is an end." "As a singer [Costa] is far below mediocrity, and he does not compensate for his vocal deficiencies by his personal address, which is abundantly awkward. In the theatre while singing the air "Nel furor delle tempeste", [from Bellini's Il pirata] and accompanying himself, he had a narrow escape. The tempests proved contagious, and were beginning to manifest themselves in the galleries, and had he remained but a few moments longer on the stage, he would have witnessed a storm compared to which the roarings of his own Vesuvius would have seemed but a murmur." Nonetheless, he decided to settle in England.

In 1830, he arrived in London, working at His Majesty's Theatre. Costa exerted real influence for change as a conductor at Her Majesty's and, later, at Covent Garden theatre, to which he seceded in 1847 after disagreements with the manager of Her Majesty's, Benjamin Lumley. His concern for discipline, accuracy, and ensemble was a novelty in its time and earned him the admiration both of Meyerbeer and Verdi. Despite this, he could not be claimed as a purist: his re-scoring of Handel's Messiah includes a part for cymbals.

Costa became a naturalized Englishman and received a knighthood in 1869. He was conductor of the Philharmonic Society from 1846 to 1854, of the Sacred Harmonic Society from 1848, and of the Birmingham Triennial Music Festival from 1849 to 1882. He conducted at the Bradford (1853, 1856, and 1859) and Handel festivals (1857–1880), and the Leeds Festivals from 1874 to 1880. He also taught several musicians in England, including contralto Emma Albertazzi.

He died in 1884 in Hove and was buried at Kensal Green. His home at 59 Eccleston Square in Pimlico, London, is commemorated with a blue plaque.

== Works ==
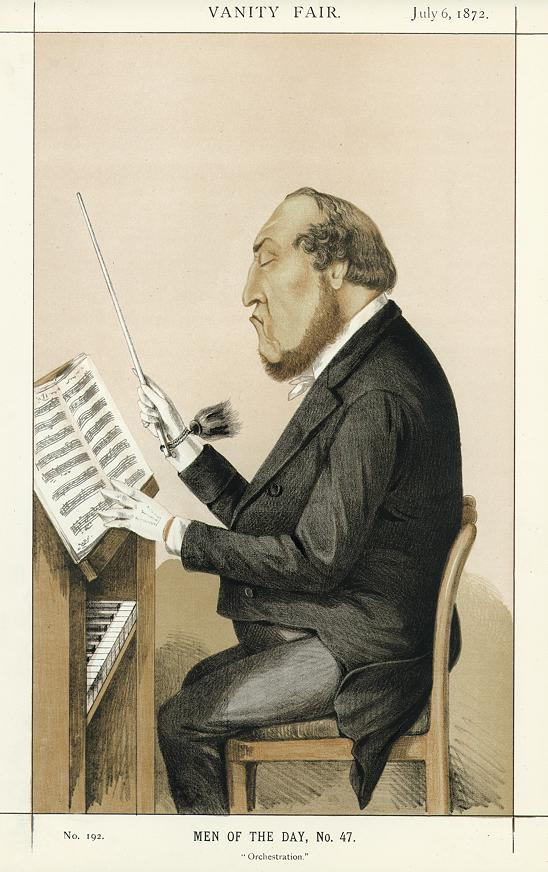
Costa by lyall in Vanity Fair, 1872

Amongst the works of Costa's maturity may be listed his ballets Kenilworth (1831), Une Heure à Naples (1832), Sir Huon (composed for Taglioni) in 1833 and the ballet Alma (1844, later revived as La fille du marbre). His opera Malek Adel was produced in Paris in 1837 and in London in 1844, as was his opera Don Carlos.

In 1855, Costa wrote the oratorio Eli, and in 1864 Naaman, both for Birmingham. Rossini's comment on the former was: "The good Costa has sent me an oratorio score and a Stilton cheese. The cheese was very good." An aria from Eli, "I will extol thee", was recorded in 1910 by the great British dramatic soprano Agnes Nicholls (1876–1959), and the quality of Costa's music can be judged on various CD re-masterings of this particular disc which have been issued in recent years.

== Freemasonry ==
On 3 May 1848, Costa followed in his brother Raphael's footsteps by becoming an English Freemason in the Bank of England Lodge, No. 263, (London, England). In July 1849, the brothers (in both senses of the word) were Exhalted (Initiated) into the Royal Arch (another branch of Freemasonry) in Fidelity Chapter, No. 3. Costa was appointed Grand Organist of the United Grand Lodge of England in 185,1 a post he occupied for two years.

The brothers were instrumental in establishing Mark Masonry in England by signing a petition sent to the Bon Accord Royal Arch Chapter (Aberdeen, Scotland) requesting that a Bon Accord Mark Lodge be established in London. The inaugural meeting of this Mark Lodge was held in the Radley Hotel, Bridge Street, Blackfriars, on 19 September 1851. At that meeting, both were 'Advanced' (Initiated) to the 'honourable degree of Mark Master.' Mark Masonry in England and Wales later came under the jurisdiction of the Grand Lodge of Mark Master Masons, but neither brother appears to have been involved in the creation of that body.
