= Wednesday Concerts =

The Wednesday Concerts were a series of concerts held at Exeter Hall in London, established in 1848 and discontinued in 1850.

The purpose was to give a miscellaneous musical entertainment at a cheap price of admission, similar to that paid at the Popular Concerts. The first series, consisting of fifteen concerts, began on 22 November 1848, and were continued once a week until 28 February 1849. The second and third series were continued until 27 June, twenty-seven having been given altogether. There was a small orchestra under John Willy as leader, and the programmes consisted of light overtures, operatic selections, vocal and orchestral, ballads, and light instrumental pieces. Occasionally more important works were tried, such as Mendelssohn's Antigone, Rossini's Stabat Mater, or Mendelssohn's Piano Concerto No. 1.

A fourth series of fifteen concerts was given, extending from 24 October 1849 to 30 January 1850, and a fifth was attempted, but only twelve of the fifteen were given. The third and fourth series showed some slight improvement in the programmes; the orchestra was increased to forty, Karl Anschütz was conductor, and symphonies of Mozart and Haydn were occasionally given in their entirety. In spite of the fine artists engaged, these concerts failed to hit the popular taste.

Among the artists who appeared were the vocalists Charlotte Birch, Charlotte Dolby, Elizabeth Poole, M. and A. Williams, Elena D'Angri, Jetty Treffz, Elizabeth Rainforth, Mr and Mrs Sims Reeves, John Braham, Giorgio Ronconi, Johann Baptist Pischek and Karl Formes; instrumentalists Kate Loder, Sigismond Thalberg, Prosper Sainton, Heinrich Wilhelm Ernst, Eugène Léon Vivier, Antoine Joseph Lavigne, and Distin and sons; and for the recitation of Antigone, John Vandenhoff, Charlotte Vandenhoff and George Bennett.
