= Karl Formes =

German opera singer

Karl Formes (1815–1889)

Karl Johann Franz Formes (b. Mülheim am Rhein, 7 August 1815; d. San Francisco, 15 December 1889), also called Charles John Formes, was a German bass opera and oratorio singer who had a long international career especially in Germany, London and New York. At one time extremely famous and in the forefront of his profession, several roles were composed for his voice, most notably that of Plunkett in Flotow's opera Martha.

Formes's own Memoirs, first published in 1888, may not be entirely trustworthy. Charles Santley recorded that Formes was a great teller of stories, 'much after the style of Baron Munchausen'.

== Origins, training and début ==
Karl Formes derived from the Spanish family of Formes-de-Varaz, settled in Germany since the 16th century. His father was sacristan of the Roman Catholic church at Mülheim, and Karl was eldest of seven sons and one daughter. He began by singing in the church choir, received keyboard (spinet) lessons and became adept at the organ and the guitar. For three years he served as church organist before, aged 14, he made a journey as far as Switzerland to earn money by itinerant singing. Although financially successful, his father would not permit him to make a career in music: instead he was apprenticed to a brewer in Cologne, a relative of his mother's, and there he remained until he was twenty. He got training in fencing and pistol shooting. There followed two years' military service in the 25 Regiment, then stationed at Coblenz. Here he first met Karl Anschütz, a musician whose career became linked to his own. After Coblenz he returned to the brewery at Cologne. In 1838 he went back to Mülheim to support his father and worked both as brewer and sacristan, while also singing when the chance arose and serving as choirmaster. At about this time he married and had children.

Around 1840, he decided to attempt a musical career, encouraged by Franz Liszt who heard him sing. An actor, Ferdinand Gumbert, tutored him in bass roles from Die Zauberflöte (Sarastro), Norma (Oroveso) and Boieldieu's La dame blanche (Gaston). He made his debut as Sarastro at Cologne Stadt-Theater in January 1842, with such success that the Director, Spielberger, immediately engaged him on a salary, and he was able to understudy other roles. Liszt declared his prophecy fulfilled, and Formes devoted himself fully to the stage. At Cologne the bass Josef Staudigl (of the Vienna Hofoper) made guest appearances which Formes studied closely, especially his Bertram in Robert le diable and his Marcel in Les Huguenots. Staudigl, returning from London in 1843, heard Formes perform Bertram with his own modifications, and paid him a broad compliment. They sang together once in I puritani, as Riccardo (Staudigl) and Giorgio (Formes). After two years (including a season at Düsseldorf), Formes broke his contract with Spielberger and escaped to Mannheim, where he joined the Grand-Ducal Opera and befriended Vinzenz Lachner. In February 1845 he was singing Marcel there.

== Vienna 1845–1848 ==
When Staudigl left the Vienna State Opera at the end of 1844, Formes was offered trial performances at Vienna. Having sung under Lachner on his way through Munich, his first Vienna performance was as Bertram under Heinrich Proch, beside Joseph Erl (Roberto), Louise Liebhart (Alice), Hasselbarth (Princess) and Reichart (Rambaldo). He was appointed to succeed Staudigl immediately, and soon performed Sarastro, Marcel, and Mozart's Figaro.

In the midst of success, he was visited by Giovanni Basadonna who offered to instruct Formes in the 'true old Italian method'. Formes studied seriously with him for three years, improving the evenness of colour in his voice, learnt musical theory with Simon Sechter, and met elderly musicians who had known Mozart or Beethoven. His interest in Schubert Lieder was developed, singing privately with Liszt on one occasion: he often sang 'Der Wanderer'.

In Vienna he sang Malvolio in Flotow's Alessandro Stradella, with Joseph Erl and Anna Zerr, and the composer wrote the role of Plunkett in Martha for him, which he created at the Theater am Kärntnertor in 1847 with Erl and Zerr, and with Therese Schwarz as Nancy. Also Halévy adapted his Les mousquetaires de la reine for Formes, Erl and Zerr. Otto Nicolai composed the role of Falstaff in his Die lustigen Weiber von Windsor for Formes, though he did not sing it until 1853 in Hamburg. Before the Hungarian Revolution of 1848 he made a tour to Brno, Pesth and Ofen. At Pesth he met the young Johann Nepomuk Beck, whom he coached as Riccardo in I puritani and performed it with him, before Beck made his distinguished baritone career in Vienna. In Ofen, in the Arena, he sang Bertram, and also his Caspar in Der Freischütz to Joseph Erl's Max.

Formes obtained performances at Vienna of Nicolai's Die Heimkehr des Verbannten and Il templario, both suppressed there as works of Prussian sympathy. An engagement from 1846–1850 to sing at Milan was broken off after a few days for fear of anti-Austrian feeling, though he was in fact German. Giacomo Meyerbeer invited him to sing Marcel and Bertram in Berlin, but the plan misfired and he did not appear there until 1853. Imprisoned briefly in Vienna for speaking disrespectfully of Metternich, he still took part in rehearsals and performances. Formes, hostile to Metternich's oppressions, fell heavily out of official favour in revolutionary Vienna. When he was driven to leave early in 1848, Joseph Staudigl resumed his post at the State Opera.

== Germany and Netherlands, 1848–49 ==
Escaping to Hamburg (where he had missed fulfilling a contract in April 1848) he joined the Opera's co-operative, paid on shares not guarantee, singing first his Marcel. That autumn 1848 he took some part in the opening of the revolt of Schleswig against Denmark. After singing in Bremen, Leipzig and Frankfurt he reached Dresden, where for a term he sang with Josef Tichatschek (whom he admired immensely) and Johanna Wagner, sometimes under Richard Wagner's baton, though not himself a Wagnerian. Formes advocated to Wagner the Italianate delivery of his recitatives in preference to harsher declamation. In addition to Bertram and Marcel, Sarastro, Figaro and Caspar, he sang Lysiart (Euryanthe), the Cardinal (La Juive), Osmin (Die Entführung aus dem Serail), Rocco (Fidelio) and Mephisto in Spohr's opera of Faust. He was also singing Leporello at that time.

After a season in Braunschweig he returned to Dresden. He attempted to revisit in Vienna and only narrowly escaped. Then after singing in Cologne for a spell, he received engagements in Amsterdam through Ferdinand Röder, where (for his old friend Karl Anschütz) he appeared in Der Freischütz, Weber's Jessonda, Spohr's Faust and Die Zauberflöte in Italian versions for the first time. He also sang with success in Rotterdam, Leyden, Utrecht, and other parts of the Netherlands, all the time suffering from an intermittent fever.

== London, 1849–1850 ==
In May 1849, he joined Röder's German company under Anschütz for a season in London. Anschütz conducted the Drury Lane orchestra for Röder's season and improved its playing standard, which had often been erratic when led by its regular conductor, the Maltese-born Francesco Schira (1809-1883). The fever gone, in June Formes first sang his Sarastro at Drury Lane Theatre, London to great acclamation: Charles Santley was inspired by this example.

H.F. Chorley wrote that Formes

created a real sensation by his singing in 'Die Zauberflöte'. Never was man endowed with a more majestic voice and presence to work with in his art than he. I can call to mind no other deep bass voice, so deep, so sonorous, so equal as his, in 1849, – nor did I ever see anyone move with more dignity than did he, then, as High Priest. From the first, he possessed himself of the sympathies of the English.

Engaged by the Sacred Harmonic Society to sing Elijah, Messiah and The Creation at Exeter Hall, soon Formes became as admired in concert as on the theatre stage. In the 1849 Wednesday Concerts under Anschütz at Exeter Hall he appeared alongside such musicians as Alfredo Piatti, Henri Vieuxtemps, Ole Bull, Giorgio Ronconi and Marietta Alboni. He sang in the solo quartet of Beethoven's 9th Symphony with Clara Novello, Charlotte Sainton-Dolby and Sims Reeves, under Anschütz, with orchestra of 350 and chorus of 700, (afterwards repeated with Reichart, former Vienna colleague, in Reeves's place) and in the same formation sang Mozart's Requiem at the Wednesday Concerts.

Formes was soon recruited as primo basso assoluto for the standing management for reconstruction of the Royal Italian Opera at Covent Garden Theatre after its latest collapse. This group included Michael Costa, Mario, Giulia Grisi, Mme Castellan, Giorgio Ronconi and Enrico Tamberlik (all migrants from Benjamin Lumley's company in 1846), Antonio Tamburini, Elena D'Angri and Frederick Gye. In April 1850 Formes appeared as Caspar in the first Italian Der Freischütz in London (Il franco arciero) with Tamberlik, which Chorley thought 'one of his favourite characters – the type of all he could do best in opera'.

There followed the first London Italian performances of Gli Ugonotti, with Mario, Grisi, D'Angri, Tamburini and Marai to Formes's Marcel, and Roberto il diavolo, with Tamberlik, Pauline Viardot, Grisi and Mario to his Bertram. Chorley remarked:

the greatest mistake was the Bertram of Herr Formes... – a Bertram who floundered about, like an ill-advised bat, so as to hamper every creature concerned with him by his acting, without in the slightest degree redeeming the overweening predominance by any musical correctness or beauty. It was a hard and real disappointment.

Chorley saw him play Caspar with the Belgian tenor Maralti and Mme Castellan, and his Leporello with Grisi, Viardot and Mario. There followed his Sarastro, with Louisa Pyne, Angiolina Bosio and Mario. Formes had a successful debut and season in Spain, and claimed to have visited and sung for both Heinrich Heine and Rossini in Paris on his way there. In autumn 1850 he sang Elijah at the Hall inauguration for Liverpool's first Grand Musical Festival, and the next night joined Tamburini, Luigi Lablache and Ronconi in bass passages of Mozart's Requiem and Rossini's Stabat Mater. The same year (and in later years) he joined the Italian Company's operatic tour in Dublin under Anschütz, and made a recital tour in Scotland with Clara Novello and Sims Reeves, the violinist Ernst and pianist Litolff.

== London and elsewhere, 1850–1857 ==
In 1855, Formes and Anschütz holidayed with Reményi in Jersey. His second Covent Garden season included Fidelio (Rocco), with Jenny Bürde-Ney (1826–1886) and Tamberlik, and in the third (1852) was Weber's Jessonda and Formes's Mephisto in Spohr's Faust, with Ronconi, Bosio and Tamberlik. Rossini's Guglielmo Tell was also given, and Tamberlik and Formes appeared as Peter the Great and General Romanoff in two sumptuous performances of Jullien's opera Pietro il Grande, which was a complete failure and ruined the composer. In 1851 Karl Formes's brother, Theodor Formes (1826–1875), became a principal tenor at the Hofoper Berlin, where he sang the title roles in the first local performances of Tannhäuser (1856) and Lohengrin (1859). Theodor sang at Berlin until 1864. The brothers Hubert and Wilhelm were also operatic singers.

Karl Formes sang every year from 1850–1857 in London, and from October 1851 to Lent 1852 and in two subsequent winters he sang at St Petersburg. His first performance there was with Mario, Grisi, Tamburini and others, and he sang Les Huguenots, Le nozze di Figaro, etc. In 1852 he was in the premiere of a new 3-act revision of Spohr's Faust. With Reeves, Viardot, Pyne and Sainton-Dolby, he gave first performances of new English oratorios at the Norwich Festival, and in September made his debut at the Birmingham Festival. In 1853 he took part in the London first performance of Berlioz' Benvenuto Cellini in the role of Cardinal. In Berlin he now first sang Sarastro, Marcel and Bertram, before returning to London. He performed a Fidelio (Rocco) at Liverpool under Edward Loder, and made his first operatic tour (of many) in Scotland with Anetta Caradori, Mme Rudersdorff, Minna Von Berkel and Elena D'Angri, tenors Pavesi and Reichart, baritones Fortini and Mancusi and bassisti Charles Zelger and himself.

Formes sang in the first Grand Concert in the Crystal Palace in 1853, and performed Handel's Messiah in the first Crystal Palace Music Festival later that year. He took part in a concert at Exeter Hall to benefit Hungarians exiled after the Revolution. Anna Zerr was in London but could not participate from expectation of reprisals in Vienna, for spies were ready to denounce them. In autumn Formes sang at Hamburg the Falstaff written for him by Nicolai. In 1854 he sang under Liszt's baton at Weimar, and was appointed an English Royal Chamber-singer by H.M. Queen Victoria. On 29 August 1855 Michael Costa conducted the premiere of his oratorio Eli at the Birmingham Festival, with Viardot, Castellan, Reeves and Formes. That year Formes sang Pierre le Grand in L'étoile du nord with Mmes Bosio and Marai, a role he claimed Meyerbeer intended for him, though Chorley compared him unfavourably with the original Pierre of Bataille. In 1856 he assisted in bringing the tenor Theodor Wachtel to London.

== First American tours, 1857–1863 ==
In 1857, Bernard Ullman invited Karl Anschütz to lead an operatic company on American tour, including soprano Anna de la Grange, bass-baritone Edouard Gassier and his soprano wife, Elena d'Angri (contralto) and conductor Abella d'Angri, tenors Mario Tiberini and Luigi Stefani, and bassisti Augustini Susini and Karl Formes. For his New York debut, 30 Nov 1857, Formes sang Bertram in Roberto il diavolo at the Academy of Music (Italian U.S. première), and over the next 7 weeks appeared in Martha, I puritani, Fidelio, Il barbiere di Siviglia (Don Basilio) and Don Giovanni (Leporello). There were grand performances of The Creation and Messiah, and (in concert with Thalberg and Vieuxtemps) of Mozart's Requiem. Formes was an instant sensation. After Elijah in Boston, by 27 January 1858 the troupe was off to Philadelphia Academy, where Formes sang Plunkett (with Hugo Pickaneser), I puritani, Leporello, Bertram, and Elmiro in Otello with conductors Anschütz, D'Angri and Carl Bergmann. By late February Formes was back in New York for I puritani and Otello, and (8 March) his Marcel in Gli Ugonotti (Italian U.S. première). After Bignardi's farewell on 23 March, and a short season in San Francisco, he sang Mozart's Requiem and Elijah at New York in late April.

Anschütz and Formes made a recital tour in the west before the start of the second opera season, in October 1858. Ullman's company included soprano Rosine d'Hur Laborde, pianist Gustave Satter. His new star, soprano Marie Piccolomini brought conductor Emanuele Muzio to share direction. She sang La figlia del reggimento with Formes (Sulpizio) and Giuseppe Tamaro at New York Academy from October 27, 1858. (The 'astonishing little flirt Piccolomini' was contrasted with the 'massive loyalty of the ponderous Formes'.) Formes sang his Leporello, Bertram and Marcel: he and Piccolomini shared honours in Le nozze di Figaro ('Non più andrai' encored in German) and weaknesses in Lucrezia Borgia, but were at odds as Adam and Eve in The Creation on 11 January 1859 in a ludicrous showdown over 'God save the Queen'. Formes and Piccolomini had a four-week tour in Boston in December and went to Philadelphia in January with La figlia under Muzio, and Le Nozze (with Angiolina Ghioni, von Berkel and Emanuele Florenza, under Anschütz) and Don Giovanni (with Euphrosine Poinsot, Ghioni, Florenza, Domenico Lorini and Domenico Coletti). Formes gave Les Huguenots and Roberto il diabolo with Poinsot and Laborde. Anschütz and Formes then led the company's touring progress en route to New Orleans (arrived 23 February), while Piccolomini left to make her farewell. Returning, in May Philadelphia heard Formes's Martha (with Laborde, Adelaide Phillips and Giovanni Sbriglia), and his roles in Norma, Roberto, Lucia di Lammermoor and Don Giovanni in casts featuring Laborde and Stefani: then to Boston again until 11 June.

Formes returned to England for the principal seasons of 1860, 1861 and 1862, making visits to the States and in Germany. In 1860 the impresario Maurice Strakosch (Adelina Patti's brother-in-law) was in partnership with Ullman, and Anschutz, settled in America, was directing the troupe and leading the Arion Männergesangverein, a Teutonized men's singing-circle. Formes (who befriended Strakosch), after a spell in London and Europe returned to America. He sang Act 2 of Martha in concert with Bertha Johanssen, von Berkel and Giorgio Stigelli, and with Stigelli gave the duet scene from Masaniello under Theodore Thomas. On October 10, 1860 he sang in the Philadelphia Gala Performance for Albert Edward, Prince of Wales of Martha with the young Patti, Fanny Heron Natali, Pasquale Brignoli and Nicolò Basili: Patti and Formes led 'God save the Queen.' The Ullman-Strakosch partnership failed, and split into a Franco-Italian faction under Muzio and a German company under Formes and soprano Inez Fabbri, with Stigelli, von Berkel, Anschütz and manager Richard Mulder. Having won control of the New York Academy, on October 24, 1860 the Formes-Fabbri company gave Roberto il diavolo, and a week later sang Der Freischütz: but after only four opera nights the project folded. Formes gave a Grand Farewell on 1 January 1861 in Martha and Act 2 of Flotow's Stradella under Theodore Thomas, with Johannsen, Mme Eckardt and Stigelli, and then reappeared for Stigelli's Farewell on January 11 singing Stradella in full and Act 4 of La Juive. Formes made a great impression with the "Star-Spangled Banner", 'with a flag of the Union in one hand, and with a voice and air that thrilled with lofty patriotism, and found an echo in every heart present...' Formes and Carlotta Patti sang in Stigelli's Boston Farewell on 28 January.

== Later career ==
In 1863, in London, Formes became bankrupt. He had transferred power of attorney in his residence and property in Wiesbaden to his wife, and when trying to buy a house in Chicago he found she had taken everything. His voice becoming worn, and needing employment, he essayed a career as stage actor: after some study he played Schiller's William Tell and Lessing's Nathan the Wise, in Würzburg and Mainz with success, and Shylock (The Merchant of Venice) with artistic (but not financial) success in England. Santley saw him as Shylock, and observed that (although Formes always preserved a strong German accent in conversation) his English declamation and rhythm were exemplary, better than the English actors:

he pronounced the letters, divided the syllables, and accented the accented syllables, so that, though now and then his pronunciation of a word was not quite English, his enunciation was perfectly distinct."

His second wife, from Wiesbaden, also failed to safeguard his money. However Formes returned to singing, and to America. Anschütz established German Opera at New York in 1862, and in October 1864 Formes was with Leonard Grover's German Opera Company in Boston, with Johannsen and Marie Frederici (mezzo), Johanna Rotter, Theodore Habelman (tenor), Josef Hermanns (basso) and Sig. Tamaro. These singers cohered in subsequent years. Anschütz retired from the German Opera in 1864, and in spring 1865 his pupil and chorus-master Adolf Neuendorff delivered William Tell at the New York Academy with Frederici, Habelman, Hermanns, Carl Formes and Wilhelm Formes (his brother), as Grover's Company. The Grover company gave Martha (April 29) with Formes, Franz Himmer, Rotter and Sophie Dziuba (Nancy). Formes had developed connections with Abraham Lincoln's household, and published a Song without words for piano in his memory. In summer 1865 he sang under Anschütz at Hyde Park Hotel on Lake Michigan (near Calumet) and afterwards had a season of game-shooting. A crack shot, Formes could shoot a coin from between a prima donna's thumb and forefinger from twelve feet, and told stories of his fights with grizzlies. In the winter of 1865–66 he sang in Havana, notably in Martha and Roberto il diabolo, under Muzio: he was briefly arrested. In 1868 he visited England for a Covent Garden season (including a tour) for Mapleson, in company with Charles Santley, Zélia Trebelli and colleagues. After a very busy programme Formes went on to Cologne, but was back in the States for the winter, touring with La Grange, Brignoli, Hermanns, Rotter and others, in a company which in January 1869 was performing Roberto il diabolo, Sicilian Vespers, L'Etoile du nord, L'Africaine and Belisario, among more standard repertoire, in Boston. Formes returned to England for the 1869 Covent Garden company tour, playing the Ghost in the Hamlet of Ambroise Thomas with Santley (title) and Ilma de Murska (Ophelia) in Manchester, Liverpool and London. Santley liked him:

he played Rocco in 'Fidelio', Marcel in the 'Huguenots' in a style that no man in my time has approached, and except Giorgio Ronconi his Leporello was the finest I remember, especially the last scene. He was inferior to Ronconi in the comic scenes. I had not known him long before I discovered that, with all his terrible talk and bluster, he was as gentle as a lamb. We became very intimate friends.

When Anschütz died in America in 1870 his German Company had already failed, but under Neuendorff the troupe brought by Luise Lichtmay that winter introduced Bertha Roemer, Clara Perl and basso Adolf Franosch: Formes was with their January 1871 Boston tour in a full programme including Lustige Weiber, La dame blanche and Stradella. Lichtmay's troupe presented the U.S. premiere of Lohengrin at the Stadt Theater (Bowery), in German, but Franosch, not Formes, played Heinrich, with Lichtmay (Elsa), Habelman (title), Marie Frederici (Ortrud) and Edward Vierling (Telramund). In January 1872 Formes appeared in the U.S. premiere of Marschner's opera Der Templer und die Jüdin. About two months later he played Marcel in one performance of Gli Ugonotti at New York under Neuendorff, with Parepa-Rosa, Adelaide Phillips, Santley and Theodor Wachtel. 'His voice was too much worn to last out the whole opera, but his representation of the rough old soldier was as perfect as ever,' wrote Santley.

Formes's voice preserved its volume and sweetness, though advancing age affected his intonation. In 1874 he sang in Europe, notably in Berlin where the continuing beauty of his voice caused wonder and admiration. His brother Theodor was then dying in asylum, having become mentally ill. That winter he conducted an operatic tour in the southern states, and spent Christmas Day singing at a plantation between Charleston and Savannah.

== Retirement ==
In 1875, he was sent (with his second wife) to California to recover from a cough, and having sung with success in opera and concert there, decided to settle in San Francisco, and to establish himself as a teacher. He retired from the stage in 1878, but continued to sing regularly in concert and public events. Some notices suggest that Formes became very poor, and was reduced to singing popular songs in cafés chantants for a living. After his second wife's death, in 1882–83 he went east for a season to sing again, and married Pauline, one of his students since 1876, in Philadelphia. In 1883 made a concert tour in various parts of the U.S. and Canada with the distinguished operatic singer Emma Thursby (1845–1931), travelling with Maurice Strakosch. Having returned to San Francisco to resume teaching with Pauline, in 1887 he published his 'Old Italian Method of Singing', the fruits of a lifetime's experience. In 1888 he sang at the first large Music Festival in Quebec with his pupil Carrie McLellan. He and Pauline visited England and France in 1888, and Formes gave concerts in England and met again with Charles Santley. He published his memoirs in German at Cologne in 1888 with the help of the editor Wilhelm Koch. His final appearance was on 10 December 1889 at the opening of the Bijou Theatre in San Francisco, to sing Don Basilio once more: he was received with great enthusiasm. On December 15 he succumbed to pneumonia and heart failure. He was buried at Holy Cross Cemetery. His wife published the English translation of his Memoirs in 1892.

Formes's son, Ernst Formes (b. Mühlheim 30 Jan 1841; d. Berlin 2 April 1898), was a noted actor in Germany. He was a literary connoisseur who could read in four languages. Like his father, 'he could relate the most unbelievable Munchhausiads with the most passive face in the world.'

It seems likely that Carl Formes Jr. (b. London 3 July 1841; d. Los Angeles 18 Nov 1939), actor in about 40 silent movies c. 1914 onwards, was a relative, probably the nephew of Karl senior.

A street in Cologne-Mülheim is named the Formesstrasse after this formerly world-famous family of singers.

== Writings ==
- Wilhelm Koch (Editor), Aus meinem Kunst- und Bühnenleben. Erinnerungen des Bassisten Karl Formes (Köln 1888).
- My Memoirs. Autobiography of Karl Formes. Published in his Memory (James H. Barry (printer), San Francisco 1891)
- The Old Italian Method of Singing (San Francisco 1885).
- Three Songs Without Words (for piano) (Root and Cady, Chicago 1865)
  - 1. In Memory of Abraham Lincoln
  - 2. About Madrid 1851
  - 3. The Pruss Refugee
- In Sheltered Vale, (Old German folk song).

== Sources ==
- 'Obituary: Herr Carl Formes', The Musical Times and Singing Class Circular, Vol. 31, No. 563 (Jan. 1, 1890), pp. 25–26.
- Public domain text from Meyers Konversations-Lexikon, 4. Auflage von 1888–1890.
- Wilhelm Koch (Ed.), Aus meinem Kunst- und Bühnenleben. Erinnerungen des Bassisten Karl Formes (Cologne 1888).
- Deutscher Bühnen-Almanach. 25. Jahrg. (German Stage-Almanack, 25th Year) Ed. by Th. Entsch. (Berlin 1891), p. 310.
- Neuer Theater-Almanach Edited by the Genossenschaft Deutscher Bühnen-Angehöriger, 2nd Year. (Berlin 1891), p. 96, 97.
- Ludwig Eisenberg, Großes Biogr. Lexikon d. Deutschen Bühne im XIX. Jahrh. (Big Biographical Lexikon of the German Stage in the 19th century), (Leipzig 1903), p. 271.
- R. Lothar and Jul. Stern, 50 Jahre Hoftheater. Geschichte d. beiden Wiener Hoftheater Neue Ausgabe. (Vienna, no year) Register p.xv.
- Ferdinand Ritter von Seyfried, Rückschau in das Theaterleben Wiens seit den letzten fünfzig Jahren. (Retrospective of the Theatre Life of Vienna over the past 50 years), (Vienna 1864), pp. 314–316.
- H. Rosenthal, Two Centuries of Opera at Covent Garden (London, 1958).
- H. Uhde, Das Stadttheater in Hamburg. (Stuttgart 1879). Register.
