= Opera in English =

Music genre

The history of opera in the English language commences in the 17th century.

== Earliest examples ==
In England, one of opera's antecedents in the 16th century was an afterpiece which came at the end of a play; often scandalous and consisting in the main of dialogue set to music arranged from popular tunes. In this respect such afterpieces anticipate the ballad operas of the 18th century. At the same time, the French masque was gaining a firm hold at the English Court, with lavish splendour and highly realistic scenery. Inigo Jones became the leading designer of these productions, and this style was to dominate the English stage for three centuries. These masques contained songs and dances. In Ben Jonson's Lovers Made Men (1617), "the whole masque was sung after the Italian manner, stilo recitativo".

== Purcell and his contemporaries ==
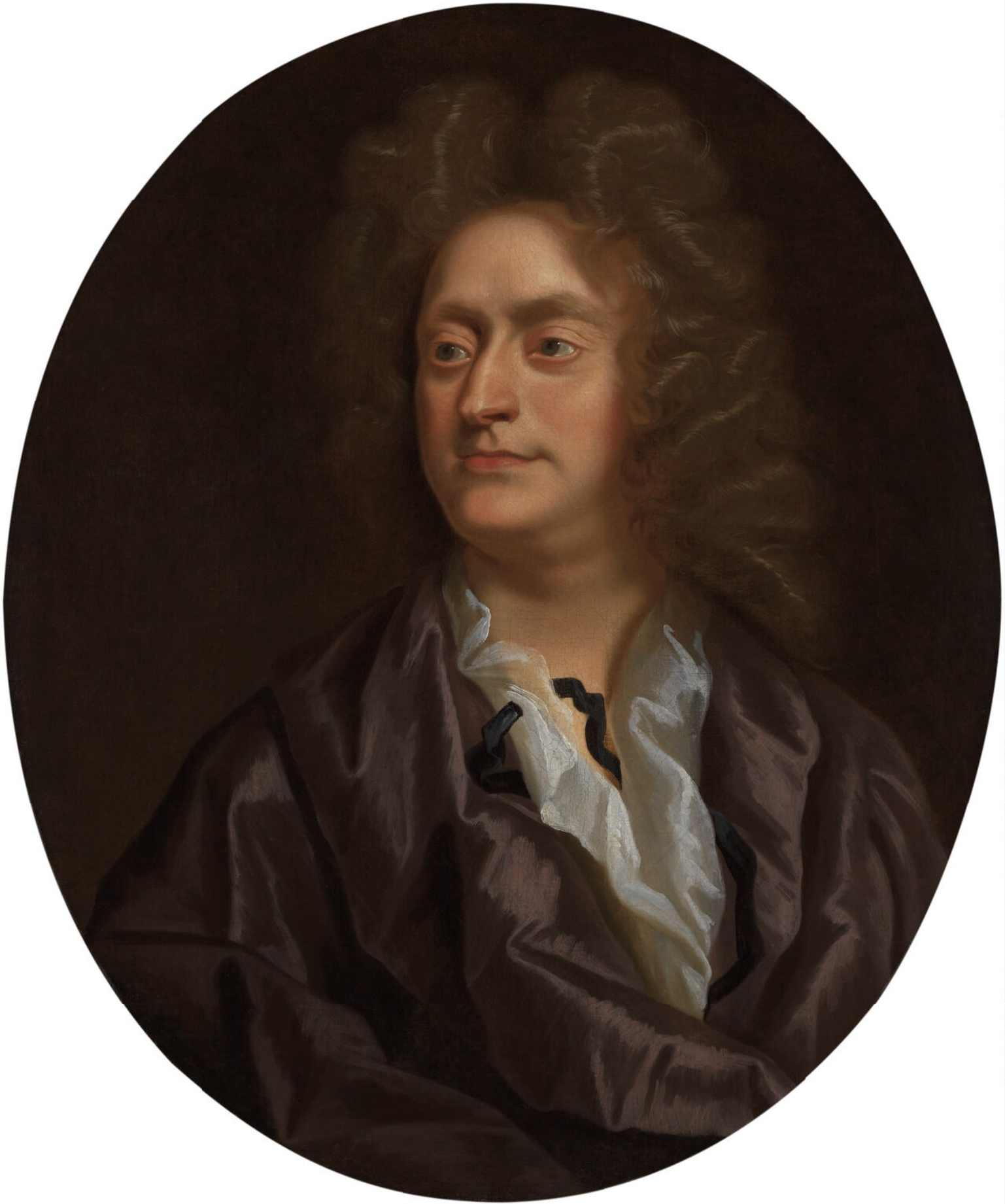
Henry Purcell

The approach of the English Commonwealth closed theatres and halted any developments that may have led to the establishment of English opera. However, in 1656, the dramatist Sir William Davenant produced The Siege of Rhodes. Since his theatre was not licensed to produce drama, he asked several of the leading composers (Henry Lawes, Cooke, Locke, Coleman and Hudson) to set sections of it to music. This success was followed by The Cruelty of the Spaniards in Peru (1658) and The History of Sir Francis Drake (1659). These pieces were encouraged by Oliver Cromwell because they were critical of Spain. With the English Restoration, foreign (especially French) musicians were welcomed back. In 1673, Thomas Shadwell's Psyche, patterned on the 1671 'comédie-ballet' of the same name produced by Molière and Jean-Baptiste Lully. William Davenant produced The Tempest in the same year, which was the first Shakespeare play to be set to music (composed by Locke and Johnson).

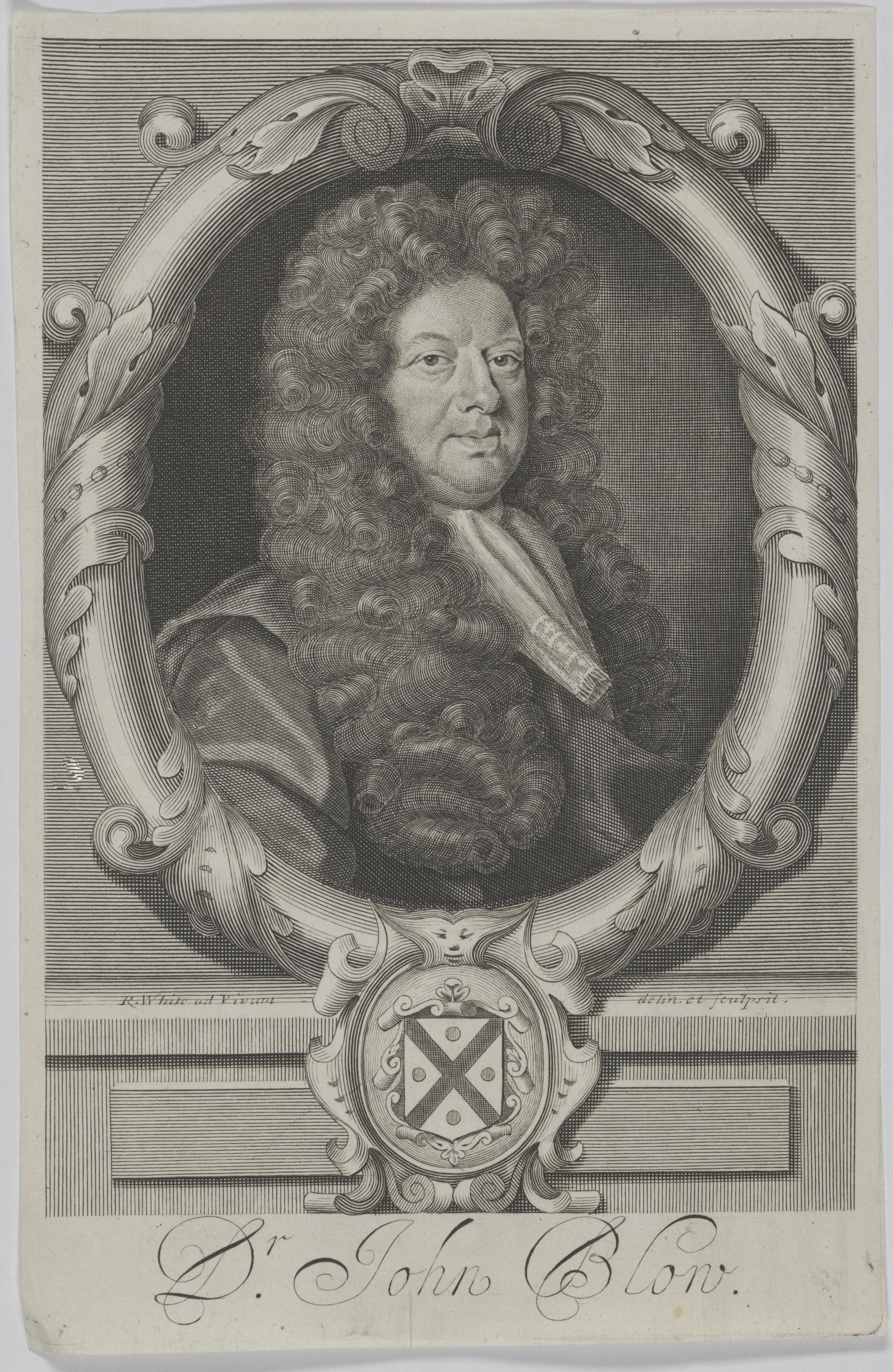
John Blow

About 1683, John Blow composed Venus and Adonis, often thought of as the first true English-language opera. Blow's immediate successor was the better known Henry Purcell. Despite the success of his masterwork Dido and Aeneas (1689), in which the action is furthered by the use of Italian-style recitative, much of Purcell's best work was not involved in the composing of typical opera, but instead he usually worked within the constraints of the semi-opera format, where isolated scenes and masques are contained within the structure of a spoken play, such as Shakespeare in Purcell's The Fairy-Queen (1692) and Beaumont and Fletcher in The Prophetess (1690) and Bonduca (1696). The main characters of the play tend not to be involved in the musical scenes, which means that Purcell was rarely able to develop his characters through song. Despite these hindrances, his aim (and that of his collaborator John Dryden) was to establish serious opera in England, but these hopes ended with Purcell's early death at the age of 36.

== 18th and 19th centuries ==
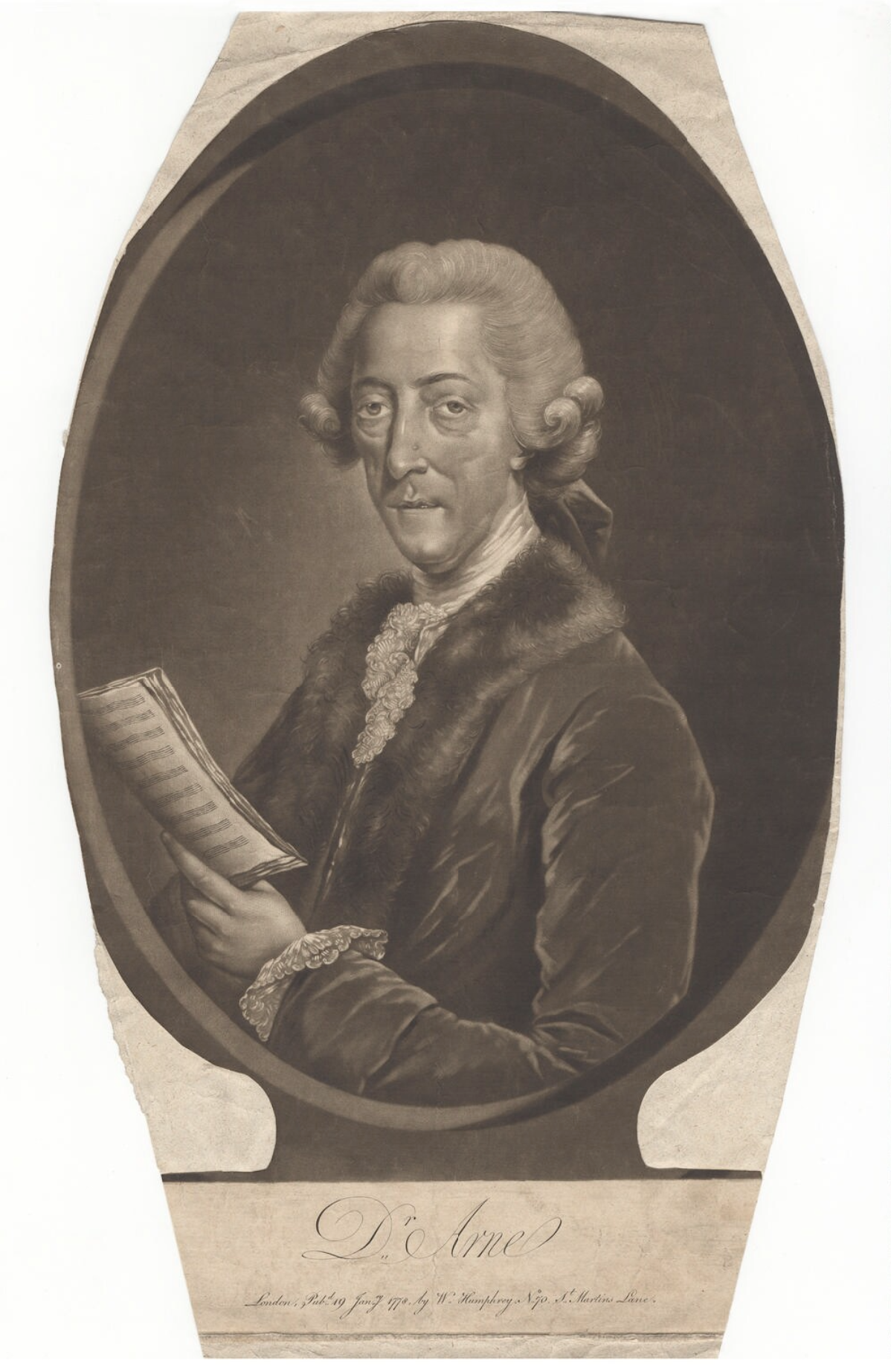
Thomas Arne

Following Purcell, the popularity of opera in England dwindled. A revived interest in opera occurred in the 1730s, which is largely attributed to Thomas Arne both for his own compositions and for alerting Handel to the commercial possibilities of large-scale works in English. Arne was the first English composer to experiment with Italian-style all-sung comic opera, unsuccessfully in The Temple of Dullness (1745), Henry and Emma (1749) and Don Saverio (1750), but triumphantly in Thomas and Sally (1760). His opera Artaxerxes (1762) was the first attempt to set a full-blown opera seria in English and was a huge success, holding the stage until the 1830s. His modernized ballad opera, Love in a Village (1762), was equally novel and began a vogue for pastiche opera that lasted well into the 19th century. Arne was one of the few English composers of the era who, although imitating many elements of Italian opera, was able to move beyond it to create his own voice. Charles Burney wrote that Arne introduced "a light, airy, original, and pleasing melody, wholly different from that of Purcell or Handel, whom all English composers had either pillaged or imitated".

Besides Arne, the other dominating forces in English opera at this time was George Frideric Handel, whose opera serias filled the London operatic stages for decades, and influenced most home-grown composers, such as John Frederick Lampe, to write using Italian models in imitation of him.

Throughout the second half of the 18th the most popular English genre proved to be ballad opera. Some notable composers include Arne's son Michael Arne, Dibdin, Linley Jr., Arnold, Hook, Shield, the tenor Michael Kelly, Stephen Storace and Mozart's favourite pupil Attwood. The most successful composer of the late Georgian era was Henry Bishop, whose song Home! Sweet Home! from the opera Clari, or the Maid of Milan is still popular today.

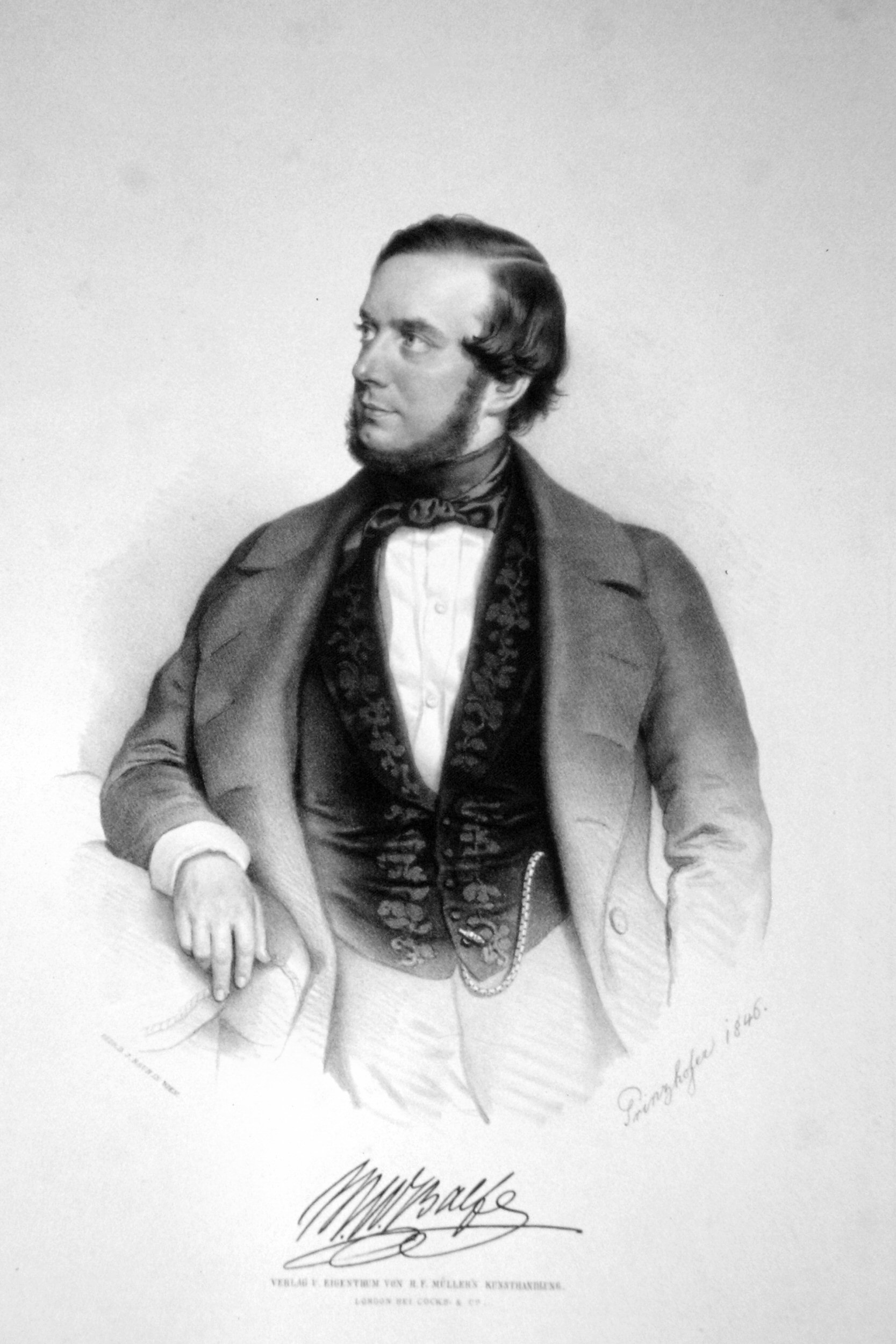
Balfe in a lithography by August Prinzhofer, 1846

While throughout the 18th century and the beginning of the 19th composers had been influenced mainly by Italian opera, later in the century Meyerbeer's grand operas and, further later, Wagner's operas came to be regarded as the major models for imitation.

The beginning of the Victorian era saw a short but particularly intense period of creativity, roughly up to the 1850s, partially thanks to the keen interest in music of the Queen and of Prince Albert. The Romantic operas of Michael Balfe (the only one whose fame spread throughout Europe), Julius Benedict, John Barnett, Edward Loder, G. A. Macfarren and William Wallace achieved great popularity both in Great Britain and Ireland.

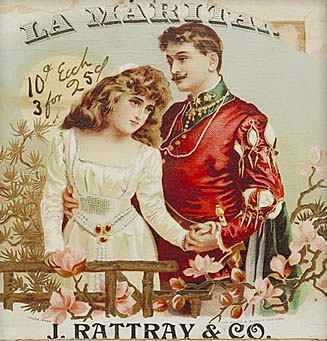
Cigar box from 1883 showing a scene from Maritana by Wallace

John Barnett made a serious attempt to follow in the footsteps of Carl Maria von Weber with his opera The Mountain Sylph (1834), often mistakenly claimed as the first sung-through (i.e. completely sung) English opera, which was his only major success (and was later parodied by Gilbert and Sullivan in Iolanthe).
Among the main lanes in London for the production of English language opera in those times were Drury Lane, the Princess's Theatre and the Lyceum. The King's Theatre and the Covent Garden, which were the two major opera houses of the city, featured mostly Italian and French opera (the latter usually translated into Italian). This was a source of continuous vexation for English composers who, until late in the century, had to see their works translated into Italian to be performed on those stages.

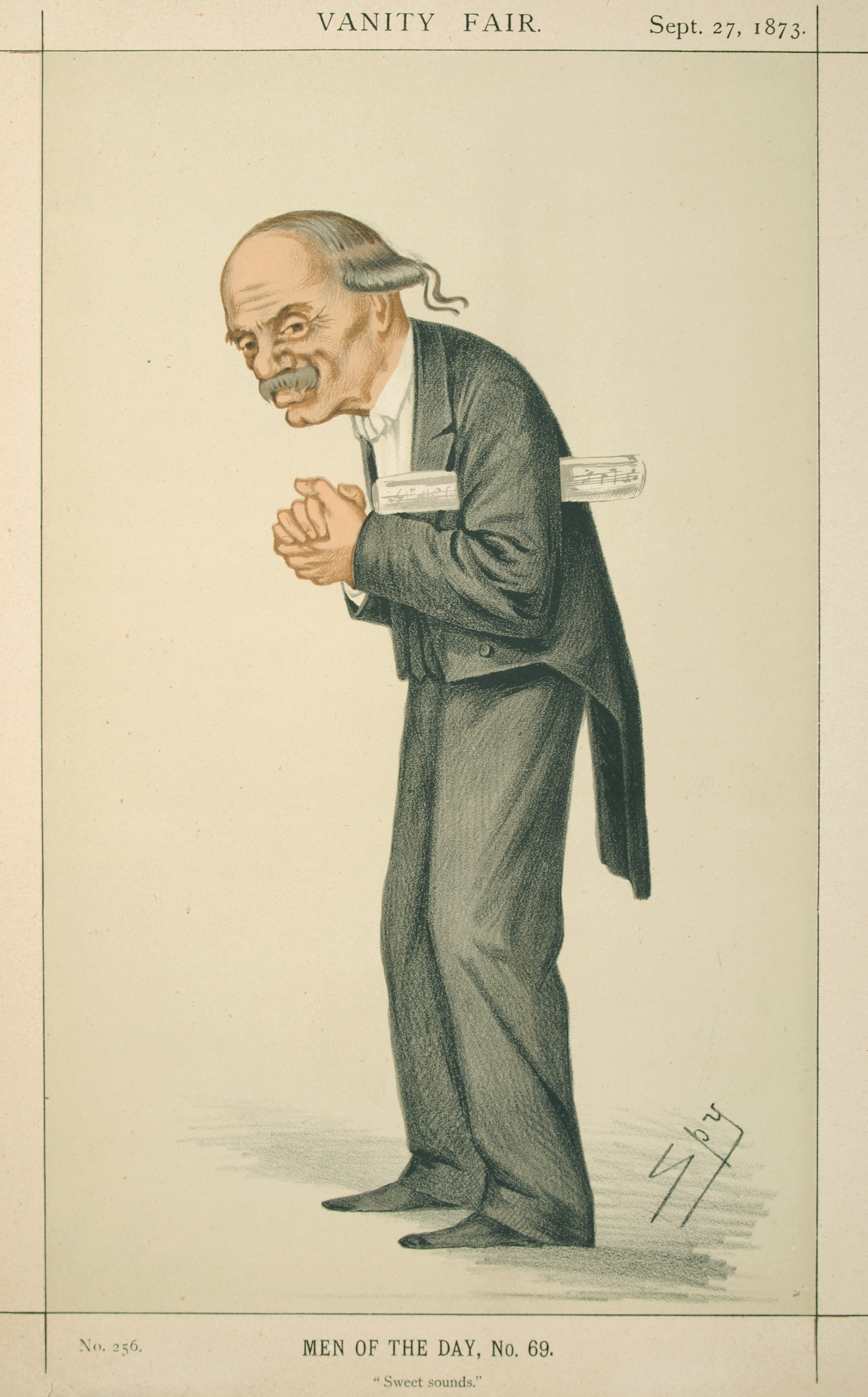
Benedict in a caricature by Leslie Ward from Vanity Fair (1873)

Moreover, the constant presence of a foreign language opera season in the city meant that the operas of indigenous composers had constantly to compete with those of the great Italian composers, as well as those of Weber, Meyerbeer, Fromental Halévy and Gounod (the last three usually performed in Italian at the Covent Garden), which continued to dominate the musical stage in England. Beside Balfe, whose operas were translated into German, French and Italian (The Bohemian Girl as La Zingara, for Trieste), the only other composers to gain so renown on the Continent and to have their operas translated into a foreign language were Benedict (into his native German) and Wallace (also in German).

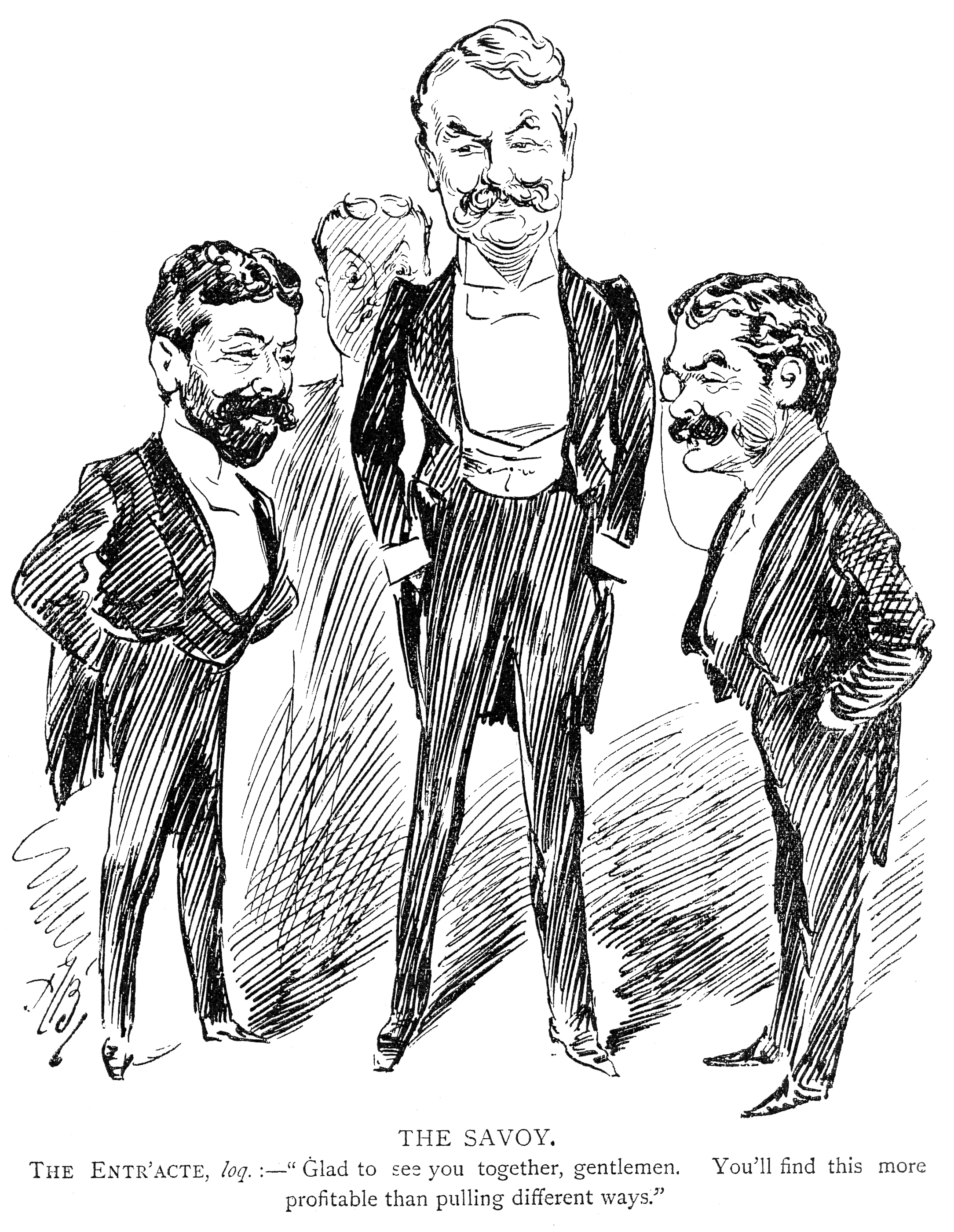
from left to right: the Savoy impresario Richard D'Oyly Carte with W. S. Gilbert, and Arthur Sullivan in a drawing by Alfred Bryan, 1894

After the 1870s, the reputation of English Romantic Opera slowly started to decline until, by the end of the century, most critics' opinion was against them. The only works to be still performed well into the 1930s were The Bohemian Girl, Maritana and The Lily of Killarney.

Beside foreign opera and European operetta, the most popular forms of indigenous entertainment in the second half of the 19th century were burlesques and late Victorian era light operas, notably the Savoy Operas of Gilbert and Sullivan, both of which frequently spoofed operatic conventions.

Sullivan wrote only one grand opera, Ivanhoe (following the efforts of a number of young English composers beginning about 1876), but he claimed that even his light operas were to be part of an "English" opera school, intended to supplant the French operettas (usually in bad translations) that had dominated the London stage throughout the 19th century into the 1870s. London's Daily Telegraph agreed. Sullivan produced a few light operas in the late 1880s and 1890s that were of a more serious nature than most of the G&S series, including The Yeomen of the Guard, Haddon Hall and The Beauty Stone, but Ivanhoe (which ran for 155 consecutive performances, using alternating casts—a record then and now) survives as his only real grand opera.

Late in the century composers such as Isidore de Lara, Delius and Dame Ethel Smyth, owing to the difficulties of getting serious English operas staged at home, caused in part by the popularity of light opera, turned to the Continent to seek their fortune, with De Lara becoming very popular in France and in Italy (his opera Messaline being the first work by an Englishman to be produced at La Scala).

== 20th century – today ==
In the 20th century, English opera began to assert more independence, with works of Ralph Vaughan Williams and Rutland Boughton and later Benjamin Britten, who, in a series of fine works that remain in standard repertory today, revealed an excellent flair for the dramatic and superb musicality.
Nevertheless, foreign influence (now coming mainly from Wagner, Tchaikovsky and Strauss), was still strong. One example is Josef Holbrooke's The Cauldron of Annwn trilogy. The influence of Wagner's Ring can be seen in the choice of a mythological subject and also in the extensive use of leitmotivs, while harmony and orchestration are more reminiscent of Strauss.
Other British composers writing well-received operas in the late 20th century include Thomas Wilson (e.g. The Confessions of a Justified Sinner), Richard Rodney Bennett (e.g. The Mines of Sulphur), Harrison Birtwistle (Punch and Judy), Peter Maxwell Davies (Taverner) and Oliver Knussen (Where the Wild Things Are). Today composers such as Thomas Adès continue to export English opera abroad.

Also in the 20th century, American composers like George Gershwin (Porgy and Bess), Scott Joplin (Treemonisha), Gian Carlo Menotti, Leonard Bernstein (Candide), and Carlisle Floyd began to contribute English-language operas, frequently infused with touches of popular musical styles. They were followed by Philip Glass (Einstein on the Beach), Mark Adamo, John Adams (Nixon in China), and Jake Heggie. Moreover, non-native-English speaking composers have occasionally set English libretti (e.g. Kurt Weill, Street Scene; Igor Stravinsky, The Rake's Progress; Hans Werner Henze, We Come to the River; Tan Dun, The First Emperor).

== Audio link ==
Stay, Prince and hear
A scene from Purcell's Dido and Aeneas. The witches' messenger, in the form of Mercury, attempts to convince Aeneas to leave Carthage. Note the use of Italian-style recitative, a rarity in English opera at that time.

== See also ==
- Opera in Scotland
- Opera in Canada
