= Elizabeth Poole (singer) =

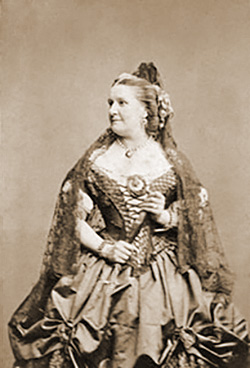
Elizabeth Poole, by Southwell Brothers (1860s)

Elizabeth Poole (1820–1906), was a British opera and concert soprano singer and actress of the 19th century.

== Biography ==
Elizabeth Poole was born on 5 April 1820 in Adam Street, Marylebone, London. She was the youngest daughter of John Lidbury Poole, the architect in charge of construction of the Royal Mint. Her mother (also Elizabeth) died when she was six, and she received her early musical education from an elder sister.

Her first stage appearance was at the Olympic Theatre pantomime on Boxing Day 1827, emerging from an oyster-shell to sing ‘Oysters, Sir’, to music by Rossini. Apprenticed in 1829 to the chorus master at Drury Lane, she enjoyed fame as a child prodigy and actress in London and Brighton. She played principal boy in Covent Garden pantomimes during the 1830s, and from 1836 began to appear in opera, beginning with Auber's The Bronze Horse at Drury Lane, where she also played a supporting role to Malibran in the premiere of Balfe's The Maid of Artois. Among many opera appearances, her teenage Donna Elvira in Mozart's Don Giovanni was notable.

In August 1839 she sailed for North America, appearing in nine operas at New York's Park Theatre, including Adina in L'elisir d'amore, and winning audience hearts. Returning to Britain, she sang Adalgisa in Norma (Liverpool, 1841) and operatic roles at Covent Garden, as well as resuming her career as pantomime principal boy. The Sacred Harmonic Society engaged her for Messiah (Exeter Hall, 1843) alongside Elizabeth Rainforth, John Braham and Henry Phillips. Her career met with a setback when she broke a leg in a riding accident: the bone was set by the surgeon Samuel Bacon (c.1799-1856), who became her husband at St Pancras Church, on 10 July 1845. Soon after, she created the breeches role of Lazarillo in William Vincent Wallace's hugely successful opera Maritana (15 November 1845).

Her varied concert and opera career blossomed during the late 1840s, and in 1851 she first played the title role in The Bohemian Girl; and when she played The Gypsy Queen in the same opera, at Sadler's Wells in May 1856, Balfe wrote her a new number, ‘Love smiles to deceive’. After nursing her husband through his final illness, she returned with a Hanover Square Rooms concert, after which the Daily News declared her ‘one of the purest and most genuine singers that the English school has ever possessed’ (3 April 1857). The following year she appeared as the Fool in King Lear.

Retiring from the stage by the mid-1860s, Poole began a successful career as a teacher, though retaining her vocal powers and continuing to appear in concerts until 1881. She outlived her children Elizabeth (1850–1905) and Henry (1852–1877), dying in Langley, Buckinghamshire on 14 January 1906.

== Critical appraisal ==
Grove described her mezzo-soprano voice as 'very mellow and sympathetic in quality', and added that 'in English songs and ballads she had no rival' (Grove's Dictionary).
