= Vivier (surname) =

Vivier is a surname. Notable people with the surname include:

- Basie Vivier (1927–2009), South African rugby union footballer
- Claude Vivier (1948–1983), Canadian composer of contemporary classical music
- Eugène Léon Vivier (1821–1900), French horn player
- Jacques Vivier (1930–2021), French professional cyclist
- Robert Vivier (1894–1989), Belgian poet and writer
- Roger Vivier (1907–1998), French fashion designer who specialized in shoes

== See also ==
- Viviers (disambiguation)
