= Vivier (disambiguation) =

Claude Vivier (1948–1983) was a Canadian composer of contemporary classical music.

== Other uses ==
=== People ===
Other notable people with the surname Vivier include:

- Basie Vivier (1927–2009), South African rugby union footballer
- Eugène Léon Vivier (1821–1900), French horn player
- Jacques Vivier (b. 1930), French professional cyclist
- Robert Vivier (1894–1989), Belgian poet and writer
- Roger Vivier (1907–1998), French fashion designer who specialized in shoes

=== Places ===
- Vivier-au-Court, a commune in the Ardennes department in northern France
- Le Vivier-sur-Mer, a commune in the Ille-et-Vilaine department of Brittany in northern France
- Épanchoir du Vivier, a siphon for water release from the Canal du Midi in France

== See also ==
- Viviers (disambiguation)
