= St James' Presbyterian Church of England, Bristol =

Ruined church in Bristol, England

Coordinates: 51.4587°N 2.5920°W

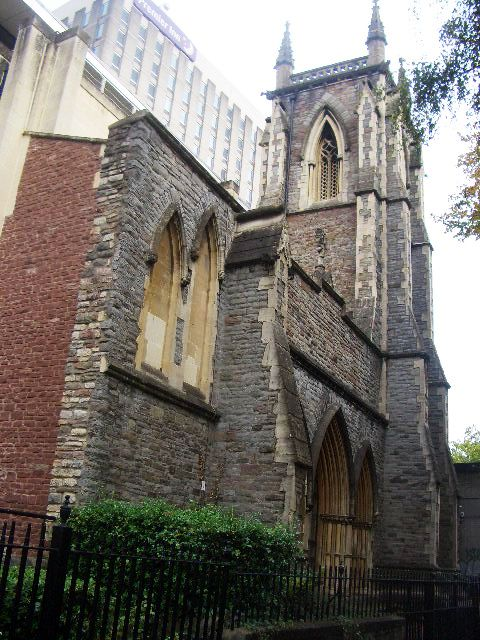
The remains of the church in 2011

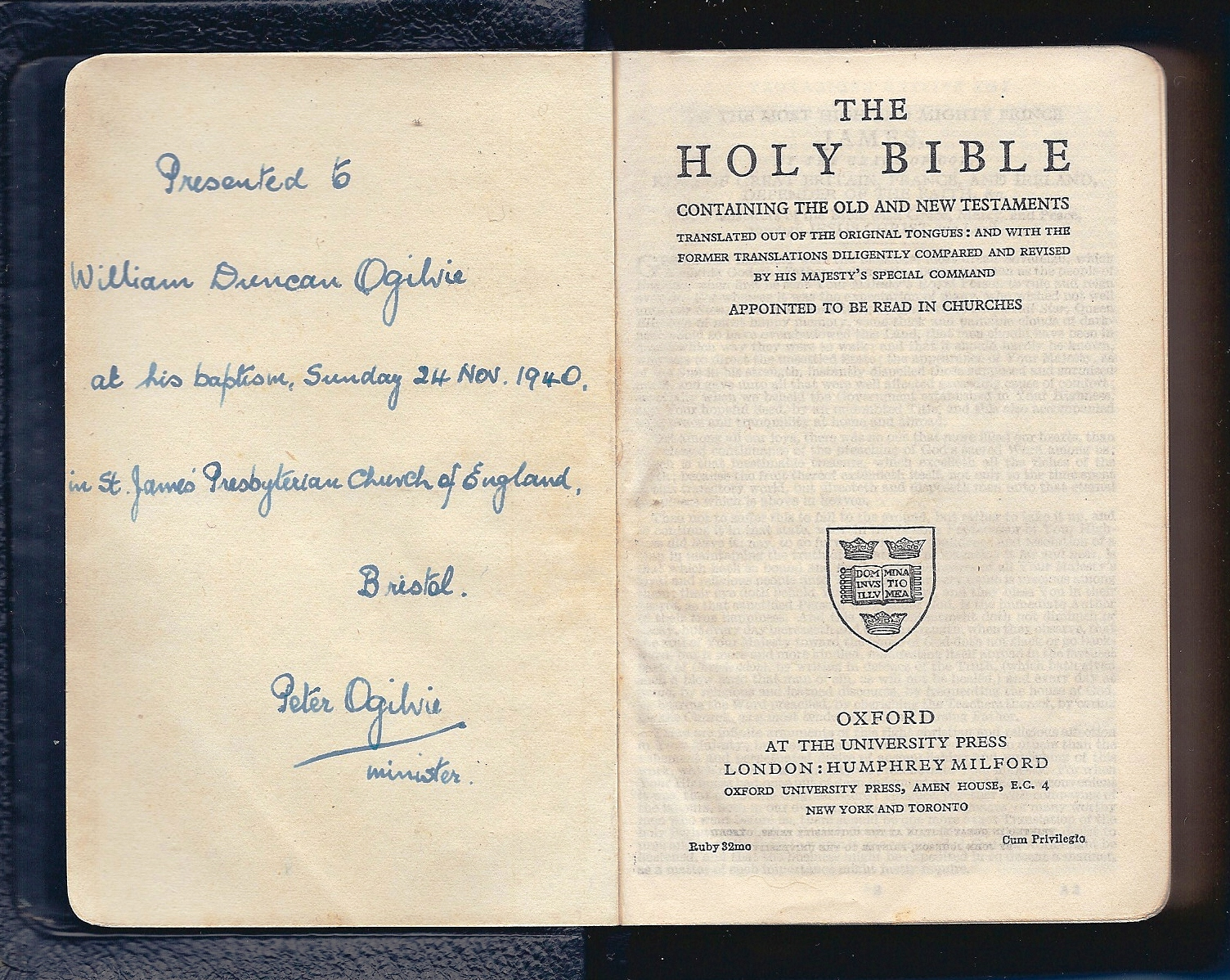
Record of a christening a few hours before the church was bombed

St James' Presbyterian Church (also known as Welsh Congregational Church) was a church in The Haymarket, St James, Bristol, England.

== History ==
The church was built in 1859. It was destroyed during The Blitz in World War II. In around 1953, St James's Presbyterian in Romney Avenue, Lockleaze was built.

In 1897, the church hosted a synod of the Presbyterian Church of England in order to commemorate Rev. William C. Burns becoming the church's first missionary to China when he arrived there in 1847. The moderator of the synod was Rev. H. L. Mackenzie, who spoke at length about his experiences over nearly four decades at the Presbyterian Church of England's Swatow Mission in China.

The remains of the Victorian-era St James' Church are just south of the current Bristol coach station. The church was bombed in the evening of 24 November 1940 and partly restored as a chapel in 1957. The tower still remains but the nave has been converted to offices.

In 1957, the church tower and lower doors were used as the walls of a courtyard for a small Welsh Congregational chapel designed by Eustace Button, who designed a number of churches in the area. This small chapel lay across the old church, with the old halls at the rear. The Eustace Button church was low with tip-up seats and a wide open-span ceiling. The Welsh congregation moved here from the Castle Street area where their chapel had been destroyed during bombing and not rebuilt. The Welsh Congregation closed the chapel in 1988 – the adjacent hall was in an appalling state of repair. The Victorian tower and doors were incorporated in the office development and the 1957 chapel and Victorian hall were demolished.
