= Mairead Buicke =

Irish operatic soprano

Mairead Buicke (born 1981 in Limerick) is an Irish operatic soprano active in concert and recital work as well as opera. She is currently a Company Principal with the English National Opera and a member of their Young Singers Programme. She started taking singing lessons at 14 and in 2003 graduated from the Royal Irish Academy of Music with a First-class honours degree in Performance. In 2004 she was a special prize winner in the Belvedere International Singing Competition in Vienna as well as winning the Gervase Elwes Cup at Dublin's Feis Ceoil festival.

Buicke's performances as the soprano soloist with Ireland's RTÉ National Symphony Orchestra include Mahler's Symphony No 8 and Symphony No 4, as well as RTÉ's eight part television series, "Mozart Sessions". She also sang Mimì in the RTÉ National Symphony Orchestra's concert performance of La bohème (2005) and Gretel in their concert performance of Humperdinck's Hansel and Gretel (2007). Her other operatic performances have included the title role in William Vincent Wallace's opera Maritana to celebrate the 275th anniversary of the Royal Dublin Society, and both Pacquette in Leonard Bernstein's Candide (2008), and First Lady in The Magic Flute (2007) for the English National Opera.
