= Maritana =

Opera by William Vincent Wallace

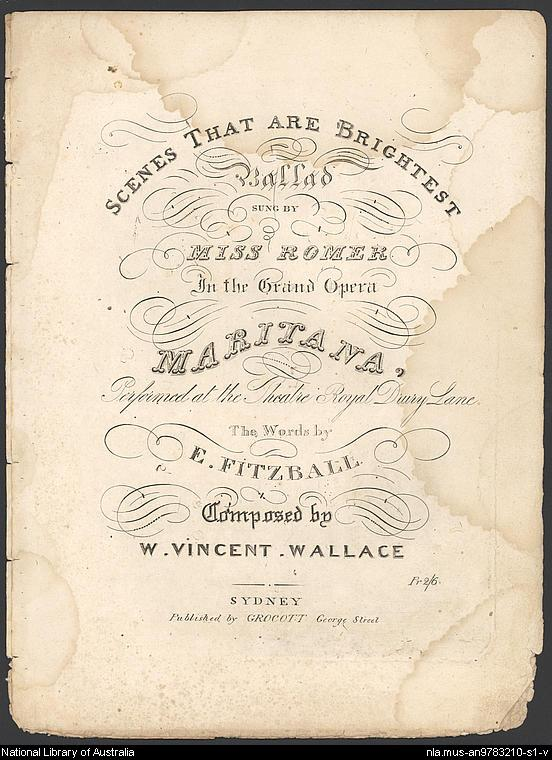
Sheet music cover to Maritana

Maritana is a three-act opera including both spoken dialogue and some recitatives, composed by William Vincent Wallace, with a libretto by Edward Fitzball (1792–1873). The opera is based on the 1844 French play Don César de Bazan by Adolphe d'Ennery and Philippe François Pinel (Dumanoir), which was also the source material for Jules Massenet's opéra comique Don César de Bazan (the character of Don César de Bazan first appeared in Victor Hugo's Ruy Blas). The opera premiered at the Theatre Royal, Drury Lane on 15 November 1845.

The first of six operas by Wallace, the work is often cited as an inspiration for a plot device in Gilbert and Sullivan's comic opera The Yeomen of the Guard in which a man weds a woman while awaiting execution in prison, escapes and, while he is disguised, the couple fall in love.

== Performance history ==
Maritana was first produced at the Theatre Royal, Drury Lane under Alfred Bunn's management on 15 November 1845, conducted on opening night by the composer. It was produced the following year in Dublin and Philadelphia, and soon afterwards in Vienna, with further performances in New York (1848, 1854, 1857, 1865 and 1868). In 1873, Maritana became the first opera produced in England by the Carl Rosa Opera Company at Manchester. It was revived in Dublin in 1877, and in London at Her Majesty's Theatre in 1880, in an Italian version by Mattei. A performance in Denver, Colorado, in 1881, inaugurated the Tabor Grand Opera House. A 1902 production was seen at Covent Garden. It was produced again at the London Lyceum in 1925 and at Sadler's Wells in 1931, remaining popular until the middle of the 20th century.

The Royal Dublin Society revived the work in concert form in 2006, with an orchestra conducted by Proinnsías Ó Duinn and singers led by Mairead Buicke and Robin Tritschler. The abiding Irish interest in the work is reflected in the works of James Joyce, in his novel Ulysses, and his stories "The Dead" and "A Mother" (both collected in Dubliners).

Silent film versions of the opera were released in 1922, adapted by Frank Miller and directed by George Wynn, and 1927, directed by H. B. Parkinson.

== Roles ==
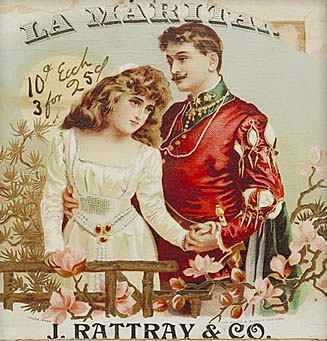
Cigar box depicting a scene from Maritana

Role	Voice type	Premiere cast, 15 November 1845 (Conductor: the composer, on opening night, then Francesco Schira)
Charles II, King of Spain	bass	Conrado Borrani
Don José de Santarém, his minister	bass	H. Phillips
Don Cæsar de Bazan	tenor	William Harrison
Marquis de Montefiori	bass	H. Horncastle
Lazarillo, a poor page boy	mezzo-soprano	Elizabeth Poole
Alcalde	bass	Morgan
Captain of Guards	baritone	S. Jones
Maritana, a gypsy	soprano	Emma Romer and Elizabeth Rainforth
Marchioness de Montefiori	mezzo-soprano or soprano	Mrs. Selby
Boatman		
Soldiers, populace, and gypsies (chorus)

== Synopsis ==
=== Act 1 ===
Maritana is a gypsy street singer in Madrid. Charles II, the young king of Spain, lurking in the public square in disguise, is taken with her beauty. His devious minister, Don José, sees this and encourages his affections, hoping that the King will compromise himself. José intends to reveal the King's infidelity to further his own favour with the Queen. José also fills Maritana's head with visions of a wealthy life. Don Cæsar de Bazan is a down-on-his-luck but jovial nobleman who is arrested and sentenced to death by public hanging for duelling during Holy Week. Maritana admires the dashing Don Cæsar, who had fought to defend a poor apprentice boy named Lazarillo from mistreatment by his master.

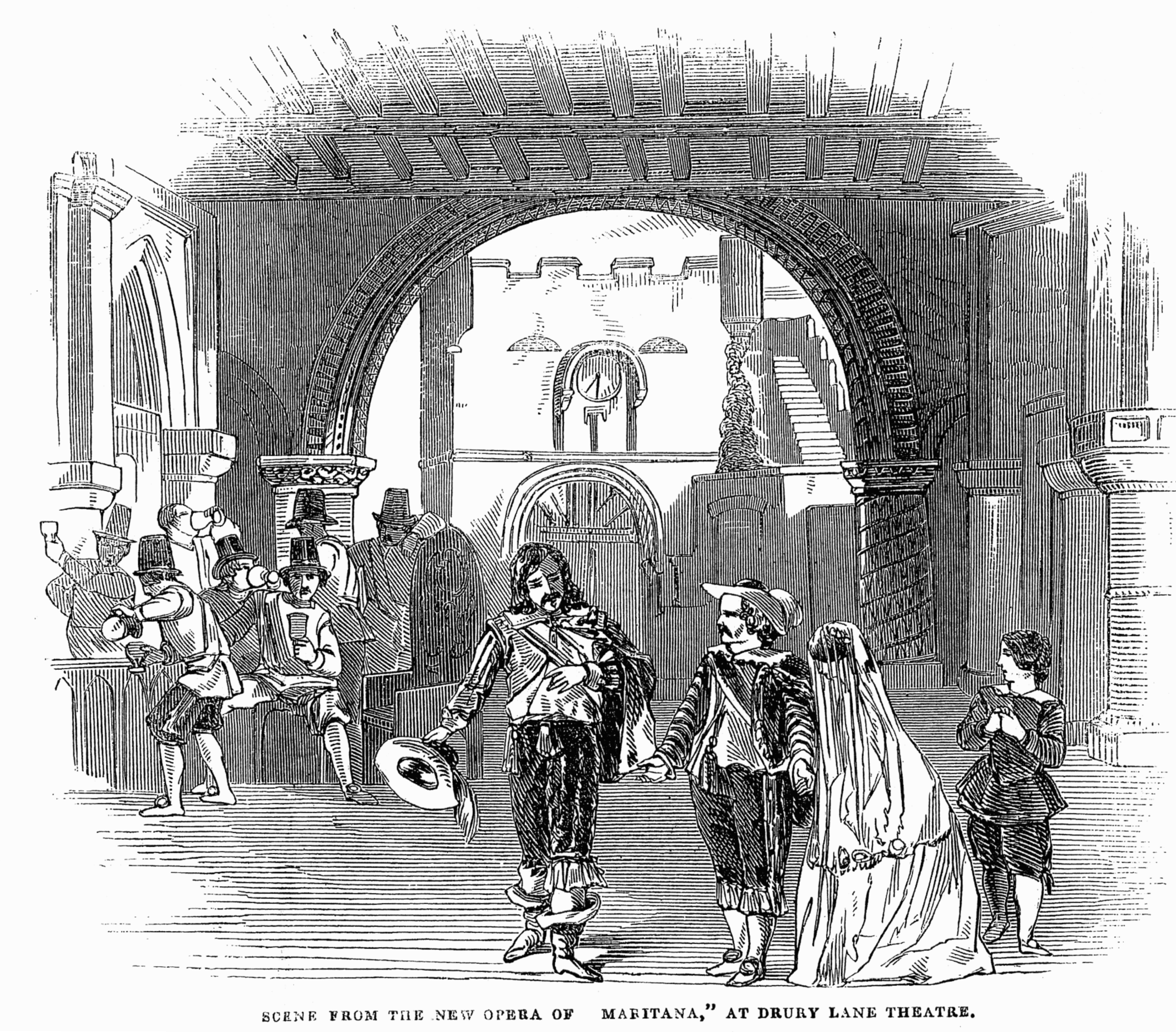
The wedding of Don Cæsar and Maritana

=== Act 2 ===
On the day of Don Cæsar's execution, a pardon arrives from the King, but it is maliciously intercepted by Don José. José offers Cæsar a soldier's death (shooting instead of public hanging) if he agrees to marry a veiled lady before his execution; Cæsar agrees. José brings the heavily veiled Maritana to marry Cæsar before the execution, with the intention of making her a nobleman's widow; he tells her that she is marrying the King. While Don Cæsar and his executioners participate in the wedding feast, Lazarillo removes the lead shot from all the weapons. The execution is carried out, Cæsar feigns death, and he later escapes and goes to a ball at the Montefiori villa, seeking his new wife.

Don José brings Maritana to see the Marquis and Marchioness de Montefiori at the ball, asking them to pretend that she is the Marquis's niece. José brings her to meet the King, but Maritana is surprised and disappointed to find that Charles is not the dashing man that she had married. Meanwhile, Don Cæsar arrives at the luxurious villa and demands his bride. José brings the old Marchioness to present to him. Since Cæsar did not see his bride, he believes José's story that this is she. He is so disappointed that he agrees to sign a paper relinquishing her. Just as he is about to do this, he hears Maritana's voice in the background. He recognizes her as his bride and tries to claim her, but she is quickly spirited away to the royal palace at Aranjuez, and he is arrested.

=== Act 3 ===
Now imprisoned in the royal palace, Maritana wonders what will become of her; she realises that she was the victim of José's plot and, in her purity, repulses the King's advances. Don Cæsar arrives to finally discover from the King that he has been pardoned. He demands his bride, but José insists on his arrest as an escaped prisoner. Before explanations can be made, the King is summoned by the Queen to the Palace. Cæsar and Maritana meet and find out that their love is mutual; they decide to appeal to the Queen. While waiting in the palace gardens, Cæsar overhears José telling the Queen that the King has a rendezvous with Maritana that evening. Cæsar appears, denounces José as a traitor, and slays him. When the King hears of Cæsar's loyalty, in his gratitude he repents of his designs on Maritana and gives her to Cæsar, whom he makes Governor of Valencia.

== Musical numbers ==
Act 1

- "Sing pretty maiden" – Chorus
- "It was a Knight" – Maritana
- "'Tis the harp in the air" – Maritana
- "Angels that around us hover" – Chorus
- "Of fairy wand had I the power" – Maritana and Don José
- "All the world over" – Don Cæsar
- "See the culprit! Quick, arrest him" – Quartet, Chorus
- "Pretty Gitana, tell us what the fates decree" – Chorus
- Finale "Farewell, my gallant Captain" – Don Cæsar, ensemble

Act 2

- "Alas! those chimes so sweetly stealing" – Lazarillo
- "Hither as I came" – Don Cæsar
- "Turn on, old Time" – Trio Don Cæsar, Lazarillo, Don José
- "Yes, let me like a soldier fall" – Don Cæsar
- "In happy moments, day by day" – Don José
- "Health to the Lady" – Quartet and Chorus
- "Oh! what pleasure" – Chorus
- Waltz – Orchestra
- "Hear me, gentle Maritana" – The King
- "There is a flow'r that bloometh" – Don Cæsar
- "Ah! confusion! What delusion!" – Quartet incl. Don Cæsar
- Finale – "That voice! 'tis hers" – Don Cæsar, ensemble

Act 3

- Intro. and Recit. "How dreary to my heart" – Maritana
- "Scenes that are the brightest" – Maritana
- "This heart by woe o'ertaken" – Don José
- "I am King of Spain" – Duet Don Cæsar and the King
- "Oh, Maritana! wild woodflow'r" – Duet Don Cæsar and Maritana
- "Sainted Mother, guide his footsteps" – Duet Maritana and Lazarillo
- "Remorse and Dishonour" – Trio Maritana, Don Cæsar and the King
- Rondo-Finale "With rapture glowing" – Maritana, Chorus

== Reception ==
The opera's initial reception at Drury Lane was enthusiastic, with the critic of The Musical World generally commenting favorably on the composer, librettist, melodies and instrumentation.

In a later assessment, George P. Upton in The Standard Operas: their plots, their music, and their composers (1910) judged that Maritana "is one of the sprightliest and brightest of all the English operas. ... "I hear it again" ... is one of the sweetest and most delicate songs in any of the lighter operas. ... [O]ne of the most admired of all English songs [is] "Scenes that are the brightest". ... The freshness, brightness, and gracefulness of the music of this little opera, combined with the unusual interest and delicate humor of the story, have always commended it to popular admiration." The Victor Book of the Opera, in 1915, called the opera "beloved for its tunefulness and its sentimental music. The ideal of opera fifty years ago was that of quiet, unaffected sweetness, and the composer in his Maritana achieved that quality to perfection."

== Other associations ==
A beach resort in St. Pete Beach, Florida, The Don CeSar, is named for the character Don Cæsar, and the restaurant there is named Maritana.

== Recordings ==
Columbia DB613-618 (1932; 6 records 10" 78 rpm)

- Principal singers: Miriam Licette as Maritana, Clara Serena as Lazarello, Heddle Nash as Don Caesar, Dennis Noble as Don José
- Conductor: Clarence Raybould, with Grand Opera Company and orchestra.

Marco Polo 8.223406-7, double-CD (1996)

- Principal singers: Majella Cullagh (soprano) as Maritana, Lynda Lee (mezzo) as Lazarello, Paul Charles Clarke (tenor) as Don Cæsar de Bazan, Ian Caddy (baritone) as Don José de Santarem, Damien Smith (baritone) as Captain of the Guard, Quentin Hayes (bass) as the King of Spain
- Conductor: Proinnsías Ó Duinn, with RTÉ Philharmonic Choir and RTÉ Concert Orchestra
- Recording date: 19 and 20 September 1995
- Re-issued: Naxos 8.660308-9, double-CD (2011)
