= Frédéric Louis Ritter =

Frédéric Louis Ritter (22 June 1834 – 6 July 1891) was a French composer, choral conductor, teacher, and author.

== Biography ==
He was born in Strasbourg, France on 22 June 1834.

He studied under Moritz, Hauser, and Schletterer. In 1856 he came to the United States, resided for some years in Cincinnati, where he founded the Cecilia and Philharmonic Societies, and in 1861 moved to New York City and conducted the Sacred Harmonic Society and Arion Society.

In New York, he married Fannie Raymond, his second wife.

In 1867 he organized New York's first musical festival. The same year, he was appointed professor of music at Vassar College, although he didn't move to the campus in Poughkeepsie until 1874.

He received a doctorate from New York University in music in 1878.

He died in Antwerp, Belgium on 6 July 1891.

== Legacy ==
Albert Metcalf purchased Ritter's music library at auction and donated it to Tufts University by 1901.

== Works ==
He composed many songs, orchestral, church, and piano works. He wrote several works on music with his wife:

- History of Music (1870–74)
- History Of Music in the Form of Lectures (1876)
- Music in England (1883)
- Music in America (1883)
- The Student's History Of Music (1884)
- Practical Harmony, Especially Designed For The Use Of Piano-Forte Students (1888)
