= Arion Society of New York =

German-American musical society

The Arion Society was a German-American musical society. It was founded in January 1854 to promote "the perpetuation of love for some of the characteristic elements of German civilization". It was disbanded because of Anti-German sentiment following World War I.

== History ==
It was founded in January 1854 to promote "the perpetuation of love for some of the characteristic elements of German civilization".

They sponsored the Arion Ball in 1892 at Madison Square Garden to celebrate the four hundredth anniversary of Columbus's discovery of America. The society commissioned Bolossy Kiralfy for the event. The 1898 ball, also held at Madison Square Garden, had an Egyptian theme.

It was disbanded because of Anti-German sentiment following World War I.

== Conductors ==
- Carl Anschütz (1813-1870) 1860 to 1863.
- Frédéric Louis Ritter (1831-1891) 1864 to 1867.
- Leopold Damrosch (1832–1885) 1871 to 1883.
- Frank van der Stucken (1858–1929) 1884 to 1895. He was the first American born conductor. He gave his first concert in April 1884 and he resigned in 1895.
- Julius Lorenz, became director in July 1895.
- Carl Bergmann (1821-1876), held several tenures as conductor.

== See also ==
- Liederkranz of the City of New York
