= Karl Anschütz =

American classical composer (1813/1815–1870)

- Born: 1813/1815; Koblenz, Prussia
- Died: 30 December 1870; New York City
- Occupations: Composer, musical director

Karl Anschütz (1813/1815 Koblenz, Kingdom of Prussia – 30 December 1870 New York City) was a Kingdom of Prussia-born musical director and composer who founded the German Opera in New York City. He was the son of Josef Andreas Anschütz and the brother of Hermann Anschütz.

== Biography ==
Anschütz's father Joseph Andreas Anschütz was an eminent musician and was in charge of a school for vocal and instrumental instruction. His early musical studies were made under his father, and in 1837 he was sent to study under Friedrich Schneider, of Dessau, whose daughter he married. His brother was the painter Hermann Anschütz.

He then returned to Koblenz, where he became conductor of the royal musical institution and of the orchestra at the theatre, with the title of royal musical director. In 1848 he led the orchestra at Nuremberg, and in 1849 was conductor of the German opera at Amsterdam. During the same year, he went to London with a German opera troupe, and subsequently he became leader of the orchestra at Drury Lane Theatre. He conducted in 1849 and 1850 the Wednesday Concerts in Exeter Hall; at this venue he gave Beethoven's ninth symphony with an orchestra of 250 musicians and a chorus of 500 singers. He also conducted the Italian opera at Dublin, Edinburgh, Glasgow, and elsewhere in Great Britain.

In 1857 he came to the United States with Bernard Ullman's Italian opera troupe, which he conducted until 1860. From 1860 to 1862, he was conductor for the Arion Society. In 1862, he founded the German opera in New York, and was active in the establishment of the New York Conservatory of Music. In 1869 he served as musical director of the New York section of the mass choruses at the Baltimore singing festival. He was also a composer of some ability, and wrote out for brass instruments the nine symphonies of Beethoven, of which two were performed.
