= H. L. Mackenzie =

Scottish medical missionary and minister (1833–1899)

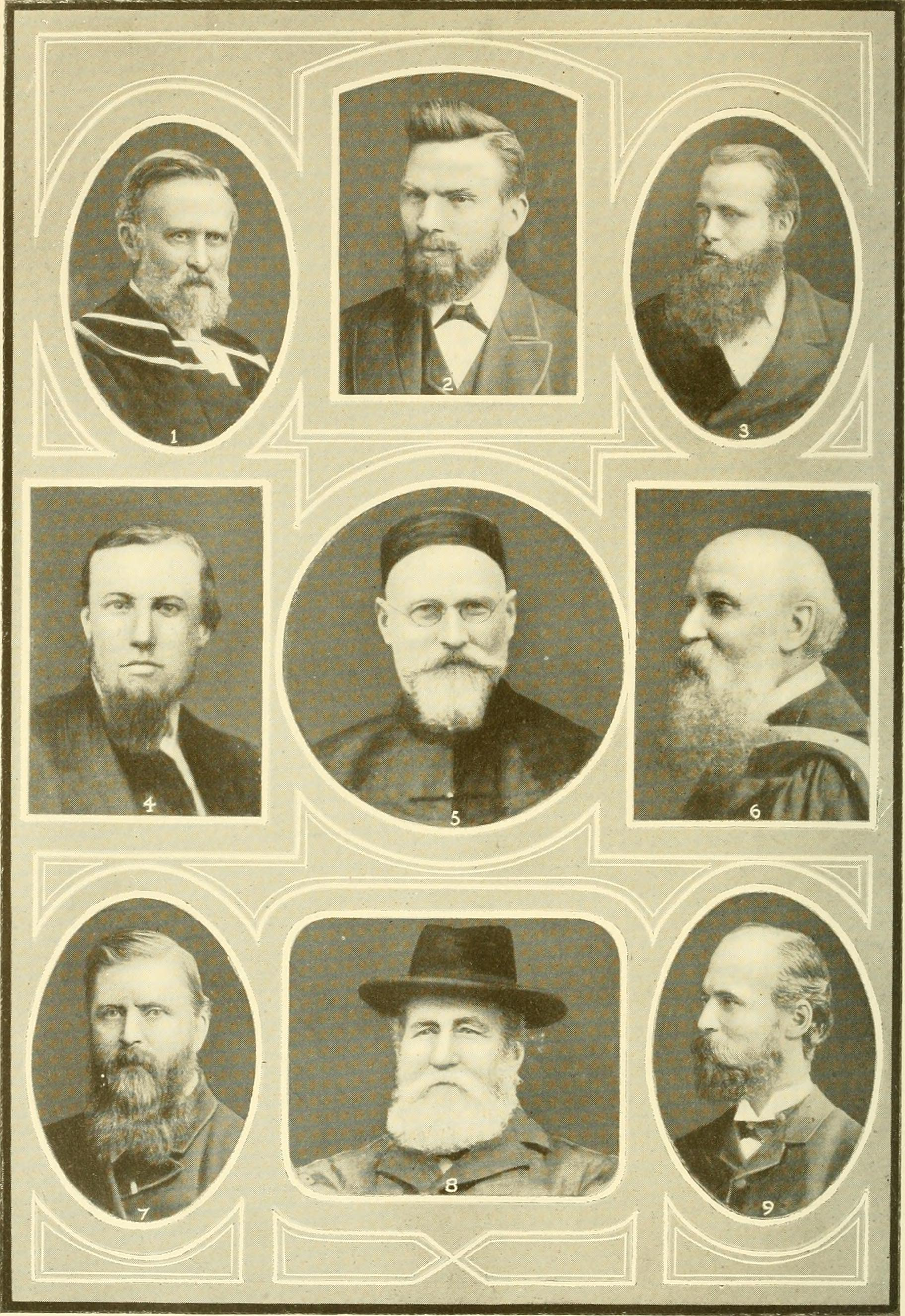
- H. L. Mackenzie (top-left)
- Born: 22 February 1833; Inverness, Scotland
- Died: 26 December 1899 (aged 66); Shantou, China
- Education: King's College, Aberdeen (MA); New College, Edinburgh (DD)

Hur Libertas "H. L." Mackenzie (22 February 1833 – 26 December 1899) was a leading Scottish medical missionary and minister for the Presbyterian Church of England who was revered by the church for his nearly four decades of service to their mission at Shantou. During his tenure at the mission he made numerous lasting contributions such as his translation of the scriptures into the local Swatow dialect, ensuring the accessibility of important religious works, and establishment of out-stations that greatly expanded the mission's reach. Outside of Shantou, Mackenzie founded the Taiwan Mission on behalf of the Presbyterian Church and was invited to speak at missionary conferences in an array of cities that included Philadelphia, Shanghai, and Bristol.

== Early life and education ==
Mackenzie was born in Inverness, Inverness-shire, Scotland on 22 February 1833. He was also christened in Inverness soon thereafter on 13 March 1833. Mackenzie was the fourteenth youngest of the seventeen children of Thomas Mackenzie and Grace Fraser. Mackenzie graduated from The University and King's College of Aberdeen, which has been merged into what is now known simply as the University of Aberdeen, with a Master of Arts (MA) degree in March 1854. He subsequently received his postgraduate theological training at New College in the University of Edinburgh, where he received his degree as a Doctor of Divinity (DD).

== Personal life ==
Mackenzie married his wife, Mary Bailie, in 1871 in London’s Marylebone neighborhood. Bailie joined him in Shantou in 1872. She made numerous contributions to the mission that complemented her husband's work, such as her important role in the construction of a boarding school for girls in 1873. Additionally, Bailie often accompanied her husband in his day-to-day missionary functions.

Mackenzie had two sons and two daughters: Theodore Charles Mackenzie, Thomas Alexander Mackenzie, Mary Lina Mackenzie, and Grace Margaret Mackenzie. Theodore, Mary, and Grace lived in Scotland and were visited by their parents in 1879, when Mackenzie and his wife were granted a furlough in Scotland. Thomas, the youngest, was born in China and remained with his parents in Shantou.

== Missionary work ==
=== Work in Shantou ===
Mackenzie arrived at the Presbyterian Church of England’s foreign mission in Shantou in 1860 and aided in the construction of the mission’s main hospital, which was completed in 1863. The mission would eventually be expanded to contain a smaller hospital for overflow and a hospital designated for women, in addition to the main hospital. Among these three structures, the mission was able to handle thousands of patients per year.

After the completion of the main hospital, Mackenzie began to establish out-stations in surrounding areas that brought more patients in contact with the mission, thereby exposing more Chinese to the gospel. The Shantou mission was constructed in such a way that it was built around a "well-equipped center" from which missionaries would "work outwards to surrounding counties," thereby prompting Mackenzie to venture into unfamiliar areas that lacked requisite medical infrastructure.

Mackenzie's work at the Shantou mission was highly Evangelistic; Mackenzie would travel to villages and the individual households within them to establish contact with the locals and preach the virtues of Christianity. Some of these locals would subsequently join Mackenzie in the English Presbyterian Mission, assisting Mackenzie and the other missionaries in spreading the gospel and providing medical care. For those who didn’t join the mission directly, Mackenzie still inspired Chinese Christians who took it upon themselves to build new churches, convert fellow Chinese, and influence missionaries to open new out-stations in underserved areas.

A Mission Printing Press, which was established in 1880, published scriptures and other religious works in Swatow dialect (the local vernacular), which were subsequently printed and distributed. Mackenzie led efforts at the Printing Press to translate the scriptures into the Swatow dialect. Mackenzie worked across several decades, alongside other Reverends such as George Smith and J.C. Gibson, to translate the Epistles of John and Jude from the New Testament. For many years Mackenzie also contributed to the press's monthly publication, titled Church News.

Mackenzie helped the mission to greatly expand its educational opportunities in Shantou during the 1870s: a girls’ boarding school, theological college, and boys’ middle school were opened in 1873, 1874, and 1876, respectively. Thanks in large part to this educational infrastructure, the Church institutions in Shantou were largely able to be staffed by Chinese ministers and teachers, allowing the foreign missionaries in Shantou to pursue other endeavors.

=== Founder of Taiwan Mission ===
Mackenzie successfully expanded the scope of the English Presbyterian Mission’s operations during his tenure as a missionary. In 1860, along with Carstairs Douglas, a fellow medical missionary of Scottish origin, Mackenzie identified the suitability of Taiwan as a mission field. At the discretion of Mackenzie, the English Presbyterian Foreign Missions Committee subsequently sent a number of ministers to Taiwan. The first of these ministers was James Laidlaw Maxwell, who settled in the city of Takau on 29 May 1865. The presence of a British consul in Takau helped to facilitate the establishment of this mission.

=== Other missionary endeavors ===
Mackenzie would periodically serve the Presbyterian Church of England in a non-medical capacity in regions outside his designated mission location of Shantou.

On 10 May 1871, Mackenzie was invited to speak at "a meeting in support of the Foreign missions of the Free Church of Scotland, and of the Presbyterian Church of England." The event was held in Exeter Hall, Strand, London and featured numerous other missionaries from regions such as Bombay and Amoy. Sir D. F. MacLeod, the former Lieutenant Governor of Punjab in British India, presided over the meeting.

Mackenzie was chosen to represent England at the Second General Counsel of the Presbyterian Alliance, which was held in Philadelphia. The Counsel lasted from 23 September to 3 October 1880, and welcomed any church organized on Presbyterian principles, featuring delegates from a variety of nations across the world, such as Australia and India.

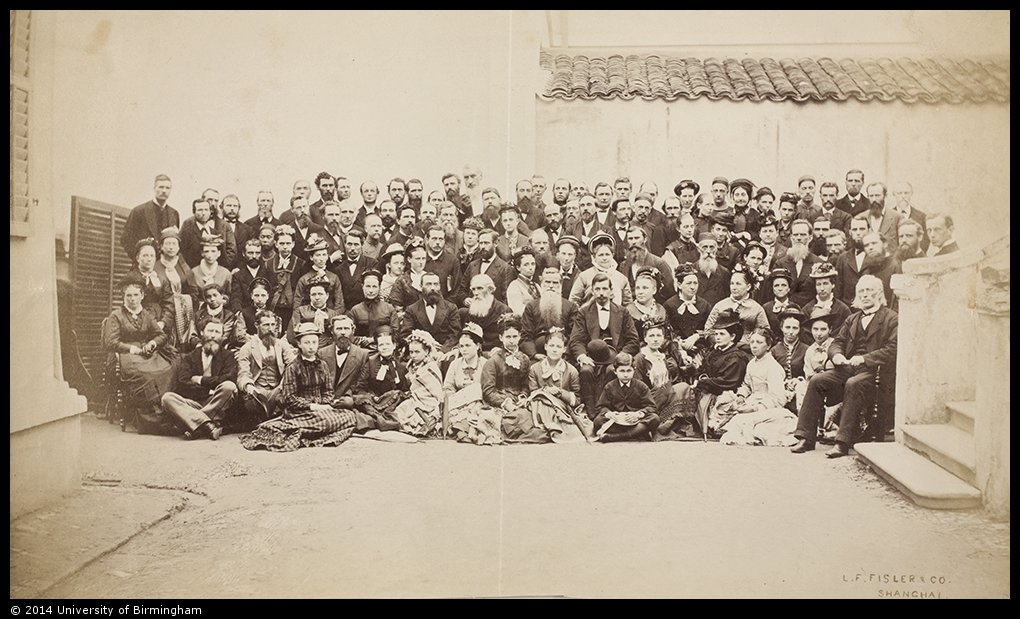
Members of Missionary Conference held at Shanghai in May 1877

In recognition of his thirty-six years of dedicated service as a medical missionary for the Presbyterian Church of England, Mackenzie was appointed Moderator of a synod for the church in 1897. The synod was held at St. James' Presbyterian Church of England, Bristol and was intended to commemorate Rev. William C. Burns becoming the church’s first missionary to China when he arrived there in 1847. Burns also worked in Shantou for a time, from March 1856 until October 1858, though his tenure there did not overlap with that of Mackenzie. At the synod, Mackenzie spoke at length about his tenure in Shantou and was very well received by the clergy of the church.

On 17 May 1877, Mackenzie featured at a missionary conference in Shanghai that included missionaries from a variety of fields who were working in China at the time. Mackenzie spoke after Rev. Frederick Foster Gough and gave his speech "On the Duty of the Foreign Residents Aiding in the Evangelization of China—and the best means of doing so."

== Death and legacy ==
Mackenzie died while in Shantou on 26 December 1899. He was survived by his four children, though his wife had died several years earlier. Mackenzie was admired for his willingness to venture away from the center of the mission and out into surrounding areas, where he would provide medical assistance and spread the gospel to previously overlooked communities. Mackenzie persevered in his missionary work in spite of the absence of three of his children, who remained in Scotland, and the death of his wife, who died while accompanying Mackenzie at the Shantou mission. Mackenzie laid the groundwork for the continued development of the Shantou mission after his death, with an Anglo-Chinese college being constructed in 1905–06. His founding of the Taiwan Mission and translation of the scriptures into Shantou dialect were also accomplishments that would have a meaningful impact on future generations of Chinese.
