= Jimmy Balfe =

Irish association football player

Personal information
- Full name: James Balfe
- Date of birth: 9 September 1876
- Place of birth: Dublin, Ireland
- Position: Full back

Senior career*
Years	Team	Apps	(Gls)
- Reginald
1906–1908	Bohemians		
1908–1910	Shelbourne	33	(1)
1910–1915	Bohemians		

International career
1906–1907	Ireland Amateurs	2	(0)
1908	Irish League XI	1	(0)
1909–1910	Ireland	2	(0)
- * Club domestic league appearances and goals

James Balfe was an Irish footballer who played as a full back in the Irish League for Bohemians and Shelbourne. He won two caps for Ireland and represented the Irish League and Ireland at amateur level.

== Personal life ==
Balfe's older brother John was also a footballer. He worked as a brush maker.

== Honours ==
Shelbourne

- City Cup: 1908–09
- Leinster Senior Cup: 1908–09
