= Balfe =

Balfe is an Irish surname. It is derived from Gaelic balbh meaning 'stammering'.

== Notable people ==
- Brendan Balfe (born 1945), Irish radio personality
- Caitriona Balfe (born 1979), Irish actress and fashion model
- David Balfe (born 1958), English musician and record producer
- Jimmy Balfe (born 1876), Irish footballer
- Lorne Balfe (born 1976), Scottish composer
- Michael William Balfe (1808–1870), Irish composer
- Richard Balfe (born 1944), English politician
- Rupert Balfe (1890–1915), Australian rules footballer
- Shaun Balfe (born 1972), English racing driver
- Veronica Cooper (née Balfe) (1913–2000), American socialite and actress
- Victoria Balfe (1837–1871), Franco-Irish singer, daughter of Michael William Balfe
