= Eugène Léon Vivier =

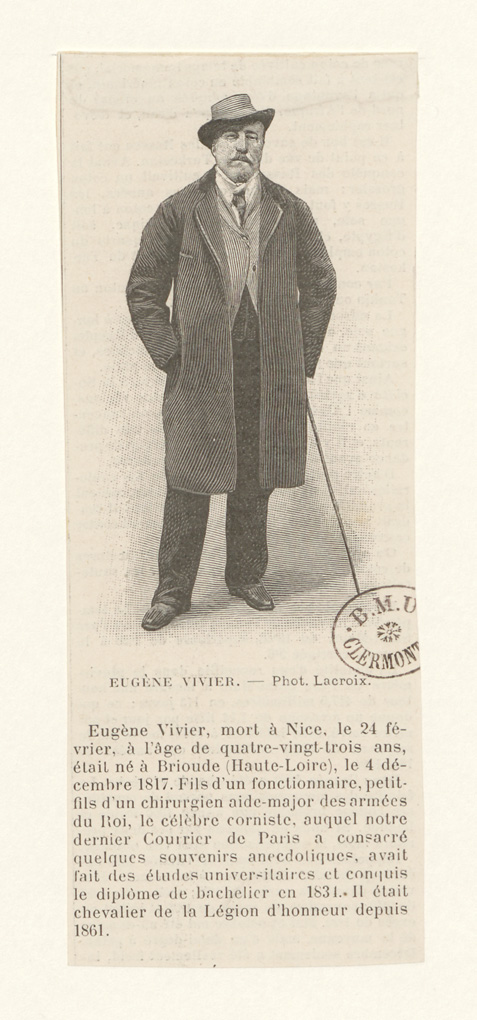

Eugène Léon Vivier (1821–1900) was a French horn player, admired by Napoleon III.

== Life ==
He was born in 1821 in Brioude; his father was a tax collector. He moved to Paris, where he became a member of the orchestra of the Théâtre-Italien.

He studied under Jacques-François Gallay. He became a successful soloist, and played for Louis Philippe I at the Château d'Eu. On his recommendation, Vivier visited London in 1848, where he appeared at the Wednesday Concerts at Exeter Hall. From 1870 he was a favourite of Napoleon III, who gave him sinecures, including an inspectorship of mines.

With a secret device, he was able to play up to four notes at once on the horn. He was known for playing practical jokes: an obituarist wrote that "in their day they were the talk of Europe". He published in 1900 an autobiography, said to be largely fictitious, La Vie e les Aventures d'un Corniste.

Vivier died in Nice in 1900.
