= Viviers =

Viviers is the name or part of the name of several communes in France:

- Viviers, Ardèche, in the Ardèche département, capital of the Vivarais
  - Roman Catholic Diocese of Viviers, Ardèche
- Viviers, Moselle, in the Moselle département
- Viviers, Yonne, in the Yonne département
- Viviers-du-Lac, in the Savoie département
- Viviers-le-Gras, in the Vosges département
- Viviers-lès-Lavaur, in the Tarn département
- Viviers-lès-Montagnes, in the Tarn département
- Viviers-lès-Offroicourt, in the Vosges département
- Viviers-sur-Artaut, in the Aube département
- Viviers-sur-Chiers, in the Meurthe-et-Moselle département

== People ==
Viviers is also a surname, including that of:

- Casper Viviers (born 1988), Namibian rugby union player

== See also ==
- Vivier (disambiguation)
