= Presbyterian Church of England =

Christian denomination in England

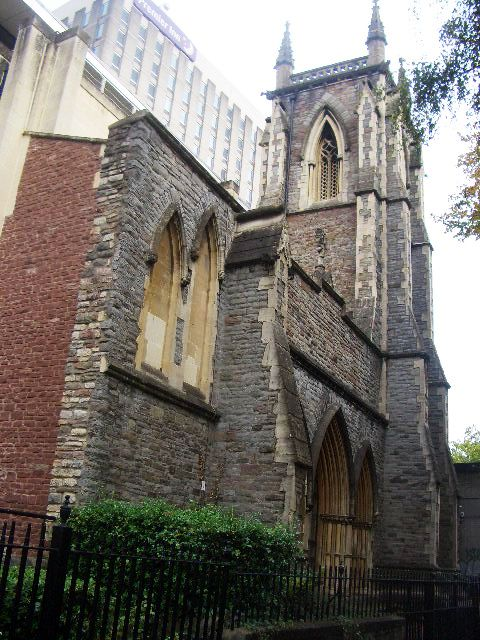
St James' Presbyterian Church, Bristol

The Presbyterian Church of England was a late-19th-century and 20th-century Presbyterian denomination in England. The church's origins lay in the 1876 merger of the English congregations of the chiefly Scottish United Presbyterian Church with various other Presbyterian congregations in England. In 1972, the Presbyterian Church of England merged with the Congregational Church in England and Wales to become the United Reformed Church.

== See also ==
- English Presbyterianism
