= Elena D'Angri =

Greek opera singer (1821–1886)

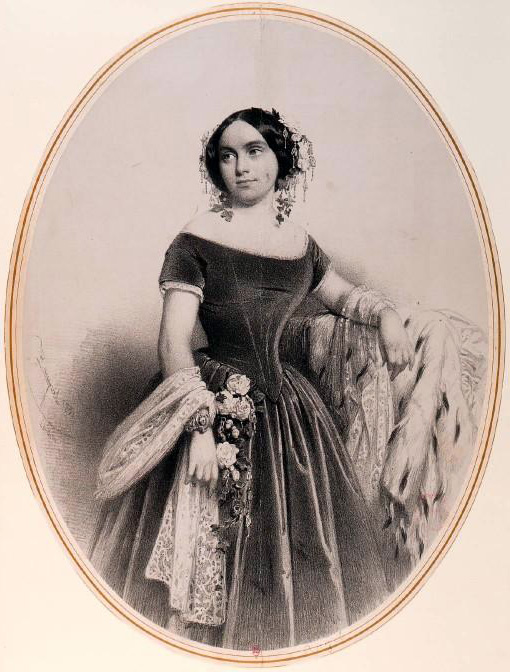
Elena D'Angri, circa 1851

Elena D'Angri Vitturi (also known as Elena Angri; May 1821 or 1824 in Corfu – 29 August 1886 in Barcelona) was a Greek-born operatic contralto of Italian origin who was active in the mid-19th century in European opera houses and in the United States.

The daughter of Saverio Angri (originally from Naples) and Maria Vitturi di Giovanni, her real name was Nazarena Mattia Elena Catterina. She was baptised on 10 June 1821 at the Roman Catholic Cathedral of Saint James and Saint Christopher in Corfu, Greece. She studied singing with Salvatore Taglioni and Giuseppe Doglia. She made her opera debut in Lucca in 1843 and was engaged by La Scala in 1844. She divided her time between the Vienna State Opera and La Scala from 1845 through 1847, and in 1846 was named a Kammersänger by Ferdinand I of Austria. Her debut in London was in 1849.

During the 1855 and 1856 season at the Teatro Regio in Turin, she performed in La Cenerentola (as Angelina), The Barber of Seville (as Rosina), and Il trovatore (as Azucena). Later in 1856, she performed for the first time in New York City, accompanied by the pianist and composer Sigismond Thalberg.
