= Exeter Hall =

Building used as a public meeting place in London, demolished 1907

Coordinates: 51°30′40″N 0°07′16″W

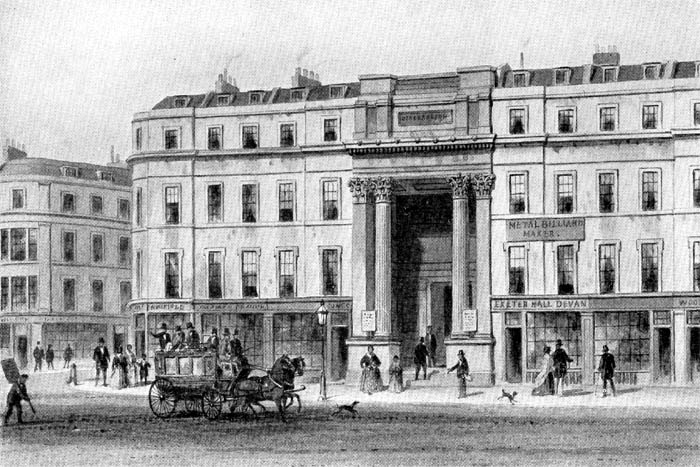
Engraving depicting the exterior of Exeter Hall, reproduced on a 1905 postcard.

Exeter Hall was a large public meeting place on the north side of the Strand in central London, opposite where the Savoy Hotel now stands. From 1831 until 1907 Exeter Hall was the venue for many great gatherings of activists for various causes, most notably the anti-slavery movement and the meeting of the Anti–Corn Law League in 1846.

== History ==
London in the 19th century was the most populous city in the world, and yet its indoor meeting places were inadequate. The largest, the Freemasons' Hall, could only fit about 1600 people, so a consortium decided that it was time to build a larger venue. Exeter Hall was erected between 1829 and 1831 to designs by John Peter Gandy, the brother of the visionary architect Joseph Michael Gandy. The hall was built on the site of Exeter Exchange, which had been famous for its menagerie of wild animals; prior to the Exeter 'Change, as it was known, the site had been occupied since the 16th century by part of Exeter House (formerly Burghley House and Cecil House), the London residence of the Earls of Exeter.

The official opening date for Exeter Hall was 29 March 1831. The façade on The Strand featured a prominent recessed central entrance behind a screen of paired Corinthian columns set into a reserved Late Georgian front of housing over shopfronts. The smaller auditorium could hold around 1,000 people, and the main one, more than 4,000.

Exeter Hall hosted religious and philanthropic meetings, including those of the British and Foreign Bible Society (founded in 1804), the Protestant Reformation Society (founded in 1827), the Protestant Association (revived in 1835), and the Trinitarian Bible Society (founded in 1831). The Peace Society (founded in 1816) used the hall to hold their twentieth anniversary meeting on 25 May 1836. The meetings of the Anti-Slavery Society (founded in 1823) took place there, and such was the significance of these political meetings that the phrase "Exeter Hall" became a metonym for the abolitionist lobby.

Significant events there included a huge seven-hour public meeting hosted by the South Australia Company on 30 June 1834 to support the establishment of the free colony of South Australia. On 10 May 1871, "a meeting in support of the foreign missions of the Free Church of Scotland, and of the Presbyterian Church of England" was hosted in Exeter Hall. The former Lieutenant Governor of Punjab in British India, Donald Friell McLeod, presided over the meeting, which featured speakers such as Rev. H. L. Mackenzie, of the Swatow Mission in China (now transliterated Shantou).

In addition to its primary function as a meeting place, Exeter Hall was also the headquarters of the YMCA (founded in 1844), a concert hall for the Sacred Harmonic Society in 1834, and the venue from 1848 to 1850 of the Wednesday Concerts. Hector Berlioz first conducted concerts there in 1852, and again in 1855.

Exeter Hall was sold by the YMCA to the J. Lyons & Co. group, which assumed ownership on 27 July 1907. Lyons demolished it and built the Strand Palace Hotel in its place, opening in September 1909.

== A contemporary description ==
The following is from 1838:

[The Freemasons Hall] is capable of containing 1600 persons, but as such accommodation was even then very insufficient for the numbers who wished to attend the meetings, ladies were excluded from those of the Bible Society; and at the Church Missionary, and other popular anniversaries, the crowd was overwhelming. This was peculiarly inconvenient to the Chairman and speakers; for as the room was always filled long before the time for opening the proceedings, and there is no entrance to the platform but through the body of the hall, the difficulty of reaching the chair, and the speakers' seats, was extreme.

It was therefore determined, about the year 1828-9, by some influential persons, to enter into a scheme for building an immense edifice, which should contain a room large enough to hold any meeting, however numerous, with a smaller hall for lesser audiences, and a variety of committee rooms and offices, to be occupied by several societies, then crowded into the house. No. 32, Sackville Street, Piccadilly, and in other private buildings.

The site of Exeter Change, in the Strand, was selected, as central and convenient, and the fabric, known as Exeter Hall, was completed in 1831.

It is a large building, but from its very narrow frontage towards the Strand, is likely, at first sight, to disappoint those who come to London with their ideas of its exterior formed from what they have heard of its interior dimensions. It has scarcely any visible front, excepting a lofty entrance, between two handsome Corinthian pillars; so that many persons, who have intended to visit it, have passed by its entrance without perceiving that any public building was near them. At those hours when any large meeting is assembling or dispersing, few can mistake Exeter Hall; the living tide, which then pours in or out of its doors, is generally such as to impede the free passage of the Strand on that side; and the line of carriages, which extends far along the street in front, and up to the side entrance, is equally striking, when any great assembly is expected to break up.

The grand doorway, in the Strand, leads into a wide interior space, from whence ascend two curved flights of stairs, one on each side, which meet in one broad straight flight above, leading to the great hall, and under the junction of which opens a spacious passage. This joins, at right angles, the passage from the side entrance, so that the ground plan of these passages resembles a capital T, with rooms opening on each side of the upper line.

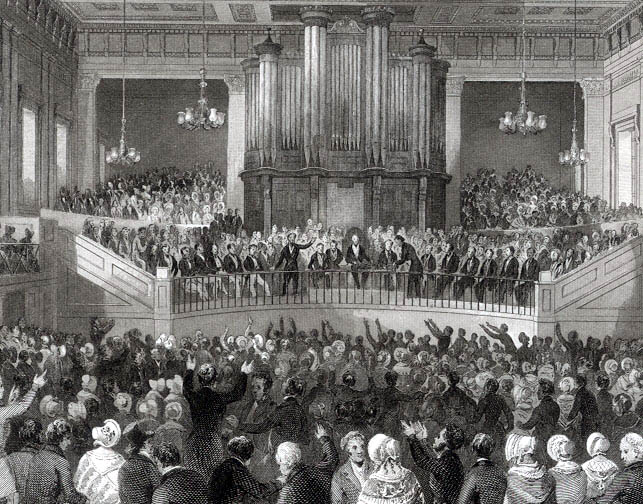
Meeting of the Royal Humane Society in the Great Hall of Exeter Hall in the 1840s.

On the lower floor are the smaller hall, (a room said to be capable of containing 1000 persons, the gallery included,) the offices of the Reformation Society, that of the Protestant Association, &c., with a room now called the Directors' Room, in which those committees, whose offices are in distant parts of London, assemble to proceed to the hall, when they hold their public meetings there. The back-stairs, leading to the raised seats, galleries, and platform of the larger hall, and also round the gallery leading to the first floor offices, are situated behind the rooms Nos. 8 and 9, occupied by the Reformation Society.

The large room of Exeter Hall was built to contain 4000 persons, with a splendid range of raised seats, to the left of the main entrance, a spacious area in front of it, and a platform, which of itself will accommodate 500 persons, to the right. At the back of the platform were formerly two sunk galleries, like the side-boxes of a theatre, which were opened or closed at pleasure, by means of moveable planks, which may be put aside during the progress of a meeting. They are now thrown completely open. The platform itself is elevated about six feet above the floor of the area, or central seats, and is finished in front by a handsome iron rail; the large and ornamental bars of which, placed about one foot from each other, are connected at top by a thick mahogany spar. In the centre of its front row stands the chair, which in form much resembles that of King Edward the Confessor, in Westminster Abbey. It is of handsomely carved mahogany, with massy open elbows, and is cushioned, in the seat and back, with purple leather. Its dimensions are very large, and any gentleman of small, or even of moderate size, who may preside, can never be said to fill it. Very few chairmen appear to advantage there; some seem lost in it, others, at a loss how to occupy it, and where to sit in it, whether backwards or forwards, upright or lounging, to the right or to the left. Those who have seen it tenanted by Lord Winchelsea, will agree that few sit there with greater dignity, or appear more advantageously to themselves.

To the right and left are common mahogany chairs for the speakers, and behind these are rows of high-backed benches, rising gradually above each other, and intersected by two flights of steps, which extend from the front row up to the entrances at the back. At upper corners are covered staircases, communicating with these entrances, the tops of which formerly joined the sunk galleries, and were often occupied by rows of ladies, more adventurous or less punctual than the rest. The platform is nominally appropriated to gentlemen, but the more curious sex seldom fail to get admittance there, in limited (or sometimes in large) numbers.

This original plan of Exeter Hall was, however, found insufficient to accommodate the overflowing audiences who crowded thither; and in 1834-5, a large and heavy gallery was erected at the back of the raised seats, supported by the four massive pillars which stand near the mouths of the upper stairs. In 1836-7, the front comers of the platform were extended forwards, into galleries, reaching half way down the area, along the walls; that to the left of the Chair is merely a continuation of the platform itself, but that to the right is railed off for lady-friends of the Presidents and Committee, and is entered by a small back stair.

With all this enlargement, however, the Hall is still insufficient for the crowds who often flock thither, as is well known by the audiences of the various Missionary and some other societies. When the room is quite filled, the finest view of it is from the deep recesses behind the platform. The scene visible from thence is truly magnificent. Below you lies the platform, slanting downwards, and extending into a crescent shape, with its crowds, sitting or standing; beyond them is the large flat surface of the area, its close benches all filled, and the avenues among them occupied by chairs, or by persons who are fain to stand, for want of sitting-room. Behind this are the raised seats, gradually appearing one behind another, and equal to half the size of the whole room; all again fully crowded, and the descending steps among the benches filled by the standing multitude. Over their heads, the whole scene is crowned by the back gallery, at a height of many feet, behind the crimson draperies which extend among the pillars, and this is completely full also. Those who wish to realize the saying of "a sea of heads", should take this view of Exeter Hall, on some popular occasion. When such an assembly rises, for prayer or praise, at the beginning or end of a meeting, the sight is still more stupendous; and the degree of sound they are able to produce, in the way of cheering or singing, is almost incredible. There have been occasions when that vast room has rung with the voices of those assembled within its walls; and a second peal of cheers succeeding, before the echoes of the first have died away, the noise altogether has been of a nature that few persons could bear unmoved.

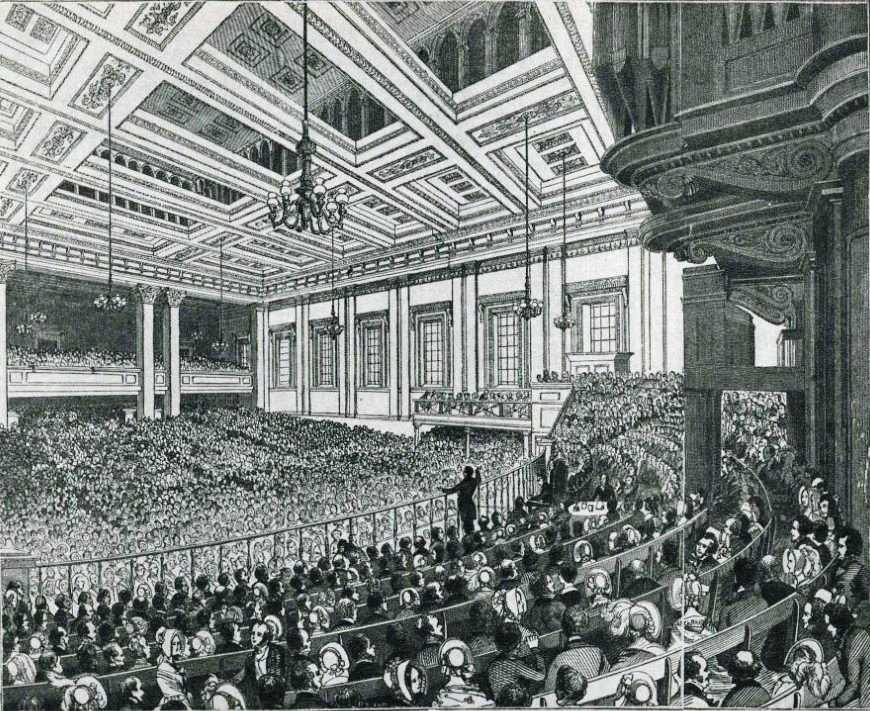
Meeting of the Anti-Corn Law League in Exeter Hall in 1846.

The Hall is lighted by a range of large square-cornered windows along its left side, at a height of fourteen or fifteen feet from the ground, and also by sliding windows in the top, which serve besides as ventilators. The roof is very lofty and handsomely ornamented, and in the centre is a large square elevation, around which are placed the ventilating windows, which open or shut from the leads outside.

The Lower Hall has no such advantage, and is ventilated by the ordinary windows, placed on each side of the room; one range opening into the back street, and the other into the main cross-passage of the building. It is similar to the larger Hall, excepting that it has no raised seats; and the gallery, platform, &c., are all on a smaller scale, suited to the size of the apartment.

A gallery extends round that part of the first floor which is not occupied by the Upper Hall, from which open the offices of the Jews (A reference to the London Society for Promoting Christianity Amongst the Jews, a Jewish Christian missionary society now known as the Church's Ministry Among Jewish People or CMJ), District Visiting, Hibernian, European Missionary, and other societies. Stairs from thence lead to the gallery of the lesser Hall, the raised seats of the large Hall, to its side-doors, (beneath the platform), to the platform itself, and to the sunk galleries.

These numerous staircases and passages render the back part of the building somewhat intricate; and strangers are constantly losing their way among them. When any large meeting is held, door-keepers, policemen, and other persons are stationed at the various stairs, to receive the tickets, and direct the company to their different destinations.

Notwithstanding this, confusion often arises when, both Halls are occupied at once, which is constantly the case during the early part of May. Another inconvenience attending such occasions is, that the plaudits of the upper and larger audience frequently drown the voices of those who are addressing the smaller one below; as they are situated immediately under the right side of the large Hall. Should the applause over-head not be very loud, it seems to arise from the lower Room, and many an inexperienced speaker has paused for his hearers to cease their cheers, when in reality the noise came from above, and had no reference to him whatever, but was addressed to some orator up stairs, perhaps expressing opinions diametrically opposed to his own…
