= Elizabeth Rainforth =

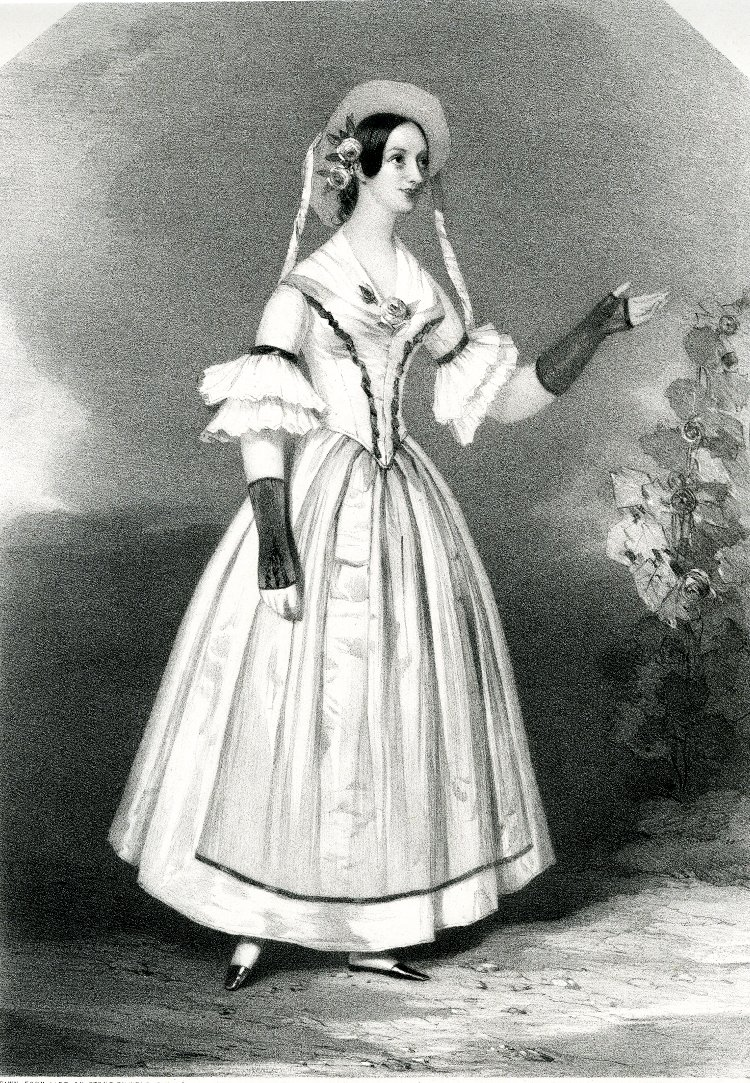
- Rainforth in Bickerstaffe and Arne's Love in a Village in 1838

Background information
- Born: November 1814
- Died: 1877 (aged 62–63) Redland, Bristol, England
- Genres: Opera
- Occupations: Soprano, singer, music arranger
- Years active: 1836–1859

Elizabeth Rainforth (1814–1877), was a British soprano opera and concert singer, and music arranger of the 19th century.

== Biography ==
Elizabeth Rainforth was born in November 1814. She was the daughter of Sampson Rainforth, a custom-house officer, and she became a pupil of Tom Cooke, Domenico Crivelli, and George Perry, and subsequently, for dramatic action, of Mrs. Davison.

She first sang in public at the vocal concerts, 29 February 1836, when she sang an aria from Der Freischütz. Her success was so pronounced as to lead to an immediate engagement for the succeeding concert in March. On 27 October in the same year Miss Rainforth made her stage début as Mandane in Thomas Arne's Artaxerxes at the St James's Theatre, and for many seasons she was a popular dramatic singer at this theatre, the English Opera House, Covent Garden, and Drury Lane. At the same time her services as a concert-singer were in great demand. In 1837 she appeared in oratorio under the auspices of the Sacred Harmonic Society and in 1838 she was pictured in Bickerstaffe and Arne's Love in a Village in 1838. On 18 March 1839 she sang at the Philharmonic concerts; and in 1840 at the Concerts of Ancient Music. In 1836 and 1842 she was a principal singer at the Norwich Festival. In 1843 and 1845 her success at the Birmingham Festival and at the Worcester festival was no less emphatic; in 1844 she was performing in Dublin. On 27 November 1843 she created the role of Arline in Balfe's The Bohemian Girl.

Rainforth appears to have been responsible for introducing the public to Lady Nairn's Jacobite song, The Hundred Pipers, some five or more years after that lady's death. Rainforth lived in Edinburgh from 1851 or 1852 to 1856, and contemporary publications post reviews of her performance of the song in the capital; and she published the song with her own (and the now standard) musical arrangement in 1852.

She retired from public life in 1859, and until 1871 she taught singing at Windsor. In 1871 she withdrew to Chatterton Villa, Redland, Bristol, where she died 22 September 1877.

== Critical appraisal ==
According to the Dictionary of National Biography, Rainforth was an admirable singer, but lacked sufficient power to place her in the foremost rank of great sopranos.
