= List of music students by teacher: K to M =

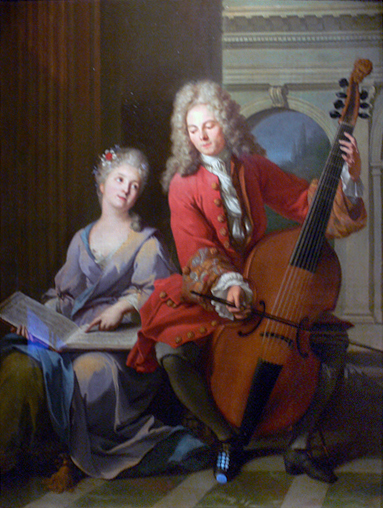
Jean-Marc Nattier, The Music Lesson (1710)

This is part of a list of students of music, organized by teacher.

== K ==
=== Dmitry Kabalevsky ===
this teacher's teachers
Kabalevsky (1904–1987) studied with teachers including Georgy Catoire, Nikolai Myaskovsky, and Alexander Goldenweiser.
- Sergey Balasanian [pupils]
- Myroslav Skoryk [pupils]

=== Mauricio Kagel ===
this teacher's teachers
Kagel (1931–2008) studied with teachers including Vincenzo Scaramuzza.
- Maria de Alvear
- Gerald Barry
- Carola Bauckholt
- Moya Henderson
- David Sawer
- Juan María Solare
- Aurel Stroe
- Kevin Volans

=== Robert Kahn ===
this teacher's teachers
Kahn (1865–1951) studied with teachers including Vinzenz Lachner and Josef Rheinberger.
- Theodore Holland [pupils]
- Wilhelm Kempff
- Ferdinand Leitner
- Günter Raphael
- Arthur Rubinstein
- Nikos Skalkottas
- Adam Sołtys [pupils]

=== Jouni Kaipainen ===
- Minna Leinonen
- Tomi Räisänen

=== Friedrich Kalkbrenner ===
this teacher's teachers
Kalkbrenner studied with teachers including Louis Adam and Charles-Simon Catel.
- Anton Gerke [pupils]
- Joseph O'Kelly
- George Alexander Osborne
- Marie Pleyel
- Ludwig Schuncke
- Camille-Marie Stamaty [pupils]

=== Ernst Kanitz ===
this teacher's teachers
Kanitz (1894–1978) studied with teachers including Richard Heuberger and Franz Schreker.
- Benjamin Lees
- Houston Bright
- Paul Cooper
- Leon Dallin
- Howard L. Quilling
- Don B. Ray
- Karl Schiske [pupils]
- Williametta Spencer

=== Hedwig Kanner-Rosenthal ===
this teacher's teachers
Kanner-Rosenthal (1882–1959) studied with teachers including Theodor Leschetizky and Moriz Rosenthal.
- Erich Leinsdorf

=== Benjamin Kaplan ===
this teacher's teachers
Kaplan (1929-2012) studied with teachers including Franz Reizenstein and Louis Kentner.
- Kit Armstrong
- Nick van Bloss
- Daniel Blumenthal
- Lisa Moore
- Noriko Ogawa

=== Artur Kapp ===
this teacher's teachers
Kapp (1878–1952) studied with teachers including Louis Homilius and Nikolai Rimsky-Korsakov.
- Helen Tobias-Duesberg
- Tuudur Vettik

=== M. William Karlins ===
this teacher's teachers
Karlins studied with teachers including Philip Bezanson, Vittorio Giannini, and Stefan Wolpe.
- David Gaines
- Maggi Payne [pupils]
- Augusta Read Thomas

=== Richard Karpen ===
- Linda Antas

=== Peter Katin ===
this teacher's teachers
Katin (1930–2015) studied with teachers including Harold Craxton.
- Steven Worbey

=== Leokadiya Kashperova ===
- Igor Stravinsky [pupils]

=== Eli Kassner ===
- Liona Boyd
- Annabelle Chvostek
- Jesse Cook
- Atom Egoyan
- Sean Kelly
- Norbert Kraft
- Gordon O'Brien
- Pavlo Simtikidis

=== Alexander Kastalsky ===
this teacher's teachers
Kastalsky (1856–1926) studied with teachers including Nikolai Gubert, Sergei Taneyev, and Pyotr Ilyich Tchaikovsky.
- Pavel Chesnokov
- Nikolai Golovanov [pupils]

=== Jean-Georges Kastner ===
this teacher's teachers
Kastner (1810–1867) studied with teachers including Henri-Montan Berton and Anton Reicha.
- Léonie Kastner-Boursault
- Frédéric Louis Ritter [pupils]

=== Apolinary Kątski ===
- Stanisław Barcewicz [pupils]
- Konstanty Gorski [pupils]
- Zygmunt Noskowski [pupils]

=== Nikolai Kazanli ===
this teacher's teachers
Kazanli studied with teachers including Nikolai Rimsky-Korsakov.
- Nikolai Myaskovsky [pupils]

=== Donald Keats ===
this teacher's teachers
Keats studied with teachers including Paul Hindemith, Dominick Argento, Henry Cowell, Paul Fetler, Otto Luening, and Quincy Porter.
- Steven Gates
- David (Carl) Johnson
- Conrad Kehn

=== Milko Kelemen ===
this teacher's teachers
Kelemen studied with teachers including Wolfgang Fortner and Karlheinz Stockhausen.
- Susanne Erding-Swiridoff
- Adriana Hölszky

=== Reginald Kell ===
- Harrison Birtwistle [pupils]
- Benny Goodman
- Alan Hacker
- Peanuts Hucko

=== Ian Kellam ===
this teacher's teachers
Kellam (1933–2014) studied with teachers including Reginald Tustin Baker, Howard Ferguson, and Herbert Sumsion.
- Roger Marsh [pupils]

=== Homer Keller ===
this teacher's teachers
Keller studied with teachers including Howard Hanson.

University of Michigan

- Leslie Bassett [pupils]
- Donald Harris
- George Balch Wilson

University of Oregon

- Raymond Barker
- Ricky L. Callier
- Jim Cockey
- Lawrence Crawford
- Burt Levy
- David W. Maves
- Stephen Scott
- Robert Scott Thompson
- Ralph Towner

=== Edgar Stillman Kelley ===
- Frederick Ayres
- Joseph W. Clokey
- James G. Heller
- Theodore Holland
- Rupert Hughes
- W. Otto Miessner
- Wallingford Riegger

=== Johann Peter Kellner ===
this teacher's teachers
Kellner studied with teachers including Johann Sebastian Bach.
- Johann Mattheson
- Johann Ernst Rembt

=== Wilhelm Kempff ===
this teacher's teachers
Karl Heinrich studied with teachers including Barth Robert and Kahn (composer) .
- İdil Biret
- Jörg Demus
- John Lill [pupils]
- Peter Schmalfuss
- Norman Shetler
- Mitsuko Uchida
- Ventsislav Yankov

=== Anne Gamble Kennedy ===
- Jacqueline Cogdell DjeDje
- Portia Shuler Hawkins

=== Matthew Kennedy ===
- Rahn Coleman
- Carol Stone Gafford
- Carol Elligan Martin
- Jon Nichimyoun Taylor

=== Louis Kentner ===
- Rachel Cavalho
- Leigh Gerdine
- Rhondda Gillespie
- Benjamin Kaplan [pupils]
- Iris Loveridge
- Marguerite Wolff
- Mary Wu

=== Johann Caspar Kerll ===
this teacher's teachers
Kellner (1627–1693) studied with teachers including Girolamo Frescobaldi and Giovanni Valentini.
- Agostino Steffani [pupils]

=== Patricia Kern ===
this teacher's teachers
Kern (1927–2015) studied with teachers including Gwynn Parry Jones.
- Kimberly Barber
- Russell Braun
- Brett Polegato
- James Westman

=== Aaron Jay Kernis ===
this teacher's teachers
Kernis studied with teachers including Jacob Druckman.
- Robert Paterson

=== Willem Kes ===
this teacher's teachers
Kes (1856–1934 studied with teachers including Ferdinand Böhme, Louis Brassin, Ferdinand David, Joseph Joachim, Friedrich Kiel, Carl Reinecke, Wilhelm Taubert, Theodorus Thijssens, Henryk Wieniawski, and Friedrich Wilhelm.
- Kato van der Hoeven
- Felice Togni [pupils]

=== Aram Khachaturian ===
this teacher's teachers
Khachaturian studied with teachers including Reinhold Glière and Nikolai Myaskovsky.
- Aziz El-Shawan
- Andrei Eshpai
- Vyacheslav Grokhovsky
- Mark Minkov
- Georgs Pelēcis
- Alexey Rybnikov
- Tolib Shakhidi
- Mikael Tariverdiev
- Enrique Ubieta
- Anatol Vieru

=== Abdul Wahid Khan ===
- Begum Akhtar
- Hirabai Badodekar
- Sureshbabu Mane
- Ram Narayan
- Pran Nath [pupils]
- Mohammed Rafi

=== Allauddin Khan ===
- Nikhil Banerjee [pupils]
- Timir Baran
- Jotin Bhattacharya
- Annapurna Devi
- Pannalal Ghosh
- Rabin Ghosh
- Aashish Khan
- Ali Akbar Khan [pupils]
- Bahadur Khan
- Vasant Rai
- Sharan Rani Backliwal
- Ravi Shankar [pupils]
- Baijnath Singh

=== Ali Akbar Khan ===
this teacher's teachers
Khan (1922–2009) studied with teachers including Allauddin Khan.
- Sharan Rani Backliwal
- John Bergamo
- Krishna Bhatt
- Tommy Graham
- Brij Bhushan Kabra
- Ranjit Makkuni
- Richard Marriott
- Sheema Mukherjee
- Silvia Nakkach
- Brij Narayan
- Arthur Russell
- Ravi Shankar [pupils]
- Jody Stecher
- Derek Trucks
- Jai Uttal
- Peter Walker

=== Imdad Khan ===
- Vilayat Khan
- Wahid Khan

=== Yuri Kholopov ===
this teacher's teachers
Kholopov studied with teachers including Semyon Bogatyrev and Philip Herschkowitz.
- Elena Firsova

=== Tikhon Khrennikov ===
this teacher's teachers
Khrennikov studied with teachers including Vissarion Shebalin and Nikolai Myaskovsky.
- Tatyana Chudova [pupils]
- Andrey Kasparov
- Alexander Tchaikovsky [pupils]

=== Friedrich Kiel ===
this teacher's teachers
Kiel (1821–1885) studied with teachers including Siegfried Dehn and Kasper Krummer.
- Waldemar von Baußnern
- Julius Buths
- Frederic Hymen Cowen
- Willem Kes [pupils]
- Carl Lachmund
- Rikard Nordraak
- Zygmunt Noskowski [pupils]
- Ignacy Jan Paderewski [pupils]
- Georg Riemenschneider
- Martin Röder
- Emil Sjögren
- Arthur Somervell
- Charles Villiers Stanford [pupils]
- Bernhard Stavenhagen [pupils]
- Ernst Eduard Taubert
- Otto Wangemann

=== Earl Kim ===
this teacher's teachers
Kim (1920–1998) studied with teachers including Arnold Schoenberg and Roger Sessions.
- John Adams
- William Banchs
- Anthony Brandt [pupils]
- Harrison Birtwistle [pupils]
- Curt Cacioppo
- Shih-Hui Chen [pupils]
- Peter Maxwell Davies [pupils]
- Doug Davis [pupils]
- David Del Tredici [pupils]
- Edwin Dugger
- George Edwards [pupils]
- Jay Gottlieb [pupils]
- Janice Hamer
- John Harbison [pupils]
- John Heiss [pupils]
- Louis Karchin [pupils]
- Robert Kyr
- Paul Lansky [pupils]
- Nicola LeFanu [pupils]
- Leonard J. Lehrman [pupils]
- Fred Lerdahl [pupils]
- David Lewin [pupils]
- Douglas McGilvra [pupils]
- Coleridge-Taylor Perkinson
- Amy Reich [pupils]
- Paul Salerni
- Kurt Stallmann
- Richard St. Clair
- Donald Sur
- Jan Swafford
- John Thow
- Richard Aaker Trythall
- Peter K. Winkler
- Randall Woolf

=== Florence Kimball ===
this teacher's teachers
Kimball (1888–1977) studied with teachers including Sarah Robinson‐Duff, Marcella Sembrich, and Arthur Shepherd.
- Annamary Dickey
- Jean Madeira
- Joyce Mathis
- Leontyne Price
- Regina Sarfaty

=== Yasuji Kiyose ===
- Toru Takemitsu [pupils]

=== William Kincaid ===
this teacher's teachers
Kincaid (1895–1967) studied with teachers including Georges Barrère.
- Julius Baker
- Frances Blaisdell
- Paul Boyer [pupils]
- Paul Lustig Dunkel
- Doriot Anthony Dwyer
- Katherine Hoover
- Claire Polin
- Elaine Shaffer
- Felix Skowronek
- John Solum
- Mark Thomas
- Albert Tipton
- Charles Wyatt

=== Johann Erasmus Kindermann ===
- Johann Friedrich Agricola
- Augustin Pfleger
- Heinrich Schwemmer [pupils]
- Georg Caspar Wecker [pupils]

=== Leon Kirchner ===
this teacher's teachers
Kirchner studied with teachers including Arnold Schoenberg and Roger Sessions.
- John Adams
- Jack Behrens
- David Borden
- Curt Cacioppo
- Alan Gilbert
- Jay Gottlieb [pupils]
- Juliana Hall
- Stephen Jablonsky [pupils]
- Tõnu Kalam
- Jonathan Kramer [pupils]
- Leonard J. Lehrman [pupils]
- Lawrence Moss
- Allen Shawn
- Faye-Ellen Silverman
- Richard St. Clair
- Tison Street
- Russell Steinberg
- Morton Subotnick [pupils]
- Serge Tcherepnin [pupils]
- Richard Wernick [pupils]

=== Dumitru Georgescu Kiriac ===
this teacher's teachers
Kiriac (1866–1928) studied with teachers including Vincent d'Indy, Gabriel Fauré, and Charles-Marie Widor.
- Mihail Andricu [pupils]
- Ion Nonna Otescu

=== Johann Kirnberger ===
this teacher's teachers
Kirnberger (1721–1783) studied with teachers including Johann Sebastian Bach.
- Johann August Just
- Karl Joseph Rodewald
- Johann Abraham Peter Schulz [pupils]
- Christian Friedrich Gottlieb Schwenke [pupils]
- Johann Gottfried Vierling [pupils]
- Johann Friedrich Wilhelm Wenckel
- Carl Friedrich Zelter [pupils]

=== Charles Herbert Kitson ===
this teacher's teachers
Kitson (1874–1944) studied with teachers including John Naylor and Charles Wood.
- Cyril Stanley Christopher
- Arthur Duff [pupils]
- Arwel Hughes [pupils]
- John F. Larchet [pupils]
- Herbert Sanders [pupils]
- Robert Still [pupils]
- Michael Tippett [pupils]
- S. Drummond Wolff [pupils]

=== Johann Christian Kittel ===
this teacher's teachers
Kittel (1732–1809) studied with teachers including Jakob Adlung and Johann Sebastian Bach.
- Michael Gotthard Fischer [pupils]
- Johann Wilhelm Hässler
- Christian Heinrich Rinck [pupils]

=== Johann Friedrich Kittl ===
this teacher's teachers
Kittl (1806–1868) studied with teachers including Václav Tomášek.
- Vilém Blodek
- Eduard Nápravník [pupils]
- Karel Šebor
- Hans Sitt [pupils]

=== Halfdan Kjerulf ===
- Agathe Backer-Grøndahl [pupils]

=== Bernhard Klein ===
Klein (1793–1832), mostly self-taught

- Siegfried Dehn [pupils]
- Otto Nicolai
- Johann Julius Schneider
- Wilhelm Taubert
- Friedrich Hieronymus Truhn
- Johannes Verhulst
- Carl Friedrich Weitzmann [pupils]
- Ernst Adolf Wendt

=== Bruno Klein ===
this teacher's teachers
Klein (1858–1911) studied with teachers including Carl Baermann, Josef Rheinberger, and Franz Wüllner.
- Paul Ambrose
- Alfred Remy

=== Jakob Friedrich Kleinknecht ===
- Christian Ludwig Kleinknecht

=== Julius Klengel ===
- Alexandre Barjansky
- Emanuel Feuermann
- Beatrice Huntingdon
- Edmund Kurtz
- Gregor Piatigorsky
- William Pleeth [pupils]
- Leopold Suchsland [pupils]
- Guilhermina Suggia

=== Jose Kliass ===
this teacher's teachers
Jose Kliass studied with teachers including Martin Krause.
- Yara Bernette [pupils]
- Ney Salgado [pupils]

=== Karl Klindworth ===
this teacher's teachers
Klindworth (1830–1916) studied with teachers including Franz Liszt.
- Georgy Catoire [pupils]
- Otto Urbach

=== Friedrich Klose ===
this teacher's teachers
Klose (1862–1942) studied with teachers including Anton Bruckner.
- Paul Ben-Haim [pupils]

=== Hyacinthe Klosé ===
- Augusta Holmès [pupils]

=== Franz Kneisel ===
- Joseph Fuchs [pupils]
- Lillian Fuchs
- Joan Field

=== Editha Knocker ===
this teacher's teachers
Knocker (1869–1950) studied with teachers including Joseph Joachim.
- Sybil Eaton

=== Iwan Knorr ===
this teacher's teachers
Knorr (1853–1916) studied with teachers including Ignaz Moscheles, Robert Papperitz, Ernst Richter, and Carl Reinecke.
- Ernest Bloch [pupils]
- H. Balfour Gardiner
- Percy Grainger [pupils]
- Frederick Septimus Kelly
- Hans Pfitzner [pupils]
- Roger Quilter
- Cyril Scott
- Ernst Toch [pupils]
- Hermann Hans Wetzler [pupils]
- Hermann Adolf Wollenhaupt

=== Oliver Knussen ===
this teacher's teachers
Knussen (1952–2018) studied with teachers including John Lambert and Gunther Schuller.
- Mark-Anthony Turnage [pupils]

=== Friedrich Koch ===
this teacher's teachers
Koch (1862–1927) studied with teachers including Woldemar Bargiel and Robert Hausmann.
- Boris Blacher [pupils]
- Paul Kletzki
- Pablo Sorozábal
- Kurt Weill
- Hermann Winkelmann

=== Zoltán Kodály ===
this teacher's teachers
Kodály studied with teachers including Hans von Koessler.
- Eddy Brown
- Antal Doráti
- Ferenc Fricsay
- Laszlo Halasz [pupils]
- Pál Kadosa
- Lili Kraus
- Anne Lauber
- Ödön Pártos
- Alexander Raichev
- György Sándor [pupils]
- Mátyás Seiber [pupils]
- Rezső Sugár
- Ferenc Szabó
- John Verrall [pupils]
- Celia Torrá

=== Charles Koechlin ===
this teacher's teachers
Koechlin (1867–1950) studied with teachers including Louis-Albert Bourgault-Ducoudray, Gabriel Fauré, André Gedalge, Charles Lefebvre, Jules Massenet, and Antoine Taudou.
- Claude Champagne [pupils]
- Roger Désormière [pupils]
- Francis Poulenc [pupils]
- Achim Stoia

=== Hans-Joachim Koellreutter ===
- Jayme Amatnecks
- Camargo Guarnieri
- Antonio Carlos Jobim
- Arthur Kampela [pupils]
- Denis Mandarino
- Gilberto Mendes
- Cláudio Santoro [pupils]
- Heitor Villa-Lobos

=== Gottfried Michael Koenig ===
- Jorge Antunes (composer)
- Mario Bertoncini
- Konrad Boehmer
- Karl Gottfried Brunotte
- Miguel Ángel Coria
- Will Eisma
- Johannes Fritsch
- Annea Lockwood
- Tomás Marco
- Pierre Mariétan
- Zoltán Pongrácz
- Kees van Prooijen
- Atli Heimir Sveinsson
- Claude Vivier
- Jan Vriend

=== Hans von Koessler ===
this teacher's teachers
Koessler (1853–1926) studied with teachers including Josef Rheinberger and Franz Wüllner.
- Béla Bartók [pupils]
- Ernst von Dohnányi [pupils]
- Victor Jacobi
- Emmerich Kálmán
- Zoltán Kodály [pupils]
- Rezső Kókai
- Albert Siklós [pupils]
- Albert Szirmai
- Leó Weiner [pupils]

=== Masayuki Koga ===
- Richard Marriott

=== Louis Köhler ===
this teacher's teachers
Köhler (1820–1886) studied with teachers including Carl Maria von Bocklet, Simon Sechter, and Ignaz von Seyfried.
- Hermann Goetz
- Adolf Jensen
- Max Spicker

=== Karl Kohn ===
this teacher's teachers
Kohn (1926–2024) studied with teachers including Irving Fine, Walter Piston, and Randall Thompson.
- Susan Morton Blaustein
- Douglas Leedy [pupils]
- David Noon
- Nancy Raabe

=== Ridley Kohné ===
- Leopold Auer [pupils]

=== Mykola Kolessa ===
this teacher's teachers
Kolessa (1903–2006) studied with teachers including Vítězslav Novák, Otakar Ostrčil, and Pavel Dědeček.
- Myroslav Skoryk [pupils]

=== Lee Konitz ===
this teacher's teachers
Konitz (1927–...) studied with teachers including Lennie Tristano.
- Al Levitt
- Richard Tabnik

=== Aloys and Alfons Kontarsky ===
- David M Arden
- York Höller
- Johannes Kalitzke
- Steffen Schleiermacher
- Luk Vaes

Steven en Stijn Kolacny

=== Mark Kopytman ===
this teacher's teachers
Kopytman (1929–2011) studied with teachers including Roman Simovych.
- David Crumb

=== Nikolai Korndorf ===
this teacher's teachers
Korndorf (1947–2001) studied with teachers including Sergey Balasanian and Leo Ginzburg.
- Victoria Borisova-Ollas

=== Włodzimierz Kotoński ===
- Jacek Grudzien
- Jarosław Kapuściński
- Krzysztof Knittel
- Konstancja Kochaniec
- Stanislaw Krupowicz
- Hanna Kulenty
- Owen Leech
- Pawel Mykietyn
- Daria Semegen [pupils]
- Pawel Szymanski

=== Serge Koussevitzky ===
- Samuel Adler [pupils]
- Leonard Bernstein [pupils]
- Sarah Caldwell
- Irving Fine [pupils]
- Lukas Foss [pupils]

=== Simon Kovar ===
- Stan Getz
- Norman Herzberg [pupils]
- Roger Nye
- Sol Schoenbach

=== Leopold Koželuch ===
this teacher's teachers
Kozeluch (1747–1818) studied with teachers including František Xaver Dušek.
- Josepha Barbara Auernhammer
- Simon Sechter [pupils]

=== Antonín Kraft ===
- Nikolaus Kraft

=== Leo Kraft ===
this teacher's teachers
Kraft studied with teachers including Nadia Boulanger and Randall Thompson.
- Elaine Barkin
- David Feldman

=== William Kraft ===
- Gino Robair

=== Jonathan Kramer ===
this teacher's teachers
Kramer studied with teachers including John Chowning, Andrew Imbrie, Leon Kirchner, Roger Sessions, Seymour Shifrin, and Karlheinz Stockhausen.
- Robert Carl
- R. Luke DuBois
- Jason Eckardt
- David Feldman
- Dalit Warshaw

=== Clemens Krauss ===
this teacher's teachers
Krauss (1893–1954) studied with teachers including Hermann Graedener and Richard Heuberger.
- Teodoro Fuchs [pupils]
- Otmar Suitner [pupils]

=== Martin Krause ===
this teacher's teachers
Krause studied with teachers including Franz Liszt.
- Claudio Arrau [pupils]
- Edwin Fischer [pupils]
- Lisy Fischer
- Arthur Frazer
- Jose Kliass [pupils]
- Manuel Ponce
- Harry Puddicombe
- Rosita Renard
- Grete von Zieritz

=== Pavel Křížkovský ===
this teacher's teachers
Křížkovský (1820–1885) studied with teachers including Gottfried Rieger.
- Leoš Janáček [pupils]

=== Herman Krebbers ===
this teacher's teachers
Krebbers (1923–2018) studied with teachers including Oskar Back.
- Rudolf Koelman
- Szymon Krzeszowiec
- Jeanne Lamon
- Gwendolyn Masin
- André Rieu
- Peter Tanfield
- Emmy Verhey
- Frank Peter Zimmermann

=== Josef Krejčí ===
- Antonín Dvořák [pupils]
- Alfred Grünfeld
- Wilhelm Kienzl
- Hans Sitt [pupils]
- Václav Suk
- Władysław Żeleński

=== Ernst Krenek ===
this teacher's teachers
Krenek studied with teachers including Franz Schreker.
- Milton Barnes
- Lorne Betts
- Sergio Cervetti [pupils]
- Samuel Dolin
- Halim El-Dabh
- Robert Erickson [pupils]
- Beverly Grigsby
- Henry Mancini
- Richard Maxfield [pupils]
- Usko Meriläinen
- Gladys Nordenstrom
- Will Ogdon
- George Perle [pupils]
- Dieter Schnebel [pupils]
- Harold Shapero [pupils]

=== Franz Krenn ===
this teacher's teachers
Krenn (1816–1897) studied with teachers including Ignaz von Seyfried.
- Leoš Janáček [pupils]
- Mathilde Kralik
- Gustav Mahler [pupils]
- Richard Robert [pupils]
- Hans Rott
- Friedrich Spigl
- Juliusz Zarębski
- Alexander von Zemlinsky [pupils]

=== Hermann Kretzschmar ===
- Hans Mersmann [pupils]
- Walter Niemann
- Egon Petri [pupils]
- Arnold Schering

=== Leonid Kreutzer ===
this teacher's teachers
L. Kreutzer (1884–1953) studied with teachers including Alexander Glazunov, Sergei Rachmaninoff, and Anna Yesipova.
- Ernö Balogh
- Vladimir Horbowski
- Karl-Ulrich Schnabel
- Ignace Strasfogel
- Grete Sultan
- Władysław Szpilman
- Alexander Zakin

=== Rodolphe Kreutzer ===
this teacher's teachers
R. Kreutzer (1766–1831) studied with teachers including Anton Stamitz.
- Lambert Massart [pupils]
- Pietro Rovelli [pupils]
- Auguste Joseph Tolbecque

=== Jaroslav Křička ===
- Jaroslav Řídký [pupils]
- Jaromír Weinberger

=== Jean-Baptiste Krumpholz ===
- Anne-Marie Krumpholtz
- François Joseph Naderman [pupils]

=== Ivan Kryzhanovsky ===
this teacher's teachers
Kryzhanovsky studied with teachers including Nikolai Rimsky-Korsakov.
- Nikolai Myaskovsky [pupils]

=== Johann Kuhnau ===
this teacher's teachers
Kuhnau (1660–1722) studied with teachers including Vincenzo Albrici.
- Johann Friedrich Fasch [pupils]
- Christoph Graupner
- Johann David Heinichen [pupils]
- Johann Theodor Roemhildt [pupils]

=== Georg Kulenkampff ===
this teacher's teachers
Kulenkampff (1898–1948) studied with teachers including Leopold Auer and Willy Hess.
- Gerda Bülow

Antoni Szafranek

=== Gary Kulesha ===
this teacher's teachers
Kulesha studied with teachers including John Corigliano, Samuel Dolin, and John McCabe.
- Vincent Ho
- Anna Höstman
- Abigail Richardson-Schulte
- Bekah Simms
- Andrew Staniland

=== Theodor Kullak ===
this teacher's teachers
Kullak (1818–1882) studied with teachers including Albrecht Agthe, Carl Czerny, and Wilhelm Taubert.
- Agathe Backer Grøndahl [pupils]
- Otto Bendix
- Hans Bischoff
- Amy Fay [pupils]
- Alfred Grünfeld
- Heinrich Hofmann
- Alexander Ilyinsky [pupils]
- James Kwast [pupils]
- Leonard Liebling
- Moritz Moszkowski [pupils]
- Rikard Nordraak
- Kathinka Paulsen White
- Silas Gamaliel Pratt
- Julius Reubke
- Nikolai Rubinstein [pupils]
- Xaver Scharwenka [pupils]
- William Hall Sherwood
- Ilia Ilyitch Slatinn
- Constantin Sternberg [pupils]
- Karl Wehle
- Fred Werner

=== Jan Kunc ===
this teacher's teachers
Kunc (1883–1976) studied with teachers including Leoš Janáček and Vítězslav Novák.
- Pavel Haas
- Antonín Tučapský

=== Jaap Kunst ===
- Mantle Hood
- Ton de Leeuw [pupils]

=== Michael Kurek ===
- William Albright [pupils]
- Leslie Bassett
- Ross Lee Finney
- Hans Werner Henze
- Eugene Kurtz

=== Karol Kurpiński ===
- Maria Szymanowska

=== Eugene Kurtz ===
this teacher's teachers
Kurtz studied with teachers including Max Deutsch, Arthur Honegger, and Darius Milhaud.
- Roger Briggs
- John Burke
- Stephen Chatman
- Eric Ewazen
- John S. Hilliard
- Robert Morris [pupils]

=== Vilém Kurz ===
- Břetislav Bakala
- Matusja Blum
- Rudolf Firkušný [pupils]
- Stanislav Heller
- Gideon Klein
- František Maxián [pupils]
- Rafael Schächter
- Pavel Štěpán
- Ilona Štěpánová-Kurzová
- Eduard Steuermann [pupils]
- Stefania Turkewich [pupils]

=== James Kwast ===
this teacher's teachers
Kwast (1852–1927) studied with teachers including Louis Brassin, François-Auguste Gevaert, Theodor Kullak, and Carl Reinecke.
- Walter Braunfels [pupils]
- Carl Friedberg [pupils]
- Ilse Fromm-Michaels
- Percy Grainger [pupils]
- Otto Klemperer
- Frieda Kwast-Hodapp
- Ethel Leginska [pupils]
- Hans Pfitzner [pupils]
- Else Schmitz-Gohr [pupils]
- Hermann Zilcher

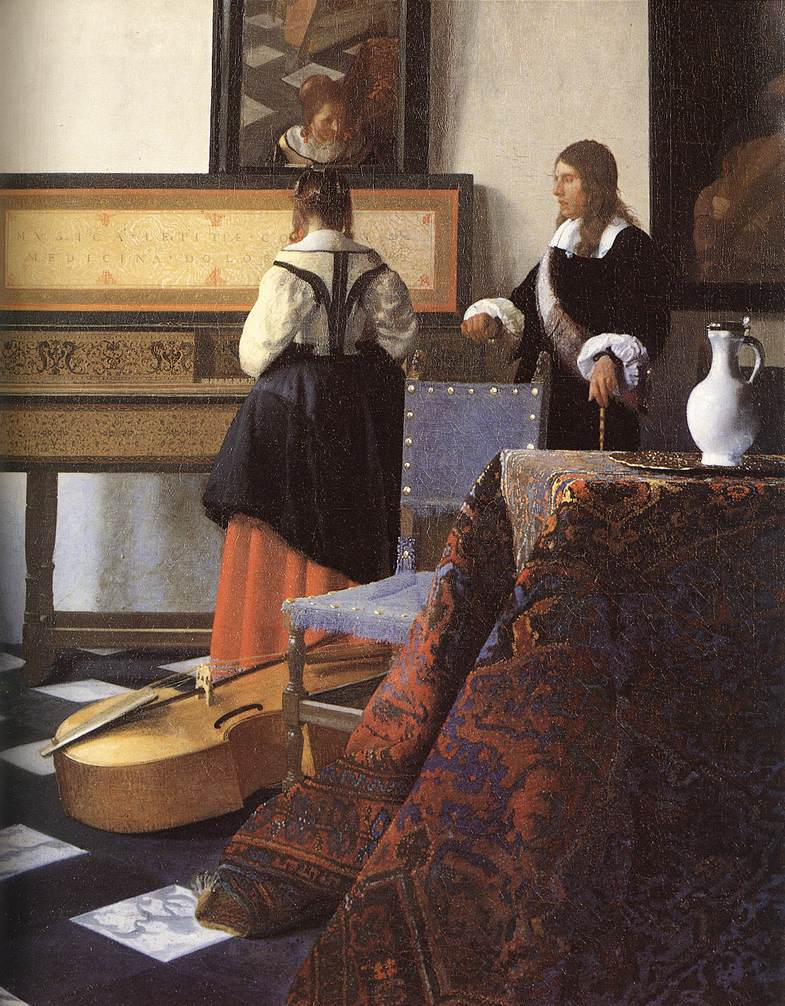

== L ==
=== Josef Labor ===
- Julius Bittner
- Franz Mittler
- Arnold Schoenberg [pupils]

=== Helmut Lachenmann ===
this teacher's teachers
Lachenmann (born 1935) studied with teachers including Johann Nepomuk David, Luigi Nono, and Karlheinz Stockhausen.
- Mark Andre
- Franck Bedrossian
- Pierluigi Billone
- Olga Bochihina
- Orm Finnendahl
- Clemens Gadenstätter
- Manuel Hidalgo
- Guoping Jia
- Elsa Justel
- Shigeru Kan-no
- Juliane Klein
- David Kosviner
- Mayako Kubo
- Harald Muenz
- Wolfram Schurig
- Stefan Streich
- José Luis Torá
- Bert Van Herck

=== Franz Lachner ===
this teacher's teachers
Lachner studied with teachers including Simon Sechter and Maximilian Stadler.
- Carl Baermann [pupils]
- Ernst Pauer [pupils]
- Josef Rheinberger [pupils]
- Julius Röntgen [pupils]
- Anton Urspruch [pupils]

=== Vinzenz Lachner ===
this teacher's teachers
Lachner (1811–1893) studied with teachers including Simon Sechter and Maximilian Stadler.
- Zdeněk Fibich [pupils]
- Robert Kahn [pupils]
- Friedrich Klose [pupils]
- Max von Pauer
- Fritz Steinbach [pupils]
- Gustav Weber

=== C. K. Ladzekpo ===
- Paul Dresher

=== Kobla Ladzekpo ===
- Paul Dresher

=== Charles Philippe Lafont ===
this teacher's teachers
Lafont (1781–1839) studied with teachers including Rodolphe Kreutzer and Pierre Rode.
- Victor Magnien [pupils]
- Lambert Joseph Meerts [pupils]
- François Schubert

=== Théophile Laforge ===
this teacher's teachers
Laforge (1863–1918) studied with teachers including Eugène Sauzay.
- Henri Casadesus
- Pierre Monteux [pupils]
- Maurice Vieux

=== László Lajtha ===
this teacher's teachers
Lajtha (1892–1963) studied with teachers including Victor Herzfeld, Arnold Székely, and Árpád Szendy.
- Kyla Greenbaum [pupils]

=== Pierre Lalo ===
- Arthur Berger [pupils]

=== Jacques-Michel Hurel de Lamare ===
this teacher's teachers
Lamare (1772–1823) studied with teachers including Jean-Louis Duport.
- Nicolas-Joseph Platel [pupils]

=== Alexander Lambert ===
- Jerome Kern
- Mana Zucca

=== Constant Lambert ===
this teacher's teachers
Lambert (1905–1951) studied with teachers including George Dyson, Herbert Fryer, Ralph Vaughan Williams, R. O. Morris, and Malcolm Sargent.
- Malcolm Arnold
- Rudolph Dolmetsch
- Peggy Glanville-Hicks
- Isador Goodman
- William Reed
- Lionel Salter
- Bernard Stevens [pupils]

=== John Lambert ===
this teacher's teachers
Lambert (1926–1995) studied with teachers including Nadia Boulanger.
- Javier Álvarez
- Julian Anderson [pupils]
- Simon Bainbridge [pupils]
- Gary Carpenter
- David Fanshawe
- Edward Lambert
- Oliver Knussen [pupils]
- Jonathan Lloyd
- Ian McQueen
- Carlos Miranda
- Barrington Pheloung
- Mark-Anthony Turnage [pupils]

=== Frederic Lamond ===
this teacher's teachers
Lamond studied with teachers including Franz Liszt.
- Victor Borge
- Jan Chiapusso
- Gunnar Johansen
- Ervin Nyiregyházi

=== Francesco Lamperti ===
- Emma Albani
- Gottardo Aldighieri
- Désirée Artôt [pupils]
- Sona Aslanova
- David Bispham
- Italo Campanini
- Virgilio Collini
- Sophie Cruvelli
- Franz Ferenczy
- Julián Gayarre [pupils]
- Lizzie Graham
- Friederike Grün
- Ángela Peralta
- Alberto Stagno
- Teresa Stolz
- Josef Tamaro
- Maria Waldmann
- Herbert Witherspoon
- Marie van Zandt

=== Giovanni Battista Lamperti ===
- Irene Abendroth
- David Bispham
- Franz Nachbaur
- Ernestine Schumann-Heink
- Marcella Sembrich [pupils]
- Roberto Stagno

=== Wanda Landowska ===
this teacher's teachers
Lang studied with teachers including Moritz Moszkowski.
- Putnam Aldrich [pupils]
- Clifford Curzon [pupils]
- Ralph Kirkpatrick
- Philip Manuel
- Daniel Pinkham
- Rafael Puyana
- Gavin Williamson

=== Benjamin Johnson Lang ===
this teacher's teachers
Lang studied with teachers including Adriana Hölszky and Alfred Jaëll.
- William Foster Apthorp
- Arthur Foote
- Margaret Ruthven Lang
- Ethelbert Nevin

=== Jean Langlais ===
this teacher's teachers
Langlais studied with teachers including Paul Dukas, Marcel Dupré, Noël Gallon, and André Marchal.
- Jean Barraqué
- Naji Hakim
- Marie-Louise Jacquet

=== Paul Lansky ===
this teacher's teachers
Lansky studied with teachers including Milton Babbitt, Edward T. Cone, Earl Kim, George Perle, James Tenney, and Hugo Weisgall.
- Betsey Biggs
- Nick Brooke
- Ted Coffey
- Michael Dellaira
- Emily Doolittle
- Alan Fletcher
- Brad Garton
- Nathan Michel
- Katharine Norman
- Stefan Weisman
- Miriama Young

=== Alcides Lanza ===
this teacher's teachers
Lanza studied with teachers including Julián Bautista, Aaron Copland, Alberto Ginastera, Yvonne Loriod, Bruno Maderna, Gian Francesco Malipiero, and Olivier Messiaen.
- Peter Allen
- John Burke
- Eli-Eri Moura

=== Francesco Lanza ===
this teacher's teachers
F. Lanza (1783—1862) studied with teachers including Muzio Clementi, Fedele Fenaroli, and John Field.
- Giuseppe Lillo
- Vincenzo de Meglio
- Ciro Pinsuti
- Paolo Serrao [pupils]

=== John Francis Larchet ===
this teacher's teachers
Larchet studied with teachers including Michele Esposito and Charles Herbert Kitson.
- Walter Beckett
- Seóirse Bodley
- Michael Bowles
- Brian Boydell
- T.C. Kelly
- Elizabeth Maconchy [pupils]
- Frederick May
- Havelock Nelson
- Joan Trimble
- Gerard Victory

=== Alicia de Larrocha ===
this teacher's teachers
Larrocha (1932-2009) studied with teachers including Frank Marshall.
- Carlota Garriga i Kuijpers
- Akiko Nomoto
- Alba Ventura
- Marta Zabaleta

=== Eduard Lassen ===
- Eugen von Volborth

=== Orlande de Lassus ===
- Johannes Eccard
- Andrea Gabrieli [pupils]
- Giovanni Gabrieli [pupils]

=== Jacob Lateiner ===
- Bruce Brubaker
- Jarred Dunn (last student)
- Michael Endres
- Danae Kara
- Laura Karpman
- Lowell Liebermann
- Ying Chien Lin
- Yves Rault
- Ernest So
- Robert Taub
- Li-Na Yeh

=== Gaetano Latilla ===
- Johann Gottfried Schwanberg

=== Ferdinand Laub ===
this teacher's teachers
Laud (1832–1875) studied with teachers including Simon Sechter.
- Stanisław Barcewicz [pupils]
- Adolph Brodsky

=== Thomas Laub ===
- Finn Høffding [pupils]

=== Calixa Lavallée ===
- Alexis Contant [pupils]

=== Berthe Laventurier ===
this teacher's teachers
Laventurier (1901–1978) studied with teachers including Arthur De Greef.
- Janine Reding [pupils]

=== Vincenzo Lavigna ===
this teacher's teachers
Lavigna (1776–1836) studied with teachers including Fedele Fenaroli, Giovanni Paisiello, and Saverio Valente.
- Giuseppe Verdi

=== Albert Lavignac ===
this teacher's teachers
Lavignac (1846–1916) studied with teachers including François Benoist, Antoine François Marmontel, and Ambroise Thomas.
- Henri Casadesus
- Claude Debussy [pupils]
- Vincent d'Indy [pupils]
- Jean Gallon [pupils]
- Noël Gallon [pupils]
- Reynaldo Hahn [pupils]
- Philipp Jarnach [pupils]
- Lazare Lévy [pupils]
- Henri O'Kelly
- Gabriel Pierné
- Florent Schmitt

=== Mario Lavista ===
this teacher's teachers
Lavista (1943–2021) studied with teachers including Rodolfo Halffter, Jean-Étienne Marie, and Héctor Quintanar.
- Javier Álvarez [pupils]
- Graciela Agudelo
- Gabriela Ortiz

=== Djane Lavoie-Herz ===
this teacher's teachers
Lavoie-Herz studied with teachers including Alexander Scriabin.
- Ruth Crawford Seeger
- Vivian Fine

=== Henry Lawes ===
- Lady Mary Dering

=== Henri Lazarof ===
this teacher's teachers
Lazarof (1932–2013) studied with teachers including Paul Ben-Haim.
- Edward Applebaum

=== Madé Lebah ===
- Colin McPhee
- Michael Tenzer [pupils]
- Evan Ziporyn

=== Maurice Le Boucher ===
this teacher's teachers
Le Boucher (1882–1964) studied with teachers including Gabriel Fauré.
- André David

=== Jean-Marie Leclair ===
this teacher's teachers
Leclair [the older] (1697–1764) studied with teachers including Giovanni Battista Somis.
- Joseph-Barnabé Saint-Sevin

=== Jean-Marie Leclair the younger ===
- Jean-Joseph Rodolphe

=== Jean-Pantaléon Leclerc ===
this teacher's teachers
Leclerc (1697–1760) studied with teachers including Henri Moreau and Nicolas Rennekin.
- André Grétry

=== Douglas Leedy ===
this teacher's teachers
Leedy (1938–2015) studied with teachers including Karl Kohn, K. V. Narayanaswamy, and Pandit Pran Nath.
- Peter K. Winkler

=== Ton de Leeuw ===
this teacher's teachers
Leeuw studied with teachers including Jaap Kunst and Olivier Messiaen.
- Gheorghi Arnaoudov
- Brian Ferneyhough [pupils]
- Michail Goleminov
- Mark Gustavson
- Walter Hekster
- Margriet Hoenderdos
- Guus Janssen
- Erkki Jokinen
- Tristan Keuris
- Sorin Lerescu
- Liza Lim
- Daan Manneke
- Chiel Meijering
- Serban Nichifor
- Cecilie Ore
- Otto Sidharta
- Paul Gutama Soegijo
- Víctor Varela
- Jan Vriend
- Sinta Wullur

=== Nicola LeFanu ===
this teacher's teachers
LeFanu (1947–) studied with teachers including Alexander Goehr, Earl Kim, Jeremy Dale Roberts, Peter Maxwell Davies, Thea Musgrave, Goffredo Petrassi, and Egon Wellesz.
- Sadie Harrison
- Laurence Hughes
- Dorothy Ker
- Paul Mealor
- Gráinne Mulvey
- Valerie Pearson
- Nadja Gabriela Plein

=== Yvonne Lefébure ===
this teacher's teachers
Lefébure (1898–1986) studied with teachers including Alfred Cortot and Charles-Marie Widor.
- Hélène Boschi
- Catherine Collard
- Yvonne Desportes [pupils]
- Yvo Schönfeld

=== Gustave Lefèvre ===
- Léon Boëllmann

=== Paul Le Flem ===
this teacher's teachers
Le Flem (1881–1984) studied with teachers including Vincent d'Indy and Albert Roussel.
- André Jolivet
- Colin McPhee
- Achim Stoia

=== Ethel Leginska ===
this teacher's teachers
Leginska (1886–1970) studied with teachers including James Kwast and Theodor Leschetizky.
- Dathan Dedman
- James Henry Fields
- Daniel Pollack
- Bruce Sutherland
- Gavin Williamson

=== Giovanni Legrenzi ===
this teacher's teachers
Legrenzi (1626–1690) studied with teachers including Giovanni Rovetta.
- Domenico Gabrielli [pupils]
- Antonio Lotti [pupils]
- Antonio Caldara [pupils]
- Tomaso Albinoni
- Antonio Vivaldi [pupils]

=== Jacques Leguerney ===
this teacher's teachers
Leguerney (1906–1997) studied with teachers including Nadia Boulanger and Francis Poulenc.

=== René Leibowitz ===
this teacher's teachers
Leibowitz (1913–1972) studied with teachers including Pierre Monteux, Arnold Schoenberg, and Anton Webern.
- Pierre Boulez [pupils]
- Claude Helffer
- Hans Werner Henze [pupils]
- Stanko Horvat
- Maurice Le Roux
- Janet Maguire
- Jacques-Louis Monod
- David Montgomery
- Will Ogdon
- Allan Pettersson
- Ruben Radica
- John Whitney
- Bernd Alois Zimmermann [pupils]

=== Hugo Leichtentritt ===
this teacher's teachers
Leichtentritt studied with teachers including John Knowles Paine.
- Erich Walter Sternberg

=== Kenneth Leighton ===
this teacher's teachers
Leighton (1929-1988) studied with teachers including Bernard Rose.
- Nicholas Cleobury
- Brian Blyth Daubney
- James MacMillan
- Nigel Osborne
- Donald Runnicles

=== Karl Leimer ===
- Walter Gieseking [pupils]
- Janine Reding [pupils]

=== Nestor Lejeune ===
- Marcel Mihalovici

=== Peter Mandrup Lem ===
- Frederik Thorkildsen Wexschall [pupils]

=== Edwin Lemare ===
- Ralph Kinder

=== Jacques-Nicolas Lemmens ===
this teacher's teachers
Lemmens (1823–1881) studied with teachers including François-Joseph Fétis and Adolf Friedrich Hesse.
- Alexandre Guilmant [pupils]
- Charles-Marie Widor [pupils]

=== Henry Lemoine ===
this teacher's teachers
Lemoine (1786–1854) studied with teachers including Anton Reicha.
- Renaud de Vilbac

=== Charles Lenepveu ===
- Jean Gallon [pupils]
- Noël Gallon [pupils]
- Philippe Gaubert [pupils]
- Henriette Renié

=== Lucas van Lennick ===
this teacher's teachers
van Lennick (fl. 1640s–1650s) studied with teachers including Jan Pieterszoon Sweelinck.
- Johann Adam Reincken [pupils]

=== Carl Petter Lenning ===
- Erik Tulindberg

=== Leonardo Leo ===
this teacher's teachers
Leo (1694–1744) studied with teachers including Nicola Fago and Francesco Provenzale.
- Emanuele Barbella [pupils]
- Giuseppe Bonno [pupils]
- Pasquale Cafaro
- Gennaro D'Alessandro [pupils]
- Giovanni Andrea Fioroni [pupils]
- Niccolò Jommelli [pupils]
- Antonio Rina [pupils]
- Nicola Sala [pupils]

=== Hubert Léonard ===
this teacher's teachers
Léonard studied with teachers including Charles Auguste de Bériot and François Habeneck.
- Claudio Brindis de Salas Garrido
- Alfred De Sève
- Martin Pierre Marsick [pupils]
- Henri Marteau
- Frantz Jehin-Prume
- André van Riemsdijk [pupils]
- Henry Schradieck [pupils]
- César Thomson [pupils]

=== Gustav Leonhardt ===
- Bob van Asperen
- Richard Egarr
- Pierre Hantaï
- Ketil Haugsand
- Christopher Hogwood
- Ton Koopman
- Davitt Moroney
- Jacques Ogg
- Martin Pearlman
- Frederick Renz
- Elaine Thornburgh
- Colin Tilney

=== Fred Lerdahl ===
this teacher's teachers
Lerdahl studied with teachers including Wolfgang Fortner, Roger Sessions, and Earl Kim.
- Christopher Buchenholz
- Jeffrey Ching
- Luke DuBois
- Douglas Geers
- Mark Gustavson
- Huck Hodge
- Allen Shearer
- Dalit Warshaw
- Patrick Zimmerli

=== Xavier Leroux ===
this teacher's teachers
Leroux studied with teachers including Théodore Dubois.
- Eugène Bigot
- Georges Dandelot [pupils]
- Marc Delmas
- Roger Désormière
- Louis Fourestier
- Philippe Gaubert [pupils]
- Henri Mulet
- Paul Paray
- Louis Vuillemin

=== Theodor Leschetizky ===
this teacher's teachers
Leschetizky studied with teachers including Carl Czerny and Simon Sechter.
- Alexander Brailowsky
- Walter Braunfels [pupils]
- Richard Buhlig
- Jeannette Durno
- Ignaz Friedman [pupils]
- Ossip Gabrilowitsch
- Heinrich Gebhard [pupils]
- Severin Eisenberger [pupils]
- Mark Hambourg
- Mieczysław Horszowski [pupils]
- Edwin Hughes [pupils]
- Hedwig Kanner-Rosenthal [pupils]
- Ethel Leginska [pupils]
- Frank Merrick [pupils]
- Franz Mittler
- Benno Moiseiwitsch [pupils]
- Elly Ney
- Marie Novello
- Ignacy Jan Paderewski [pupils]
- Vladimir Pukhal'ski [pupils]
- Alexander Raab [pupils]
- Vasily Safonov [pupils]
- Franz Schmidt [pupils]
- Artur Schnabel [pupils]
- Eleanor Spencer
- Isabelle Vengerova [pupils]
- Anastasia Virsaladze
- Jacob Weinberg [pupils]
- Emerson Whithorne
- Alexander Winkler [pupils]
- Paul Wittgenstein
- Anna Yesipova [pupils]
- Dalhousie Young
- Michael von Zadora

Piano assistants:

- Malwine Brée
- Katharine Goodson [pupils]
- Marie Prentner

=== Annette LeSiege ===
this teacher's teachers
LeSiege studied with teachers including Samuel Adler and Warren Benson.
- Sarah Aderholdt
- Clare Shore

=== Franciszek Lessel ===
this teacher's teachers
Lessel studied with teachers including Joseph Haydn.
- Maria Szymanowska

=== Jean-François Le Sueur ===
this teacher's teachers
Le Sueur (1760–1837) studied with teachers including Nicolas Roze.
- Hector Berlioz
- Louis Désiré Besozzi
- Ernest Boulanger
- Antoine Elwart [pupils]
- Charles Gounod [pupils]
- Antoine François Marmontel [pupils]
- Napoléon Henri Reber [pupils]
- Ambroise Thomas [pupils]

=== Hermann Levi ===
- Emil Steinbach [pupils]

=== Ray Lev ===
- Anne Gamble Kennedy

=== Heniot Levy ===
- Ruth Crawford Seeger [pupils]

=== Lazare Lévy ===
this teacher's teachers
Lévy (1882–1964) studied with teachers including Louis Diémer, André Gedalge, and Albert Lavignac.
- Henri Betti
- Roger Boss
- Storm Bull
- John Cage [pupils]
- Marcel Dupré [pupils]
- Lukas Foss [pupils]
- Koharik Gazarossian
- Valentin Gheorghiu
- Monique Haas
- Clara Haskil
- Yüksel Koptagel
- Varda Nishry
- Oskar Morawetz
- Michel Plasson
- Yves Ramette
- Georges Savaria
- Kazimierz Serocki
- Solomon
- Rodica Sutzu
- André Tchaikowsky

=== David Lewin ===
this teacher's teachers
Lewin studied with teachers including Milton Babbitt, Edward T. Cone, and Earl Kim.
- Lee Hyla [pupils]

=== Henry Ley ===
this teacher's teachers
Ley (1887–1962) studied with teachers including Marmaduke Barton, Charles Villiers Stanford, Walter Parratt, and Charles Wood.
- Thomas Armstrong [pupils]

=== Ingvar Lidholm ===
this teacher's teachers
Lidholm (born 1921) studied with teachers including Hilding Rosenberg.
- Edward Applebaum
- Anders Eliasson

=== Estelle Liebling ===
this teacher's teachers
Liebling studied with teachers including Mathilde Marchesi and Selma Nicklass-Kempner.
- Adele Astaire
- Grace Angelau
- Rosemarie Brancato
- Ralph Blane
- Kitty Carlisle
- Betty Compton
- Joan Crawford
- Yvonne D'Arle
- Colette D'Arville
- Jessica Dragonette
- Doris Duke
- Amelita Galli-Curci
- Rosario García Orellana
- Hope Hampton
- Frieda Hempel
- Maria Jeritza
- Miliza Korjus
- Gertrude Lawrence
- Max Lorenz
- Göta Ljungberg
- Dorothee Manski
- William Martin
- Irene Mayer Selznick
- Lucy Monroe
- Maria Müller
- Devora Nadworney
- Louella Parsons
- Irra Petina
- Marie Rappold
- Elisabeth Rethberg
- Joan Roberts
- Anne Roselle
- Titta Ruffo
- Vivienne Segal
- Beverly Sills
- Meryl Streep
- Alexander Sved
- Margaret Truman
- June Winters
- Iva Withers

=== Theodor Lierhammer ===
- Otto Edelmann
- Boris Christoff
- Ljuba Welitsch
- Erich Kunz

=== György Ligeti ===
- Hans Abrahamsen [pupils]
- Denys Bouliane
- Martin Bresnick [pupils]
- Xiaoyong Chen
- Unsuk Chin
- Sidney Corbett
- Michael Daugherty [pupils]
- Henrik Otto Donner
- Mohammed Fairouz
- Beatriz Ferreyra
- James Horner
- Anne LeBaron
- Jonathan Lloyd
- Peter Nelson
- Wolfgang Plagge
- Andrew Powell
- Hans Peter Reutter
- Wolfgang von Schweinitz
- Roberto Sierra [pupils]
- Sheila Silver
- Malcolm Singer
- Manfred Stahnke
- Norma Tyer
- Jeanne Zaidel-Rudolph

=== John Lill ===
this teacher's teachers
Lill (born 1944) studied with teachers including Sidney Harrison, Wilhelm Kempff, and Angus Morrison.
- Andrew Wilson-Dickson

=== Liza Lim ===
- Chikako Morishita

=== Jenny Lind ===
this teacher's teachers
Lind studied with teachers including Manuel García and Adolf Fredrik Lindblad.
- Amanda Christina Elizabeth Aldridge [pupils]
- Liza Lehmann

=== Magnus Lindberg ===
- Tom Armstrong
- Daniel Basford
- Jonathan Cole
- Francisco Coll
- Andris Dzenitis
- Sam Hayden
- Lei Liang
- Jimmy López
- Karola Obermueller
- Bert Van Herck

=== Adolf Fredrik Lindblad ===
this teacher's teachers
Lindblad studied with teachers including Johann Christian Friedrich Hæffner and Carl Friedrich Zelter.
- Jenny Lind [pupils]

=== Ludvig Mathias Lindeman ===
- Agathe Backer Grøndahl [pupils]

=== Robert Lindley ===
this teacher's teachers
Lindley (1776–1855) studied with teachers including James Cervetto.
- Charles Lucas [pupils]

=== Thomas Linley the elder ===
- Elizabeth Ann Linley
- William Linley

=== David Liptak ===
- Carter Pann [pupils]
- Robert Paterson

=== Bernhard Listemann ===
this teacher's teachers
Listemann studied with teachers including Joseph Joachim and Henri Vieuxtemps.
- Edmund Severn

=== Franz Liszt ===
this teacher's teachers
Liszt studied with teachers including Carl Czerny, Anton Reicha, and Antonio Salieri.
- Károly Aggházy [pupils]
- Eugen d'Albert
- Conrad Ansorge [pupils]
- Mikhail Azanchevsky
- Agathe Backer Grøndahl [pupils]
- Carl Baermann [pupils]
- Henri Berény
- Arthur H. Bird
- Valérie Boissier [pupils]
- Hans Bronsart von Schellendorff
- Hans von Bülow [pupils]
- Louis Coenen
- Arthur De Greef [pupils]
- Paul Ertel [pupils]
- Amy Fay [pupils]
- Arthur Friedheim [pupils]
- Olga Janina aka Bessel [pupils]
- Karl Klindworth [pupils]
- Martin Krause [pupils]
- Frederic Lamond [pupils]
- Wilhelm von Lenz
- Max Liebling
- William Mason [pupils]
- Sophie Menter
- Sebastian Bach Mills
- John Nelson Pattison
- Dionys Pruckner
- Eduard Rappoldi [pupils]
- Theodor Ratzenberger
- Lily Reiff [pupils]
- Carl Reinecke [pupils]
- Eduard Reuss
- Théodore Ritter [pupils]
- Moriz Rosenthal [pupils]
- Damian von Rössl
- Max van de Sandt
- Emil von Sauer [pupils]
- Max Schwarz
- Giovanni Sgambati [pupils]
- William Hall Sherwood
- Alexander Siloti [pupils]
- Bernhard Stavenhagen [pupils]
- Karl Tausig [pupils]
- Hilda Thegerström [pupils]
- István Thomán [pupils]
- Clara E. Thoms
- Vera Timanova
- Anton Urspruch [pupils]
- José Vianna da Motta
- Pauline Viardot
- Eugen von Volborth
- Regina Watson [pupils]
- Józef Wieniawski
- Josef Weiss
- Géza Zichy

=== Henry Litolff ===
this teacher's teachers
Litolff (1818–1891) studied with teachers including Ignaz Moscheles.
- Hans von Bülow [pupils]
- Gordon Saunders [pupils]
- Pyotr Schurovsky

=== Leo Livens ===
this teacher's teachers
Livens (1896-1990) studied with teachers including Tobias Matthay.
- William Alwyn [pupils]

=== Edward Llewellyn ===
- Emory Remington

=== Miguel Llobet ===
this teacher's teachers
Llobet studied with teachers including Francisco Tárrega.
- María Luisa Anido
- José Rey de la Torre
- Andrés Segovia

=== Charles Harford Lloyd ===
this teacher's teachers
Lloyd (1849–1919 studied with teachers including John Stainer.
- Herbert Brewer [pupils]
- Percy Buck [pupils]
- Frederick Septimus Kelly
- George Robertson Sinclair

=== William Lloyd Webber ===
this teacher's teachers
Lloyd Webber (1914–1982) studied with teachers including Ralph Vaughan Williams.
- Martin Ellerby
- Hugh Wood [pupils]

=== Normand Lockwood ===
this teacher's teachers
Lockwood studied with teachers including Nadia Boulanger and Ottorino Respighi.
- Peter Mennin [pupils]
- Louis Mennini
- George Theophilus Walker

=== Johann Bernhard Logier ===
- Ann Mounsey

=== Antonio Lolli ===
- Bartolomeo Campagnoli
- Franz Anton Ernst

=== Vincenzo Lombardi ===
- Enrico Caruso
- Thomas Hardie Chalmers
- Fernando De Lucia
- Charles Hackett
- Riccardo Martin
- Antonio Scotti

=== Kathleen Long ===
this teacher's teachers
Long (1896–1968) studied with teachers including Herbert Sharpe.
- Eiluned Davies [pupils]
- Imogen Holst [pupils]
- Peter Klatzow
- Arthur Oldham

=== Marguerite Long ===
this teacher's teachers
Long studied with teachers including Antoine François Marmontel.
- Michèle Boegner
- Lucette Descaves [pupils]
- Philippe Entremont
- Albert Ferber
- Jacques Février [pupils]
- Samson François
- Guillaume (Gui) Mombaerts
- Cemal Reşit Rey
- Denise Roger
- Georges Savaria [pupils]
- Gabriel Tacchino
- Peter Wallfisch [pupils]

=== Alessandro Longo ===
this teacher's teachers
Longo (1864–1945) studied with teachers including Beniamino Cesi and Paolo Serrao.
- Achille Longo
- José de Nito

=== Nikolai Lopatnikoff ===
- Conrad Susa

=== Richard Loqueville ===
- Guillaume Dufay

=== Yvonne Loriod ===
this teacher's teachers
Loriod (1924–2010) studied with teachers including César-Abel Estyle, Olivier Messiaen, Darius Milhaud, and Isidor Philipp.
- Alexander Abercrombie
- George Benjamin
- Peter Donohoe
- Melanie Ruth Daiken
- Jay Gottlieb
- Alcides Lanza
- Matthew Schellhorn

=== Antonio Lotti ===
this teacher's teachers
Lotti (1667-1740) studied with teachers including Giovanni Legrenzi.
- Domenico Alberti
- Francesco Antonio Calegari [pupils]
- Baldassare Galuppi
- Benedetto Marcello
- Giovanni Battista Pescetti
- Jan Dismas Zelenka [pupils]

=== Charles Lucas ===
this teacher's teachers
Lucas (1808–1869) studied with teachers including William Crotch, Robert Lindley, and John Lord.
- Joseph Barnby [pupils]
- William Sterndale Bennett [pupils]
- William Cusins [pupils]
- George Alexander Macfarren [pupils]
- Alexander Mackenzie [pupils]

=== Andrea Luchesi ===
this teacher's teachers
Luchesi (1741–1801) studied with teachers including Ferdinando Bertoni and Baldassare Galuppi.
- Anton Reicha [pupils]
- Ferdinand Ries
- Andreas Romberg
- Bernhard Romberg [pupils]

=== Alvin Lucier ===
this teacher's teachers
Lucier (born 1931) studied with teachers including Arthur Berger, Aaron Copland, Lukas Foss, Quincy Porter, and Harold Shapero.
- Miguel Álvarez-Fernández
- Nicolas Collins
- Roland Dahinden
- Arnold Dreyblatt
- Judy Dunaway
- James Fei
- Douglas Kahn
- Ron Kuivila
- Richard Lerman
- Mladen Milicevic
- Anne Wellmer
- Daniel James Wolf

=== Otto Luening ===
- Sol Berkowitz
- Wendy Carlos
- Chou Wen-chung [pupils]
- Gloria Coates [pupils]
- Dan Cooper
- John Corigliano [pupils]
- Philip Corner
- Mario Davidovsky [pupils]
- Charles Dodge
- Roger Goeb
- Malcolm Goldstein
- Daniel Goode
- John Heiss [pupils]
- Ben Johnston [pupils]
- Donald Keats [pupils]
- Karl Korte
- Leonard B. Meyer [pupils]
- Joseph Pehrson
- Eric Salzman
- Elliott Schwartz
- Alice Shields
- Seymour Shifrin [pupils]
- Faye-Ellen Silverman
- Dave Soldier
- Harvey Sollberger [pupils]
- Joan Tower [pupils]
- Michiko Toyama
- Daniel Waitzman [pupils]
- David Walther [pupils]
- Charles Wuorinen [pupils]

=== Lennart Lundberg ===
- Gunnar de Frumerie [pupils]
- Henning Mankell

=== Giovanni Lorenzo Lulier ===
- Giovanni Battista Costanzi

=== Jean-Baptiste Lully ===
- Johann Caspar Ferdinand Fischer [pupils]
- Pelham Humfrey [pupils]
- Johann Sigismund Kusser [pupils]
- Georg Muffat [pupils]

=== Radu Lupu ===
- Alba Ventura

=== Mathis Lussy ===
this teacher's teachers
Lussy (1828–1910) studied with teachers including Aloys Businger and Leopold Nägeli.
- Émile Jaques-Dalcroze [pupils]

=== Witold Lutosławski ===
this teacher's teachers
Lutosławski (1913–1994) studied with teachers including Lidia Kmitowa, Jerzy Lefeld, and Witold Maliszewski.
- Paavo Heininen
- Daria Semegen [pupils]
- Patric Standford

=== Elisabeth Lutyens ===
this teacher's teachers
Lutyens 1906–1983 studied with teachers including Harold Darke, John Foulds, and Ernest Tomlinson.
- Brian Elias [pupils]
- John Hawkins
- Robert Saxton [pupils]

=== Luzzasco Luzzaschi ===
this teacher's teachers
Luzzaschi (c. 1545 – 1607) studied with teachers including Cipriano de Rore and Francesco dalla Viola.
- Girolamo Frescobaldi [pupils]

=== Anatoly Lyadov ===
this teacher's teachers
Lyadov (1855–1914) studied with teachers including Nikolai Rimsky-Korsakov.
- Joseph Achron
- Georgy Catoire [pupils]
- Mikhail Gnessin
- Alfrēds Kalniņš
- Nikolai Malko [pupils]
- Emil Młynarski [pupils]
- Nikolai Myaskovsky [pupils]
- Sergei Prokofiev

=== Boris Lyatoshinsky ===
- Lesia Dychko
- Leonid Hrabovsky
- Yevhen Stankovych [pupils]
- Valentyn Silvestrov [pupils]

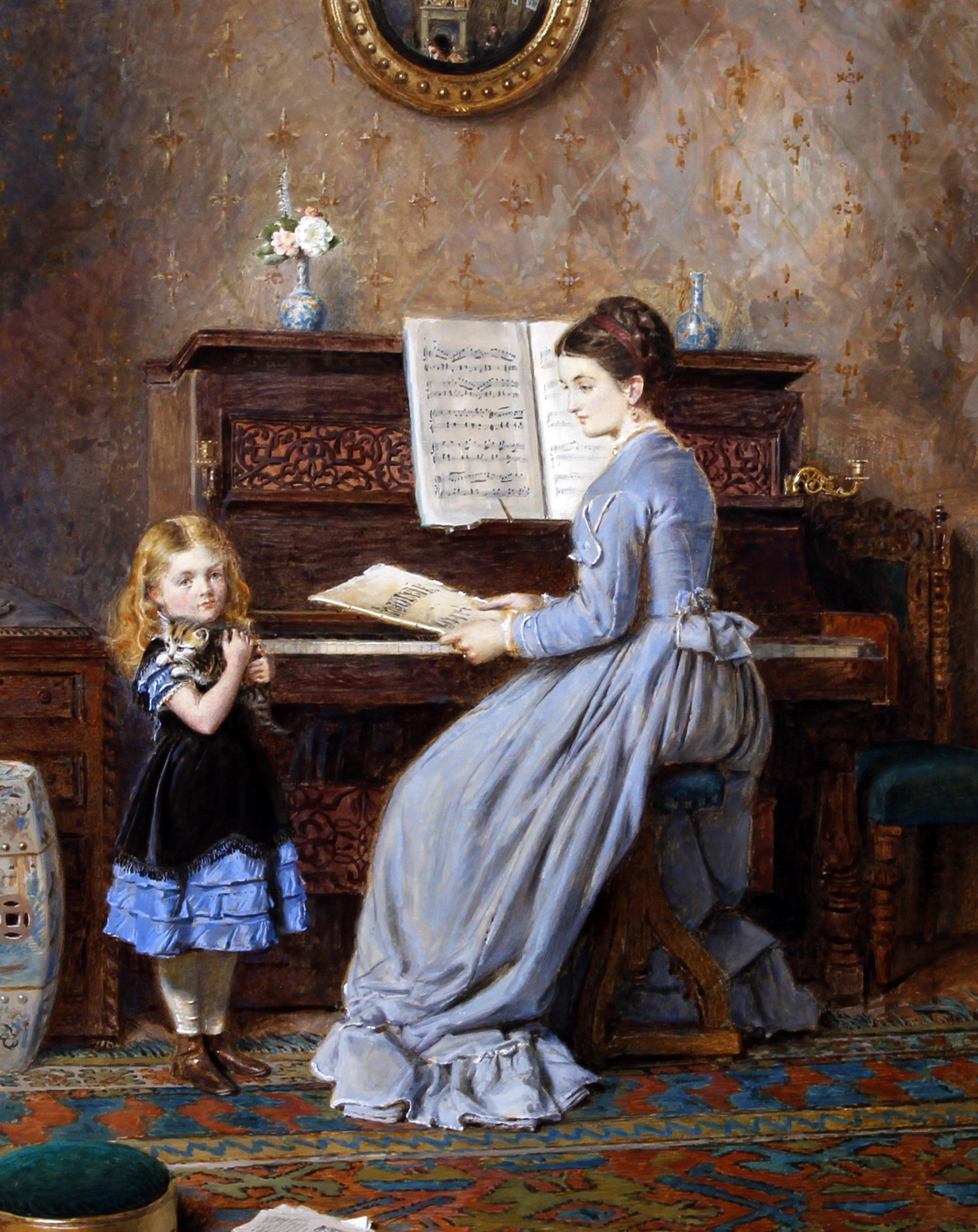

== M ==
=== Terence MacDonagh ===
this teacher's teachers
MacDonagh (1908–1986) studied with teachers including Myrtile Morel and Léon Goossens.
- Neil Black
- Anthony Camden
- Roy Carter
- Gordon Hunt
- Edwin Roxburgh [pupils]
- John Warrack

=== Mieczysław Michailowicz ===
- Ida Haendel

=== Edward MacDowell ===
this teacher's teachers
MacDowell (1860–1908) studied with teachers including Teresa Carreño, Antoine François Marmontel, and Marie Gabriel Augustin Savard.
- Marian MacDowell
- John Patton Marshall
- John Pierce Langs
- Edward Sapir

=== José Maceda ===
- Michael Tenzer [pupils]

=== George Alexander Macfarren ===
this teacher's teachers
Macfarren (1813–1887) studied with teachers including William Henry Holmes, Charles Lucas, Cipriani Potter, and John Smithies.
- Robert Brydges Addison
- Horton Claridge Allison
- Dora Bright
- George Frederick Bristow
- Frederick Corder [pupils]
- Francis William Davenport [pupils]
- Julian Edwards
- Percy Godfrey
- Florence Ashton Marshall
- Tobias Matthay [pupils]
- James McGranahan
- Edwin George Monk
- Alicia Adélaide Needham
- Oliveria Prescott
- Alice Mary Smith
- Elizabeth Stirling [pupils]
- Frederick Westlake
- Maude Valérie White
- Agnes Zimmermann

=== Walter Cecil Macfarren ===
- Ethel Mary Boyce
- Dora Bright
- Llewela Davies
- Stewart Macpherson
- Tobias Matthay [pupils]
- Henry Wood [pupils]
- Agnes Zimmermann

=== Alexander Mackenzie ===
this teacher's teachers
Mackenzie (1847–1935) studied with teachers including Charles Lucas and Eduard Stein.
- Helen Hopekirk [pupils]
- William Wallace [pupils]

=== Elizabeth Maconchy ===
this teacher's teachers
Maconchy (1907–1994) studied with teachers including Arthur Alexander, Edith Boxhill, Gustav Holst, Karel Boleslav Jirák, John Francis Larchet, Charles Wood, and Ralph Vaughan Williams.

=== Giovanni de Macque ===
- Ascanio Mayone

=== Bruno Maderna ===
this teacher's teachers
Maderna (1920–1973) studied with teachers including Antonio Guarnieri, Gian Francesco Malipiero, and Hermann Scherchen.
- Norma Beecroft
- Rocco Di Pietro
- Alcides Lanza [pupils]
- Richard Maxfield [pupils]
- Luigi Nono [pupils]
- Bernard Rands [pupils]
- Ernesto Rubin de Cervin [pupils]

=== Nikita Magaloff ===
this teacher's teachers
Nikita Magaloff (21 February [O.S. 8 February] 1912 – 26 December 1992) studied with teachers including Alexander Siloti and Isidor Philipp.
- Martha Argerich
- Ingrid Haebler
- Lionel Rogg
- Valery Sigalevitch
- Maria Tipo
- Alba Ventura

=== Rudolf Magnus ===
- Rikard Nordraak

=== Gustav Mahler ===
this teacher's teachers
Mahler (1860–1911) studied with teachers including Julius Epstein, Heinrich Fischer, Robert Fuchs, and Franz Krenn.
- Walter Henry Rothwell [pupils]
- Max Steiner
- Robert Winterberg

=== Alphonse Mailly ===
- August de Boeck
- Charles M. Courboin
- Charles Kennedy Scott
- Alfred Wotquenne

=== Artur Malawski ===
this teacher's teachers
Malawski (1904–1957) studied with teachers including Jan Chmielewski and Kazimierz Sikorski.
- Andrzej Dobrowolski [pupils]
- Roman Haubenstock-Ramati [pupils]
- Krzysztof Penderecki [pupils]

=== Ivo Malec ===
- Édith Canat de Chizy
- Denis Dufour
- Philippe Hurel
- Philippe Leroux
- Gérard Pesson

=== Gian Francesco Malipiero ===
this teacher's teachers
Malipiero (1882–1973) studied with teachers including Marco Enrico Bossi.
- Hilda Dianda
- Mario Labroca
- Alcides Lanza [pupils]
- Bruno Maderna [pupils]
- Luigi Nono [pupils]
- Fernando Remacha
- Ernesto Rubin de Cervin [pupils]
- Roger Sessions [pupils]
- Honorio Siccardi [pupils]

=== Witold Maliszewski ===
this teacher's teachers
Maliszewski (1873–1939) studied with teachers including Alexander Glazunov and Nikolai Rimsky-Korsakov.
- Witold Lutosławski [pupils]
- Shimon Shteynberg
- Mykola Vilinsky
- Bolesław Woytowicz

=== Nikolai Malko ===
this teacher's teachers
Malko (1883–1961) studied with teachers including Anatoly Lyadov, Alexander Glazunov, Felix Mottl, and Nikolai Rimsky-Korsakov.
- Leo Ginzburg [pupils]
- Dmitri Shostakovich [pupils]

=== Otto Malling ===
- Paul von Klenau
- Knudåge Riisager

=== Mathilde Mallinger ===
- Lotte Lehmann

=== Francesco Mancini ===
- Davide Perez

=== Eusebius Mandyczewski ===
this teacher's teachers
Mandyczewski (1857–1929) studied with teachers including Robert Fuchs and Gustav Nottebohm.
- Hans Gál [pupils]
- Ede Poldini
- Florica Racovitză-Flondor
- Rosario Scalero [pupils]
- George Szell [pupils]

=== Leopold Mannes ===
- George Rochberg [pupils]

=== Eduard Mantius ===
- Marie Haupt
- Benno Stolzenberg [pupils]

=== André Marchal ===
this teacher's teachers
Marchal studied with teachers including Eugène Gigout.
- André Fleury
- Peter Hurford
- Jean Langlais [pupils]
- Jean-Pierre Leguay
- Louis Thiry

=== Louis Marchand ===
- Louis-Claude Daquin

=== Mathilde Marchesi ===
this teacher's teachers
Marchesi (1821–1913) studied with teachers including Manuel García.
- Suzanne Adams
- Frances Alda
- Sigrid Arnoldson
- Blanche Arral
- Jenny Broch
- Emma Calvé
- Ada Crossley
- Ilma de Murska
- Emma Eames
- Antonietta Fricci
- Mary Garden
- Etelka Gerster
- Katharina Klafsky
- Gabrielle Krauss
- Selma Kurz
- Miriam Licette
- Estelle Liebling [pupils]
- Blanche Marchesi (her daughter)
- Dame Nellie Melba
- Yevgeniya Mravina
- Emma Nevada
- Aglaja Orgeni
- Gina Oselio
- Regina Pacini
- Rosa Papier [pupils]
- Anna Pessiak-Schmerling
- Sarah Robinson-Duff [pupils]
- Sibyl Sanderson
- Evelyn Scotney
- Antoinette Sterling
- Yvonne de Tréville
- Ellen Beach Yaw
- Nadezhda Zabela-Vrubel

=== Adele Marcus ===
this teacher's teachers
Adele Marcus studied with teachers including Joseph Lhévinne and Artur Schnabel.
- Agustin Anievas
- Volker Banfield
- Enrique Bátiz
- Anthony Byrne
- Sergio Calligaris
- Alec Chien
- José Carlos Cocarelli
- Cy Coleman
- William Corbett-Jones
- Robert DeGaetano
- Adolfo Fernández
- Margaret Fingerhut
- Edna Golandsky
- Stewart L. Gordon
- Steven Graff
- Horacio Gutiérrez
- Stephen Hough
- Byron Janis
- Norman Krieger
- Giorgi Latso
- Daniel Lessner
- Neil W. Levin
- Panayis Lyras
- Diana McIntosh
- Beata Moon
- Pascal Nemirovski
- Ken Noda
- Jon Kimura Parker
- Pekinel sisters
- Miguel Franz Pinto
- Douglas Riva
- Santiago Rodriguez
- Jordan Rudess
- Neil Sedaka
- Jeffrey Swann

=== Jean-Étienne Marie ===
this teacher's teachers
Marie (1917–1989) studied with teachers including Olivier Messiaen and Darius Milhaud.
- Mario Lavista [pupils]

=== Gaetano Marinelli ===
- Isabella Colbran

=== Władysława Markiewiczówna ===
- Andrzej Jasiński [pupils]
- Wojciech Kilar
- Kazimierz Kord
- Tadeusz Żmudziński

=== Antoine François Marmontel ===
this teacher's teachers
Marmontel (1816–1898) studied with teachers including Victor Dourlen, Fromental Halévy, Jean-François Le Sueur, and Pierre-Joseph-Guillaume Zimmerman.
- Georges Bizet
- Ignacio Cervantes [pupils]
- Claude Debussy [pupils]
- Louis Diémer [pupils]
- Théodore Dubois [pupils]
- Dominique Ducharme
- Alphonse Duvernoy [pupils]
- Edmond Duvernoy
- Henri Fissot
- Gustave Gagnon
- Henri Ghys
- Ernest Guiraud [pupils]
- Vincent d'Indy [pupils]
- Eugène Ketterer
- Théodore Lack
- Albert Lavignac [pupils]
- Marguerite Long [pupils]
- Edward MacDowell [pupils]
- Émile Paladilhe
- Romain-Octave Pelletier I [pupils]
- Gabriel Pierné
- Francis Planté
- Maria Lluïsa Ponsa
- Paul Rougnon
- Olga Samaroff [pupils]
- Antoine Simon
- Hilda Thegerström [pupils]
- Francis Thomé
- Theodore Tourrier
- Paul Wachs
- Józef Wieniawski
- Jules Auguste Wiernsberger
- André Wormser

=== Friedrich Wilhelm Marpurg ===
- Johann Friedrich Wilhelm Wenckel

=== Roger Marsh ===
this teacher's teachers
Marsh (b. 1949) studied with teachers including Ian Kellam and Bernard Rands.
- John Abram
- Richard Causton [pupils]
- Andrew Hugill
- Andy Quin
- Paul Whitty

=== Frank Marshall ===
this teacher's teachers
Marhshall (1883-1959) studied with teachers including Enrique Granados.
- Vicente Asencio [pupils]
- Alicia de Larrocha [pupils]
- Carlota Garriga [pupils]
- Maurice Ohana
- Rosa Sabater
- Montserrat Torrent [pupils]
- Paquita Madriguera

=== Martin Pierre Marsick ===
this teacher's teachers
Marsick (1847–1924) studied with teachers including Désiré Heynberg, Hubert Léonard, and Lambert Massart.
- George Enescu [pupils]
- Carl Flesch [pupils]
- Eugène Sauzay [pupils]
- Jacques Thibaud [pupils]

=== Maurice Martenot ===
- Karel Goeyvaerts
- Jeanne Loriod
- Ginette Martenot (sister)
- Georges Savaria [pupils]
- Gilles Tremblay [pupils]

=== Frank Martin ===
- Karlheinz Stockhausen [pupils]

=== Giovanni Battista Martini ===
this teacher's teachers
"Padre Martini" studied with teachers including Giacomo Antonio Perti.
- Johann Christian Bach [pupils]
- Maksym Berezovsky
- Ferdinando Bertoni [pupils]
- Pater Luigi Braccini
- Charles Broche [pupils]
- Giovanni Battista Cirri
- Antonio Maria Fossombroni
- Giovanni Battista Gaiani
- Quirino Gasparini
- Lorenzo Gibelli
- André Ernest Modeste Grétry
- Giuseppe de Majo
- Stanislao Mattei [pupils]
- Wolfgang Amadeus Mozart [pupils]
- Josef Mysliveček [pupils]
- Johann Gottlieb Naumann
- Vincenzo Pallavicini
- Luigi Antonio Sabbatini
- Giuseppe Sarti [pupils]
- Giuseppe Simoni [pupils]
- Georg Joseph Vogler [pupils]

=== Vicente Martín y Soler ===
- Mikhail Vielgorsky

=== Salvatore Martirano ===
- Howard J. Buss
- Dennis Eberhard
- James Fulkerson
- Jan Gilbert
- Chris Granner
- Maggi Payne [pupils]
- David Rosenboom [pupils]
- Yehuda Yannay

=== Bohuslav Martinů ===
- Burt Bacharach
- Chou Wen-chung [pupils]
- Alan Hovhaness [pupils]
- Vítězslava Kaprálová
- Jan Novák
- H. Owen Reed
- Howard Shanet

=== Adolf Bernhard Marx ===
this teacher's teachers
Marx (1795-1866) studied with teachers including Daniel Gottlob Türk and Carl Friedrich Zelter.
- Ludwig Deppe [pupils]
- Adolph Kullak [pupils]
- Anton Rubinstein [pupils]
- Georg Vierling
- Józef Wieniawski
- Nikolai Zaremba [pupils]

=== Joseph Marx ===
this teacher's teachers
Marx (1882–1964) studied with teachers including Erich Wolf Degner.
- Johann Nepomuk David [pupils]
- Richard Flury
- Ivana Lang
- Alois Melichar
- Finn Høffding [pupils]
- Hisatada Otaka
- Florica Racovitză-Flondor
- Lucijan Marija Škerjanc [pupils]
- Fritz Spielmann
- Paul Ulanowsky
- Clara Wildschut

=== Eduard Marxsen ===
this teacher's teachers
Marxsen (1806–1887) studied with teachers including Carl Maria von Bocklet, Johann Heinrich Clasing, and Ignaz von Seyfried.
- Johannes Brahms [pupils]
- Ferdinand Thieriot

=== William Mason ===
this teacher's teachers
Mason (1829–1908) studied with teachers including Moritz Hauptmann, Franz Liszt, Ignaz Moscheles, and Henry Schmidt.
- William Hall Sherwood

=== Angelo Mascheroni ===
- Spyridon Samaras

=== Lambert Massart ===
this teacher's teachers
Massart (1811–1892) studied with teachers including Rodolphe Kreutzer.
- Alfred De Sève
- Fritz Kreisler
- José White Lafitte
- Martin Pierre Marsick [pupils]
- Charles Martin Loeffler
- Léon Reynier
- Pablo de Sarasate
- César Thomson [pupils]
- Teresina Tua
- Camilla Urso
- Henryk Wieniawski [pupils]
- Eugène Ysaÿe [pupils]

=== Rodolphe Massart ===
this teacher's teachers
Massart (1840–1910) studied with teachers including .
- César Thomson [pupils]
- Eugène Ysaÿe [pupils]

=== William Masselos ===
this teacher's teachers
Masselos (1920-1992) studied with teachers including Carl Friedberg.
- Nina Gamble Kennedy

=== Jules Massenet ===
this teacher's teachers
Massenet (1842–1912) studied with teachers including Ernest Guiraud, Napoléon Henri Reber, and Marie Gabriel Augustin Savard.
- Valborg Aulin
- André Bloch
- Gustave Charpentier
- Ernest Chausson
- George Enescu
- Reynaldo Hahn [pupils]
- Charles Koechlin [pupils]
- Raoul Laparra [pupils]
- Spyridon Samaras
- Marie Emmanuel Augustin Savard
- Gerhard Schjelderup
- Mon Schjelderup
- Florent Schmitt
- Charles Silver
- Zygmunt Stojowski
- Paul Vidal [pupils]

=== Georges Mathias ===
this teacher's teachers
Mathias studied with teachers including François Bazin, Frédéric Chopin, Fromental Halévy, and Friedrich Kalkbrenner.
- Teresa Carreño [pupils]
- Camille Chevillard [pupils]
- Paul Dukas [pupils]
- Camille Erlanger
- James Huneker
- Henri O'Kelly
- Isidor Philipp [pupils]
- Raoul Pugno [pupils]
- Alfonso Rendano
- Erik Satie [pupils]
- Ernest Schelling
- José Tragó
- Alberto Williams [pupils]

=== Émile Mathieu ===
this teacher's teachers
Mathieu (1844–1932) studied with teachers including Auguste Dupont.
- Arthur De Greef [pupils]

=== Stanislao Mattei ===
this teacher's teachers
Mattei (1750–1825) studied with teachers including Giovanni Battista Martini.
- Gaetano Donizetti
- Yevstigney Fomin
- Giovanni Battista Gaiani
- Angelo Mariani
- Francesco Morlacchi [pupils]
- Giovanni Agostino Perotti
- Luigi Felice Rossi
- Gioachino Rossini
- Giovanni Tadolini
- Christian Theodor Weinlig [pupils]
- Giuseppe Vianesi

=== Tobias Matthay ===
this teacher's teachers
Matthay (1858– 1945) studied with teachers including William Sterndale Bennett, George Alexander Macfarren, Ebenezer Prout, and Arthur Sullivan.
- Arthur Alexander [pupils]
- Putnam Aldrich [pupils]
- Ethel Bartlett
- Arnold Bax [pupils]
- York Bowen [pupils]
- Alan Bush [pupils]
- Harriet Cohen
- Harold Craxton [pupils]
- Clifford Curzon [pupils]
- Raie Da Costa
- Harry Dean
- Hilda Dederich
- Norman Fraser
- Herbert Fryer [pupils]
- Cécile Staub Genhart
- Helen Gunderson
- Adolph Hallis
- Myra Hess [pupils]
- Colin Horsley
- Dorothy Howell [pupils]
- Frank Hutchens
- Guy Jonson
- Eileen Joyce
- Vivian Langrish
- Denise Lassimonne
- Ray Lev
- Leo Livens [pupils]
- Ernest Lush
- Moura Lympany
- Desirée MacEwan
- Lilias Mackinnon
- Frank Mannheimer
- John Blackwood McEwen [pupils]
- Eunice Norton
- Gertrude Peppercorn
- Ivan Phillipowsky
- Margaret Portch
- Lytle Powell
- Ernest Read [pupils]
- Rae Robertson
- Irene Scharrer
- Felix Swinstead
- Egerton Tidmarsh
- Percy Waller [pupils]
- Cuthbert Whitemore [pupils]

=== Jean-Pierre Maurin ===
this teacher's teachers
Maurin (1822-1894) studied with teachers including Pierre Baillot and François Habeneck.
- Henri Berthelier [pupils]
- Lucien Capet [pupils]

=== Antoinette Mauté de Fleurville ===
- Claude Debussy [pupils]

=== Nicholas Maw ===
this teacher's teachers
Maw studied with teachers including Lennox Berkeley and Nadia Boulanger.
- Piers Hellawell [pupils]

=== Richard Maxfield ===
this teacher's teachers
Maxfield studied with teachers including John Cage, Aaron Copland, Luigi Dallapiccola, Ernst Krenek, Bruno Maderna, and Roger Sessions.
- La Monte Young [pupils]

=== František Maxián ===
this teacher's teachers
Maxián (1907–1971) studied with teachers including Vilém Kurz.
- Antonín Kubálek
- Jan Panenka
- Peter Toperczer
- Sláva Vorlová

=== Charles Mayer ===
this teacher's teachers
Mayer studied with teachers including John Field.
- Filipina Brzezińska-Szymanowska
- Mikhail Glinka [pupils]

=== Wilhelm Mayer ===
this teacher's teachers
Mayer (1831–1898) studied with teachers including C. F. Pietsch .
- Ferruccio Busoni [pupils]
- Richard Heuberger [pupils]
- Wilhelm Kienzl
- Emil von Reznicek
- Richard Sahla
- Felix Weingartner

=== Thomas Mayne ===
this teacher's teachers
Mayne (–) studied with teachers including .
- Carmelo Pace [pupils]

=== Simon Mayr ===
this teacher's teachers
Mayr (1763–1845) studied with teachers including Ferdinando Bertoni.
- Gaetano Donizetti
- Giovanni Battista Rubini

=== Carl Mayrberger ===
- Géza Zichy

=== Joseph Mayseder ===
this teacher's teachers
Mayseder (1789–1863) studied with teachers including Emanuel Aloys Förster, Ignaz Schuppanzigh, and Paul Wranitzky.
- Heinrich Wilhelm Ernst

=== Virgilio Mazzocchi ===
this teacher's teachers
Mazzocchi (1597–1646) studied with teachers including Domenico Mazzocchi.
- Matteo Simonelli [pupils]

=== Alberto Mazzucato ===
this teacher's teachers
Mazzucato (1813–1877) studied with teachers including Bresciano .
- Arrigo Boito
- Antônio Carlos Gomes
- Isidore de Lara
- Marietta Gazzaniga
- Benedetto Junck
- Marcella Lotti della Santa
- Amilcare Ponchielli [pupils]
- Sims Reeves
- Ivan Zajc

=== John Blackwood McEwen ===
this teacher's teachers
McEwen (1868–1948) studied with teachers including Frederick Corder, Tobias Matthay, and Ebenezer Prout.
- William Alwyn [pupils]
- Dorothy Howell [pupils]
- Priaulx Rainier [pupils]

=== Colin McPhee ===
this teacher's teachers
McPhee (1900–1964) studied with teachers including Arthur Friedheim, Gustav Strube, and Edgard Varèse.
- Paul Earls
- Ruby Ornstein

=== Paul Méfano ===
this teacher's teachers
Méfano (1937–2020) studied with teachers including Messiaen and Milhaud .
- Misato Mochizuki

=== Lambert Joseph Meerts ===
this teacher's teachers
Meerts (1800–1863) studied with teachers including Pierre Baillot and Jean-Henri Simon.
- Hugo Heermann [pupils]

=== Étienne Méhul ===
this teacher's teachers
Méhul (1763–1817) studied with teachers including Jean-Frédéric Edelmann and Wilhelm Hanser.
- Fromental Halévy [pupils]
- Joseph Daussoigne-Méhul [pupils]

=== Gustav Meier ===
this teacher's teachers
Meier (1929–2016) studied with teachers including Hans Swarowsky.
- Marin Alsop
- Roger Briggs
- Alexander Frey
- Yakov Kreizberg
- John Mauceri
- Bobby McFerrin
- Antonio Pappano
- Rico Saccani
- Jordan Randall Smith
- Carl St. Clair

=== Salvatore Meluzzi ===
this teacher's teachers
Meluzzi (1813–1897) studied with teachers including Giuseppe Baini, Otto Nicolai, and Henrik Rung.
- Stanislao Falchi [pupils]

=== Felix Mendelssohn ===
this teacher's teachers
Mendelssohn (1809–1847) studied with teachers including Ludwig Berger, Ignaz Moscheles, and Carl Friedrich Zelter.
- Charles Gounod [pupils]
- Charles Edward Horsley [pupils]
- Carl Reinecke [pupils]
- W. S. Rockstro [pupils]
- Camille-Marie Stamaty [pupils]
- Friedrich Hieronymus Truhn
- Richard Wüerst [pupils]

=== Manuel Mendes ===
- Manuel Cardoso
- Filipe de Magalhães

=== Martin-Joseph Mengal ===
this teacher's teachers
Mengal (1784-1851) studied with teachers including Charles Simon Catel and Frédéric Duvernoy.
- François-Auguste Gevaert [pupils]

=== Isolde Menges ===
this teacher's teachers
Menges (1893–1976) studied with teachers including Leopold Auer, Carl Flesch, and Leon Sametini.
- Suzanne Rozsa

=== Peter Mennin ===
this teacher's teachers
Mennin studied with teachers including Howard Hanson, Normand Lockwood, and Bernard Rogers.
- Jack Behrens
- Charles L. Bestor
- Richard Danielpour
- Jacob Druckman [pupils]
- Karl Korte
- Claire Polin

=== Tugdual Menon ===
- Claudio Merulo [pupils]

=== Gian Carlo Menotti ===
this teacher's teachers
Menotti studied with teachers including Nadia Boulanger and Rosario Scalero.
- Olga Gorelli
- Lee Hoiby
- Stanley Hollingsworth
- Leonard Kastle
- George Rochberg [pupils]
- Luigi Zaninelli [pupils]

=== Yehudi Menuhin ===
this teacher's teachers
Menuhin studied with teachers including George Enescu and Louis Persinger.
- Nicola Benedetti
- Paul Coletti
- Donnie Deacon
- Csaba Erdélyi
- Nigel Kennedy
- Peter Tanfield
- Benet McLean

=== Saverio Mercadante ===
this teacher's teachers
Mercadante studied with teachers including Fedele Fenaroli and Niccolò Antonio Zingarelli.
- Virginia Gabriel
- Albert Grisar
- Paolo Serrao [pupils]

=== Aarre Merikanto ===
- Paavo Heininen [pupils]
- Joonas Kokkonen
- Usko Meriläinen
- Einojuhani Rautavaara [pupils]
- Aulis Sallinen [pupils]

=== Frank Merrick ===
this teacher's teachers
Merrick (1886–1981) studied with teachers including Theodor Leschetizky.
- Michael Garrett
- David Gow
- Thomas Pitfield [pupils]
- Alan Rawsthorne [pupils]

=== A. Tillman Merritt ===
- Daniel Pinkham

=== Claudio Merulo ===
this teacher's teachers
Merulo (1533–1604) studied with teachers including Tugdual Menon.
- Giovanni Battista Conforti
- Francesco Stivori

=== Carlos de Mesquita ===
- Francisco Braga

=== Olivier Messiaen ===
this teacher's teachers
Messiaen (1908–1992) studied with teachers including Paul Dukas, Marcel Dupré, Maurice Emmanuel, César-Abel Estyle, Jean Gallon, Noël Gallon, and Charles-Marie Widor.

As well as being a prominent composer, the Frenchman Olivier Messiaen was a noted teacher of musical analysis, harmony and composition at the Paris Conservatoire from the 1940s until he retired in 1978. He also taught classes at the Darmstadt new music summer school in 1949 and 1950. This list of students of Olivier Messiaen contains some of the musicians who (like Pierre Boulez, Yvonne Loriod and George Benjamin) attended his classes, or who (like Peter Hill and Jennifer Bate) studied privately with the composer or collaborated with him in preparation for their performances of his music.

- Olivier Alain
- William Albright [pupils] (Paris Conservatoire, 1968–1969)
- Émilien Allard
- Juan Allende-Blin
- Gilbert Amy
- Solange Ancona
- Jurriaan Andriessen
- Jean Barraqué (Paris Conservatoire)
- Gisèle Barreau
- Jennifer Bate
- Sadao Bekku
- George Benjamin (Paris Conservatoire, later half of the 1970s)
- Easley Blackwood Jr. [pupils] (Paris Conservatoire, 1954)
- William Bolcom [pupils] (Paris Conservatoire, 1960)
- Pierre Boulez [pupils] (Paris Conservatoire, 1940s)
- Joanna Bruzdowicz
- John Carewe [pupils]
- Qigang Chen
- Marius Constant
- Philip Corner
- George Couroupos (Paris Conservatoire, 1968–1972)
- Melanie Ruth Daiken
- Nguyen-Thien Dao
- Peter Maxwell Davies [pupils] (auditeur at the Paris Conservatoire)
- Michel Decoust
- Liam Devlin
- Julio Estrada
- Michel Fano
- Luc Ferrari
- Serge Garant
- Steven Gellman
- Alexander Goehr [pupils] (Paris Conservatoire, '56–'57)
- Karel Goeyvaerts
- Ida Gotkovsky (Paris Conservatoire, late 1940s)
- Gérard Grisey [pupils] (Paris Conservatoire)
- Pierre Henry
- Jacques Hétu
- Peter Hill
- Ivan Jevtić
- Betsy Jolas (late 1940s)
- Quincy Jones
- Milko Kelemen
- Ginette Keller
- Oliver Knussen
- György Kurtág
- Alcides Lanza [pupils]
- Ivana Loudová
- Ton de Leeuw [pupils]
- Jean-Pierre Leguay
- Maurice Le Roux (Paris Conservatoire)
- Michaël Lévinas (Paris Conservatoire)
- Gerald Levinson (Paris Conservatoire, 1970s)
- Yvonne Loriod [pupils] (Paris Conservatoire, 1940s, she became the composer's second wife)
- François-Bernard Mâche
- Jean-Étienne Marie [pupils]
- Jean-Louis Martinet (Paris Conservatoire)
- Bruce Mather
- Roger Matton
- Jenny McLeod
- Paul Méfano
- Michel Merlet
- Jacques-Louis Monod (Paris Conservatoire, 1940s)
- Tristan Murail [pupils] (Paris Conservatoire, 1967–72)
- Serge Nigg (Paris Conservatoire)
- Marlos Nobre (Latin-American Center, Buenos Aires)
- Nicolas Panagopoulos (Paris Conservatoire, 1974–1978)
- Jean-Louis Petit
- José Almeida Prado
- André Prévost
- Grażyna Pstrokońska-Nawratil [pupils]
- Marta Ptaszynska
- Ruben Radica
- Michèle Reverdy
- Mauricio Rosenmann (Paris Conservatoire, 1962–64)
- Kimi Sato (Paris Conservatoire, 1972–1976)
- Georges Savaria (Schola Cantorum de Paris, 1930s)
- Brian Schober (Paris Conservatoire)
- Robert Sherlaw Johnson [pupils] (Paris Conservatoire)
- Makoto Shinohara
- Sylvia Soublette
- Karlheinz Stockhausen [pupils] (Paris Conservatoire, 1952)
- Mikis Theodorakis (Paris Conservatoire, 1950s)
- Michiko Toyama
- Vlastimir Trajković
- Gilles Tremblay
- Robert Turner
- Igor Wakhévitch
- Iannis Xenakis [pupils] (briefly referred to Messiaen at the Paris Conservatoire in 1951)
- Akio Yashiro [pupils]
- Leni Alexander
- Ida Gotkovsky
- Yvonne Desportes
- Elsa Barraine

[Barraine]

=== Metastasio ===
this teacher's teachers
Metastasio (1698–1782) studied with teachers including Nicola Porpora.
- Caterina Gabrielli
- Marie Antoinette
- Marianna Martines

=== Leonard B. Meyer ===
this teacher's teachers
Meyer studied with teachers including Stefan Wolpe, Otto Luening, and Aaron Copland.
- Robert Gjerdingen
- Richard Swift [pupils]

=== Friedrich Wilhelm Meyer ===
this teacher's teachers
Meyer (1818–1893) studied with teachers including .
- Richard Strauss [pupils]

=== Aleksander Michałowski ===
this teacher's teachers
Michałowski (1851–1938) studied with teachers including Theodor Coccius, Karol Mikuli, Ignaz Moscheles, and Carl Reinecke.
- Jan Drozdowski [pupils]
- Róża Etkin-Moszkowska
- Bolesław Kon
- Wanda Landowska [pupils]
- Mischa Levitzki
- Heinrich Neuhaus [pupils]
- Henryk Pachulski
- Vladimir Sofronitsky
- Władysław Szpilman
- Bolesław Woytowicz
- Alexander Zakin

=== Wilhelm Middelschulte ===
this teacher's teachers
Middelschulte (1863–1943) studied with teachers including Carl August Haupt.
- Cecilia Clare Bocard
- Virgil Fox

=== Hubert Stanley Middleton ===
- David Barlow
- Mary Berry
- James Clifford Brown
- Mervyn Horder
- Gerald Hocken Knight
- Raymond Leppard
- William Mann
- Bernard Rose
- Stephen Wilkinson

=== Karol Mikuli ===
- Yevheniya Barvinska
- Raoul Koczalski
- Aleksander Michałowski [pupils]
- Moriz Rosenthal [pupils]
- Ciprian Porumbescu [pupils]

=== Moritz Mildner ===
this teacher's teachers
Mildner (1812-1865) studied with teachers including Friedrich Wilhelm Pixis.
- Antonín Bennewitz [pupils]
- Jan Hřímalý [pupils]
- Karel Komzák I
- Ernst Skalitzky
- Florián Zajíc

=== Percy Hilder Miles ===
this teacher's teachers
Miles (1878-1922) studied with teachers including Francis William Davenport, Walter Battison Haynes, and Hans Wessely.
- Rebecca Clarke

=== Darius Milhaud ===
this teacher's teachers
Milhaud (1892–1974) studied with teachers including Henri Berthelier, Vincent d'Indy, and André Gedalge.
- Murray Adaskin
- Sieglinde Ahrens
- Stephen Albert
- Roger Albin
- Gilbert Amy
- Ruth Anderson
- T. J. Anderson
- Elinor Armer
- Larry Austin [pupils]
- Burt Bacharach
- Louis W. Ballard
- Alain Bancquart
- Irwin Bazelon
- Robert Beadell [pupils]
- Jack Behrens
- Sadao Bekku
- Arthur Berger [pupils]
- William Bolcom [pupils]
- Jacques Bondon
- Andrée Bonhomme
- Benjamin Boretz [pupils]
- Thérèse Brenet
- Darius Brubeck
- Dave Brubeck
- Howard Brubeck
- Walter Buczynski
- Edvard Hagerup Bull
- Charles Chaynes
- Laura Clayton
- Adrienne Clostre
- Michael Colgrass
- Dick Collins
- Jean Coulthard
- Michel Decoust
- Georges Delerue
- Charles Dodge
- Pierre Max Dubois
- Jonathan Elkus
- Jean-Claude Éloy
- David Epstein
- Richard Felciano
- Don Freund
- Steven Gellman
- Janice Giteck
- Philip Glass
- Karel Goeyvaerts
- Olga Gorelli
- Ray Green
- Jean-Pierre Guézec
- Benjamín Gutiérrez Sáenz
- André Hajdu
- Herb Harrison
- John Heiss
- Stanley Hollingsworth
- Simeon ten Holt
- Ben Johnston [pupils]
- Betsy Jolas
- Paul Kont
- Robert Kurka
- György Kurtág
- Eugene Kurtz [pupils]
- Nicole Lachartre
- Anne Lauber
- Claude Lefebvre
- Emanuel Leplin
- Robert Linn
- Edwin London
- Yvonne Loriod [pupils]
- Jean-Étienne Marie [pupils]
- Vincent McDermott
- Boyd McDonald
- Paul Méfano
- Francis Miroglio
- Robert Moran
- Otto Mortensen
- Hall Overton [pupils]
- Thomas Pasatieri
- Jean Perrin
- Zenobia Powell Perry
- Claude Prey
- María Teresa Prieto
- Dušan Radić
- Steve Reich
- John Donald Robb
- Neil Rolnick
- Jerome Rosen
- Marcel Rubin
- Pete Rugolo
- Pedro Sáenz
- Louis Saguer
- Carol Sams
- Peter Schickele
- Ramon Sender
- Gerald Shapiro
- Seymour Shifrin [pupils]
- Yorgos Sicilianos
- Stanley J Silverman
- Ezra Sims
- Bill Smith
- Leland Smith [pupils]
- Harry Somers
- Sylvia Soublette
- Karlheinz Stockhausen [pupils]
- Morton Subotnick [pupils]
- Gloria Wilson Swisher
- Diane Thome [pupils]
- Antoine Tisné
- Héctor Tosar
- Joan Tower
- Michiko Toyama
- Lester Trimble
- John Milton Ward IV
- David Ward-Steinman
- Katharine Mulky Warne
- Gordon Watson
- Peter Westergaard [pupils]
- Iannis Xenakis [pupils]
- James Yannatos
- Victor Yellin [pupils]

=== Rosalie Miller ===
- Regina Resnik

=== Hamish Milne ===
this teacher's teachers
Milne (1939–2020) studied with teachers including Guido Agosti and Harold Craxton.
- Roderick Chadwick

=== Anthony Milner ===
this teacher's teachers
Milner studied with teachers including R. O. Morris and Mátyás Seiber.
- John Buller
- John Carmichael
- Anthony Gilbert [pupils]
- Malcolm Lipkin
- David Matthews
- William Mival
- Hugh Wood [pupils]

=== Miloje Milojević ===
- Ludmila Frajt

=== Lluís Millet ===
this teacher's teachers
Millet (1867–1941) studied with teachers including Felip Pedrell and Carles Vidiella.
- Maria Canals i Cendrós [pupils]

=== Nathan Milstein ===
this teacher's teachers
Milstein (1904–1992) studied with teachers including Leopold Auer, Pyotr Stolyarsky, and Eugène Ysaÿe.
- Erick Friedman
- Dylana Jenson

=== Akira Miyoshi ===
this teacher's teachers
Miyoshi studied with teachers including Henri Challan, Raymond Gallois-Montbrun, Kozaburo Hirai, and Tomojirō Ikenouchi.
- Shin'ichirō Ikebe

=== Emil Młynarski ===
this teacher's teachers
Młynarski (1870–1935) studied with teachers including Leopold Auer, Anatoly Lyadov, and Nikolai Rimsky-Korsakov.
- Paul Kletzki
- Paul Kochanski
- Wiktor Łabuński [pupils]
- Pyotr Stolyarsky [pupils]

=== Robert Moevs ===
- Gerald Bennett [pupils]
- James Boros [pupils]
- Eibhlis Farrell [pupils]
- Geoffrey Hass [pupils]
- Kendall Kennison [pupils]
- Joyce Orenstein [pupils]
- Judith Shatin [pupils]
- David Walther [pupils]
- Richard Edward Wilson [pupils]

=== Benno Moiseiwitsch ===
this teacher's teachers
Moiseiwitsch (1890–1963) studied with teachers including Dmitry Klimov and Theodor Leschetizky.
- Charles Lynch [pupils]
- Malcolm Sargent [pupils]

=== Bernhard Molique ===
this teacher's teachers
Molique (1802–1869) studied with teachers including Pietro Rovelli.
- Henry Blagrove
- Virginia Gabriel
- Alfred Mellon
- Jane Roeckel

=== Jérôme-Joseph de Momigny ===
- August Philipp Peellaert [pupils]

=== Stanisław Moniuszko ===
this teacher's teachers
Moniuszko studied with teachers including Carl Friedrich Rungenhagen.
- César Cui [pupils]
- Zygmunt Noskowski [pupils]

=== Georg Matthias Monn ===
this teacher's teachers
Monn (1717–1750) studied with teachers including unknown .
- Johann Georg Albrechtsberger [pupils](probably)

=== John La Montaine ===
this teacher's teachers
La Montaine studied with teachers including Nadia Boulanger, Howard Hanson, and Bernard Rogers.
- Robert Morris [pupils]

=== Antonio Montanari ===
- Johann Georg Pisendel [pupils]

=== Philippe de Monte ===
- Giovanni de Macque [pupils]

=== Pierre Monteux ===
this teacher's teachers
Monteux (1875–1964) studied with teachers including Henri Berthelier and Théophile Laforge.
- René Leibowitz [pupils]

=== Claudio Monteverdi ===
this teacher's teachers
Monteverdi studied with teachers including Marc'Antonio Ingegneri.
- Francesco Cavalli ("almost certainly")
- Giovanni Rovetta [pupils]

=== Xavier Montsalvatge ===
this teacher's teachers
Montsalvatge (1912 – 2002) studied with teachers including Eduard Toldrà.
- Carlota Garriga i Kuijpers [pupils]
- Anna Bofill [pupils]

=== Margery Moore ===
this teacher's teachers
Moore (1907-1993) studied with teachers including F. Faull.
- Helmut Kallmann

=== Undine Smith Moore ===
- Camille Williams
- Leon Thompson
- Billy Taylor
- Phil Medley
- Robert Fryson

=== Cristóbal de Morales ===
- Francisco Guerrero

=== Giovanni Morandi ===
- Rosa Morandi

=== Henri Moreau ===
this teacher's teachers
Moreau (1728 – 1803) studied with teachers including Bartolomeo Lustrini and Antonio Aurisicchio.
- André Grétry [pupils]
- Jean-Pantaléon Leclerc [pupils]

=== Orlando Morgan ===
- Benjamin Frankel
- Sidney Harrison [pupils]
- Myra Hess [pupils]
- Marian McPartland
- Charles Wilfred Orr
- Harold Truscott
- Harry Waldo Warner

=== Francesco Morlacchi ===
this teacher's teachers
Morlacchi (1784–1841) studied with teachers including Stanislao Mattei.
- Moritz Hauptmann [pupils]

=== R. O. Morris ===
this teacher's teachers
(1886–1948) studied with teachers including Charles Wood.
- Lan Adomián
- Stanley Bate
- Hugo Cole
- Jean Coulthard
- Stephen Dodgson
- Howard Ferguson [pupils]
- Gerald Finzi
- Peter Racine Fricker [pupils]
- John Gardner
- Inglis Gundry
- Miriam Hyde
- Kenneth V. Jones
- Constant Lambert [pupils]
- Mary Lucas
- Robin Milford
- Anthony Milner [pupils]
- Mervyn Roberts
- Edmund Rubbra [pupils]
- Humphrey Searle
- Bernard Stevens [pupils]
- Michael Tippett [pupils]
- John Verrall [pupils]

=== Robert Morris ===
this teacher's teachers
Morris studied with teachers including Leslie Bassett, Ross Lee Finney, Eugene Kurtz, and John La Montaine.

Composition

- Chester Biscardi
- Robert Carl
- Jon Forshee
- Cynthia Folio
- Vera Ivanova
- Mikel Kuehn
- JoAnn Kuchera-Morin
- Mark Isaacs

Theory

- Brian Alegant
- Richard Cohn
- Dora Hanninen
- Ian Quinn
- Joshua Banks Mailman
- Andrew Washburn Mead

=== Ignaz Moscheles ===
this teacher's teachers
Moscheles studied with teachers including Johann Georg Albrechtsberger, Muzio Clementi, and Bedřich Diviš Weber.
- Horton Claridge Allison
- Woldemar Bargiel [pupils]
- Oscar Beringer [pupils]
- Louis Brassin [pupils]
- Frederic Cowen
- Edward Dannreuther [pupils]
- Felix Otto Dessoff [pupils]
- John Farmer [pupils]
- Zdeněk Fibich [pupils]
- Henrietta Flynn
- Anton Gerke [pupils]
- Edvard Grieg [pupils]
- Alfred Jaëll [pupils]
- Rafael Joseffy [pupils]
- Iwan Knorr [pupils]
- Henry Litolff [pupils]
- William Mason [pupils]
- Felix Mendelssohn [pupils]
- Elizabeth Meeke
- Aleksander Michałowski [pupils]
- Sebastian Bach Mills
- Louis Niedermeyer [pupils]
- Arthur O'Leary [pupils]
- Christian Padel [pupils]
- Robert Papperitz [pupils]
- Ernst Perabo [pupils]
- Michael Quarry [pupils]
- Madeline Schiller
- Pyotr Schurovsky
- Erik Anton Valdemar Siboni
- Edward Hugh Lindsay Sloper
- Constantin Sternberg [pupils]
- Franklin Taylor [pupils]
- Willi and Louis Thern
- Max Vogrich
- Karl Wehle
- Georg Hendrik Witte
- Henry Wylde
- Bruno Zwintscher [pupils]

=== Angus Morrison ===
this teacher's teachers
Morrison (1902–1989) studied with teachers including Thomas Dunhill and Ralph Vaughan Williams.
- Armand D'Angour
- Julius Drake
- Ruth Dyson
- Colin Horsley
- John Lill [pupils]
- Alan Rowlands
- Melvyn Tan

=== Konstantin Mostras ===
this teacher's teachers
Mostras (1886–1965) studied with teachers including Boris Sibor.
- Ivan Galamian [pupils]

=== Moritz Moszkowski ===
this teacher's teachers
Moszkowski (1854–1925) studied with teachers including Theodor Kullak.
- Josef Hofmann [pupils]
- Kathleen Lockhart Manning
- Vlado Perlemuter [pupils]

=== Felix Mottl ===
this teacher's teachers
Mottl (1856–1911) studied with teachers including Felix Otto Dessoff.
- Walter Blume
- Walter Braunfels [pupils]
- Ernest van Dyck
- Nikolai Malko [pupils]
- Wilhelm Petersen
- Fritz Müller-Rehrmann

=== Henry Moule ===
- Dennis Arundell
- Robin Orr
- Philip Radcliffe
- Stephen Wilkinson

=== Luiz António de Moura ===
- Francisco Braga

=== Alexander Moyzes ===
this teacher's teachers
Moyzes (1906–1984) studied with teachers including Vítězslav Novák.
- Igor Bázlik
- Vladimír Bokes
- Peter Breiner
- Ladislav Burlas
- Karol Elbert
- Tibor Frešo
- Juraj Hatrík
- Ladislav Holoubek
- Branislav Hronec
- Ivan Hrušovský
- Šimon Jurovský
- Dezider Kardoš
- Pavol Krška
- Milan Novák
- Andrej Očenáš
- Ivan Parík
- Vašo Patejdl
- Jozef Podprocký
- Jozef Sixta

=== Franz Xaver Wolfgang Mozart ===
this teacher's teachers
F. Mozart (1791–1844) studied with teachers including Johann Georg Albrechtsberger.
- Ernst Pauer [pupils]

=== Leopold Mozart ===
this teacher's teachers
L. Mozart (1719–1787) studied with teachers including Balthasar Siberer.
- Joseph Ignaz Bieling
- Margarethe Marchand
- Wolfgang Amadeus Mozart
- Joseph Woelfl [pupils]

=== Wolfgang Amadeus Mozart ===
this teacher's teachers
Mozart studied with teachers including Leopold Mozart, Giovanni Battista Martini, Josef Mysliveček, and Giusto Fernando Tenducci.
- Thomas Attwood [pupils]
- Josepha Barbara von Auernhammer
- Johann Nepomuk Hummel [pupils]
- Karl Alois, Prince Lichnowsky
- Ignaz von Seyfried [pupils]
- Franz Xaver Süssmayr
- Therese von Trattner
- Anton Wranitzky

=== Adolf Müller Sr. ===
this teacher's teachers
A. Müller Sr. (1801–1886) studied with teachers including Joseph von Blumenthal, Gottfried Rieger, and Joseph Rieger.
- Adolf Müller Jr.

=== Gottlieb Friedrich Müller ===
this teacher's teachers
Müller studied with teachers including Johann Gottlieb Goldberg.
- Friedrich Wilhelm Rust

=== Gordon Mumma ===
this teacher's teachers
Mumma (born 1935) studied with teachers including Ross Lee Finney.
- David Behrman [pupils]
- Chris Brown
- Dennis Eberhard
- Mamoru Fujieda
- Maggi Payne [pupils]
- Jonathan Segel
- Daniel James Wolf

=== Tristan Murail ===
this teacher's teachers
Murail (b. 1947) studied with teachers including Olivier Messiaen.
- Julian Anderson [pupils]
- Carl Christian Bettendorf
- Oscar Bianchi
- James Fei
- Joshua Fineberg
- Suzanne Giraud
- Rozalie Hirs
- Huck Hodge
- Olga Neuwirth
- Katharina Rosenberger
- Oliver Schneller
- Johan Tallgren

=== Raffaele Muti-Papazzurri ===
this teacher's teachers
Muti-Papazzurri (1801–1858) studied with teachers including Unknown .
- Cesare de Sanctis [pupils]

=== Thea Musgrave ===
this teacher's teachers
Musgrave studied with teachers including Nadia Boulanger and Aaron Copland.
- Jan Bach
- Douglas Knehans
- Nicola LeFanu [pupils]

=== Nikolai Myaskovsky ===
this teacher's teachers
Myaskovsky studied with teachers including Reinhold Glière, Nikolai Kazanli, Ivan Kryzhanovsky, Anatoly Lyadov, Nikolai Rimsky-Korsakov, and Jāzeps Vītols.
- Andrei Eshpai
- German Galynin
- Evgeny Golubev
- Dmitry Kabalevsky [pupils]
- Aram Khachaturian [pupils]
- Karen Khachaturian
- Tikhon Khrennikov [pupils]
- Aleksandr Lokshin
- Rodion Shchedrin
- Vissarion Shebalin [pupils]
- Boris Tchaikovsky

=== Josef Mysliveček ===
this teacher's teachers
Mysliveček (1737–1781) studied with teachers including Franz Habermann and Josef Seger.
- Wolfgang Amadeus Mozart [pupils]
