= Nicolas Panagopoulos =

Greek composer

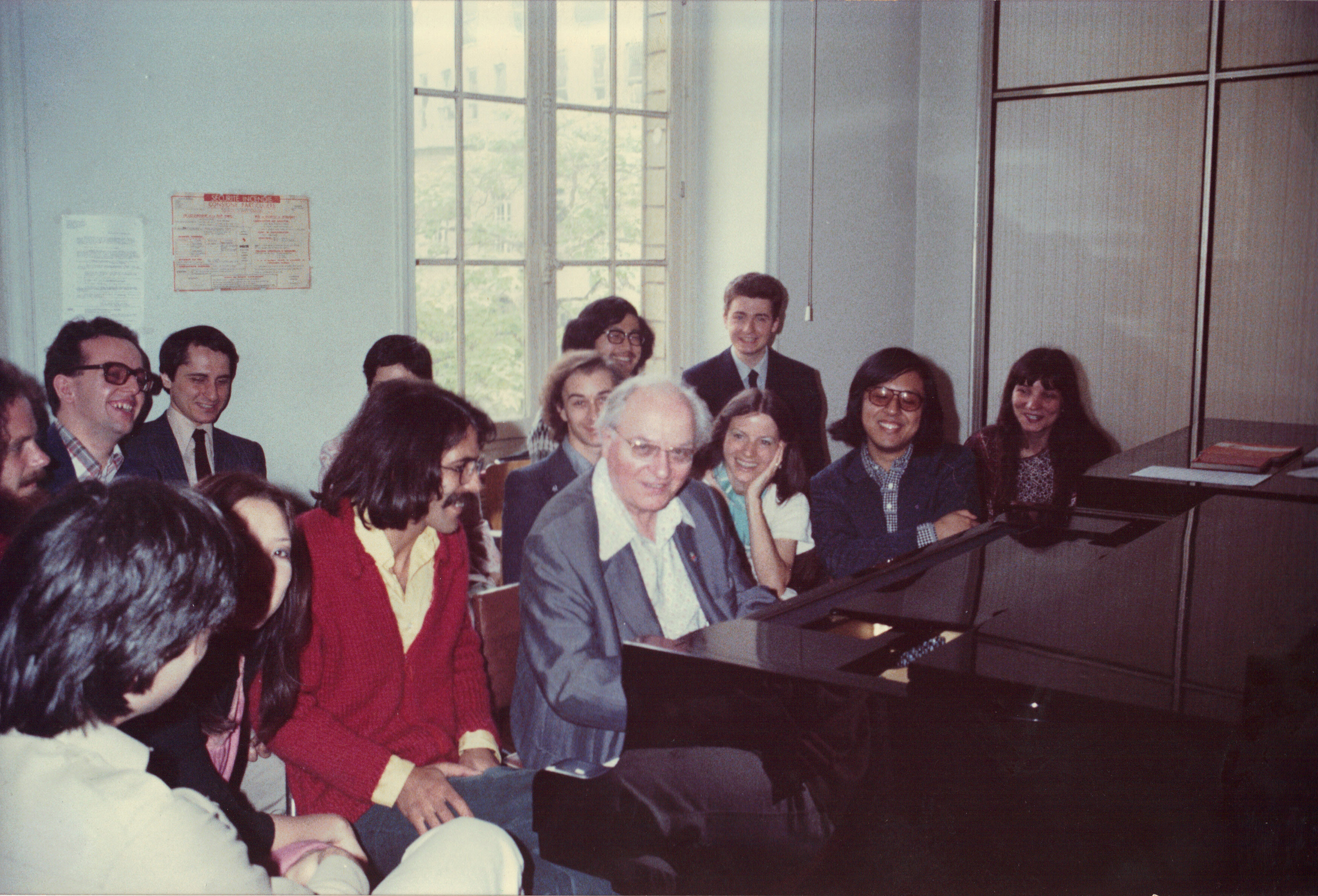
Conservatoire national supérieur de Paris: The composition class of Olivier Messiaen, June 1978; on the left side, Panagopoulos and on the right side Messiaen on the last day of his career in the Conservatory

Nicolas Panagopoulos (born 1954, in Athens) is a Greek composer of contemporary music. He studied piano and music theory at the National Conservatory of Athens. He continued his studies with a scholarship from the French government at the National Superior Conservatory of Paris for Music and Dance (CNSMDP).

== Studies ==
He studied music analysis with Betsy Jolas (1973–1975), electroacoustic music with Pierre Schaeffer (1975–1978) and composition with Olivier Messiaen (1974–1978).

He received a first place award for composition unanimously by the jury.

== Additional studies ==
- Acoustic courses in the laboratory of E. Leip at the University of Jussieu Paris VI
- Seminars on "Image and Sound" at the École Normale of Paris
- Practical training in composition and computer music at IRCAM (Institute de recherche et coordination acoustique/musique)
- Orchestral conducting at the Conservatoire de Strasbourg with Jean-Sébastien Béreau

== Music ==
In 1979, subsidized by the French Ministry of Culture, Panagopoulos conducted research on new music notation and dealt with the potential relations between vision and hearing, a method adapted on his compositions.

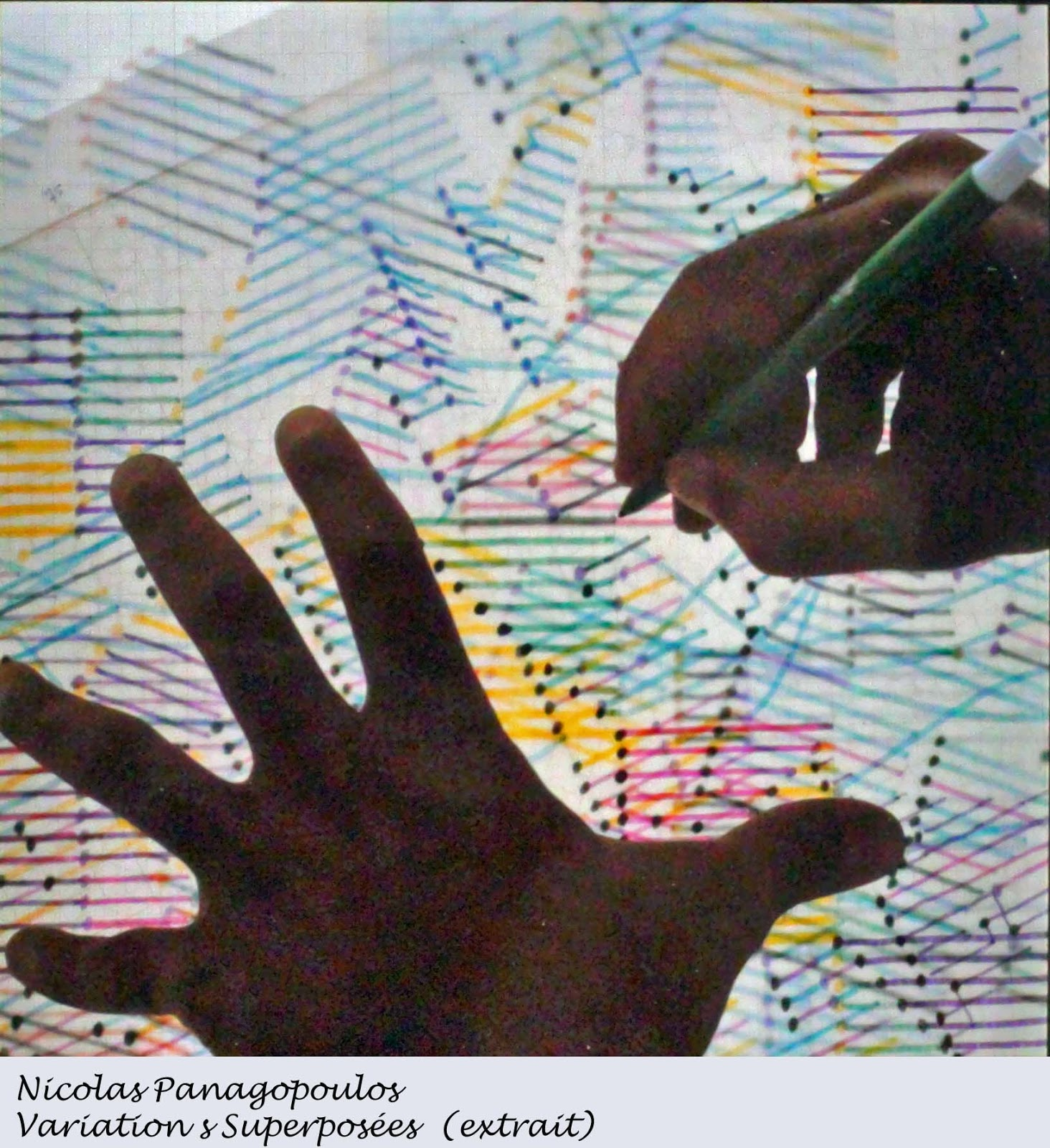
Five Seasons, coloured graphic score (extract)

One of his most significant works is Five Seasons (Cinq saisons, 1981–1982), an assignment of IRCAM for the Metz Festival in France in 1982. The work was written for seven wind instruments, three percussion, and tape. The graphic score is presented on millimetre paper, using different colors corresponding to the different timbres of the orchestra.

In 1982, in a Greek national competition of composition and artistic music he received a distinction award for his work "Sans titre" ("Untitled"), by the Greek Minister of Culture, Melina Mercouri.

Many of his most significant works have been played at festivals and broadcast throughout Greece and abroad.

Since 1988 Panagopoulos lives in Greece, where he devotes his time to composition and music education.

== Works ==
=== Vocal ===
- "38th Parallel", based on a poem of Antonis Zaharopoulos, for bass voice and tuba (1973), Radio France
- "Metabole" for English horn, clavichord, and soprano (1985)

=== Mixed media ===
- "Voyage 2" for tuba and tape (1978) Studio 105, Radio France, soloist: Gérard Buquet
- "Voyage 3" for clarinet, horn, bassoon and tape (1979)
- "White Nights", music theatre for harp and small ensemble (1979)
- Five Seasons for 7 woodwinds, 3 percussions and tape (1981–1982). Inspired by the work of the Swiss painter Jörg Müller, Mutation of a Landscape; Festival International de Musique Contemporain, Ensemble Ιntercontemporain, conducted by Peter Eötvös
- "Newsepia" for flute trombone, violoncello, piano and tape (1989)

=== Orchestral ===
- "Reflections" for two orchestras (1974)
- "Concerto for orchestra" (1978) conducted by Pierre Stoll same year in Paris
- 1985 Athens Festival, Lycabettus and Corfu Festival, conducted by Georgi Notev, Pleven Philharmonic Orchestra

=== Chamber music ===
- "String Quartet", Studio 105, Radio France
- "Tomi" for 2 flutes, clarinet, trumpet, trombone, tuba, violin, violoncello, and piano (1972) Paris, conducted by Pierre Boulez
- "Untitled" for twelve strings (1980, Festival d'Avignon: Cannes Orchestra, conducted by Michel Decoust
- "Trio" for violin, piano, cello (1984)
- "Pentalogue" for five soloists (1986)
- "Plot" for two flutes (1987)
- "Sepia" for wind quartet, string quartet and piano (1988)
- "Despite myself" for flute, bassoon, horn, piano and percussions (1993–94), The Athens Concert Hall, conducted by Theodoros Antoniou

=== Piano ===
- "Sonata" (1970)
- "Ten Icons" (1988) "Parnassos" Concert Hall, piano: Aris Garoufalis

=== Electronic music ===
- "Etude" for tape (1975) Château de Langeais Festival
- "Voyage 1" for tape (1976) Patras Festival (1987)
- "Diabolus in musica" for ten synthesizers and computer (1987)
- "Overdose" digital composition (2001)

=== Choral ===
- "Retort" for mixed chorus and orchestra (1983)
- "Dance of Shadows" for SATB, without text a cappella, Mediterranean Music Conference, Palermo (1992)
- "Ulysses' Lament" for mixed chorus and orchestra (2005)
