= Fritz Müller-Rehrmann =

German composer

Fritz Müller-Rehrmann (3 December 1889, Nuremberg — 2 April 1949, Munich) was a German composer and conductor.

== Early life and education ==
Müller-Rehrman was born in Nuremberg in 1889, the son of a head teacher and music director. He studied first with Felix Mottl and Friedrich Klose at the Münchener Akademie der Tonkunst between 1908 and 1912, before taking masterclasses with Friedrich Gernsheim and Georg Schumann in while serving in World War I.

== Career and political activities ==
After completing his studies, Müller-Rehrmann worked as a conductor in Glogau from 1919 to 1920, returning to Munich in 1921 as a freelance composer. He published a book on music theory, Grundlagen der modernen Harmonik, in three volumes in 1922. Müller-Rehrmann joined NSDAP (Nazi Party) in 1932 (No. 929,179). He worked closely with youth organisations, providing music for gymnastic activities. After World War II he remained in Munich, dying in 1949.

== Selected works ==
=== Orchestral works ===
- Tanzbilder, op. 4.
- Kriegsouvertüre 1914, op. 5 (1916)
- Kleine Suite, op. 12
- Requiem, op. 16
- Suite für Orchester Nr. 2, op. 22 (1935)
- Musik zu Gymnastic und Tanz, op. 24
- Gavotte für Flöte und Streichorchester, op. 27 Nr. 1
- Blumenreigen, op. 30 (1939)
- Lustige Spielerein über eine Volksweise, op. 32

=== Chamber works ===
- Fünf lyrische Stücke für Klavier, op. 6
- Trio für Violine, Violoncello und Klavier Es-Dur, op. 7
- Perpetuum mobile für zwei Klarinetten, op. 8
- Systematische Schule der Klaviertechnik, op. 9
- Streichquartett c-moll, op. 11
- Walzer, op. 13
- Im Garten, Liederzyklus op. 14
- Kleine Sonatine für Klavier e-Moll, op. 19 (1926)
- Atonale Intervallstudien, op. 21
- Kontrapunktische Veränderungen auf den Cantus firmus 'Großer Gott, wir loben Dich' für zwei Klaviere, op. 25
- Grallsucher für Bariton und Klavier

== Resources ==
Deutsche Nationalbibliothek: https://d-nb.info/gnd/117172197

VIAF: https://viaf.org/viaf/17992681/
