= Kobla Ladzekpo =

Ghanaian musical performer

Kobla Ladzekpo was a Ghanaian musical performer. He was known for being the founder and director of Zadonu African Music and Dance Company, as well as a conductor for the CalArts African Music and Dance Ensemble.

Ladzekpo was born and raised in Anyako and moved to the United States in the 1960s. He was a drummer, as well as a retired assistant professor of West African dance and music at the University of California, Los Angeles and the California Institute of the Arts.

As "Seth Kobla Ladzekpo," he recorded an album in 1969, entitled Ewe Music of Ghana. He had his own record label, Zadonu Records.

Ladzekpo died on July 29, 2026, at the age of 93.
