= Alba Ventura =

Spanish classical pianist

Alba Ventura (born 1978) is a Spanish classical pianist. She made her debut as a concert soloist at the age of 13, performing with the Cadaqués Orchestra of Spain, and went on to have an international solo career. She is a professor at the Conservatori Superior de Música del Liceu.

== Early life and education ==
Ventura was born in Barcelona in 1978. She started playing the piano at the age of five. At the age of ten, she began attending the Acadèmia Marshall in Barcelona, where she studied with pianist Alicia de Larrocha.

== Career ==
As a soloist, Ventura has performed with a number of orchestras in Spain and internationally, including the Barcelona Symphony and Catalonia National Orchestra, Orquestra del Gran Teatre del Liceu, the Philharmonia Orchestra, the London Mozart Players, the Hungarian Philharmonic Orchestra, the Czech National Symphony Orchestra and the Auckland Philharmonia Orchestra. She has also held recitals at Wigmore Hall in London, and toured China and the United States.

As a chamber musician, Ventura has collaborated with other artists, including the Brodsky and Takacs quartets, violinist Boris Belkin, violist Isabel Villanueva, and cellist Astrig Siranossian.

Ventura is a professor at the Conservatori Superior de Música del Liceu.

In 2023, Alba Ventura was invited to appear as "premiere pianist" in the soloist role for Spain's Balearic Symphony Orchestra, Majorca.

== Awards and honours ==
In 1998, Ventura was selected in the international auditions of the Young Classical Artists Trust (YCAT).

In 2010, Ventura was awarded the Fundació Príncep de Girona (FPdGi) Arts and Literature Award "for her aptitude, precociousness and sensitivity in piano interpretations".

In 2019, Catalonian Minister of Culture Mariàngela Vilallonga awarded Ventura the Albéniz Medal at the closing ceremony of the 34th Isáac Albéniz Festival.

== Discography ==
- Rachmaninoff (2009)
- Études (2016)
- Mozart: Piano Sonatas, Vol. 1 (2020)
