= Adrienne Clostre =

French composer

Adrienne Clostre (9 October 1921 – 5 August 2006) was a French composer. She was born in Thomery, Seine-et-Marne, and studied at the Conservatoire de Paris with Yves Nat, Darius Milhaud, Jean Rivier and Olivier Messiaen.

After completing her studies, Clostre worked as a composer. She won the Grand Prix de Rome in 1949, the Grand Music Prize of the City of Paris in 1955, the Florence Gould Prize in 1976 and the SACD Prix Musique in 1987. Clostre married architect Robert Biset in 1951 and had two daughters. She died in Serrières.

== Works ==
Selected works include:

- Le chant du cygne
- Lux mundi, children's orch, 1985
- Modal Magic, 1986
- Symphony for Strings, 1949
- Concerto for oboe and chamber orchestra
