= Benet McLean =

British musician

Benet McLean is a British jazz violin and piano virtuoso and singer.

== Life ==
Benet was regarded as a child prodigy and attended the Purcell School for Young Musicians on a scholarship. He was mentored by Yehudi Menuhin.

He has performed at the London Jazz Festival and has collaborated with Partikel, Nightmares on Wax, Laura Mvula and Mahalia, Andy Davies, Benjamin Croft, Omar, Julian Joseph, Sir Simon Rattle, Dave O’Higgins, TY, Steve Williamson, Jean Toussaint, Tommy Smith, Cleveland Watkiss, Yellow Station Blue, Phillip Bent, Orphy Robinson, Kevin Haynes, Roachford, Maxi Jazz (Faithless) and Loose Tubes.

Benet also teaches and is a professor of jazz violin at the London School of Musical Theatre (LPMAM).
