= Madé Lebah =

Musician from Bali, Indonesia

I Made Lebah (1905?-11/18/1996) was a musician and teacher from Peliatan, Ubud, Bali who taught Colin McPhee, Michael Tenzer, Evan Ziporyn and many students of Balinese music. He knew many of the seminal musicians and dancers from the birth of the Kebyar style. He was a co-founder of the Gunung Sari Gamelan ensemble and traveled all over the world leading performances of that group.
