= Peter Tanfield =

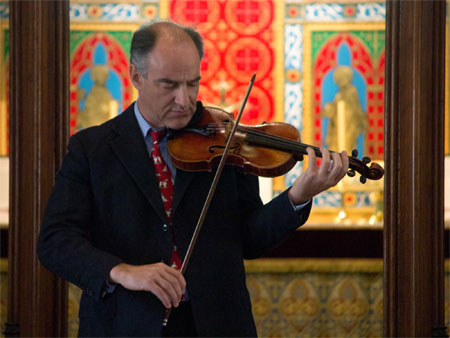
- Peter Tanfield Live in Recital 2012

Background information
- Born: 16 January 1961 (age 65); Penn, Buckinghamshire, England
- Genres: Baroque, Classical, Romantic 20th century
- Occupations: Violinist, Conductor, classical musician
- Instrument: Violin

Peter Tanfield (born 1961) is a British violinist.

== Career ==
Tanfield's high school education was at Clifton College, Bristol. He studied under Igor Ozim, Felix Andrievski, Alberto Lysy, Herman Krebbers and Yehudi Menuhin. As soloist and chamber musician Tanfield has performed throughout Europe, China, Japan, India, Canada, the Middle East, Africa, USA and USSR. He was a prize-winner at The Carl Flesh International Competition, International Mozart Competition and International Bach Competition. He has recorded solo and chamber works for television and radio as well as CD. He has played for Chairman Deng Xiaoping in China and the Sultan of Oman. Tanfield led the Australian String Quartet from 1998 until 2001.

As a soloist Tanfield has appeared with many orchestras; the Philharmonia, City of London Sinfonia, Scottish Chamber Orchestra, Southwest German Radio Symphony Orchestra, and the RAI National Symphony Orchestra in Rome. As concertmaster he has worked with the BBC Philharmonic, RAI National Symphony Orchestra, Southwest German Radio Symphony Orchestra, London Sinfonietta, and the Scottish Chamber Orchestra.

He has performed with Astor Piazolla, Charlie Watts, Pinchas Zukerman, Yehudi Menuhin, Charles Wuorinen, Arvo Pärt, Graeme Koehne, Gary Carr, Carlo Maria Giulini, Mark Gasser and Itzhak Perlman.

From 2008 to 2013 he was Head of Strings at the Western Australian Academy of Performing Arts, and is now Lecturer in Violin at the University of Tasmania.
