= Nicole Lachartre =

French composer and writer

Nicole Marie Lachartre (27 February 1934 – 25 January 1992) was a French composer and writer. She was born in Paris and studied at the Paris Conservatorie with Jean Rivier, Darius Milhaud and André Jolivet. She founded the Association pour la Collaboration des Interprètes et des Compositeurs (ACIC) to facilitate mixed electro-acoustic and instrumental performances. Lachartre published professional articles in journals including Journal of New Music Research and Diagrammes du monde. She died in Versailles.

== Works ==
Lechartre composed for music theater, solo instrument, chamber ensemble, tape and mixed electroacoustic and instrumental music. Selected works include:

- Pottcho I for flute
- Pottcho II for flute
- Music of Musicians Interrupted brass quintet
- Babylone malde, ou la nuit du thermomètre {1981} mini-opéra comique
- Viola Sonata (1964)
- Pianoforte Sonata (1965)
- Suicide cosmique (1970) for tape

Her publications include:

- "Les musiques artificielles." Diagrammes du monde 146 (April 1969): 1-96.
