= Olga Gorelli =

Italian-American pianist and composer

- Born: 14 June 1920; Bologna, Italy
- Died: 18 February 2006 (aged 85); Pennington, New Jersey, USA
- Education: Immaculata College, the Curtis Institute of Music, Smith College, Yale University School of Music
- Occupations: Composer, Pianist

Olga Gorelli (born June 14, 1920 Bologna, Italy, died February 18, 2006) was well known for her musical talents as a composer and pianist.

== Life and career ==
Olga Gorelli, maiden name Gratch, she immigrated to the United States in 1937 with her family and settled in New Jersey. She married a physician, and had two children. She was a resident of Pennington, New Jersey.

Gorelli began composing as a child in Italy and her first little piano pieces were published in Italy when she was ten years old. She pursued her music studies in the U.S., graduating from Immaculata College, the Curtis Institute of Music, Smith College, and the Yale University School of Music, and pursued graduate work at the Eastman School of Music. Her teachers included Rosario Scalero, Gian Carlo Menotti, Quincy Porter, Paul Hindemith, and Darius Milhaud.

Gorelli taught music theory at Hollins College, and piano at Trenton State College. She also taught privately at her home and composed each morning up until the last weeks of her life.

She has written orchestral and choral pieces, many songs for voice with various instruments, a mass, two operas, two dance dramas, and several works for different combinations of strings, brass, and woodwinds.

== Recordings ==
- Rosenfeld, Jayn and Vas, Meg. "The River." By Olga Gorelli. Jersey Sessions, Volume 2. Composers Guild of New Jersey (CGNJ1290), 1990. CD.
- Cervantes, Ana. "Serenade: I Carry Your Heart With Me." By Olga Gorelli. Amore de la Danza. Ana L. Cervantes and John Baker Recordings (CERV1198), December 1998, July 2002. CD.
- Anderson, William and Wolf, Marc. "Paolo e Francesca." By Olga Gorelli. Hausmusik. 20th Century Chamber Music for the Home. Furious Artisans (FACD6802), 2000. Innova (INNOVA310), 2010. CD.
- Anderson, William and Wolf, Marc. "Silent Moon." By Olga Gorelli. Hausmusik. 20th Century Chamber Music for the Home. Furious Artisans (FACD6802), 2000. Innova (INNOVA310), 2010. CD.
- Anderson, William and Wolf, Marc. "Mechanical Man." By Olga Gorelli. Hausmusik. 20th Century Chamber Music for the Home. Furious Artisans (FACD6802), 2000. Innova (INNOVA310), 2010. CD.

== Pedagogical writings ==
- Manual for teaching music skills. Book 1. With songs by Olga Gorelli. Minneapolis, T. S. Denison. 53p. T. S. Denison & Co. Inc. 27 March 1968; Library of Congress record A97B936. Accessed July 5, 2011.
- Manual for teaching music skills. Book 3. With songs by Olga Gorelli. Minneapolis, T. S. Denison. 65 p. T. S. Denison & Co., Inc. 10 Dec 1968; Library of Congress record A35636. Accessed July 5, 2011.
