= Eugene Kurtz =

American classical composer

Eugene Allen Kurtz (December 27, 1923 – July 7, 2006) was an American composer of contemporary classical music.

He received an M.A. in music from the Eastman School of Music in 1949. His instructors included Arthur Honegger, Darius Milhaud, and Max Deutsch. He served as a guest professor of composition at the University of Michigan, the Eastman School of Music, and several other universities. His notable students include John Burke, Roger Briggs, John S. Hilliard, and Robert Morris.

His best-known composition is The Last Contrabass in Las Vegas (1974), for double bass and female narrator, which was composed for Bertram Turetzky and his wife Nancy Turetzky, who have performed it frequently. He was also commissioned by Radio France.

Kurtz was born in Atlanta and served in the U.S. Army during World War II; he first arrived in France in 1944. He settled in Paris in 1952, living there until his death there of a lung infection at the age of 82.
