= Robert DeGaetano =

American concert pianist and composer

Robert DeGaetano (1946-2015) was an American concert pianist and composer.

== Early life and education ==
DeGaetano was born in 1946 in New York City. He studied with Alexis Weissenberg and Sviatoslav Richter. He graduated from The Juilliard School with a Bachelor of Music in 1969, and obtained a Master of Music in Professional Studies in 1971. He also studied with Adele Marcus, Rosina Lhévinne, and a Rotary International scholarship, recommended by Richter and David Oistrakh, made it possible for him to continue studying with Alexis Weissenberg in Paris.

== Career ==
In the mid 1970s DeGaetano made his performing debut in Saint Paul, Minnesota. In 1975 DeGaetano met Samuel Barber as DeGaetano was preparing to perform Barber's piano sonata at Carnegie Hall and they became close friends for the five years that he lived. He has credited Barber for inspiring him to compose, when he visited him in his Santa Cristina chateau in the Dolomites.

During his early career, he taught at the Mannes College of Music, and oversaw a TV program called the 'Walrus Tales'.

It was not until he was in his 30s that he would present his compositions: In 1986, DeGaetano premiered his first Piano Sonata in New York City. The Jackson Symphony Orchestra in Michigan commissioned him to write a piano concerto, his first, which he completed in 1987.

In November 1987, DeGaetano premiered 'The Challenger', a suite for solo piano, which Alice Tully had commissioned him to create as a tribute to the astronauts killed in the 1986 Space Shuttle Challenger disaster. The performance was at the Lincoln Center for the Performing Arts, and family members of the astronauts were present. It was filmed live for television, and was featured on CBS Sunday Morning, as well as broadcast over radio stations around the country. The performance was well received, and was performed on concert tours on three continents.

In 1999 DeGaetano made his first Carnegie Hall appearance. The same year on Memorial Day he played Louis Moreau Gottschalk's 'L'Union' and 'The Banjo' at the Green-Wood Cemetery gravesite of the composer with the Goldman Memorial Band.

DeGaetano has placed his works since the 1990s in a category he called “passionism”. About his 1992 composition 'Crystonix' he said in 2010, that it related to the physical development of the piano over the ages from relatively frail to strong and very resonant. He died on February 12, 2015, in Palm Beach, Florida.

== Discography ==
DeGaetano created nine albums, playing 19th and 20th century composers as well as his own compositions. In September 2013, he released his last album, a recording of his first piano concerto on Navona Records, which is distributed by Naxos Records.
