= Jacqueline Cogdell DjeDje =

American ethnomusicologist

Jacqueline Cogdell DjeDje, an American ethnomusicologist, is emerita Professor of the University of California, Los Angeles (UCLA), former Chair of the UCLA Department of Ethnomusicology (2005–2010), and former Director of the UCLA Ethnomusicology Archive (2000–2007). Her research and publications focus on the music of Africa, Black people in the United States, and the global African diaspora.

== Early life and education ==
DjeDje was born in Jesup, Georgia, not far from the Sea Islands. For her K-12 school education, DjeDje attended public and private institutions with predominantly Black populations: Wayne County Training School (grades 1–9) and Boggs Academy (grades 10–12), a boarding school in Keysville, Burke County, Georgia. Her training in music began when she took piano lessons from teachers in her local community. In addition to providing piano accompaniment (playing hymns, gospel, and spirituals) for church activities, choirs, and other cultural events locally, she accompanied music groups at her schools. She received additional formal training in piano at Boggs.

For her undergraduate education, DjeDje attended Fisk University, a historically Black university in Nashville, Tennessee, where she studied piano with Anne Gamble Kennedy and was introduced to the field of ethnomusicology through the teachings of Darius Thieme. After receiving her BA degree in music from Fisk in 1970, she pursued graduate studies in music at UCLA, specializing in ethnomusicology with a focus on African and African American music, and completed her PhD degree in 1978. At UCLA, not only did she study with J. H. Kwabena Nketia, the advisor for her research on African music, she worked closely with other faculty in the Program of Ethnomusicology.

== Career ==
In 1975, DjeDje began her college teaching career in music at Tuskegee University (formerly Tuskegee Institute) before accepting a position at UCLA in fall 1979 where she remained until she retired in spring 2013. In addition to theoretical courses in ethnomusicology, she taught courses in world music, African and African American music and was founding director of the UCLA African American vocal ensemble. DjeDje served as interim chair of UCLA's Department of Ethnomusicology (winter-spring 2003), Department chair (fall 2005-fall 2010), and Director of the UCLA Ethnomusicology Archive (2000–2007).

== Major works and contributions ==
Although many of DjeDje's publications focus on fiddling both in West Africa and among Blacks in the United States, she has produced works on other topics: religious music, diaspora studies, women and music, pre-20th century Black music, and regional studies. One of the reviewers of California Soul, a book co-edited by DjeDje and Eddie S. Meadows, comments on the importance of examining under-researched areas: “Most regional works on African American music and culture focus on the South, North, and Midwest. In contrast, this pioneering collection looks at the culturally complex, racially/ethnically diverse, and geographically expansive state of California with its enduring image as the golden land of greater freedom and opportunity.” Making her findings accessible to a diverse audience, particularly the community that was its source, is important in DjeDje's research. A reviewer of the book, Fiddling in West Africa, notes: “Beyond her systematic organization of an enormous amount of material, both in terms of research years and regional diversity, DjeDje’s writing style is fluid and accessible. The text never recedes into dry academic writing.”

== Awards and honors ==
In 1970, DjeDje was awarded a Ford Foundation doctoral fellowship to pursue post-graduate studies. She “is a two-time award recipient from the National Endowment for the Humanities and has received distinguished service and contribution awards from the Los Angeles Chapter of the Gospel Music Workshop of America, the Mu Beta Omega Chapter and Ivy Philanthropic Foundation of Alpha Kappa Alpha Sorority, Incorporated, and the Los Angeles Music Award from the Cultural Affairs Department of the City of Los Angeles.” To acknowledge her service to the field, in 2020 she was selected to be an Honorary Member of the Society for Ethnomusicology, and for the 70th Annual Meeting of SEM in 2025, she was chosen to present the Charles Seeger Lecture, the centerpiece of the Society's annual meeting.

== Selected publications ==
=== Books and articles (single-authored) ===
- DjeDje, Jacqueline Cogdell (1978). American Black Spiritual and Gospel Songs from Southeast Georgia: A Comparative Study. Los Angeles: UCLA Center for Afro-American Studies.
- DjeDje, Jacqueline Cogdell (1980). Distribution of the One String Fiddle in West Africa. Los Angeles: UCLA Program in Ethnomusicology Monograph Series.
- DjeDje, Jacqueline Cogdell (Fall 1982). "The Concept of Patronage: An Examination of Hausa and Dagomba One-String Fiddle Traditions". Journal of African Studies. 9 (3): 116–127.
- DjeDje, Jacqueline Cogdell (Fall 1983). "An Expression of Black Identity: The Use of Gospel Music in a Los Angeles Catholic Church". The Western Journal of Black Studies. 7 (3): 148–160.
- DjeDje, Jacqueline Cogdell (Autumn 1984). "Song Type and Performance Practice in Hausa and Dagomba Possession (Bori) Music". The Black Perspective in Music. 12 (2): 166–182. doi:10.2307/1215020.
- DjeDje, Jacqueline Cogdell (1998). "Remembering Kojo: History, Music, and Gender in the January Sixth Celebration of the Jamaican Accompong Maroons". Black Music Research Journal. 18 (1/2, Spring/Fall): 67–120. doi:10.2307/779395.
- DjeDje, Jacqueline Cogdell (2008). Fiddling in West Africa: Touching the Spirit in Fulbe, Hausa, and Dagbamba Cultures. Bloomington: Indiana University Press.
- DjeDje, Jacqueline Cogdell (2008). Fiddling in West Africa (1950s–1990s): The Songbook. Los Angeles: UCLA Ethnomusicology Publications.
- DjeDje, Jacqueline Cogdell (Spring 2011). "Special Issue: Music of Black Los Angeles". Black Music Research Journal. 31 (1). University of Illinois Press.
- DjeDje, Jacqueline Cogdell (February 2016). "The (Mis)Representation of African American Music: The Role of the Fiddle". Journal of the Society for American Music. 10 (1): 1–32.
- DjeDje, Jacqueline Cogdell (2020). "Appalachian Black Fiddling: History and Creativity" (PDF). African Music: Journal of the International Library of African Music. 11 (2): 77–101.
- DjeDje, Jacqueline Cogdell (May 22, 2024). "African Music in the Global African Diaspora". The Oxford Research Encyclopedia of African History. Oxford University Press. doi:10.1093/acrefore/9780190277734.013.924.
- DjeDje, Jacqueline Cogdell (2025). Fiddling Is My Joy: The Fiddle in African American Culture. Jackson, Mississippi: University Press of Mississippi.
- DjeDje, Jacqueline Cogdell (2025). Fiddling Is My Joy Companion: The Fiddle in African American Culture. Jackson, Mississippi: University Press of Mississippi.

=== Edited books ===
- DjeDje, Jacqueline Cogdell (editor), and William G. Carter (associate editor). African Musicology: Current Trends, Volume 1. A Festschrift Presented to J. H. Kwabena Nketia. Los Angeles and Atlanta: UCLA African Studies Center and African Arts Magazine and Crossroads Press/African Studies Association, 1989.
- DjeDje (editor). African Musicology: Current Trends, Volume 2. A Festschrift Presented to J. H. Kwabena Nketia. Los Angeles and Atlanta: UCLA International Studies and Overseas Program (ISOP)/The James S. Coleman African Studies Center and African Studies Association Press, 1992.
- DjeDje and Eddie S. Meadows (co-editors). California Soul: Music of African Americans in the West. Berkeley: University of California Press, 1998.
- DjeDje (editor). Turn Up the Volume! A Celebration of African Music. Los Angeles: UCLA Fowler Museum of Cultural History, 1999. Turn up the volume! : a celebration of African music

=== Recordings ===
- DjeDje, Jacqueline Cogdell (compiler and author of liner notes). Black American Religious Music from Southeast Georgia. Folkways Records FS 34010, 1983. Black American Religious Music from Southeast Georgia; Spotify – Web Player
- DjeDje (compiler and author of liner notes). Fiddling in West Africa (1950s–1990s): The Recording. Ethnomusicology @ UCLA Archive Series, Volume 2, EUCLA CD 2, 2007. Fiddling in West Africa (1950s-1990s): The CD Recording, Ethnomusicology Archive Series Vol. 2
