= Michel Decoust =

French composer and conductor

Michel Decoust (born 19 November 1936) is a French composer and conductor.

== Biography ==
Decoust was born in born Paris on 19 November 1936. He studied from 1956 to 1965 with Jean Rivier and Darius Milhaud at the Paris Conservatoire, as well as at the Cologne Courses for New Music in 1964–65, with Pierre Boulez and Karlheinz Stockhausen. He also studied orchestral conducting in 1965 with Boulez in Basel.

In 1967 he taught composition at the Dartington College Summer Courses. He served as regional musical organizer for the Orchestre Philharmonique des Pays de la Loire from 1967 to 1970, and from 1970 to 1972 directed musical activities at the Maison de la Culture of Rennes and Nevers. He founded and directed the Pantin Conservatoire Municipal de Musique from 1972 to 1976, and was director of education at IRCAM from 1976 to 1979. He was vice-chair of the symphonic music committee of the French composer's union SACEM from 1979 to 1992.

He has been awarded the Prix de Rome, the Ambron International Composition Prize, and a Besançon International Competition conducting prize.

== Compositions (selective list) ==
- Horizon remarquable (René Char), for soprano and orchestra (1964)
- Distorsion, for 3 flutes (1965)
- Mobile, for percussion (1965)
- Polymorphie, for orchestra (1967)
- Et/ou, for from 1–44 pianos (1972)
- 7.854.693.286, for 8-track tape (1972)
- L'application des lectrices aux champs, for soprano and orchestra (1977)
- Onde, for brass quintet (1982)
- Olos, for tenor saxophone and electronics (1983)
- Les galeries de pierres, for solo viola (1984)
- Sun for solo viola (or violin) and 12 string instruments (1971)
- Symétrie, for winds and percussion (1986)
- Marbres, for 4-track tape (1986)
- Sept chansons érotiques, for soprano and piano (1986)
- Le temps d'écrite, for piano (1988–92)
- A jamais d'ombre, for voice and string quartet (1996)
- Cent phrases pour éventail (Paul Claudel), for six voices and instrumental ensemble (1996)
