= Macfarren =

Macfarren is a surname. Notable people with the surname include:

- Emma Maria Macfarren (1824–1895), English pianist and composer, sister-in-law of George Alexander Macfarren
- George Macfarren (1788–1843), English dramatist
- George Alexander Macfarren (1813–1887), English composer, son of George Macfarren
- Natalia Macfarren (1827–1916), singer and music translator, wife of George Alexander Macfarren
- Walter Cecil Macfarren (1826–1905), pianist and composer, brother of George Alexander Macfarren, and in whose name the Royal Academy of Music prize is awarded
