= Llewela Davies =

Welsh pianist and composer

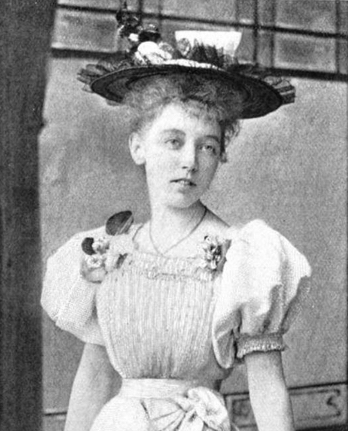
Welsh pianist and composer Llewela Davies, c. 1896, in a flowery hat and gown.

Llewela Davies (February 1871 – 22 August 1952) was a Welsh pianist and composer who toured with Dame Nellie Melba.

== Early life and education ==
Llewela Tegwedd Davies was born at Talgarth, near Brecon, in South Wales. Her father was Rhys Davies, a justice of the peace. At age 10 she won a medal and a cash prize at the National Eisteddfod, and earned a scholarship to attend the North London Collegiate School for Girls.

She attended the Royal Academy of Music on a John Thomas Welsh scholarship awarded in 1887, and as a student there won many awards for composition and musicianship, including the "Worshipful Company of Musicians Medal for the Most Distinguished Student in the Academy." As a pianist Llewela Davies was often an accompanist for student vocal recitals during her college years. She later earned a music degree from London University.

Her instructor at the Royal Academy, Walter Macfarren, was the brother of composer George Alexander Macfarren and brother-in-law of composer Emma Maria Macfarren; his other students included notable musicians Ethel Mary Boyce, Dora Bright, Stewart Macpherson and Agnes Zimmermann.

== Career ==
Llewela Davies' most prominent performances were with Nellie Melba; Davies and her husband toured with the singer, though North America, Australia, and New Zealand. She performed twice at the Three Choirs Festival, and as a pianist at the National Eisteddfod. She also performed at the Annual Reid Concert in Edinburgh in 1899. She was welcomed in Welsh villages as a guest performer at special events.

Davies taught at London University after earning her degree there. Later in life she was a professor of piano at Guildhall School of Music. Her compositions include Three Sketches (for orchestra), a string quartet, and a Violin Sonata in E (1894).

== Personal life ==
Miss Davies married fellow Welsh musician Frederic Griffith (or Griffiths) in 1898, and lived in London thereafter. She was widowed when Frederic Griffith died in 1917. She died in London in 1952 at the age of 81.
