= Oliveria Prescott =

English writer and composer

Oliveria Louisa Prescott (3 September 1842 – 9 September 1919) was an English writer and composer.

== Biography ==
Oliveria Prescott was born in London, the daughter of Frederick Joseph Prescott and Elizabeth Oliveria Russell. She studied with Lindsay Sloper and then at the Royal Academy of Music under George Alexander Macfarren. She became Macfarren's amenuensis.

She lectured in harmony and composition for Newnham College, Cambridge, and also taught harmony at the High School for Girls in Baker Street, London. She died in London.

== Works ==
Prescott composed several overtures, a piano concerto, shorter orchestral pieces, vocal and choral works and two symphonies.

In 1876 Prescott's first symphony in B-flat “Alkestis” won third prize in a competition for new British symphonies that was held at the Alexandra Palace in north London. In that competition Charles Villiers Stanford's first symphony in B-flat took second place, while Francis William Davenport's symphony in D-minor was placed first. A total of 38 symphonies had been submitted to the competition.

Selected works include:

=== Stage ===
- Carrigraphuga, The Castle of the Fairies, musical comedy in three acts (1914), words by S. Phillips

=== Keyboard ===
- Concert Finale, pianoforte duet (1878)

=== Choral ===
- "A Border Ballad", four-part song (1844), words by Francis William Bourdillon
- Lord Ullin's Daughter, choral ballad (1869), after Lord Ullin's Daughter by Thomas Campbell
- "Song of Waterspirits" four-part song (1874), words by E. Evans
- The Righteous Life for Evermore, anthem for four voices (1876)
- "The Ballad of Young John and his True Sweetheart", part song (1878)
- "The Douglas Raid", four-part song (1883), words by J. Stewart
- "The Huntsman", four-part song (1883), words by J. Stewart
- "Equestrian Courtship", part song (1885), words by T. Hood
- "Say Not, the Struggle Nought Availeth", part song (1885), words by A. H. Clough

=== Song ===
- "There Is for Every Day a Bliss" (1873), words by J. W. H.
- "Ask Me No More", with violoncello obbligato (1874), after The Princess by Alfred, Lord Tennyson
- "Cheerio!", marching song for whistlers and singing (1915), words by S. Phillips
