= 1864 in music =

== Events ==
- January 13 – American songwriter Stephen Foster ("Oh! Susanna", "Old Folks at Home") dies aged 37 in New York City leaving a scrap of paper reading "Dear friends and gentle hearts". His parlor song "Beautiful Dreamer" is published in March.
- February 24 – Bedřich Smetana's symphonic poem Hakon Jarl is premiered in Prague.
- February 29 – Composer Gioachino Rossini celebrates his 72nd (17th) birthday with a party. It is 32 years since his last opera.
- May – Richard Wagner meets his new patron, the young Ludwig II of Bavaria, in Munich.
- December 17 – Jacques Offenbach's operetta La Belle Hélène receives its first performance at the Paris Variétés
- Hans von Bülow takes over from Franz Lachner at the Munich opera.
- Mili Balakirev begins sketching his Symphony No. 1. It will not be performed till 1898.

== Published popular music ==
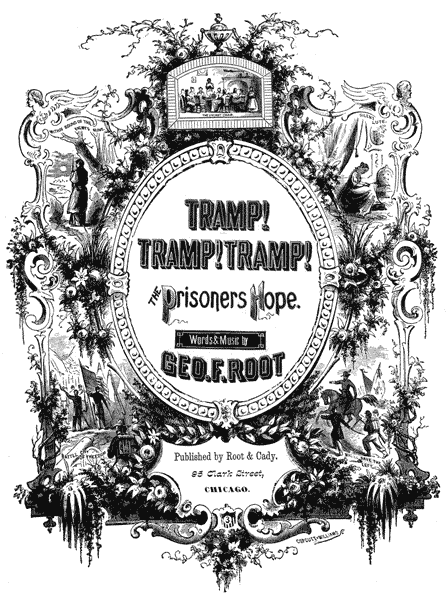
Cover of the 1864 publication of the sheet music of "Tramp! Tramp! Tramp!"

- "Beautiful Dreamer" by Stephen Foster
- "Der Deitcher's Dog" ("O Where, O Where Has My Little Dog Gone?") by Septimus Winner
- "The Picture on the Wall" by Henry Clay Work
- "Pretty Polly Perkins of Paddington Green" w. Harry Clifton m. traditional?
- "Shall We Gather at the River?" w.m. Robert Lowry
- "Somebody's Darling" w.m. John Hill Hewitt
- "Tramp! Tramp! Tramp! (The Boys Are Marching)" by George F. Root

== Classical music ==
- Gaetano Braga – Souvenir du Rhin
- Johannes Brahms
  - 9 Lieder and Songs, Op.32
  - Piano Quintet Op. 34
- Anton Bruckner
  - Mass No.1 in D minor, WAB 26
  - Herbstlied, WAB 73
  - Um Mitternacht, WAB 89
- Aleksandr Dargomyzhsky – Kazachok
- Félicien David – Allegretto agitato
- Niels Gade – 3 Fantasie pieces for clarinet and piano, Op. 43
- Hermann Goetz – Frühlings-Ouvertüre, Op.15
- Louis Gottschalk – The Dying Poet
- Ferdinand Hiller
  - Operette ohne Text, Op.106
  - 12 Lieder (Hiller Album), Op.111
- Salomon Jadassohn – Symphony No.2, Op.28
- Adolf Jensen
  - Präludium und Romanze, Op.19
  - 7 Gesänge aus dem spanischen Liederbuche, Op.21
  - 6 Lieder, Op.24
  - Piano Sonata, Op.25
- Friedrich Kiel – Piano Concerto
- Heinrich Lichner – 3 Piano Sonatas, Op.4
- William Mason – Ballade et barcarole, Op.15
- Josef Rheinberger – 5 Motets, Op.40
- Gioachino Rossini – Petite messe solennelle
- Ernst Rudorff – String Sextet, Op.5
- Camille Saint-Saëns – Piano Trio No.1, Op.18
- Franz Strauss – Nocturno for Horn and Piano
- Peter Tchaikovsky – The Storm
- Thomas Tellefsen – Trio for piano, violin and cello (Opus 31)
- Stanislas Verroust – Solo de concert No.11, Op.85
- Pauline Viardot – 12 Poems by Pushkin, Fet and Turgenev
- Robert Volkmann – Symphony no. 2
- Władysław Żeleński
  - Valse-caprice, Op.9
  - 2 Morceaux de salon, Op.11

== Opera ==
- Daniel François Esprit Auber – La fiancée du roi de Garbe (premiered January 11 in Paris)
- Flor van Duyse – Rosalinde (libretto by Karel Versnaeyen, premiered in Antwerp)
- Charles Gounod - Mireille, opera premiered on March 19, in Paris
- Karel Miry – Bouchard-d'Avesnes (opera in 5 acts, libretto by Hippoliet van Peene, premiered on March 6 in Ghent)
- Jacques Offenbach – Die Rheinnixen (The Rhine Fairies)
- George Alexander Macfarren – Helvellyn, (opera in 4 acts, libretto by John Oxenford, premiered on November 3 in London)

== Musical theatre ==
- La Belle Hélène (Lyrics: Henri Meilhac & Ludovic Halévy Music: Jacques Offenbach) opens at the Théâtre des Variétés, Paris, on December 17.

== Births ==
- February 6 – John Henry Mackay, lyricist (died 1933)
- February 7
  - Ricardo Castro, Mexican concert pianist and composer (d. 1907)
  - Arthur Collins, singer (d. 1933)
- February 9 – Miina Härma, Estonian organist, composer, and conductor (d. 1941)
- March 12 – Alice Tegnér, organist, composer (d. 1943)
- March 18 – Giorgio M. Sulli, conductor, composer, and voice teacher (d. 1918)
- April 10 – Eugen d'Albert, composer, pianist (d. 1932)
- May 23 – Louis Glass, composer (d. 1936)
- June 11 – Richard Strauss, composer, conductor (d. 1949)
- June 30 – William Lavin, tenor (d. 1933)
- July 6 – Alberto Nepomuceno, composer and conductor (d. 1920)
- July 20 – Erik Axel Karlfeldt, lyricist (died 1931)
- August 18 – Gemma Bellincioni, operatic soprano (d. 1950)
- October 7 – Louis F. Gottschalk, composer (d. 1934)
- date unknown – Alice Esty, operatic soprano (d. 1935)

== Deaths ==
- January 13 – Stephen Foster, songwriter (b. 1826)
- January 15 – Isaac Nathan, English-born composer and musicologist, "father of Australian music" (b. c.1791)
- January 26 – Otto Lindblad, composer (b. 1809)
- February 16 – Václav Jindřich Veit, lawyer and composer (b. 1806)
- March 30 – Louis Schindelmeisser, clarinettist, conductor and composer (b. 1811)
- May 2 – Giacomo Meyerbeer, composer (b. 1791)
- June 3 – Anna Maria Sessi, opera singer (b. 1790)
- July 28 – Johann Hermann Kufferath, composer (born 1797)
- August 13 – Berthold Sigismund, lyricist (born 1819)
- September 4 – Manuel Antonio Carreño, Venezuelan musician, teacher and diplomat (b. 1812)
- October 1 – Christian Friedrich Ludwig Buschmann, musical instrument maker (b. 1805)
- October 7 – Apollon Grigoryev, poet and songwriter (b. 1822) (alcoholism)
- December 20 – Josef Proksch, pianist and composer (b. 1794)
