= Stewart Macpherson =

English musician of Scottish descent (1865–1941)

(Charles) Stewart Macpherson (29 March 1865 – 27 March 1941) was an English musician of Scottish descent. He was born in Liverpool, and studied at the Royal Academy of Music in London with both George Alexander Macfarren and Walter Cecil Macfarren. Macpherson was the organist at Immanuel and St Andrew Church in Streatham, and a conductor of various choral and orchestral societies, including (from 1885 until 1902) the Westminster Orchestral Society.

In 1887 he joined the RAM staff, teaching harmony and composition. He was professor of composition at the Royal Normal College for the Blind from 1903 until 1921. With help from Ernest Read and Percy Scholes he founded the Music Teachers' Association in 1908, and was its chairman until 1923. From 1924 to 1927, he was dean of the Faculty of Music in the University of London. His notable students included violinist John Waterhouse, pianist Winifred Christie and violinist and composer Susan Spain-Dunk.

Macpherson was primarily a music educator, and is remembered for such textbooks as Practical Harmony (1894), Form in Music (1908), and Melody and Harmony (1920). He was a pioneer of music appreciation as a broader element of technical training. His book Music and its Appreciation (1910) was the first on the subject to be published. Macpherson was also an Associated Board examiner, travelling to Canada, Australia, New Zealand and South Africa.

A composer in his earlier years, Macpherson wrote a Symphony in C (1889), a Concertstück for pianoforte and orchestra (1893), a Mass in D (1898), and a Concerto alla fantasia for violin and orchestra (first performed at the Proms on 4 August 1904 with Spencer Dyke, soloist). Other works include a Ballade and Notturno (both for orchestra), a Romance for oboe and piano, the Suite de Valses for piano, and various songs, part songs and church music. Macpherson won the Charles Lucas Medal for composition in 1884.

Macpherson lived at Burley Cottage, Burkes Road in Beaconsfield, Buckinghamshire. He retired from the Royal Academy in 1931. He died in London on 27 March 1941, aged 75.

== Writings ==
- Practical Harmony (1894)
- Practical Counterpoint (1900)
- The Rudiments of Music (1903)
- Questions and Exercises upon the Rudiments of Music (1907)
- Form in Music (1908)
- Music and its Appreciation: Or the Foundations of True Listening (1910)
- The Appreciative Aspects of Music-Study (1910)
- Studies in Phrasing and Form (1911)
- Modern Ideas in the Teaching of Harmony (1912)
- Aural Culture based upon Musical Appreciation (1912–1921, with Ernest Read)
- Analytical Edition: Beethoven's Piano Sonatas (1913, pub. Joseph Williams)
- Ear-Training and the Teaching of the Minor Mode (1913)
- The Musical Education of the Child (1915)
- Melody and Harmony (1920)
- The Appreciation Class (1923)
- Studies in the Art of Counterpoint (1928)
- A Simple Introduction to the Principles of Tonality (1929)
- First Steps in Musicianship (1934, with Hilda Collens)
- A Commentary on ... the Forty-Eight Preludes and Fugues of Johann Sebastian Bach (1934–1937)
- Cameos of Musical History (1937)
