= Natalia Macfarren =

English musician, composer and music translator (1827 – 1916)

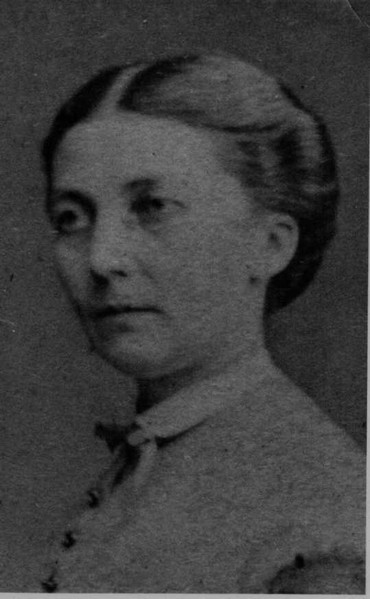
- Born: Clarina Thalia Andrae; 1827; Lübeck
- Died: 1916 (aged 88–89); Bakewell
- Occupations: Contralto singer Pianist and piano teacher Music translator
- Known for: Translations of operas into English
- Spouse: George Alexander Macfarren
- Children: Clarina Thalia Macfarren (m. Francis William Davenport)

Natalia Macfarren (née Clarina Thalia Andrae, 1827 – 1916) was a German-English contralto singer and music translator. She produced influential translations of Italian and German musical texts such as choral music and opera into English from the 1870s to the 1890s, sometimes introducing them to the English-speaking world for the first time. She is particularly noted for her translations of operatic works, especially those by Wagner.

== Life ==
She was born Clarina Thalia Andrae in Lübeck in 1827 to a German bandmaster who became attached to an English regiment after moving the family to England in the 1830s.

In September 1841, she entered the Royal Academy of Music as a pianist and contralto. She married one of her instructors, composer George Alexander Macfarren, on 27 September 1844. They had a daughter.

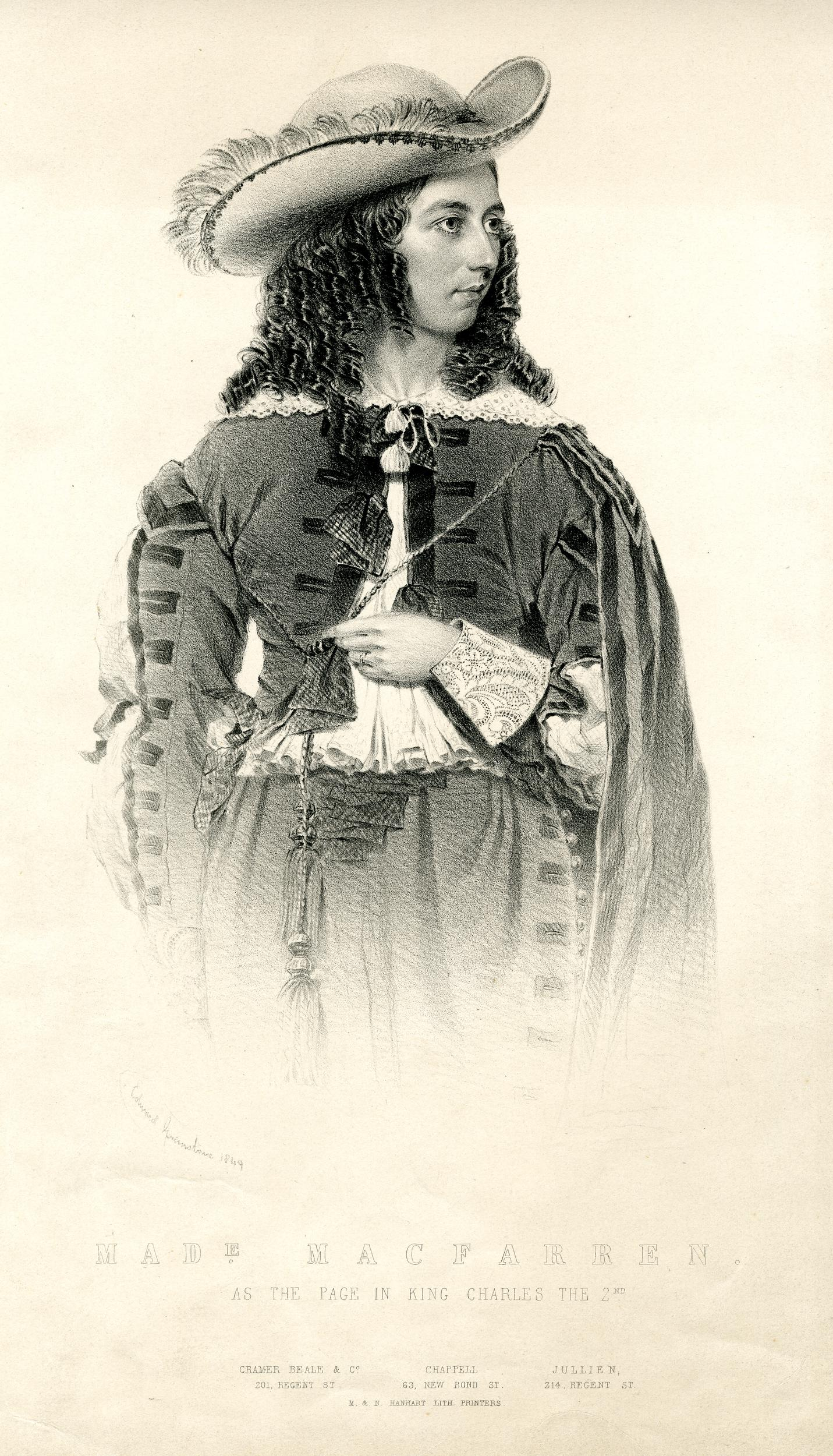
Macfarren as the Page in King Charles II. 1849 lithograph by Edward Grimstone

Her operatic debut came in 1849 when she appeared in the first performance of her husband’s opera King Charles II. Her short performing career also included appearing as a soloist in the 1850–1 season of the Anacreontic Society.

She then turned her attention to teaching and translation. In 1868 she published an Elementary Course for Vocalizing and Pronouncing the English Language. One of her pupils was Gilbert and Sullivan performer Alice Barnett.

== Translation ==
One of Macfarren's translations for Novello

Natalia Macfarren began translating music for Novello and Company in 1869. She selected and adapted songs for Novello's catalogue of choral and instrumental music. When they began an operatic series in 1871, she was selected as their translator, sometimes also working as editor, for works in German and Italian. She was one of the first translators to introduce the works of Wagner to an English-speaking audience, including Lohengrin (1872) and Tannhäuser (1873).

Macfarren often translated the works of deceased artists, allowing her freedom in her approach. Although she corresponded with Edvard Grieg to get his approval of her translations, he was not impressed with her work; however, Max Bruch praised and continued to use her as a translator.

Although her translations sometimes contained archaisms or suffered from a lack of proofreading, they were praised for their accuracy and flair, and Pierre Degott credits them with making 'enormous impact…in the advancement and development of the operatic form in the English-speaking world.'

Outside of the operatic form, she was a translator and early supporter of Adolf Bernhard Marx, and her translations of Brahms' Lieder proved influential on later English versions. She also translated works of musical non-fiction such as Eduard Devrient's My Recollections of Felix Mendelssohn-Bartholdy.

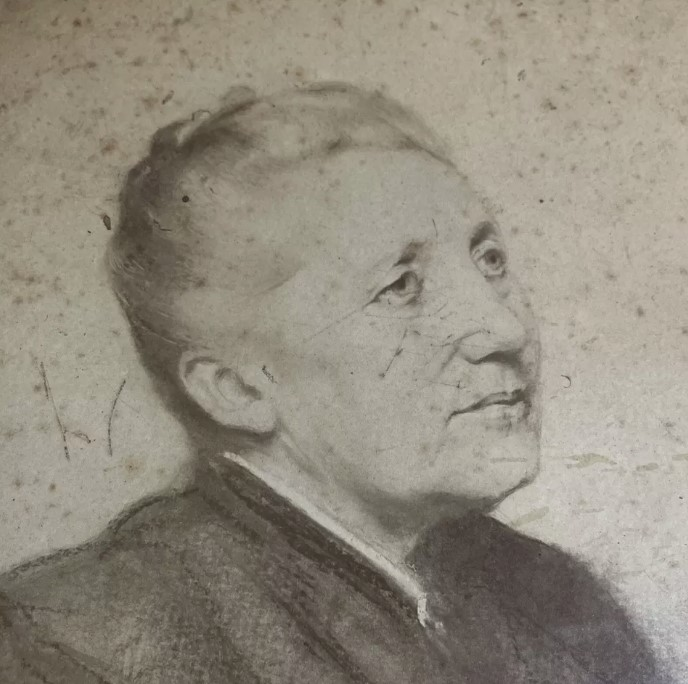
Natalia Macfarren in 1905.

=== Operas translated ===
- The Barber of Seville
- The Bartered Bride
- Der Freischütz
- Don Giovanni
- Fidelio
- I Puritani
- Il Trovatore
- La Sonnambula
- La Traviata
- Lucia di Lammermoor
- The Magic Flute
- The Marriage of Figaro
- Martha
- Norma
- Oberon
- Rigoletto

== Folk music ==
Natalia disseminated English and Czech folk songs, collaborating with John Oxenford on a two-volume selection of William Chappell's Popular Music of the Olden Time, published as Old English Ditties. Unlike her conservative approach to translation, Macfarren and Oxenford would sometimes alter the lyrics to these folk songs if they believed they could be improved. She also translated Dvořák's Czech Gypsy Songs (from the German).

== Death ==
She died in Bakewell on 9 April 1916.
