= Alfred Day (music theorist) =

Alfred Day (1810 – 11 February 1849) was an English homeopath and music theorist, known for his book A Treatise on Harmony, published in 1845.

== Life ==
Day was born in London in January 1810. Though showing very strong musical tastes, in accordance with his father's wishes he studied medicine in London and Paris, and, after taking a medical degree at Heidelberg, settled in London in practice as a homeopath. For several years he devoted himself during his leisure hours to maturing a plan which he had conceived for forming a complete and logical theory of harmony out of the existing mass of isolated and often inconsistent rules.

The results of his study were published in 1845 as A Treatise on Harmony. In almost every branch of the scientific basis of music Day proposed some reform. The work was unfavourably received, though its originality attracted the attention of a few scientific musicians.

In a review of the work, George French Flowers wrote:

The Treatise on Harmony ... proposes an entirely new theory of music, professing to distinguish between the artificial principles upon which the earliest composers wrote, and the natural feelings from the dictates of which the greatest beauties of the modern school have been produced.... With these ambitious pretensions the work is, at least, worthy the careful examination of all who are interested in the advancement of the arts; but it is at the same time exposed to the prejudices arising from the wilful tenacity of old and habitual notions....

George Alexander Macfarren adopted much of Day's theory, and mainly by his advocacy the work became a recognised authority on many of the subjects of which it treats. He resigned from the Royal Academy of Music in 1847 when his attachment to Day's work was questioned. Macfarren published a second edition of the Treatise in 1885; in the preface, he wrote:

The speciality of the treatise is twofold: firstly, the standard laws of the ancient, strict, diatonic, artificial, or contrapuntal style are collected and systematically codified ... and they are distinguished entirely from those of the modern, free, chromatic, natural, or harmonic style; secondly, though the natural chord of the dominant seventh had been more or less freely used for ... three and a half centuries prior to the appearance of this book … no systematic principles of fundamental harmony had ever been deduced from the phenomena that bring that remarkable chord within the resources of the musician....

Day's ideas were described in some detail by Hubert Parry in A Dictionary of Music and Musicians (1900).

Day died of heart disease, after a long illness, on 11 February 1849.
