= Annette A. Aguilar =

American drummer

- Born: June 28; San Francisco, California, U.S.
- Genres: Latin jazz, Brazilian jazz, Reggae
- Occupation(s): Instrumentalist, Bandleader, Instructor
- Instrument: Percussion
- Years active: 1973–present
- Labels: Eagle Seeks Salmon

Annette A. Aguilar (born June 28, 1957) is an American Nicaraguan percussionist, bandleader, and music educator. She is best known as the leader of the Latin jazz-Brazilian jazz band Annette A. Aguilar & StringBeans, which has toured extensively in the United States and Africa.

She is the founder of the annual Women in Latin Jazz Festival in New York City, and is also a Latin Jazz Ambassador for the U.S. State Department.

== Early life and education ==
Born in San Francisco to Nicaraguan parents, Aguilar began playing the drums in sixth grade after seeing the Beatles on television. She started with drum set and hand percussion lessons at a summer workshop, and later took up the snare drum. In her teens, influenced by the San Francisco music scene, and especially Santana, she began to play Latin rock. By sixteen she was performing with well-known artists such as José Areas (formerly of Santana), Cal Tjader, and Sheila Escovedo ("Sheila E.").

While an undergraduate studying classical music at San Francisco State University, she played for both a Latin-Brazilian jazz group and the Bay Area Women's Philharmonic. She earned a master's degree in music from the Manhattan School of Music and a master's degree in music education at the City University of New York. She also studied Latin music with Louis Bauzo at Boys Harbor Conservatory, and with Jerry Gonzalez.

== Career ==
In 1981 she joined Casselberry-DuPreé, an all-female reggae band consisting of Judith Casselberry, Jaqué DuPreé, and Toshi Reagon (daughter of Bernice Reagon). She moved with the band to New York City in 1985 and played on their album City Down, which was produced by Linda Tillery and won a NAIRD award for Best Reggae Album of 1986. The band toured Europe, where it was better known than in the U.S. She was also a founding member of the San Francisco-based band, Chevere.

In 1992 she formed her own Latin and Brazilian jazz band, Annette A. Aguilar & StringBeans, named for its use of string instruments, including violin and harp. The band is known for its distinctive blend of styles, drawing on Aguilar's diverse influences. They soon became popular in New York's Lower East Side and East Village. Since then the band has released three albums, and has played at the Kennedy Center, Jazz at Lincoln Center, and many other venues in the U.S. and abroad. They have been selected three times as Latin Jazz Ambassadors by the U.S. State Department as part of its "Rhythm Road" cultural exchange program, traveling to South Africa, Rwanda, Swaziland, Ethiopia, Kenya, Tanzania, Zanzibar, and Madagascar. In Madagascar they played for the president, Marc Ravalomanana.

Aguilar has played percussion with many notable artists including Tito Puente, Stevie Wonder, and The Grateful Dead. She has performed in Broadway shows including Streetcorner Symphony, The Capeman, and the Grammy-winning Smokey Joe's Cafe.

In addition to performing, she teaches percussion at the Third Street Music School Settlement in New York. In 2014 she organized the first annual Women in Latin Jazz Festival in Upper Manhattan.

== Discography ==
=== Casselberry-DuPreé ===
- City Down, Icebergg Records, 1986
- Hot Corn in the Fire, Ladyslipper, 1994

=== Annette A. Aguilar & StringBeans ===
- Special Friends, Eagle Seeks Salmon, 1999
- No Cheap Dates, Eagle Seeks Salmon, 2005
- The Day Waits for Nobody, Eagle Seeks Salmon, 2009
