= Ethel Mary Boyce =

English composer, pianist and teacher

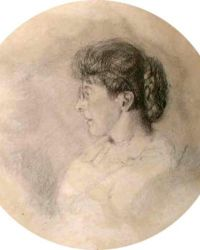
Portrait of Ethel Mary Boyce

Ethel Mary Boyce (5 October 1863 – 3 March 1936) was an English composer, pianist and teacher.

Boyce was born and resided in Chertsey, Surrey, daughter of Justice of the peace George Boyce (1832–1914). She studied piano at the Royal Academy of Music with Walter Cecil Macfarren and composition with Francis William Davenport. The prizes she won include the Cipriani Potter Exhibition Prize and the Sterndale Bennett Prize for piano playing (both in 1886) and the Charles Lucas Medal for composition in 1889. In 1890 she was appointed associate of the Royal Academy, becoming a composition teacher in 1891, when she gave up public performances as a pianist.

Boyce was at one time the fiancée of Edward German, but the engagement was broken off and German never married. She played piano duets with Dora Bright, including a concert performance of Bright's Variations on an Original Theme of Sir G. A. Macfarren, named for George Alexander Macfarren, their teacher's brother.

Her compositions include an orchestral March in E (1889), the Introduction and Rondo for piano, violin and cello (which won her the Lucas prize, also in 1889), eight pieces for violin and piano (published by Novello) and various miniatures for piano, including A Book of Fancies, To Phylis (four short pieces), The Silver Thames (three piano pieces published by Augener in 1922), the Valse in F (published by Ashdown) and Songs and Dances for the Piano (published by Curwen). She also wrote children's piano music, songs and choral works including several cantatas with medieval subjects: The Lay of the Brown Rosary (1890), setting Elizabeth Barrett Browning, Young Lochinvar (1891), setting Walter Scott, and The Sands of Corriemie for female voices (1895), with both libretto and music by the composer.
