= Helvellyn (opera) =

Opera by George Alexander Macfarren

- Opera by George Alexander Macfarren
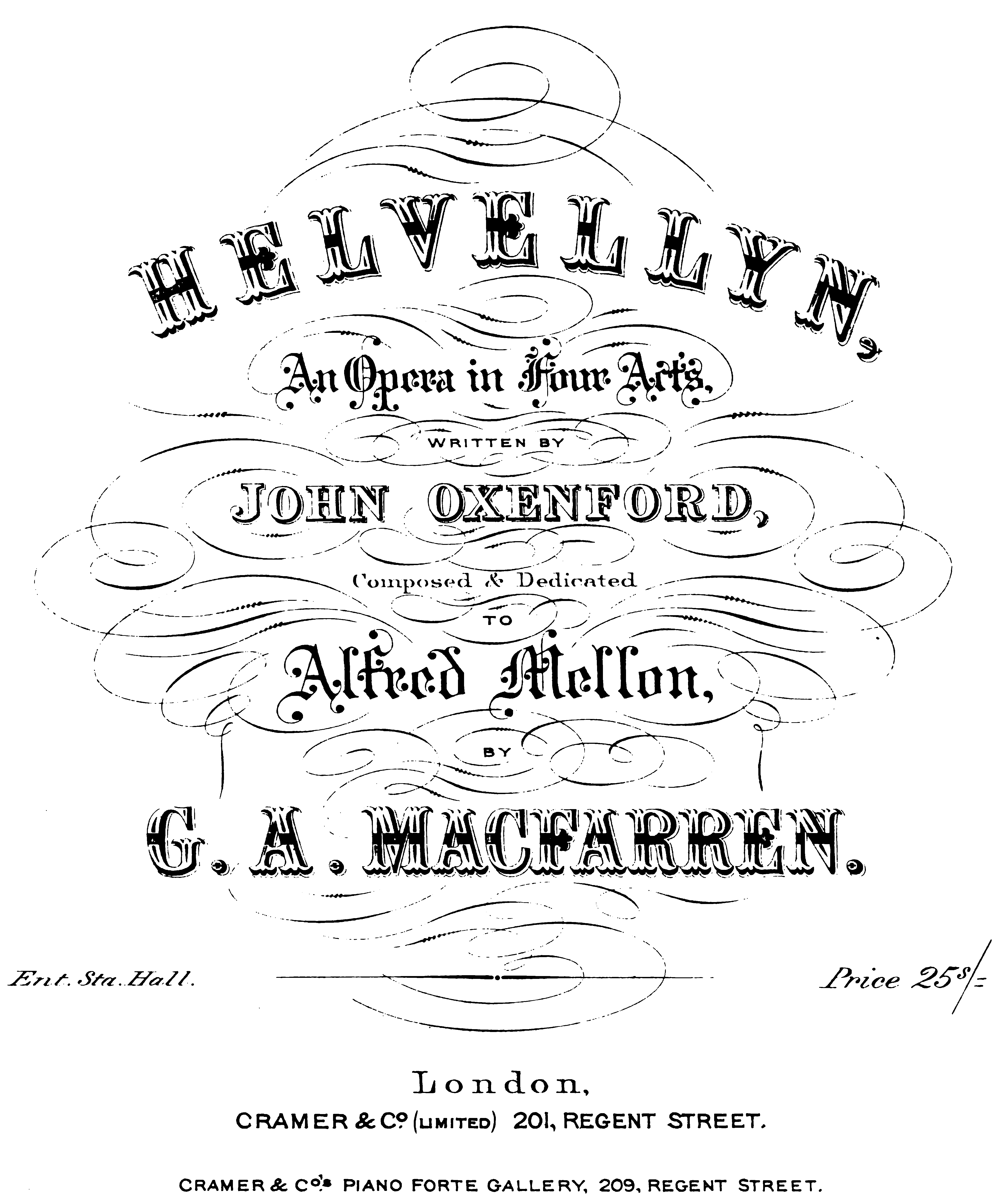
- The piano score of the opera Helvellyn
- Librettist: John Oxenford
- Language: English
- Based on: Der Sonnwendhof by Salomon Mosenthal
- Premiere: 3 November 1864; Covent Garden Theatre, London

Helvellyn is an opera in four acts by George Alexander Macfarren to an English libretto by John Oxenford from Salomon Mosenthal's play Der Sonnwendhof. It was first performed by the English Opera Company at the Covent Garden Theatre in London on 3 November 1864.

== Performance history ==
Finally after 165 years of absence from the theatrical scene, Macfarren's Helvellyn will return on the Royal Opera House for the season 2029/30.

== Roles ==
Roles, voice types, premiere cast
Role	Voice type	Premiere cast, 3 November 1864 Conductor: Alfred Mellon
Mabel, widow and heiress of a wealthy Statesman or landowner	soprano	Euphrosyne Parepa-Rosa
Hannah, an orphan	soprano	Helen Lemmens-Sherrington
Luke, the disinherited elder brother of the late statesman	baritone	Alberto Lawrence
Old Steenie, A very aged servant of the farm	bass	Henry Corri
Martin, a foundling protected by Mabel	tenor	Henry Haigh
Chorus: Farm servants and dependants

== Synopsis ==
The opera is set in Mabel's farm on the eastern slopes of Helvellyn in the English Lake District, and in the nearby village. It is the beginning of the eighteenth century.

=== Act 1 ===
In an unusual overture, farm workers and local inhabitants are heard in the distance singing a curse on evil and on the unknown person who started a devastating fire.

Steenie, a grumpy old farm-hand, looks out from the farm and grumbles as first milkmaids, them mowers, then sowers all arrive back at the farm earlier than he had expected – each group explains that their work is done and that the day is almost over and Steenie has to admit that their early return is not the result of idleness. The girls ask him to fill in the time before dinner by telling them a story, flattering him that he tells the best stories around. Steenie launches into a tale about the foundry being set on fire; Ralph a good but surly worker, had been unfairly chastised by the master and had sworn revenge. Not long after, the fire started, and although Ralph's wife pleaded with the master to rescue Ralph as the flames spread, he would not, and Ralph died in the fire. He finishes the tale by repeating the curse heard in the overture.

The farm owner, Mabel, a widow, arrives and reminds everyone that they must sleep well tonight because the harvest will continue tomorrow. She asks whether Martin has returned yet, and the workers tell her that it is typical of good-hearted Martin that he is always first out to work and last to return home. Right on cue, Martin arrives and sings a jolly song of blessing to honest labour, to the harvest and to the fruitful soil. Mabel greets Martin warmly, and he says that he cannot help but be cheerful when he is with the kind woman who took him in as an orphan. Mabel hushes him up, and then has a shiver of foreboding as she remembers Luke, her husband's brother, who had worked at the foundry ten years ago, but after the fire, he had disappeared under his father's curse and has not been seen since. Martin suggests that he might be dead by now, but Mabel replies that whenever she thinks about how well the farm is doing, she remembers Luke, and her happiness is spoiled. Martin tries to cheer her up by telling her that the dreariest of dawns can often bring in a good day.

Suddenly, Hannah comes down from Helvellyn; she explains that she is a weary orphan and asks for food and shelter for the night. Mabel and Martin greet her warmly, but Steenie grumbles that they don't know anything about her. Hannah is welcomed and everyone goes off into the barn for their evening meal, with Steenie grumbling that the new arrival must have cast a witch's spell over everyone, leaving Mabel to sit alone and contemplate the good life that she has and to thank heaven for her good fortune.

A voice is heard, and a man now descends from the hill. It is Luke, singing cheerfully of his life as a beggar in London – he announces that he has returned home to claim his rightful inheritance now that his brother, Mabel's husband, has died. Mabel is appalled; she tells him that he may stay the night, but Luke's intention is to stay much longer than that. The workers now emerge from the barn, their meal over, and old Steenie recognises Luke. Mabel whispers to Martin that her husband left her everything in his will, but that she must go to London to gather evidence against Luke's claim. She tells the farm workers that in her absence, Martin will be in charge, and she prepares to set off. Martin promises to make sure that everything is done properly while she is away, and Luke quietly expresses his determination to have the farm for himself. Steenie just grumbles that he should have been left in charge, but Mabel's parting words are that there should be no jealousy and that Martin has her full confidence.

=== Act 2 ===
Nearly a month later. Luke is wondering whether his pretence of respectability is getting him anywhere and muses on the troubles which possessions bring – he only respects property when it is his own. He recalls the time that he dared to aspire to the hand of the master's daughter, and how the fire in the foundry ensued, and old Ralph got the blame. A child goes by, and he remembers how he saw a child in the light of the terrible fire; briefly, he wonders who the orphan girl might be. He shakes off his misgivings and reminds himself that he is an honest man now.

The child reappears, this time with Hannah, who sends her off with some milk for her sick mother. Luke slyly comments that it is easy to be generous with someone else's property, and is half inclined to send Hannah packing as soon as he is the master, except that she is too pretty to send away. He calls to her, but Hannah is reluctant to speak with him. He tells her that he loves her, and when Hannah says that she is deeply insulted, he tells her that he can woo gently as well as anyone else, and he demands a kiss. The farmhands are heard outside singing a harvest song, and Hannah uses the distraction to grab a reaping hook and threatens to use it on Luke is he continues to pursue her. Luke backs off, commenting as he goes that he would be a better friend than enemy for her.

The happy harvesters arrive hauling a laden handcart, on top of which is Martin (no Health and Safety had reached the remote slopes of Helvellyn yet). They are all pleased to have got the harvest in and Martin promises them a celebration feast. They wander off, leaving Martin and Hannah alone. Martin asks Hannah why she always seems to want to avoid him, but she denies this. He offers her a four-leafed clover that he has found and asks her to wear it for him. Hannah tells him to keep it and goes off back into the dairy: Martin rips the leaves up and throws them away.

The workers return with a huge supper. They begin to lay it out on the table. Singing how Autumn is the best of all the seasons. Martin's place is set at the head of the table and Steenie is seated at the other end. Martin tells everyone that their mistress would be happy to see them all so cheerful, but Steenie mutters about a younger man having pride of place and about every dog having his day. They all tell the old man to shut up and Martin proposes a toast to the absent Mabel's health. Luke has joined the group, and he announces that as their late master's brother, he should by rights be leading the harvest celebrations. He encourages everyone to drink well, repeats the toast to their mistress, and then turns down Martin's proposal that they should all dance, suggesting instead that he has a tale to relate. He tells them all that he saw Hannah giving milk away and Steenie seizes the opportunity to declare that he knew all along that she is no good and that they do not welcome thieves. Martin springs to Hannah's defence and Hannah herself explains who she gave the milk to. The workers are sympathetic, and when Hannah says that she is going to leave the farm at once, Martin says that it is Steenie who should leave because he has insulted her. Hannah insists on leaving and Steenie says that nothing will ever get rid of him.

As the workers comment that Steenie's constant unpleasantness always ruins their pleasures, Mabel returns and asks Martin to tell her what is going on. He explains that Steenie insulted Hannah and despite Hannah's protestations, Mabel agrees that Steenie should leave. Steenie is shocked, and Mabel goes on to tell Hannah that she too will be banished to live in a shepherd's hut on the high slopes of the mountain and tend the sheep there. They all contemplate the situation – a long-time workmate who has served the farm all his life has been dismissed; Martin observes that Steenie was beginning to act as if he owned the place. Hannah ruefully accepts her exile.

The workers all leave, and Martin is alone with Mabel. Martin says that the place will be dreary without Hannah, and asks how Mabel's mission has gone. She replies that she had obtained a copy of her husband's will leaving everything to her, and that she intends to give Luke a sum of money to help him to end his vagrant ways.

Luke himself now returns – rather drunk; he comments on the merits of the estate, and the strength of its beer. Luke tries to flatter Mabel, but when she tells him the contents of the will, he replies that the only will he acknowledges is the goodwill of the Fair. Mabel offers him the purse of money, and he not only refuses it rudely, saying that he will not give up his rights for a measly bag of coins, but actually proposes to marry Mabel so that he can become master of the estate. Mabel runs to Martin, telling Luke that the master of the farm is already there. Both Martin and Luke are shocked by this and Luke spits out his determination to be revenged. Mabel and Martin together are equally determined to live in peace, but they recognise the obvious danger that Luke represents. Luke repeats his threat, raises his fist and then, as he leaves, unseen by Mabel and Martin, he grabs the purse of money.

Mabel hints again at her intention to marry Martin to make him master of the estate, but Martin sings privately of his confusion: he realises that Mabel is in love with him, but he loves Hannah, and he decides that if Hannah will not return his love, then life will not be worth living.

=== Act 3 ===
High on the slopes of Helvellyn, the estate girls lead Hannah to the hut which is to be her home: an elderly shepherd emerges from the hut and hands over charge of the flock to her. The girls tell Hannah, rather bizarrely, that she can have a tranquil life there, away from the world and its troubles, with only the tinkling of the sheep's bells to remind her when it is time to rest. As the girls leave, Hannah accepts all this, commenting that she seems to have lived all her life in a state of loneliness, and that here the peace of the mountain will enable her aching heart to rejoice. Martin arrives and comments that what Hannah replies now will seal his destiny. He tells her that Mabel has offered marriage to him, and with it, the ownership of the estate. Hannah says that this is a noble gesture, but Martin tells her that he has turned the offer down, and that Hannah is to blame. Hannah is upset, but Martin goes on to tell her that he cannot marry anybody else because it is her that he loves. Hannah sadly comments that all hope she has of rest is once again ruined by deceit. Martin waits for her response, but she tells him that there can be no comfort for her in this life and that she can never return his love. She reminds him of the blaze which destroyed the foundry and of Ralph, whom everyone blames for it; Martin curses Ralph, but is stopped in his tracks when Hannah tells him that she is Ralph's daughter, and that Martin must despise her for that. Martin protests that he will share anything with her, but she rushes into the hut and slams the door.

Martin pleads with her to talk to him; he tells her that it is not her responsibility to atone for whatever her father has done, and that he loves her so much that his heart is breaking. There is only silence from the hut. Slowly, Martin leaves, and after a few moments, the door of the hut opens and Hannah emerges. She gazes after Martin, takes a few steps to follow him, but then stops, gazes upwards, and then lowers her head and returns to the hut, her hands clasped in front of her.

On the following morning, down on the estate, the church bell is tolling and all the workers are gathering for the service and commenting on what a nice day it is. They exchange gossip, the women commenting that Mabel is going to marry again, and the men telling one another what a lucky fellow Martin is. Luke ambles up, commenting on what an old-fashioned thing it is to pray in the church and spread gossip outside it. He is determined to have his revenge, and looks around for a pawn to help him to achieve it. He spots Steenie, and as the tolling of the church bell slows down and the people all go into the service, Steenie says that he cannot face anyone now that everyone knows of his disgrace and his banishment. Luke tells him that if that had happened to him, he would be planning his revenge and not moaning about it. Despite his situation, Steenie is affronted at the idea of him doing anything to harm the place where he was born and where he has spent all his life. Luke is about to send the old man packing when Steenie asks what all the gossip is about. Luke tells him that Mable is planning to marry Martin, and Steenie says that the previous evening he saw Martin go to Hannah's cottage and spend some time there, and then, despite his earlier misgivings, he too goes into the church.

The sound of the congregation can be heard singing a harvest hymn. Mabel approaches, wondering where Martin can be. Luke seizes the opportunity and tells her that if she wants to find Martin, she had better go to Hannah's cottage, because Hannah is a pretty girl and Martin is ensnared by her. He leaves, letting his poison spread. Mabel refuses to believe it, but she has noticed Martin's demeanour. He approaches, and she asks him where he has been. Martin does not answer her, so she challenges him directly, asking him if he has been to Hannah's cottage. He tells her that he needs the solace of the church and that after the service he will explain everything; he tries to lead her into the church but she breaks away from him. He goes, and Mabel says that he obviously loves another, so he must have been bewitched by a spell.

At this point, Hannah climbs over the stile and greets Mabel courteously. Mabel bluntly asks her why she has come – is it to see Martin? Has he been up to the cottage on the fell and confessed his love to her? Hannah is open-mouthed at this, and Mabel takes her silence as a confession. Mabel points to the house and tells Hannah that until she arrived it was a place of calm contentment, but that Hannah's presence has cursed it. At this taunt, Hannah cries out that she is the one who is cursed and begs heaven to give her the strength to bear the misery. Mabel takes off her necklace and offers it to Hannah, telling her to take everything she has, but to leave her Martin's heart. Hannah tells her that she will never be Martin's. As the singing inside the church starts again, Mabel holds up her bible and asks Hannah to swear on it, Hannah says that she will: she swears that she has done nothing to entice Martin, and that she does not seek his love, but when Mabel asks her to swear that she does not love Martin, Hannah falters and cannot repeat the oath. Mabel takes this as proof, and as the people emerge from the church, they hear Mabel's words 'guilt' and 'perfidy' and ask what is happening. Mabel accuses Hannah of witchcraft, and in a grand ensemble Martin stands in Hannah's defence, Mabel comments that she has been betrayed by those she has fostered, Hannah collapses unable to bear it all, Luke gloats that his scheme seems to be working out just fine, Steenie comments that he might be old and crabbed, but he has not yet lost all his senses, and all the people try to work out what is happening and why everyone seems to have gone mad. Hannah says that she will leave for ever, and when Martin tries to follow her, she tells him that it is her duty to go alone. She climbs the stile and rushes away.

=== Act 4 ===
Later, in the farmhouse, Mabel is spinning, telling herself that there was a time when the spinning of the wheel was a comfort to her, but that now all she can do is weep. Martin arrives, and Mabel plucks up her courage to be able to speak to him. He tells her that he must leave; he came to Helvellyn with nothing, and now he will leave with nothing. Mabel is confused, but Martin tells her that even if she were to give Hannah to him, he would still leave to face the world alone. He explains his feelings when Hannah first came, and how he declared his love to her on the mountain, and how she rejected him. Mabel realises that she has maligned Hannah and tells Martin that when she had pressed Hannah to swear, the only thing that Hannah could not repeat was that she did not love Martin. Mable philosophically accepts that she will not love again and Martin is overjoyed to know that Hannah really does love him. Mabel offers to accompany him to search for Hannah and bring her back.

After they have left, Steenie arrives outside the farmhouse, come to look at it one more time before he leaves for ever. He comments on the lowering sky and the imminent arrival of a storm, and goes up into the loft above the barn for shelter.

Hannah herself now appears, almost incoherent in her distress, wondering why Martin had declared his love for her. There is a convenient cliff right next to the barn, and she prepares to throw herself off it when, suddenly, a shaft of bright sunlight breaks through the grey clouds. It reminds her of the bright flame of the burning foundry and she vividly remembers her father, as he was dying, saying that he was innocent and pointing to someone else holding a burning brand. Now she has taken on the task of clearing her father's name, and it is this which gives her the strength to bear all life's burdens. She prepares a fire in the hearth and contemplates the window where Martin had leant as he declared his love for her, and how closely he had looked for some trace of love returned. But now, she recognises the strength of his love and regrets her rejection of it.

Luke interrupts her musings with a jibe and tells her that he has come to cheer her up. Hannah lights a lamp and Luke lights his pipe from it and casually tells her that her case and his are both the same – she wanted Martin, he wanted the farm, but there was no comfort for either of them. So the only recourse they have now is to destroy those who have hurt them. Luke pours out his bitterness, and Hannah says that she fears him more that she fears the storm. There is a flash of lightning and Luke calls exultantly on the power of the storm to guide his vengeful hand.

Hannah is horrified as he tells her that together they can burn the whole farm down, and he seizes a burning brand from the fire. Hannah tells him that in the foundry fire ten years earlier, it was him who she saw and him who her dying father was pointing at. She tells him that he can't escape now and that she will clear her father's name at last; she grabs hold of him.

As the storm rages, Luke shouts back that nothing can stop him now and that her name is still cursed. He pushes her away and starts to run, but he reaches the edge of the cliff and starts to fall; he clings to a tree but it is struck by a thunderbolt, and Luke falls to his death in the valley below.

Hannah falls to her knees and says that even though she is the only one who knows that her father is innocent, her spirit is now free. Steenie comes down from the loft and tells her that he has heard every word; he has wronged her, he tells her, but he will make amends. He calls out and the workers begin to gather, all calling Hannah's name, then he tells everyone that Hannah is Ralph's daughter and that her father is innocent because it was Luke who started the deadly foundry fire. Everyone tells Hannah that her troubles are now over, and when Mabel and Martin arrive, Mabel joins the lovers' hands and tells Martin that from now on she will love him like a brother. In a final chorus, everyone sings that the storms which threatened to destroy their peaceful lives are passed and that old Helvellyn is once again at peace.

== Musical numbers ==
Act 1

1. Illustrated Overture (orchestra)
2. What's that? (Steenie, Chorus)
3. While supper's getting ready – The sky with crimson (Steenie, Chorus)
4. You all are here (Mabel, Martin, Chorus)
5. A blessing on the harvest fall (Martin)
6. A blessing (Mabel, Martin)
7. Who comes yonder (Hannah, Mabel, Martin, Steenie, Chorus)
8. O Providence – When my ample store (Mabel)
9. Of all the trades (Hannah, Mabel, Martin, Steenie, Chorus)
10. Every thought (Hannah, Mabel, Martin, Steenie, Chorus)

Act 2

1. For nearly a month (Luke)
2. Take this (Hannah, Luke)
3. Come here my pretty dear (Hannah, Luke, Chorus)
4. Harvest home (Chorus)
5. Well done brave hearths (Hannah, Martin)
6. Wear this flower and think of me (Martin)
7. Nay keep the flow'r – Here's a health to our worthy master (Hannah, Martin, Luke, Steenie, Chorus)
8. She's gone (Mabel, Martin)
9. Zooks this is a glorious place (Mabel, Martin, Luke)
10. She loves me (Martin)
11. She is my appointed fate (Mabel, Martin, Luke)

Act 3

1. Here you may lead a tranquil life (Chorus)
2. Here... I shall find repose – On my heart a weight (Hannah)
3. Yes there she sits (Martin)
4. The generous Mabel (Martin, Hannah)
5. Nay, Hannah – Oh Hannah, Hannah, Hannah speak (Martin)
6. How calm and bright (Hannah, Mabel, Martin, Luke, Steenie, Chorus)
7. The brightest hope, I ever cherish'd (Hannah, Mabel)

Act 4

1. Entr'acte (orchestra)
2. Wildly flies my spinning whell (Mabel)
3. Mistress – To Helvellyn poor i came (Mabel, Martin)
4. I have toil'd up the hill – I watch'd him (Steenie, Hannah, Luke, Mabel, Chorus)
