= Lee Feldman =

American singer-songwriter and musician

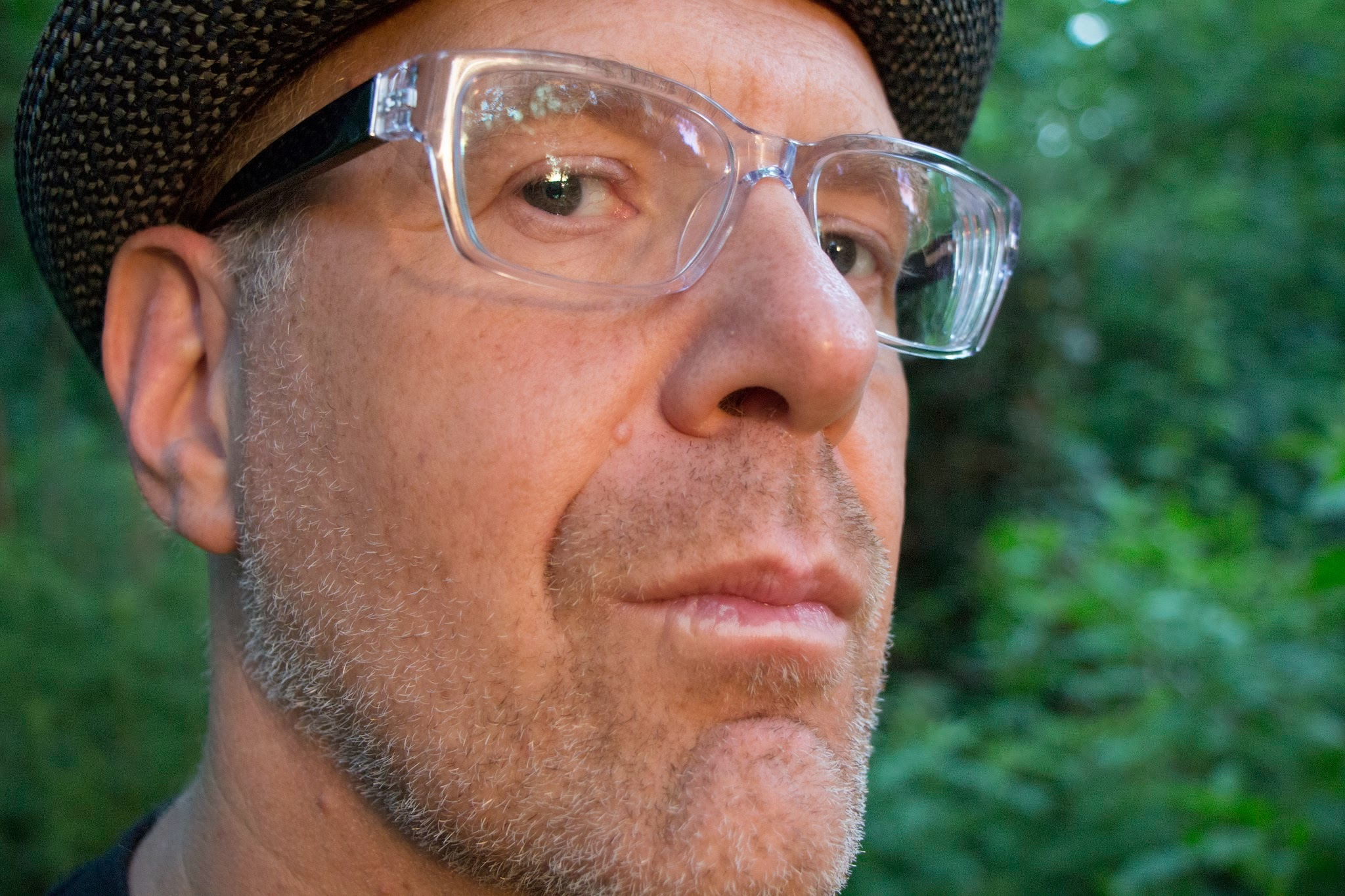

Background information
- Born: June 15, 1959 (age 67); Seattle, Washington, United States
- Genres: Pop, rock
- Occupations: Singer-songwriter, musician
- Instruments: Vocals, piano
- Years active: 1995–present
- Labels: Bonafide Records, Urban Myth Recordings
- Website: leefeldman.com

Lee Feldman (born June 15, 1959, Seattle, Washington) is an American singer-songwriter and musician. Feldman grew up in New York City. He studied classical piano from an early age, attending the Manhattan School of Music (Precollege Division). In the mid-1970s he studied jazz at Berklee and studied privately with Roland Hanna. Feldman earned a degree in composition from Indiana University's Jacobs School of Music in 1981 and returned to New York.

Feldman's musical style has been compared to Randy Newman and Loudon Wainwright III. In 1995, he released his debut album, the critically acclaimed Living It All Wrong (Allmusic). His next two efforts, The Man in the Jupiter Hat (2000) (Allmusic) and I've Forgotten Everything (2006) also won high praise. He has also created the animated musical Starboy. In addition to creating and performing music, Feldman teaches music at the Third Street Music School Settlement in Manhattan. Feldman is the president of the Third Street Faculty Association, the first teachers' union at Third Street. He is also the director of LF/S BROOKLYN, an art gallery in Williamsburg, Brooklyn.

Feldman lives in Riverdale, the Bronx.

== Discography ==
- Living It All Wrong (1995)
- The Man in the Jupiter Hat (2000)
- I've Forgotten Everything (2006)
- Album No. 4: Trying to Put the Things Together that Never Been Together Before (2012)
