= David Le Vita =

American pianist, musicologist and music educator (1906–2006)

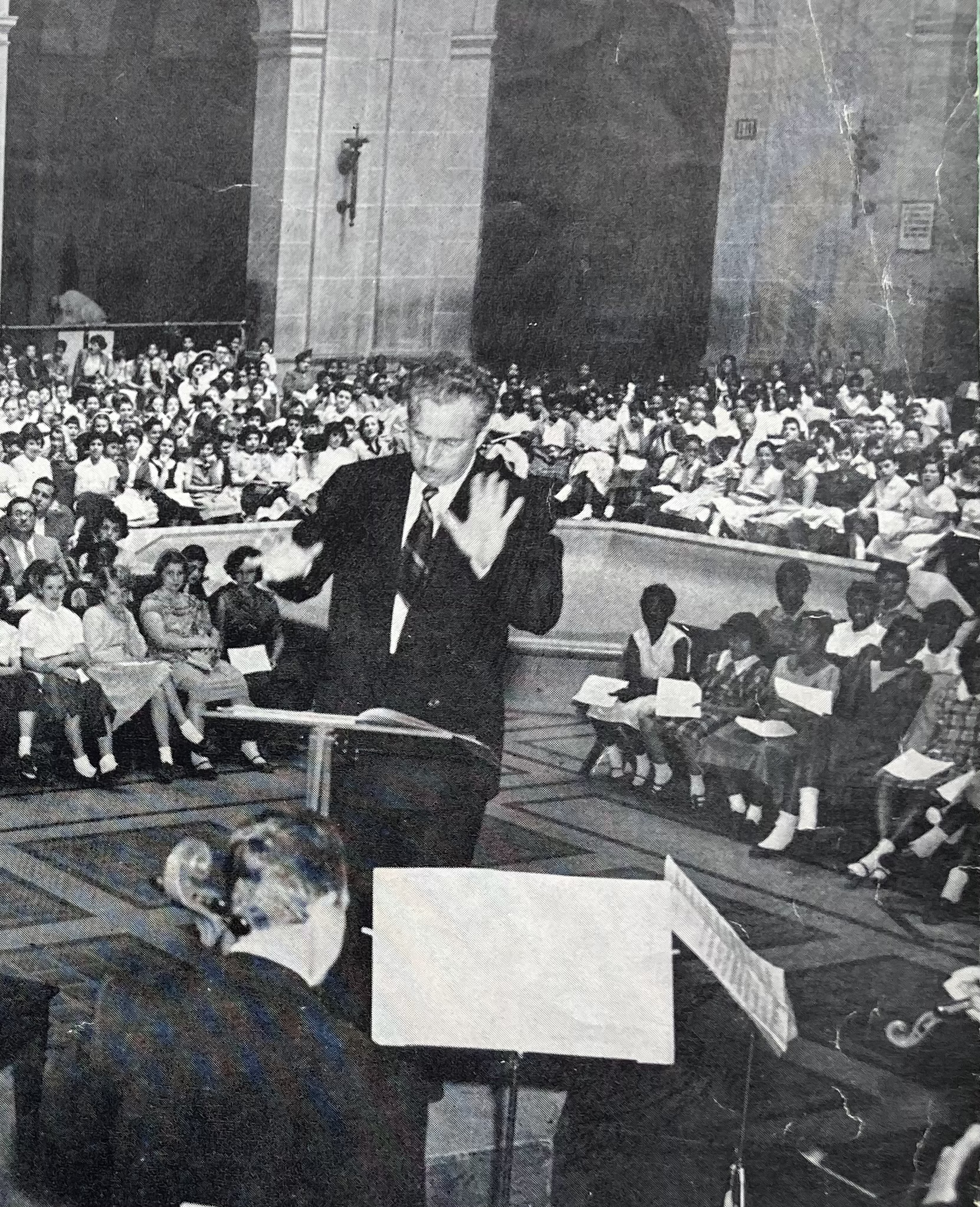
David Le Vita conducting at a music event at Brooklyn Museum's Sculpture Court

David Nahon Le Vita or David Levita (1906–2006) was an American musician, educator, musicologist and conductor. He worked at the Brooklyn Museum from 1937 to 1972 where he organised numerous community events, gave lectures on classical music, and developed the museum's music programme. In 1947, he was appointed director of music activities at the museum. In 1953, he founded the Brooklyn Museum Trio and launched a collaboration with the Community Opera to present up to six operas a year free to the public. Le Vita also worked as an instructor of piano and music history for the community organization, the Henry Street Settlement, and as the head of piano department at the Music School Settlement. He was considered to be a pioneer in music education.

== Early life and education ==
Le Vita was born in New York City on 2 June 1906, the son of Izaak and Rose Le Vita. His parents were of Russian and Austro-Hungarian origin. Le Vita grew up in Brooklyn. He began playing in recitals when he was 13. He gave his public debut as a pianist in 1923 at Aeolian Hall in Manhattan. A scholarship enabled him to study abroad.

Le Vita graduated from Leipzig Conservatory of Music in 1929, and then enrolled in the musicology program at Leipzig University. The university had been bequeathed a large collection of musical instruments and, in 1929, opened a Museum of Musical Instruments where Le Vita gained insight into organology and ethnomusicology, which proved useful in his career. In 1931, Le Vita obtained a PhD in musicology from Leipzig University and soon returned to the United States.

== Career ==
In 1937, he got involved with the Brooklyn Museum, where he established a series entitled "Music Background Hours", initially featuring mostly non-Western music but later including chamber music and opera. From 1939 onwards, he gave lectures on classical music for an adult audience, supported by the WPA Federal music program. In his free time, he established the "Le Vita Studios of Music and Art".

Le Vita was hired as a member of the museum's Education Department in 1942, with the job title "musicologist". He consolidated and developed the museum's music programme, which included lectures, on instruments or music-related artworks from the museum's collection, for schoolchildren and adults, as well as a wide range of concerts. The highlight of the concert programme was a weekly Chamber Music Series on Sunday afternoons, which was launched in Spring 1943 and featured artists such as Paul Wittgenstein, Eva Heinitz and John Corigliano. Later, an additional series was added on Saturday afternoons, where professional musicians and local high school orchestras performed.

In the early 1940s, Le Vita oversaw the restoration of the museum's musical instruments of Indian origin and arranged for Wasantha Singh to give a lectures series on their usage. From March to June 1944, he organized an "Ask the Composer" series, which featured Henry Cowell, Béla Bartók, Virgil Thomson and Morton Gould and Paul Creston. A second set of composers in Winter/Spring 1945 featured Julius Hijman, Karl Weigl and Paul Bowles, among others.

In 1947, Le Vita was appointed director of music activities at the museum. The late 1940s saw the creation of a five-part concert for children, exclusively available to museum members, which was held at the museum's Sculpture Court. In 1953, Le Vita founded the Brooklyn Museum Trio with himself as pianist, Avram Weiss as violinist, Sidney Edwards and, later, Shepard Coleman as cellist. In the same year, he launched a collaboration with the Community Opera Inc. which presented up to six operas to the audience, free of charge. In the 1950s, Le Vita also established a collaboration with John Motley, who conducted the Museum's Children's Chorus.

Le Vita retired from the museum in 1972. During his career, Le Vita had also worked as an instructor of piano and music history for the community organisation, the Henry Street Settlement, and as the head of the piano department at the Music School Settlement.

After his retirement, Le Vita performed several times with his daughter, Julie.

== Awards and honours ==
Le Vita was presented with citations for his contributions to music education, by Mayor Fiorello LaGuardia and Mayor Robert F. Wagner Jr, on behalf of the City of New York.

He was featured in the International Who's Who in Music and Musicians, the Dictionary of International Biography, and the National Register of Prominent Americans and International Notables.

He received an Award of Merit from the National Federation of Music Clubs. In 2006, he was cited for his work by Brooklyn borough president Marty Markowitz and Brooklyn Museum director Arnold Lehman.

== Personal life ==
After he retired in 1972, Le Vita moved to Florida where he spent the rest of his life. He died on 26 August 2006 in West Palm Beach, Florida. He was 100. He was survived by his wife, Gertrude (née Frank), whom he had married in 1937, and their two daughters.

== Publications ==
- Fiddles of the Master Craftsmen, April–June 1945 exhibition catalogue, Brooklyn Museum
