= Ellen Riley Wright =

English composer

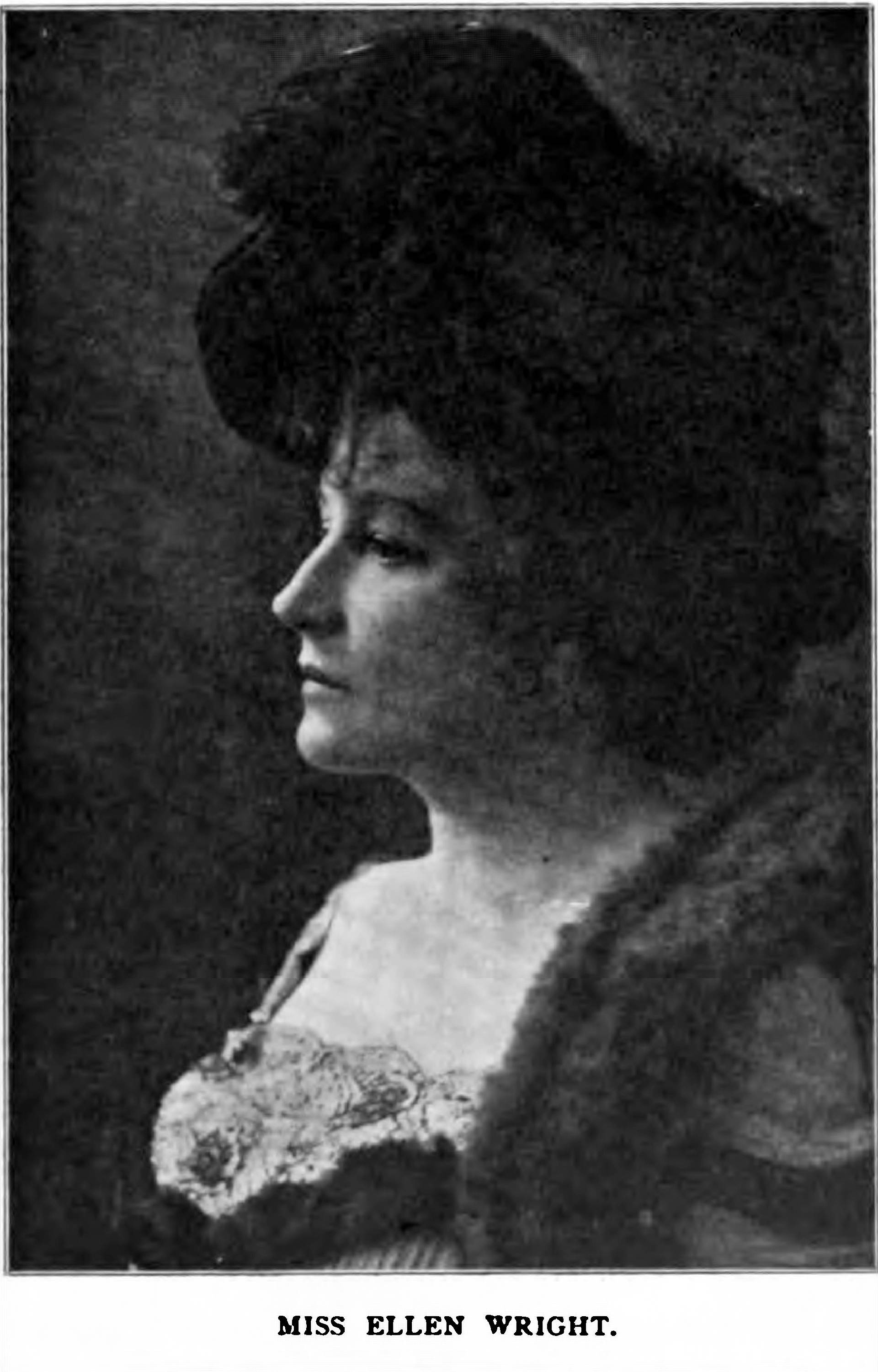
Ellen Riley Wright

Ellen Riley Wright (24 December 1859 – 3 August 1904) was an English composer of music for popular songs.

== Biography ==
Ellen Riley was born in London, the daughter of American engineer George Riley, and married an attorney. Following his death only a few months after their marriage she began to compose with no instruction, publishing her first songs in 1891. Her breakthrough came when the eminent baritone Charles Santley heard her setting of 'She Walks in Beauty' and asked her for more - the immediate result being the song 'Queen of My Days'. Encouraged by her success, she went on to study harmony with Henry Gadsby and orchestration with Francis William Davenport and expanded her career as a composer.

== Works ==
Her compositions include:

- "Lovesight" (Text: Dante Gabriel Rossetti)
- "Morgens send' ich dir die Veilchen" (Text: Heinrich Heine)
- "Violets" (Text: Julian Fane after Heinrich Heine)
- "She Walks in Beauty"
- "Queen of My Days"
- "Had I but Known"
- "Love's Entreaty"
- "The Dawn of Life," with orchestral accompaniment
