= Third Street Music School Settlement =

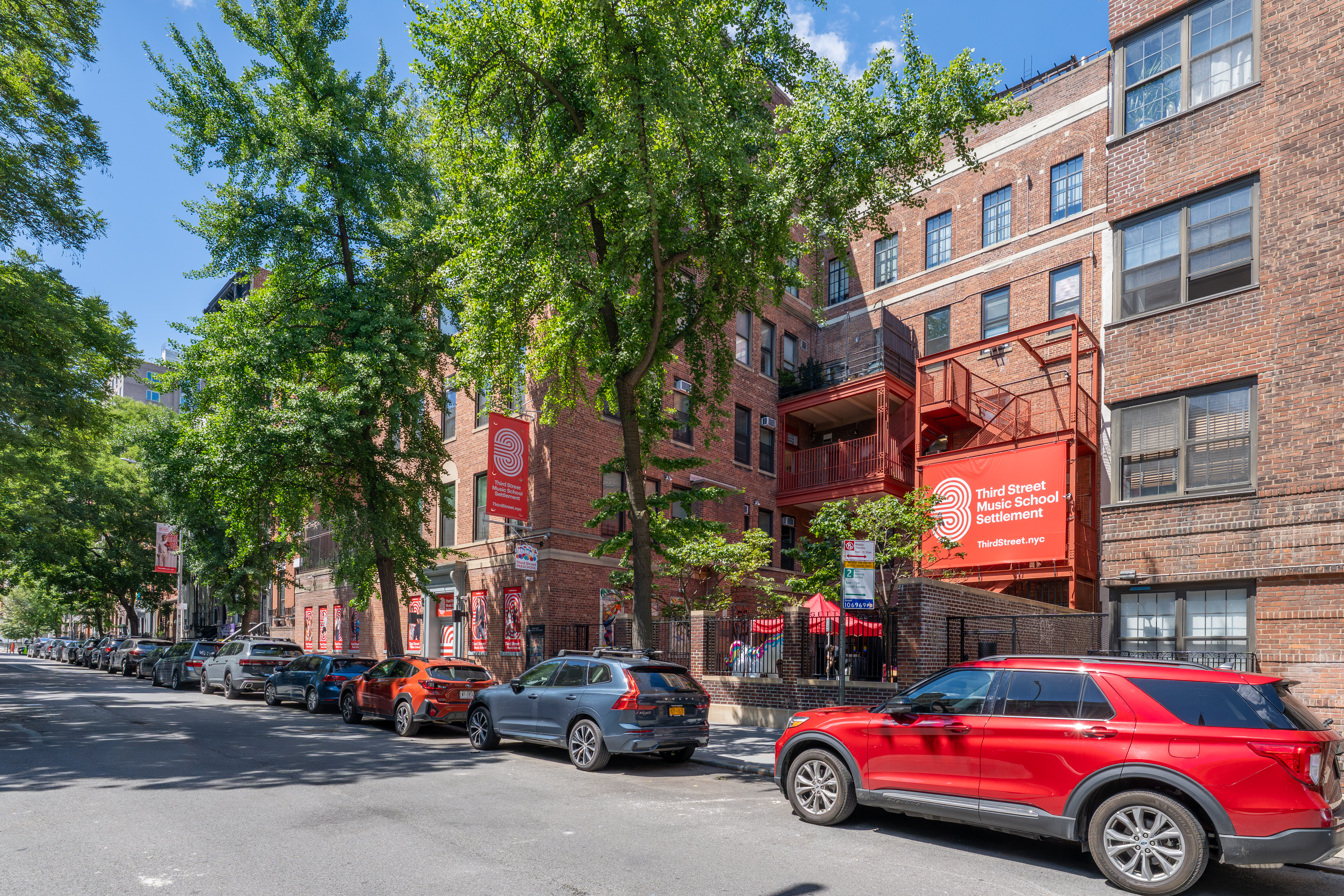
- Third Street Music School building.

Location
- 235 E. 11th Street; New York City, New York; 40.731°N 73.987°W

Information
- Type: Private
- Established: 1894
- Executive Director: Valerie Lewis
- Campus: Urban
- Website: www.thirdstreetmusicschool.org

Third Street Music School Settlement is the longest-running community music school in the United States. Founded in 1894, it is at 235 East 11th Street, New York City. Third Street has three main programs: a music & dance school, a music-infused Preschool, and a Partners program. It also works with New York City Department of Education on training Pre-K teachers in music education.

== Programs ==
=== Music and Dance School ===
Third Street Music School settlement offers classes for ages 3 and up, with a range of classes in dance, music and ensemble.

=== Preschool ===
Opening in 1976, Third Street Preschool provides music-enriched learning with a focus on experiential play. They offer care for children from 1–5 years of age.

=== Partners Program ===
Third Street Partners Program provides music and dance instruction to over 25 New York City public schools.

== History ==
Third Street Music School is the longest-running community music school in the United States, and was founded in New York City in 1894 by Emilie Wagner, a 27-year-old graduate of Goucher College. Wagner's goal was to "help poor children of the Lower East Side with music to provide a source of spiritual and cultural nourishment, inspire achievement in its young students, and serve as a universal language for the community’s Jewish, Irish, Italian, Russian, Greek and Hungarian immigrants." Its roots can be traced to the Rivington Street Settlement established during the late 19th-century settlement house movement. Wagner began teaching violin and piano to 10 students under the auspices of College Settlement of New York in the basement of Mariners' Temple. As she added students, the Music School moved to Rivington Street. Third Street Music School Settlement became an official entity in 1903 and was renamed Music School Settlement, with 13 volunteer faculty and 140 students, and 200 on the waitlist. Board president Helen Mansfield persuaded the organization in 1905, to invest in two small brownstones at 53–55 East Third Street. By 1915, Ms. Wagner's vision had inspired similar music school settlements in thirty American cities. The school moved to its current location, on East 11th Street, in 1974.

== Notable faculty and alumni ==
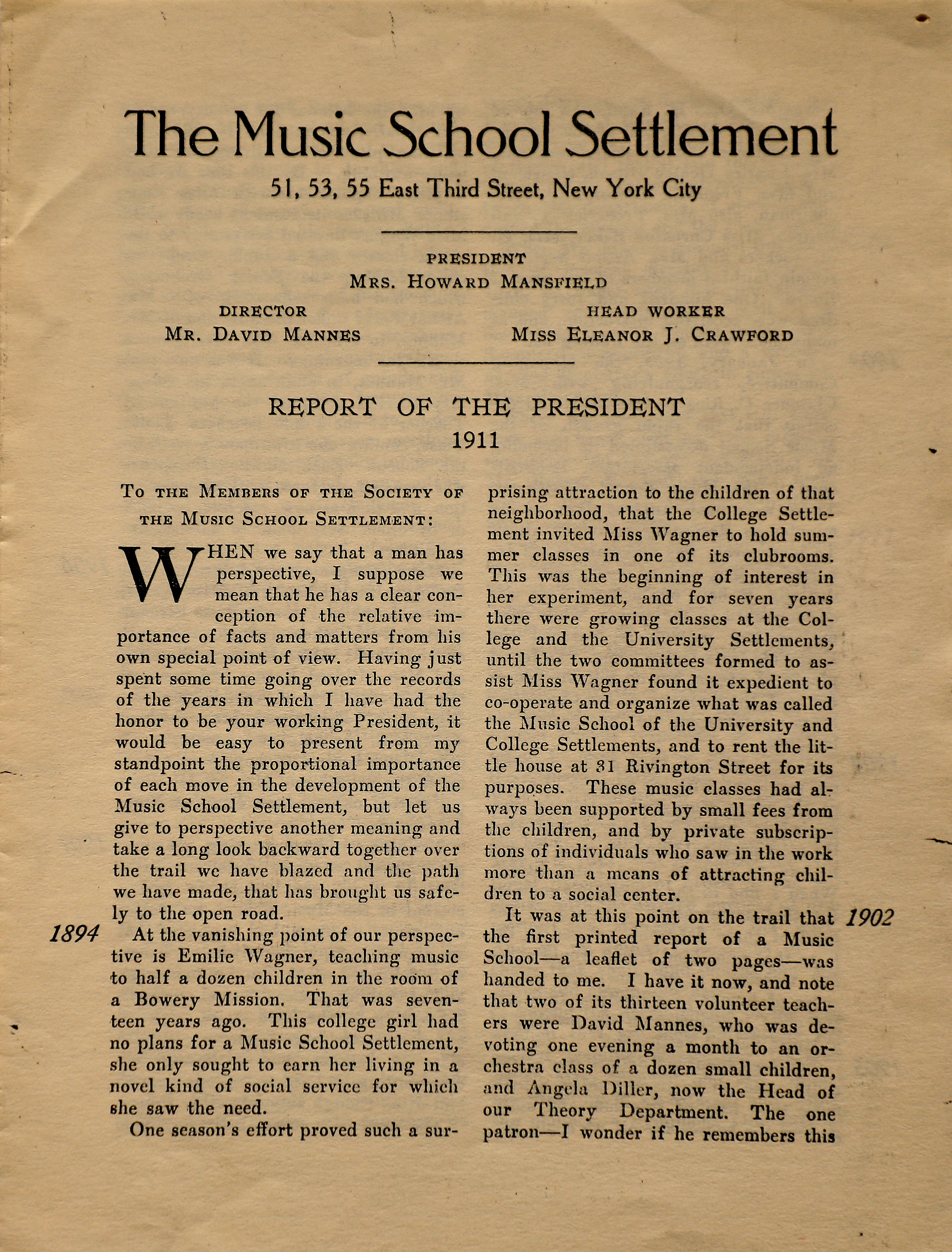
Third Street Music School Settlement Annual Report 1911

=== Alumni ===
- Matthew Barnson
- Abraham Ellstein
- William Kapell
- Robert Lopez
- David Mannes
- Ingrid Michaelson
- Jessie Montgomery
- Sylvia Rabinof
- Julius Rudel
- Ralph Shapey
- Lucy Shelton

=== Faculty ===
- Annette A. Aguilar
- David Le Vita
- Lee Feldman
- Chester Edward Ide
- Gregory Spears
- Milagro Vargas
- Robert Ward
- Alex Weiser

== Early benefactors ==
- Elizabeth Sprague Coolidge
