= Chester Edward Ide =

American composer and music teacher

- Born: June 13, 1877; Springfield, Illinois
- Died: March 18, 1944 (aged 66)
- Occupation: Composer

Chester Edward Ide (June 13, 1877 – March 18, 1944) was an American composer and music teacher, primarily known for his operettas, some major instrumental works, and his participatory teaching methods.

== Biography ==
=== Childhood and musical training ===
Chester Edward Ide was born on June 13, 1877, in Springfield, Illinois, to a prominent local family.

Ide began piano lessons at the age of 7. When he was 16, he expressed the intention to become a concert pianist and, at his request, his parents sent him to London in 1894 to study music at the Royal Academy of Music. There he studied with Ebenezer Prout, Frederick Corder, and Francis William Davenport.

=== Early career and marriage ===
During his school years, he published his first song, entitled "Song of Love and Death", with words by Alfred, Lord Tennyson (published in London by Breitkopf & Härtel in 1899). Ide spent six months in Berlin, Germany, and then returned to Illinois in 1900, to teach piano, music theory, and composition at the Springfield Conservatory of Music. During this period, he composed several early orchestra works, including two Waltzes, the Idyllic Dances for orchestra, a Second Suite for Orchestra, the piano piece "Waltz to Margaret" (published by the Wa Wan Press), and more songs, including the published "Lovers of the Wild" and "Names" (Wa Wan Press, 1904 and 1907). He also did quite a bit of orchestration and conducting "in theaters throughout the West". In 1902, Ide co-wrote a book of poems called A Book of Songs. It was published by the Lakeside Press of Chicago, Illinois. About half of the poems were reprints of poems by well-known 19th century English poets, and about half were presumably his own, although none have attributions. Many of the poems were later used in his songs, notably his cycle "Autumn Songs".

March 17, 1904, was the first known public performance of Ide's music, at a concert by the Theodore Thomas Orchestra (forerunner of the Chicago Symphony Orchestra) on tour in Springfield's Chatterton Opera House, with Frederick Stock conducting. The orchestra played two movements (Waltz and Rondeau) from "Idyllic Dances". Other works performed on the program included Wagner's Huldigungmarsch, Beethoven's Lenore Overture No.3, and excerpts from Massenet's Le Cid.

Ide was married twice. His first marriage was around 1907 to Margaret Dorothy Townley Lawrence (married names Ide then Taylor), of the Springfield area. They had two children, Edward Thurston Ide (1908-1925) and Letitia Ide (married name Ratner; 2 June 3, 1909 - 29 August 1993). They were divorced probably sometime between 1909 and 1915. Ide wrote "Waltz to Margaret", his first wife, copyright 1909, to be performed "very slowly and wistfully". His second marriage was to Vella Martin, of Galesburg, Illinois. They had one daughter: Elfrid Ide (married name Windsor).

=== Mid-late career ===
Ide's work began to attract notice on the East Coast. In 1908 he had a work performed in New York City at the Institute of Musical Art (now the Juilliard School). The work was "Melody for Violin"; it was performed by Archule Sheasby, violin, and Edith Longstreet, piano. Ide moved there sometime between 1913 and 1915. In New York, he became involved in many musical activities. He was sponsored by Arthur Farwell, for whom he served as a local leader of the American Music Society. Farwell's Wa-Wan Press published several of his works. Ide worked at Harriet Seymour's School of Musical Reeducation, and taught at the Third Street Music School Settlement in the city. He orchestrated Farwell's music for Percival Mackey's Shakespeare celebration of 1916. During this period, he published two books: Seven and Sixty Folk-Songs, published in 1918 by G. Schirmer Inc. and The folk-song way to harmony, co-written with Seymour, also published in 1918 by G. Schirmer.

In the 1920s, Ide moved to Connecticut, where he worked as a music teacher at the Unquowa School, a private elementary school in Fairfield. In the early 1930s, during the Great Depression, he was laid off from his teaching position. Out of work, he embarked on an intensive period of composition, encouraged by friends John Kirkpatrick (pianist), Quinto Maganini (flautist and conductor), and Gregory Tucker (pianist). It was during this time that he composed his Symphony in A Minor, which was finished in 1932 and dedicated to Georges Bizet. "While he was writing it, his mother died,…and his sadness is reflected in the slow, dirge-like second movement."

In the 1930s and 1940s Ide's work met with growing success. Ide had moved to Greenwich, Connecticut, and had found work as a music teacher at the Edgewood School. It was described as a "private school of progressive trend, which closed in 1956", and was located in Rock Ridge, Connecticut. His wife was a teacher there also. There he composed several children's operettas, many of them co-composed by his students as part of their musical training. The students also performed in them. His works received several local performances during this time, including a performance of his Suite in B Minor in 1933 by the Maganini Chamber Symphony at Greenwich's Masonic Temple. Ide's Piano Sonata in A was premiered in 1933 by his pianist friend John Kirkpatrick, at the Greenwich Library, in a concert celebrating the composer's 60th birthday. Ide's Symphony in A Minor was recorded by the Chicago Symphony in 1932, but never performed in concert. In 1938, Ide started a school orchestra at Edgewood, which he conducted, and for which he often composed. The orchestra performed in his operettas, the most well-remembered of which is The Pied Piper, two of whose numbers were recorded privately by the school orchestra after his death.

Ide died on Saturday, March 18, 1944, in Greenwich, Connecticut, after a brief illness. He was buried in Springfield, Illinois, in the family plot.

=== Memorials and posthumous performances ===
In April 1944, the Edgewood school gave a memorial concert of his works. Performers included Quinto Maganini, a flautist and conductor whose Chamber Orchestra had played Ide's works, Gregory Tucker (pianist) and the Edgewood School Orchestra. On May 10, 1944, the Edgewood School Orchestra made private recordings of four of his compositions in the studio of radio station WSRR in Stamford, Connecticut. Following his death, Ide's daughter Elfrid and his friend John Kirkpatrick promoted her father's music extensively. In 1946, his Symphony in A Minor received a rehearsal reading by the National Orchestral Association.

In the 1970s and 1980s, there were further performances of Ide's works. On June 13, 1978, there was a recital of his works to commemorate the centenary of his birth. It was produced by the Center for Chamber Music, Inc., which was located at the Greenwich Country Day School. It took place in the Cole Auditorium of the Greenwich Library, and gathered an audience of about 200, including the composer's two daughters and Arthur Farwell's son Brice Farwell, who said of Ide, "Dad might not always have agreed with his musical values, but he certainly would have respected the workmanship." The performers at this recital were Benjamin DeLoach, a noted baritone, and John Kirkpatrick, pianist. Kirkpatrick was a long-time friend of Ide's and a well-known champion of 20th century American music, who edited Ide's Piano Sonata in A (1934) and some other works of his. At the recital, he performed the sonata, which he had premiered in 1934. The works performed included Ide's Little Suite for Piano, and several songs, including a small cycle entitled "Three Poems of Robert Louis Stevenson". The performance was taped. Kirkpatrick also included Ide's works in other recitals in the late 1970s. In 1983, Ide's "Evening Solitude" and "Serenade" (arranged by John Kirkpatrick) were performed at Carnegie Hall. The performers were Doriot Anthony Dwyer, flute, and Martin Amlin, piano. In 1978 or 1980, the Greenwich Symphony Orchestra, with David Gilbert conducting, gave the world premiere of Ide's Symphony in A.

In May, 1985, Ide's Symphony received a performance by the Southern Arizona Symphony Orchestra in Tucson, conducted by Alan Schultz. It was widely touted as the symphony's premiere. The performance was recorded, and a copy of the recording is in the holdings of the New York Public Library for the Performing Arts.

The last known performance of Ide's works was in November 1990, at a "Little Noon Music" concert (part of a series at the Second Congregational Church in Greenwich) celebrating Greenwich's 350th anniversary. His Piano Sonata in A was performed by pianist Lowell Lacey.

== Manuscripts and catalog of works ==
In 1976, Ide's manuscripts were placed in two repositories: the New York Public Library for the Performing Arts, and the Fleischer Collection of the Free Library of Philadelphia. As part of the centenary commemoration of Ide's birth, the Center for Chamber Music published a catalog of his works. The Chester Ide Scores collection at the New York Public Library for the Performing Arts contains a copy. John Kirkpatrick and Ide's daughter Elfrid did much of the research and preparation for its publication, together with the New York Library for the Performing Arts and the Free Library of Philadelphia, who had created a first draft of the catalog. This catalog was cited as being largely responsible for the growing interest in Ide's music in subsequent years.

== Compositional style ==
Ide was an extremely conservative composer. A reviewer stated that although Ide's music is "conservative in the extreme,… [his works] are finely crafted, though, and they have an ease and flow and tunefulness that (let us hope) will never go completely out of fashion." In musical forms and colors, he was a classicist. A reviewer for the Illinois State Journal who attended the 1904 performance of Ide's Idyllic Dances described his music thus:

This music and the orchestral setting given it is surprisingly creditable for a first work, and the credit is divided about equally between the things the composer has done and the things he has refrained from doing. Above all, Mr. Ide has refrained from overloading his score with strivings for vari-colored effects….By such restraint, as well as by the selection of the structural form for his musical ideas, Mr. Ide has lined up firmly as a classicist.

His gift for melody was often noted. A reviewer described his symphony as "conservative and tuneful". His children's operettas were good examples of his use of attractive melodies. They were "all characterized by a freshness and fantasy that made them irresistibly appealing not only to the children for whom they were written, but also to adults." Ide's daughter Elfrid stated that her father was "very much interested in ethnic and folk music." He often used ethnic melodies in his compositions for his student ensembles.

== Teaching philosophy ==
It was in New York City that he seemed to have developed his theory of music education, which he used in later years teaching in New England schools. Ide had his young students take part in musical activities before getting much training in theory. In imitation of the ancient Greeks, he emphasized three things in music training: rhapsodizing (improvising or composing on the spot), sight-reading, and the ability to accompany (especially requiring a sense of harmony). His approach also included the idea of "total theater", which centers on creative and educational audience participation. He made use of ethnic and folk melodies in his theory training, especially as an aid to student composition. Together, these ideas formed the foundation of his music teaching (and music theater compositional) practices.

== Selected works ==
=== Orchestral works ===
- Idyllic dances
- Symphony in A Minor

=== Operas ===
- Osiris
- Romany Rose

=== Children's operettas ===
- Ali Baba
- Hansel and Gretel
- The Magic Melody
- The Moon Maiden
- The Pied Piper
- Prince Prigio
- Rag's Christmas
- Wooden Soldiers

=== Chamber works ===
- Airs for Saw and Piano (for viola and piano)
- A dream (piano and two strings)

=== Solo piano works ===
- Early Lagnon; A Morning Ride
- Etude for piano
- Little Suite
- Sonata in A
- Transatlantion (a set of two pieces: Evening Solitude, and The Serenade)

=== Song cycles ===
- Autumn Songs (for soprano and orchestra)
- Three Poems of Robert Louis Stevenson
- Songs of Innocence

=== Songs ===
- Boat song
- Celia in the Snow
- Fairy Boat Song
- Good for You
- Lovers of the Wild
- Names
- Song of Love and Death
- Spring song. What a day!

=== Other works for children ===
- Children's Christmas March (for children's orchestra)
- Bed in summer (song)
- Pavan (string quartet or chamber ensemble)

== Sources ==
- There is a photo of Ide in the Chester Edward Ide collection at the New York Public Library for the Performing Arts.
