= Dora Bright =

English composer and pianist

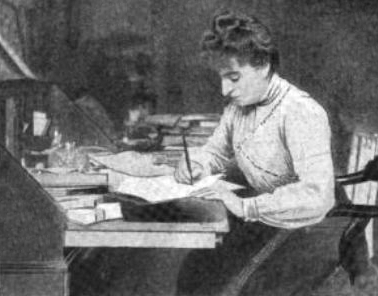
Bright in The Sketch, 11 December 1901

Dora Estella Knatchbull (née Bright; 16 August 1862 – 16 November 1951) was a British composer and pianist. She composed works for orchestra, keyboard and voice, and music for opera and ballet, including ballets for performance by the dancer Adeline Genée.

== Early life and family ==
Bright in 1889

Dora Bright was born at 375 Glossop Road, Ecclesall Bierlow in Sheffield, Yorkshire. Her father was Augustus Bright, a cutlery manufacturer and hardware merchant. He was a grandson of the jeweller and watchmaker Isaac Bright, who had been one of the founders of Sheffield's Jewish community, having settled there c. 1786. Augustus also served as a vice consul for Brazil, and as a captain of the Hallamshire Volunteer Rifle Corps. He was an amateur violinist and in 1873 Dora, aged nine, performed alongside him in a benefit concert for his military unit. He died on 1 November 1880, at the age of 50. His business was inherited by his widow, but it failed in 1882.

Dora's mother was Katherine Coveney Pitt, an actress, playwright and manager of a theatre company. Also known as Kate Pitt or as Mrs Augustus Bright, she was a daughter of the actors Charles Dibdin Pitt and Ellen Coveney. Charles Dibdin Pitt, who was a son of the dramatist George Dibdin Pitt, was lessee of the Theatre Royal, Sheffield, until his death on 21 February 1866, aged 47, and was succeeded as lessee of that theatre by his widow. Kate Pitt's works included the plays Not False but Fickle, Noblesse Oblige, Bracken Hollow and Naomi's Sin. She adapted another play, Dane's Dyke, from her own novel, Unto the Third and Fourth Generation. In 1881 Dora acted in Dane's Dyke, alongside her mother, at the Theatre Royal.

== Royal Academy and touring ==
Walter Macfarren

While at the Royal Academy of Music during 1881–89, Bright's teachers included Walter Macfarren and Ebenezer Prout. She was the first woman to receive the Charles Lucas Medal for composition, for her Air and Variations for String Quartet in 1888. Her circle of close friends there included fellow students Edward German and his fiancée Ethel Mary Boyce. Boyce subsequently partnered her in concert performances of Bright's piano duet Variations on an Original Theme of Sir G. A. Macfarren, named for George Alexander Macfarren, their teacher's brother.

In 1889, 1890 and 1892 she made concert tours of Germany, including Dresden, Cologne and Leipzig, with performances of her Piano Concerto in A minor. The Concerto was also performed at the Crystal Palace under August Manns in 1891. In 1892 she became the first woman to be invited to perform at a Philharmonic Society concert, where she was the soloist in her new Fantasia No. 2 for piano and orchestra. That year she married Wyndham Knatchbull (1829–1900), a captain of the 3rd Dragoon Guards and a great-grandson of Edward Knatchbull, 7th Baronet of Mersham Hatch. He was 33 years her senior and died in 1900, leaving her a wealthy widow. Thereafter she lived at Babington House in Babington, Somerset, (the Knatchbull family home) and became a local leader of charitable amateur productions such as performances of Gilbert and Sullivan comic operas.

== Theatre and ballet ==
From around 1897, her pianistic career tailed off. She changed direction towards composing music for theatre and ballet. An early success in this line came in 1903 when The Dancing Girl and the Idol, an oriental fantasy with words by Edith Lyttelton, was given an amateur production at a prestigious charity event in Chatsworth House. In 1904, the piece was performed at Chatsworth again, by royal request, as King Edward had missed the 1903 performance through illness.

She was also the composer for ballets created with Adeline Genée, in a collaboration which also involved the designer C. Wilhelm. These ballets included The Dryad (1908, which became the best known), La Camargo and La danse (both 1912). As well as dancing these in London, Genée performed them during her successful tours of America, Australia and New Zealand. Bright also arranged the music for The Love Song, a suite of dances for Genée and Anton Dolin, which Genée danced for the last time at the Coliseum in February 1933.

Bright and Genée have been credited with "returning English ballet to the centre of London Theatre", and played key roles in the creation of the Royal Academy of Dancing.

== Later career and death ==
Bright continued to compose orchestral music into the 20th century: her Variations for Piano and Orchestra was completed during a stay in Paris in 1910. Suite bretonne was performed at the Proms in August 1917. On 8 April 1937 she performed an orchestral piano concert for BBC Radio. In 1938 she raised the money for the restoration of the small church in the grounds of her home, Babington House, which is attributed to Sir Christopher Wren. On 28 April 1939 the BBC broadcast her playing from Babington House.

Around 1940, Bright began to work for the magazine Musical Opinion. Her association with the magazine coincided with a re-directing of its editorial policy onto a sternly reactionary course and a decline in readership.

She died at Babington in 1951 at the age of 89.

== Works ==
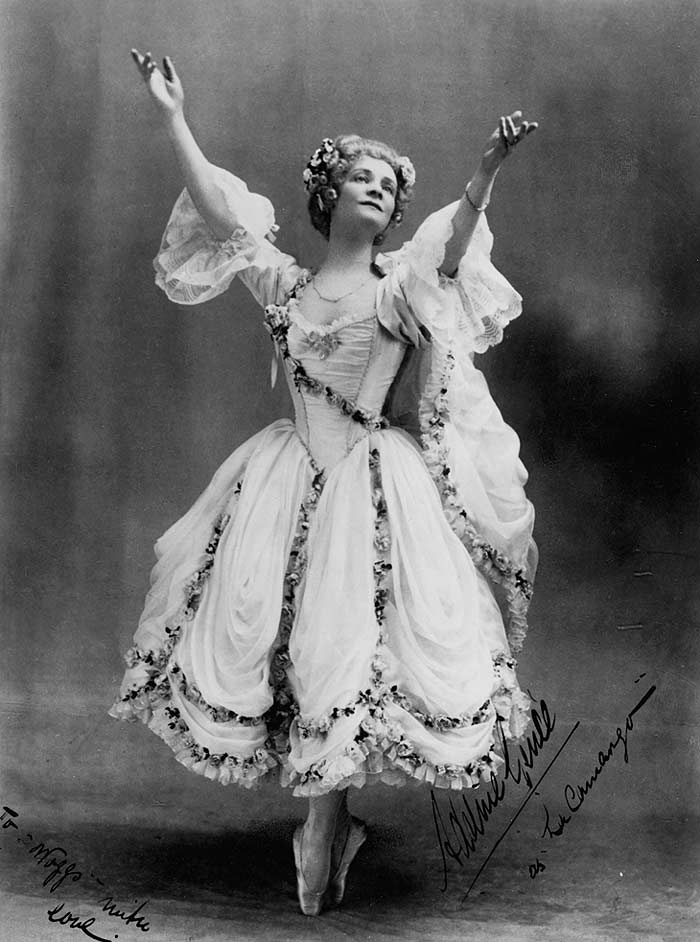
Genée in La Camargo, c. 1912

Many of her works have not survived. Selected works include:

Ballets

- The Dryad (25 March 1907, Playhouse Theatre, London)
- The Faun (10 October 1910, Empire Theatre of Varieties, London)
- La Camargo (20 May 1912, London Coliseum)
- La danse (17 December 1912, Metropolitan Opera, New York)
- A Dancer's Adventure (11 October 1915, London Coliseum)
- The Love Song (2 February 1933, London Coliseum)

Piano with orchestra

- Piano concerto in A minor (1888)
- Fantasia No 2 in G minor (1892)
- Variations for piano and orchestra (1910)

Orchestral

- Suite for orchestra (1891)
- Liebeslied for orchestra (1897)
- Concertstück for six timpani and orchestra (c. 1915)
- Suite bretonne for flute and orchestra (1917)

Instrumental and Chamber

- Air and Variations for String Quartet (1888)
- Five pieces for violin and piano, pub. Edwin Ashdown (1891)
- Romance and Seguidilla for flute and piano (1891)
- Variations on an Original Theme of Sir G. A. Macfarren, piano duet (1894)

Songs

- Twelve Songs (1889) (text by Shakespeare, Herrick and others)
- There Sits a Bird (1891), (text Thomas Ingoldsby), pub. Pitt & Hatzfeld
- Six Songs from the Jungle Book (1903) (text by Kipling) pub. Elkin & Co

Opera

- Quong Lung's Shadow (1903)
- The Portrait (1911)
