= Walter Cecil Macfarren =

English pianist, composer and conductor

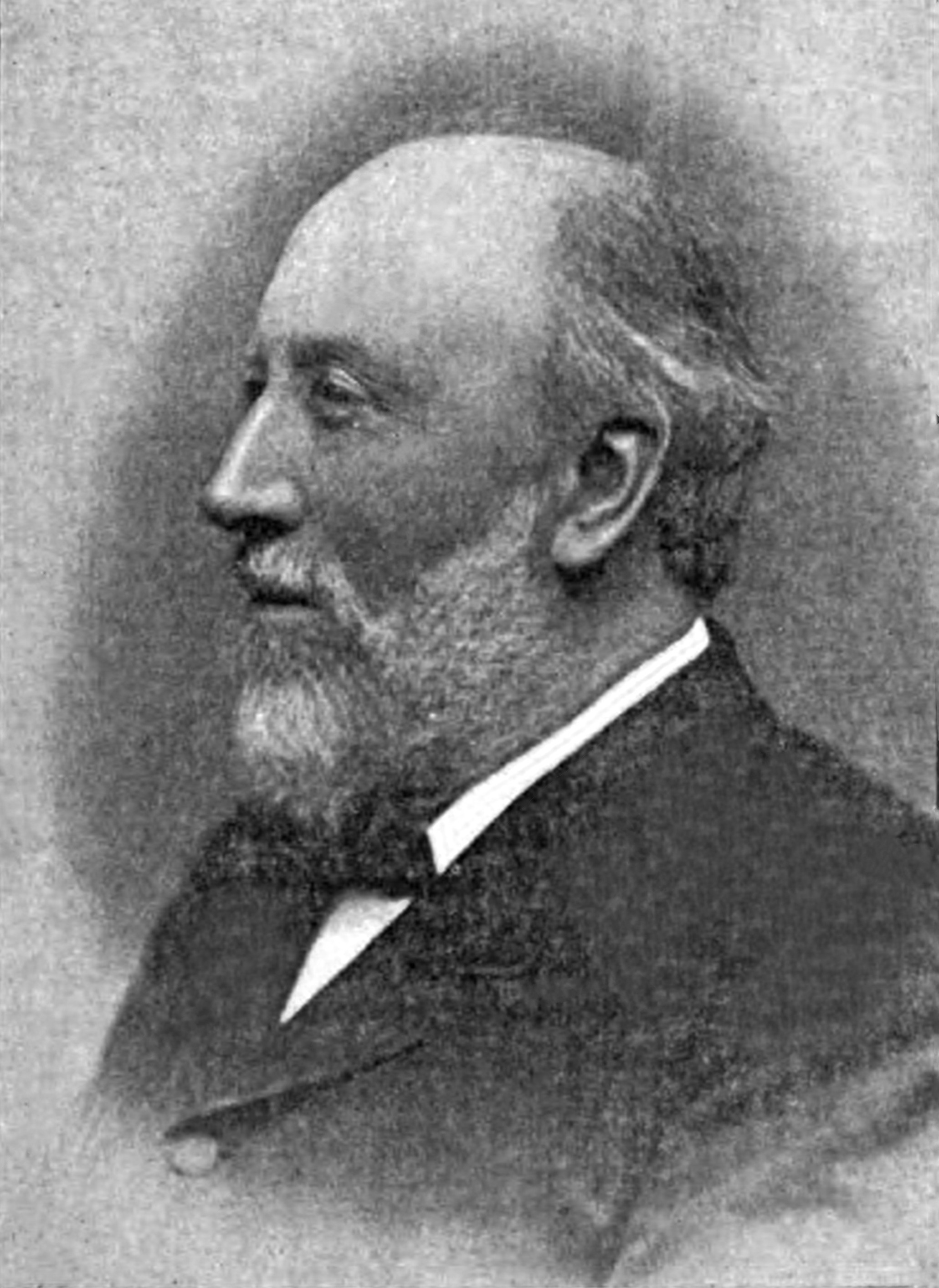
Walter Cecil Macfarren in 1893

Walter Cecil Macfarren (28 August 1826 – 20 September 1905) was an English pianist, composer and conductor, and a teacher at the Royal Academy of Music. His students included Stewart Macpherson, Tobias Matthay and Henry Wood.

== Early life ==
Macfarren was born in London in 1826, youngest son of the dramatist George Macfarren, and brother of the musician Sir George Alexander Macfarren. In his fourth year he showed gifts for music; he was a choir-boy at Westminster Abbey under James Turle (1836–41), and sang at the coronation of Queen Victoria. When his voice broke, he had thoughts of becoming an artist, and took some lessons in painting, and then served as salesman in a piano shop in Brighton.

At the persuasion of his brother, Macfarren entered the Royal Academy of Music in October 1842, studying the piano under W. H. Holmes and composition under his brother and Cipriani Potter.

== Career ==
In January 1846 Macarren became a Sub-professor of the pianoforte, and remained on the staff of the Royal Academy for fifty-seven years, for many years lecturing there six times annually and teaching the piano. His many pupils included Ethel Mary Boyce, Dora Bright, Llewela Davies, Stewart Macpherson, Tobias Matthay, Henry Wood and Agnes Zimmermann.

The assessment of the Dictionary of National Biography was that "He always remained a sound performer of the older school. He composed many small but solid piano pieces, natural, pleasing, and always highly finished in style, recalling Felix Mendelssohn and William Sterndale Bennett."

Macfarren's vocal works included two church services and many short secular pieces; the part-song "You stole my Love" was successful. He produced an overture to The Winter's Tale (1844); an overture to The Taming of the Shrew (1845); and Beppo, a concert overture (1847).

From 1873 to 1880 he conducted the concerts at the Royal Academy, and from 1877 to 1880 was treasurer of the Royal Philharmonic Society. Resuming the composition of large works, he produced with success at Wilhelm Kuhe's Brighton Festivals his Pastoral Overture (1878), Hero and Leander (1897), and a Symphony in B flat (1880).

A reviewer of the symphony wrote: "The merit of this composition is unquestionable, and nothing but a sustained manner of its own is wanting to place it, as a work of high pretension, beyond the pale of criticism. Mozart, Mendelssohn and Sterndale Bennett, however, continually peeping out, the impression is in a great degree what may be termed kaleidoscopic.... Apart from these considerations, the symphony is interesting throughout...."

In 1881 he wrote a concert-piece for piano and orchestra, written for his pupil Miss Kuhe, and the only large composition of his to be printed; and he produced an overture to Henry V at the Norwich Festival.

Macfarren was appointed musical critic to The Queen newspaper in 1862, and contributed articles until his death. For the music publishers Ashdown and Parry (afterwards Edwin Ashdown) he edited Popular Classics, which reached 240 numbers; he also edited Mozart's complete piano works and Beethoven's sonatas. His complete Scale and Arpeggio Manual appeared in 1882.

On the occasion of his jubilee in 1896 Macfarren founded two prizes, gold medals for pianoforte playing, at the Royal Academy. In 1904 he retired from all active work, save that of contributor to The Queen. He published in the summer of 1905 an autobiography, Memories.

== Personal life ==
Macfarren married Julia Fanner in 1852, the daughter of an artist: she died in 1902 without issue.

== Death ==
Macfarren died in London on 2 September 1905, and was buried in St Pancras and Islington Cemetery.
