= George Macfarren =

George Macfarren (1788–1843) was a playwright and the father of composer George Alexander Macfarren.

== Life ==
He was born in London 5 September 1788. He was the son of George Macfarren. He was educated chiefly at Archbishop Tenison's school in Castle Street, Leicester Square, and while there he wrote a tragedy which was privately played by his school-fellows, with the support of Edmund Kean, then a boy of their own age. Macfarren was also something of a musician, and according to his son, Sir G. Macfarren, "he could sustain either of the parts in a violin quartet," and "had he not met with a fashionable teacher of dancing, named Bishop, who offered to make him a gentleman instead of a fiddler, he would have adopted music as his profession".

He was the first teacher of James Oury the violinist, and while still under twenty years of age he opened a dancing academy of his own. In 1816, he visited Paris, where he had lessons in dancing from the best teachers. His natural bent was, however, towards the stage, and on 28 September 1818, his first publicly performed dramatic work, "Ah! what a Pity, or the Dark Knight and the Fair Lady," was given at the English Opera House (for the benefit of John Pritt Harley); from this date almost every year witnessed the production of some piece or other from his pen.

In February 1831, he took over the management of the theatre in Tottenham Street, which he called the Queen's Theatre, in honour of Queen Adelaide, and here he remained until July of the following year, producing, among numerous other works, a dramatic version of Handel's "Acis and Galatea," for which Cipriani Potter wrote additional accompaniments. Macfarren seems to have laid special stress upon accuracy of detail and naturalness in staging the plays which he produced. Robert Elliston, successively lessee of Drury Lane, the Olympic, and Surrey Theatres, stated that "no such perfect pictures as he saw at the Queen's Theatre had ever been put on the stage." Macfarren left the Queen's on being appointed stage-manager of the Surrey. He afterwards went to the Strand.

In 1834, he visited Milan, where his daughter was studying singing, and there wrote the libretto of an opera, "Caractacus." During some years of his life Macfarren was totally blind, but a year before his death he underwent an operation for cataract and recovered his sight. While blind he devoted himself largely to literature, and he first suggested the formation of the Handel Society. In 1841, he became editor and proprietor of the "Musical World." He died suddenly on 24 April 1843 in Castle Street, Leicester Square.

== Family ==
Macfarren married, in August 1808, Elizabeth (born 20 January 1792), daughter of John Jackson, a bookbinder, of Glasgow, who had settled in London. Their eldest son was Sir George Alexander Macfarren and their youngest Walter Cecil Macfarren.

== Works ==
- Ah! What a Pity, or, The Dark Knight and the Fair Lady (1818)
- Winning a Husband (1819)
- Guy Fawkes (1822)
- Edward the Black Prince (1823)
- Tom and Jerry in France (1823)
- George III (1824)
- The Horatii and Curiatii (1825)
- Auld Robin Gray (1828)
- March of Intellect (1829)
- The Danish Wife (1831)
- Innocent Sins (1838)

== Notes ==
Attribution

This article incorporates text from a publication now in the public domain: Legge, Robin Humphrey (1893). "Macfarren, George (1788-1843)". In Lee, Sidney (ed.). Dictionary of National Biography. Vol. 35. London: Smith, Elder & Co.
