= Francis William Davenport =

English musician and composer

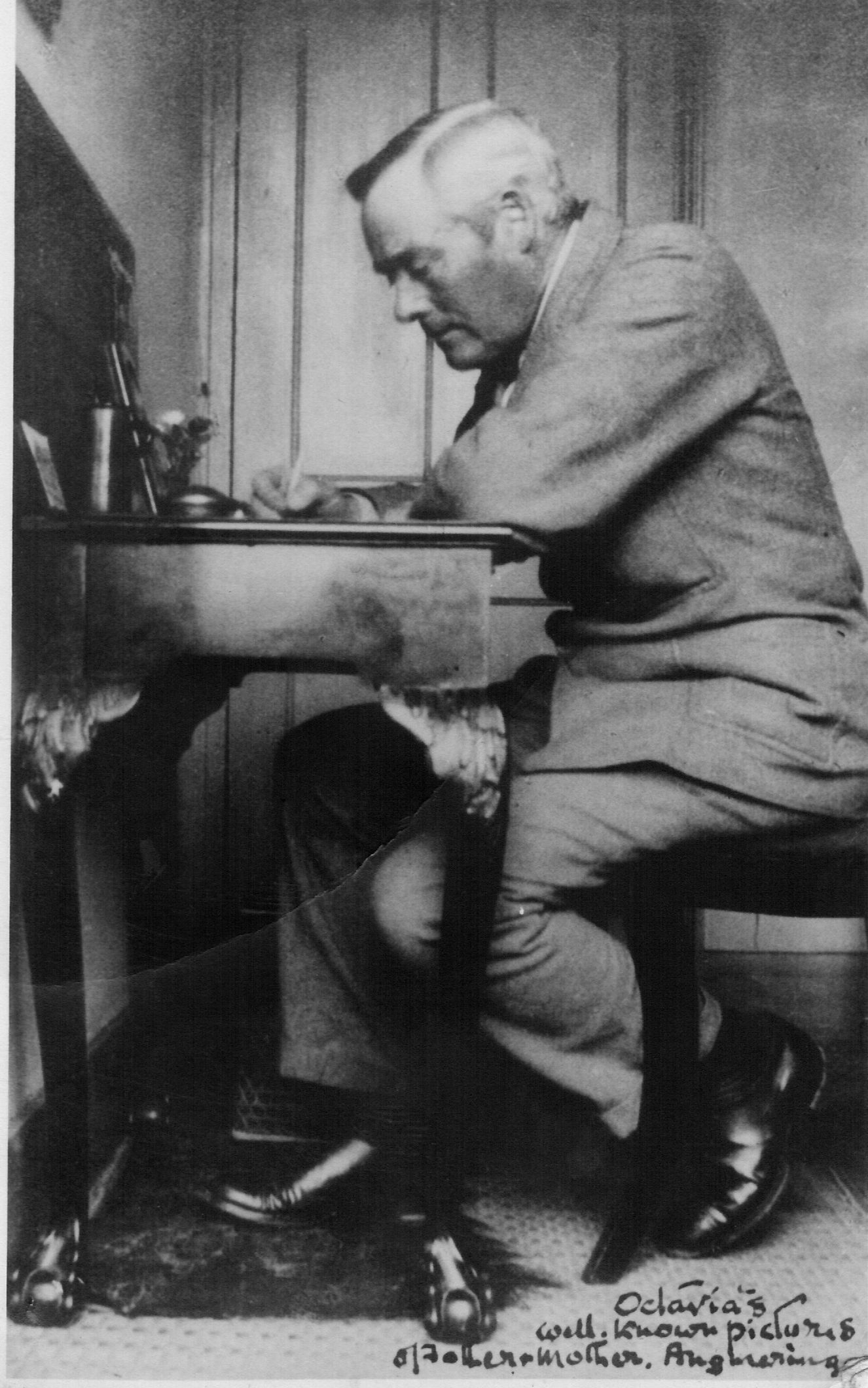
Francis William Davenport

Francis William Davenport (9 April 1847, Wilderslowe, near Derby - 1 April, 1925, York) was an English musician and composer.

He read law at University College, Oxford and from 1871 was a barrister of the Inner Temple. However, he changed his career to music, studying under George Alexander Macfarren. In 1873 he married Macfarren's daughter Clarina Thalia Macfarren (23 March 1848 - 10 July 1934). In 1879 he was appointed professor at the Royal Academy of Music. Then in 1882 he became a professor at the Guildhall School of Music. Davenport was honorary secretary of the Musical Association between 1883 and 1889.

He composed two symphonies, the first of which won the Crystal Palace Symphony Competition in 1876, beating Stanford’s First Symphony into second place. There was also an overture to Twelfth Night, heard at the Viard-Louis Concerts at St James's Hall on 18 February 1879, and a Prelude and Fugue for orchestra, performed at the Crystal Palace on 1 November 1879. He also composed chamber works, songs and partsongs. He produced the piano arrangements for the vocal scores of Macfarren's oratorios Joseph and King David.

Whilst teaching at the Royal Academy he taught harmony and counterpoint to Alicia Adélaide Needham, the mother of Joseph Needham and the first woman to conduct at the Royal Albert Hall. Other pupils included Ethel Mary Boyce, Percy Buck, Arthur Hinton, Amy Elsie Horrocks, Chester Edward Ide, Colin McAlpin, Percy Hilder Miles and Ellen Riley Wright.

The Davenports retired to Scarborough in 1914, where they lived in Avenue Victoria, South Cliff. He died in April 1925 at the age of 77 and was buried at Scarborough Cemetary after a memorial service at St Peter's Roman Catholic Church including his own music.

== Family ==
His son Robert Davenport (1875-1934, known as "Robin" or "Arthur") was a self-described "dramatic author", a writer and illustrator of children's stories, and popular song lyricist. He collaborated with H. G. Pelissier on an adaptation of The Follies. Robert's wife was the actress Muriel George. Francis Davenport's daughter Gertrude Mary Davenport (1879-1972) was a singer and journalist. She married Eden Paul, with whom she published many works under the name Cedar Paul. His nephew, Christopher Wilson, was a composer, conductor and music director for the theatre. His grandson John Davenport (son of Robert) was a critic and book reviewer who wrote for, amongst other publications, The Observer and The Spectator. John Davenport's son is the actor and author Roger Davenport.

== Works ==
- Symphony No 1 in D minor (1876)
- Symphony No 2 in G major
- Twelfth Night, overture for orchestra (1879)
- Prelude and Fugue for orchestra (1879)
- Piano Trio in Bb, op. 5 (1881)
- Six Pieces for piano and cello
- Five Pictures on a Journey, op. 3, suite for piano (1879)
- Variations on an original theme in G minor, op. 12 (1876)
- Many partsongs and songs

== Publications ==
- Elements of Music (1884)
- Elements of Harmony and Counterpoint (1886)
- A Guide for Pianoforte Students (with J. Percy Baker) (1891)
- Local Examinations in Music: Questions and Exercises for the Use of Students (with J. Percy Baker) (1891)
