= Emma Maria Macfarren =

English pianist and composer (1824–1895)

Emma Maria Macfarren (née Emma Marie Bennett) (19 June 1824 – 9 November 1895) was an English pianist and composer who used the pseudonym Jules Brissac.

She was born in London, and in 1846 married John Macfarren, brother of composer George Alexander Macfarren. She toured in the United States of America between 1862 and 1873 with her "Mornings at the Piano" lecture series and published a number of original songs and transcriptions. She died in London.

== Works ==
Macfarren was known for popular piano works. Selected works for piano under the pseudonym Jules Brissac include:

- Cerisette (1854), morceau de salon
- Léonie (1854), nocturne
- Paulina, Op. 19 (1855), nocturne
- Corinne, Op. 22 (1855), nocturne
- La vie et le rêve (1855), nocturne
- Olenka (1855), mazurka de salon
- Un moment de repos, Op. 30 (1856), nocturne
- Le passé et le présent, Op. 26 (1857)
- Couleur de rose, Op. 21 (1861), bluette
- Long ago, Op. 10 (1863), nocturne
- The Butterfly, Op. 97 (1863), caprice-étude
- The Village Bell, Op. 98 (1863), pastoral melody
- The Music of the Sea, Op. 104 (1863), caprice-nocturne
- The Babbling Brook, Le murmure du ruisseau (1865), caprice-étude
- Trois récréations (1865), polkas
- Valse de Bravoure (1870)
