= George Alexander Macfarren =

English composer and musicologist

George Alexander Macfarren

Sir George Alexander Macfarren (2 March 1813 – 31 October 1887) was an English composer and musicologist.

== Life ==
Walter Macfarren, his brother

George Alexander Macfarren was born in London on 2 March 1813 to George Macfarren, a dancing-master, dramatic author and journalist, who later became the editor of The Musical World, and Elizabeth Macfarren, née Jackson. At the age of seven, Macfarren was sent to Dr Nicholas's school in Ealing, where his father was dancing-master; the school numbered among its alumni John Henry Newman and Thomas Henry Huxley. His health was poor, however, and his eyesight weak, so much so that he was given a large-type edition of the Bible and had to use a powerful magnifying-glass for all other reading. He was withdrawn from the school in 1823 to undergo a course of eye treatment. The treatment was unsuccessful, and his eyesight progressively worsened until he became totally blind in 1860.

However, his blindness had little effect on his productivity. He overcame the difficulties posed by his lack of sight by employing an amanuensis in composition. One amanuensis was composer Oliveria Prescott.

On 27 September 1844, Macfarren married Clarina Thalia Andrae, subsequently known as Natalia Macfarren (1827–1916), an operatic contralto and pianist who was born in Lübeck. Trained at the Royal Academy of Music, she was successively a concert singer and singing teacher, as well as being a writer and a prolific translator of German poetry, songs (lieder) and operatic libretti into English. Her singing translation for the finale text of Beethoven's Symphony No. 9, the "Ode to Joy", became its most popular translation in England. She also composed for piano. Their daughter, Clarina Thalia Macfarren (23 March 1848 – 10 July 1934), married Francis William Davenport, one of George Macfarren's students.

His brother Walter Macfarren (28 August 1826 – 1905) was a pianist, composer and professor of the Royal Academy. Emma Maria Macfarren, the wife of another brother, John, was also a pianist and composer.

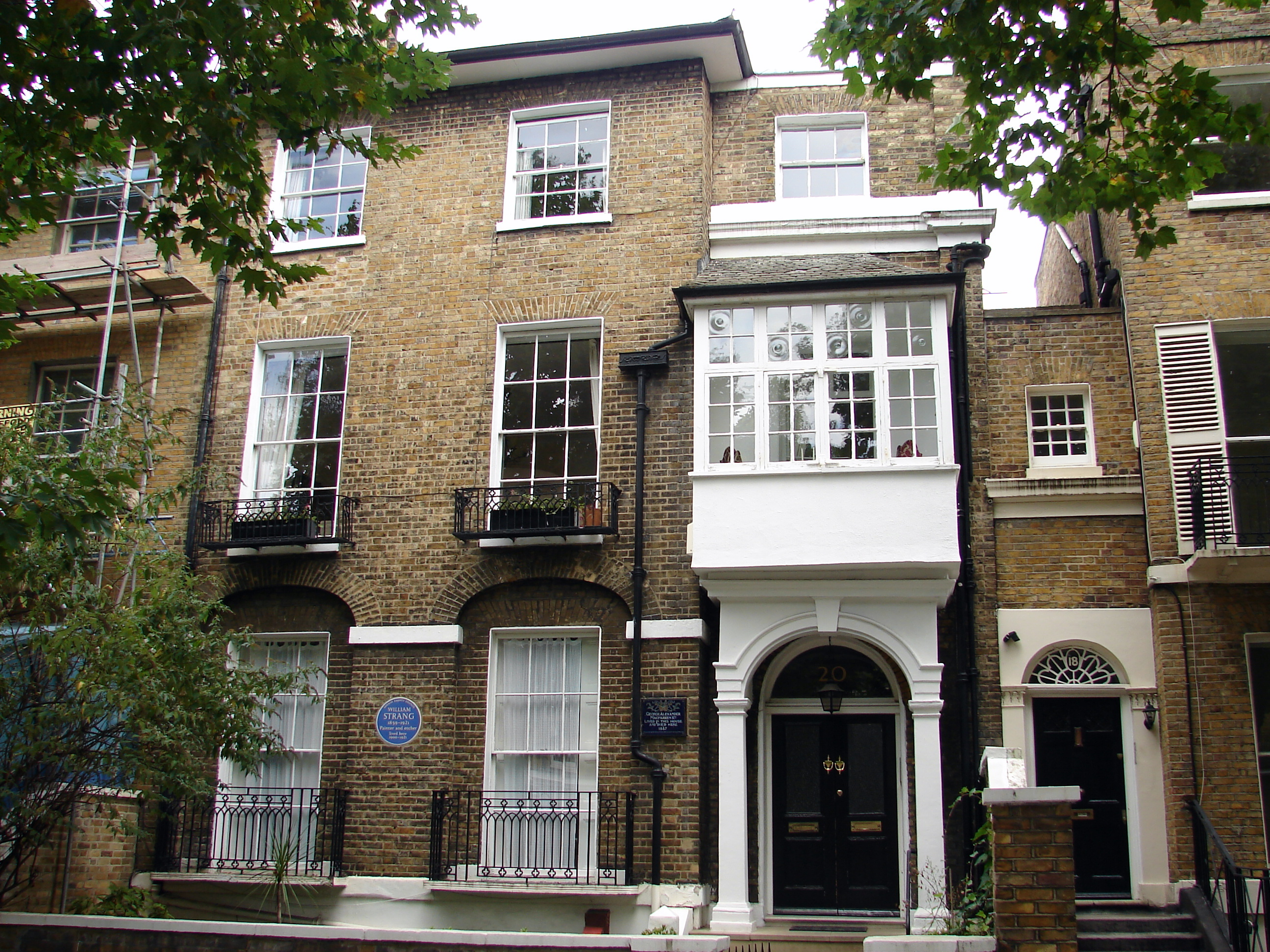
Macfarren's house in Hamilton Terrace, St John's Wood

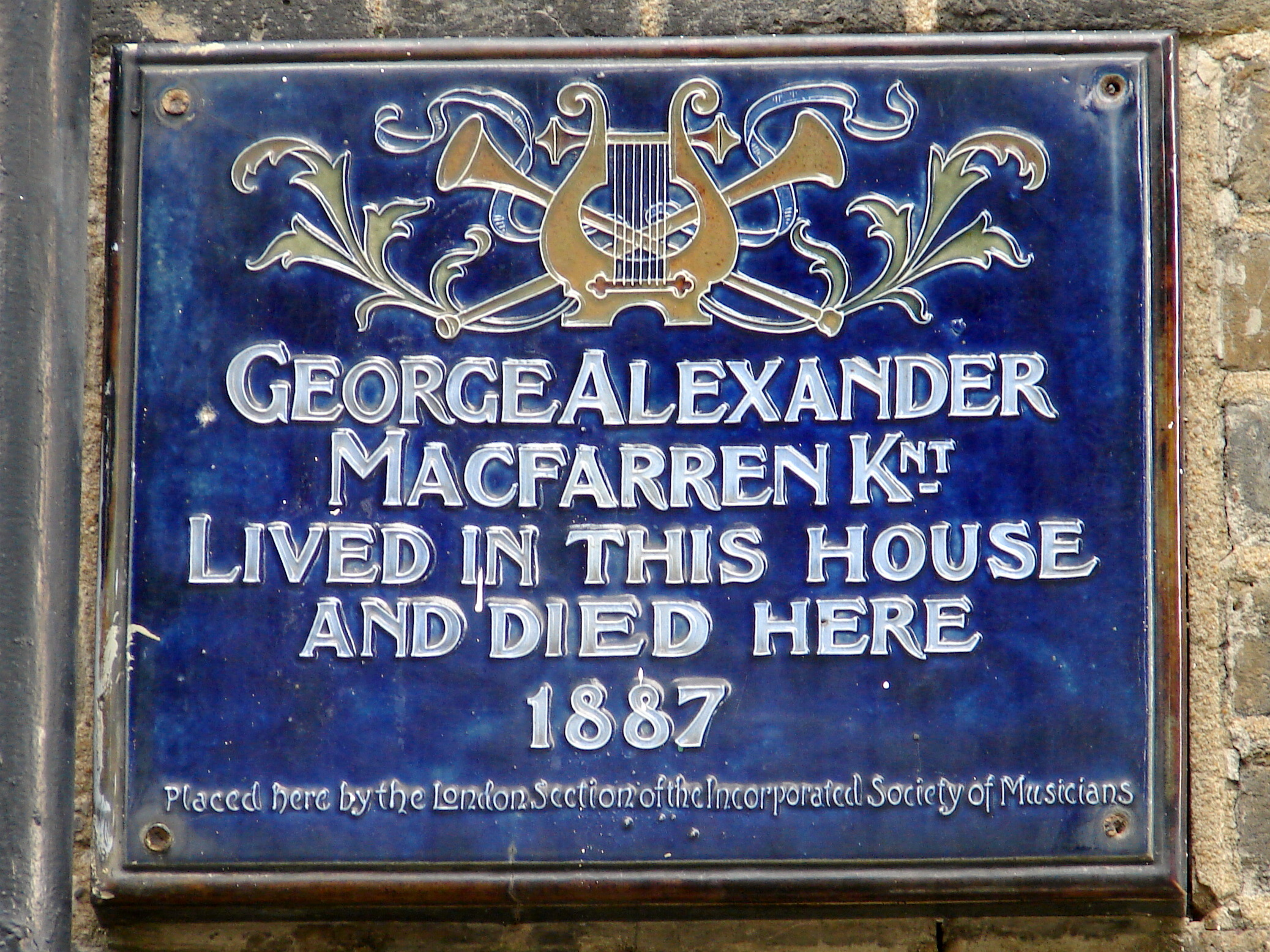
Plaque on the house

Macfarren was knighted in 1883. He lived with "chronic bronchitis and a weak heart" but refused to abate his working schedule, and died on 31 October 1887, at his house in Hamilton Terrace, St John's Wood. He is buried in Hampstead Cemetery.

=== Musical career ===
Macfarren began to study music when he was fourteen, under Charles Lucas. In 1829, at the age of sixteen, he entered the Royal Academy of Music, where he studied composition under Cipriani Potter as well as piano under William Henry Holmes and trombone with John Smithies. His ability to perform, however, was hindered by his poor eyesight and he soon concentrated upon composing only. In his first year at the academy, Macfarren composed his first work, the Symphony in F minor.

From 1834 to 1836 Macfarren taught at the academy without a professorship; he was appointed a professor in 1837. He resigned in 1847 when his espousal of Alfred Day's new theory of harmony became a source of dispute between him and the rest of the academy's faculty. In 1845, he became conductor at Covent Garden, producing the Antigone with Mendelssohn's music; his opera on Don Quixote was produced under Bunn at Drury Lane in 1846. Macfarren's eyesight had at that point deteriorated so significantly that he spent the next 18 months in New York to receive treatment from a leading oculist, but to no effect. He was re-appointed a professor at the academy in 1851, not because the faculty had any greater love for Day's theories, but because they decided that free thought should be encouraged. He succeeded Sir William Sterndale Bennett as principal of the academy in 1876. He was also appointed professor of music at Cambridge University in 1875, again succeeding Bennett.

Macfarren founded the Handel Society, which attempted to produce a collected edition of the works of George Frideric Handel (between 1843 and 1858). Among his theoretical works was an analysis of Beethoven's Missa solemnis (described as Beethoven's "Grand Service in D", and published in 1854); and a textbook on counterpoint (1881).

His overture "Chevy Chace" was performed on 26 October 1843 by the Leipzig Gewandhaus Orchestra conducted by Felix Mendelssohn.

Mendelssohn had heard it performed in London and wrote to the composer that he "liked it very much". After the Leipzig concert Mendelssohn wrote again to say "Your overture went very well, and was most cordially and unanimously received by the public, the orchestra playing it with true delight and enthusiasm".

Richard Wagner also admired the peculiar and wildly passionate character of the piece (which he described as the "Steeple Chase by MacFarrinc" in his diary). Wagner also described the overture's composer as "a pompous, melancholy Scotsman".

The "Chevy Chace" overture and two of his symphonies have been recorded.

Among Macfarren's operas were King Charles II, produced at the Princess's Theatre in 1849 (Natalia Macfarren made her operatic debut in this production), and an adaptation of Robin Hood produced in 1860. A recording by Victorian Opera was recorded in 2011. A recording of the two act chamber opera The Soldier's Legacy of 1864, scored for four soloists, piano and harmonium, was issued in 2023.

His oratorios brought him some popular and critical success. The most enduringly successful of these, St John the Baptist, was first performed in 1873 at the Bristol Festival. The Resurrection premiered in 1876, Joseph in 1877 and King David in 1883.

Macfarren also wrote chamber music, most notably the six string quartets that span over 40 years from 1834. Other chamber works include a piano trio in E minor, a piano quintet in G minor, sonatas for flute and violin, and three piano sonatas. Macfarren also composed for the concertina, a squeezebox button-accordion. His composition Romance and Allegro agitato for concertina, violin, viola, cello, and double bass was first performed by Richard Blagrove in 1854. Other compositions for concertina include the Barcarole (1856) and Violetta – A Romance (1859), both for concertina and piano. Macfarren also wrote an arrangement for the concertina and seven other instruments, of the second movement from Mendelssohn's Italian symphony.

== Compositions (selective list) ==
=== Orchestral ===
- 1828 – Symphony No. 1 in C (fp. Royal Academy of Music, London, September 1830)
- 1831 – Symphony No. 2 in D minor (fp. Royal Academy of Music, London, December 1831)
- 1832 – Symphony No. 3 in E minor
- 1832 – Overture in E♭ (fp. Royal Academy of Music, London, 26 June 1833)
- 1833 – Symphony No. 4 in F minor (fp. Society of British Musicians, London, 27 October 1834)
- 1833 – Symphony No. 5 in A minor
- 1834 – The Merchant of Venice, overture (fp. Society of British Musicians, London, October 1835)
- 1835 – Piano Concerto in C minor (fp. Society of British Musicians, London, 2 November 1835)
- 1835 – Concerto for Two Pianos in C major (jointly as a student with William Sterndale Bennett
- 1836 – Symphony No. 6 in B♭
- 1836 – Romeo and Juliet, overture
- 1836 – Concertino in A, for cello and orchestra
- 1836 – Chevy Chace, overture (fp. Society of British Musicians, London, 7 January 1838)
- 1839–40 – Symphony No. 7 in C♯ minor (fp. Philharmonic Society, London, 9 June 1845)
- 1842 – Don Carlos, overture
- 1845 – Symphony No. 8 in D
- 1856 – Hamlet, overture (fp. New Philharmonic Society, London, 23 April 1856)
- 1863 – Flute Concerto in G (fp. Hanover Square Rooms, London, 24 February 1864)
- 1873 – Violin Concerto in G minor (fp. Philharmonic Society, London, 12 May 1873)
- 1874 – Symphony No. 9 in E minor (fp. British Orchestral Society, London, 26 March 1874)
- 1874 – Festival Overture (fp. Liverpool Festival, 1874)
- 1875 – Idyll in Memory of Sterndale Bennett (fp. Philharmonic Society, London, 5 July 1875)

=== Choral and vocal ===
- 1853 – Lenora, cantata (fp. Exeter Hall, London, 25 April 1853)
- 1856 – May Day, cantata (fp. Bradford Festival, 28 August 1856)
- 1860 – Christmas, cantata (fp. Musical Society of London, 9 May 1860)
- 1867 - Two Songs with clarinet obbligato: 'A Widow Bird' (Shelley), 'Pack Clouds Away' (T. Heywood)
- 1868 – Songs in a Cornfield, cantata (fp. London, 1868)
- 1872 – Outward Bound, cantata (fp. Norwich Festival, 1872)
- 1873 – St John the Baptist, oratorio (fp. Bristol Festival, 23 October 1873)
- 1876 – The Resurrection, oratorio (fp. Birmingham Festival, 30 August 1876)
- 1876 – The Lady of the Lake, cantata (fp. Glasgow Choral Union, 15 November 1877)
- 1877 – Joseph, oratorio (fp. Leeds Festival, 21 September 1877)
- 1883 – King David, oratorio (fp. Leeds Festival, 12 October 1883)
- 1884 – St George's Te Deum (fp. Crystal Palace, London, 23 April 1884)
- 1887 – Around the Hearth, cantata (fp. Royal Academy of Music, London, 1887)

=== Operatic ===
- 1831 – Mrs G, farce (fp. Queen's Theatre, London, 1831)
- 1832 – Genevieve; or, The Maid of Switzerland, operetta (fp. Queen's Theatre, London, 1832)
- 1833 – The Prince of Modena, opera [unperformed]
- 1834 – Caractacus, opera [unperformed]
- 1835 – Old Oak Tree, farce (fp. Lyceum Theatre, London)
- 1835 – I and My Double, farce (fp. Lyceum Theatre, London, 16 June 1835)
- 1836 – If the Cap Fit Ye, Wear It, farce
- 1836 – Innocent Sins; or, Peccadilloes, operetta (fp. Coburg Theatre, London, August 1836)
- 1837–38 – El Malhechor, opera [unperformed]
- 1838 – The Devil's Opera, opera (fp. Lyceum Theatre, London, 13 August 1838)
- 1839 – Love Among the Roses, romance
- 1839 – Agnes Bernauer, the Maid of Augsburg, romance (fp. Covent Garden Theatre, London, 20 April 1839)
- 1840 – An Emblematic Tribute on the Queen's Marriage, masque (fp. Drury Lane Theatre, London, 10 February 1840)
- 1840–41 – An Adventure of Don Quixote, opera (fp. Drury Lane Theatre, London, 3 February 1846)
- 1847–48 – King Charles II, opera (fp. Princess's Theatre, London, 27 October 1849)
- c.1850 – Allan of Aberfeldy, opera [unperformed]
- 1850 – The Sleeper Awakened, serenata (fp. Her Majesty's Theatre, London, 15 November 1850)
- 1860 – Robin Hood, opera (fp. Her Majesty's Theatre, London, 11 October 1860)
- 1863 – Freya's Gift, allegorical masque (fp. Covent Garden Theatre, London, 10 March 1863)
- 1863 – Jessie Lea, opera di camera (fp. Gallery of Illustration, London, 2 November 1863)
- 1863–64 – She Stoops to Conquer, opera (fp. Covent Garden Theatre, London, 11 February 1864)
- 1864 – The Soldier's Legacy, opera di camera (fp. Gallery of Illustration, London, 10 July 1864)
- 1864 – Helvellyn, opera (fp. Covent Garden Theatre, London, 3 November 1864)
- 1880 – Kenilworth, opera [unperformed]

=== Chamber music ===
- 1834 – String Quartet No 1 in G minor
- 1840 – String Quartet No 2 in F major, Op. 54 (published Leipzig, 1846)
- 1842 – String Quartet No 3 in A major
- 1843–44 – Piano Quintet in G minor
- 1852 – String Quartet in G minor
- 1857 – Violin Sonata in E minor
- 1864 – Fantasia: Traditions of Shakespeare, variations for clarinet and piano
- 1872 – Religious March in E♭ major
- 1878 – String Quartet in G major
- 1880 – Piano Trio in A minor for flute, cello and piano
- 1883 – Flute Sonata

=== Piano ===
- 1842 – Piano Sonata No 1 in E♭ major (revised 1887)
- 1845 – Piano Sonata No 2 in A Ma cousine
- 1880 – Piano Sonata No 3 in G

=== Incidental music ===
- 1882 – Ajax (fp. Cambridge University, November 1882)

== Reputation ==
During his lifetime, Macfarren's music met with a mixed reception; "his views were often considered dogmatic and reactionary, but, unlike Grove, his theoretical and analytical expertise was indisputable." One contemporary called Macfarren "essentially a musical grammarian, engaged all his life long in settling the doctrine of the enclitic de." Those who thought highly of his work praised its originality and its tastefulness. According to a contemporary commentator, Macfarren "had great originality of thought and, as a composer, would probably have had still greater success if his early composition studies had been formed on the more modern lines to which he afterwards became so devotedly attached."

Salome's dance in St John the Baptist was praised for its avoidance of the salacious: "The whole of the scene is very cleverly worked out, and the composer has avoided anything inappropriate in the music descriptive of the dance, that might be considered out of place in an oratorio." Others, however, criticized the oratorio, arguing that "with all its very great and solid merit, can be said to be original in style only in virtue of the logical results of certain theories of harmony held by its composer." By the early twentieth century, Macfarren's works were no longer performed, a fact which the Worshipful Company of Musicians attributed to a lack of genius on Macfarren's part: "Never was more earnest composer, more prolific writer; never did man strive more zealously for the art of his country; yet Heaven had endowed him only with talent and not genius."

Modern commentators generally consider Macfarren to be "the most eminent representative" of conservatism in orchestration. His Ajax has been called "professionally composed if uninspiring" and his writing for trumpet singled out as "conventional ... although he does make liberal use of the out-of-tune harmonics, especially b [flat]', he rarely uses notes outside the harmonic series and rarely writes the first trumpet part above the first treble staff." Macfarren's music is "capable of graceful lyricism, [but] what may be a desire to avoid cliches in the songs leads him at times to an unexpected angularity of line that seems more awkward than fresh. However, Macfarren's St John the Baptist has been praised as "an original and imaginative piece in which the shadow of Mendelssohn, so prominent since the appearance of Elijah in 1846, is only occasionally perceptible."
