= List of works commissioned by the Royal Philharmonic Society =

The Royal Philharmonic Society has commissioned new works to composers since 1813. Most notable pieces commissioned by the Society are Beethoven's Symphony No. 9, Felix Mendelssohn's Symphony No.4 and Antonín Dvořák's Symphony No.8.

This is a list of compositions commissioned by the RPS or dedicated to the Royal Philharmonic Society (London) since 1813.

1814

- L. Berger: Overture
- Cherubini: Overture

1815

- Cherubini: Overture in G
- Cherubini: Symphony in D
- Ries: Symphony

1816

- Ries: Bardic Overture
- Klengel: Piano Quintet
- Potter: Overture
- Ries: Symphony No.3 in Eb
- Müller: Clarinet Quintet
- J. F. Burrowes: Overture
- Cherubini: Cantata La Primavera
- Clementi: Symphony
- Potter: Septet for piano, flute and strings
- Fémy: Symphony in E minor

1817

- Burghersh: Symphony

1819

- Ries: Scena Sia Luminosa

1821

- Spohr: Overture in F
- Bochsa: Septet for harp, wind and double bass

1825

- Beethoven: Symphony No.9

1832

- Neukomm: Septet (Fantasia Concertante) for wind and double bass
- Onslow: Symphony

1833

- Cramer: Piano Quintet in Bb
- Moscheles: Grand Septet for piano, strings, clarinet and horn
- Mendelssohn: Symphony No.4 in A (Italian)
- Hummel: Piano Concerto in F
- Neukomm: Fantasia Dramatica on Paradise Lost
- Potter: Symphony in A minor
- Mendelssohn: Trumpet Overture in C

1834

- H. R. Bishop: Cantata The Seventh Day
- Vincent Novello: Dramatic Cantata Rosalba
- Horsley: Motet Exultabo Te
- Mendelssohn: Concert Aria Infelice (op.94)

1835

- Herz: Piano Concerto No. 3 in D minor

1836

- H. R. Bishop: Cantata The Departure from Paradise

1848

- Spohr: Symphony No.8 in G major

1862

- Bennett: Overture Paradise and the Peri

1864

- Bennett: Symphony in G minor

1867

- Sullivan: Overture Marmion

1868

- Barnett: Overture symphonique
- Benedict: Overture La selva incantata

1872

- Bennett: Prelude Ajax

1875

- Macfarren: Idyll in Memory of Sterndale Bennett

1881

- Cowen: Sinfonietta in A minor

1883

- King: Overture Among the Pines

1885

- Mielck: Dramatische Ouverture
- Wingham: Serenade for Orchestra

1886

- Gadsby: Scene The Forest of Arden
- Saint-Saëns: Symphony No.3 in C "Organ"
- Moszkowski: Suite for orchestra

1887

- Corder: Suite Roumanian
- Randegger: Scena Prayer of Nature

1895

- Parry: Symphony No.3 in F (revised)

1896

- Dvořák: Five Biblical Songs with orchestra

1898

- MacCunn: Ballet music from Diarmid

1907

- Tivadar Nachéz: 2ème Concerto pour Violon (si mineur) op. 36

1910

- Luigi Mancinelli: Romantic Overture

1917

- German: Song Have you news of my boy Jack?

1950

- Rawsthorne: Symphony

1958

- Vaughan Williams: Symphony No.9

1963

- Walton: Variations on a Theme of Hindemith

1966

- Hoddinott: Variants for Orchestra

1969

- Musgrave: Clarinet Concerto

1970

- Lutosławski: Cello Concerto

1971

- Joubert: Symphony No.2

1975

- Cooke: Symphony No.4

1982

- Simpson: Symphony No.8

1985

- Musgrave and Bennett: Moving into Aquarius

1987

- Andrzej Panufnik: Symphony No.9
- Burgon: Song cycle Title Divine

1989

- Arnold: Cello Concerto

1992

- Saxton: Paraphrase on Mozart's Idomeneo

2000

- Jonathan Cole: Ouroboros

2001

- Luke Bedford: Five Abstracts, winner of the RPS Composition Prize
- Judith Bingham: Fifty Shades of GreenZ
- Burgon: Heavenly Things
- Simon Holt: Two Movements for String Quartet

2002

- Brett Dean: Huntington Eulogy
- John Woolrich: Darker Still
- David Gorton: Oblique Prayers, winner of the RPS Composition Prize

2003

- Richard Rodney Bennett: Songs before Sleep
- Elliott Carter: Of Rewaking
- Jonathan Dove: Run to the Edge
- Detlev Glanert: Three Pieces
- David Lang: Breathless
- John Hails: Lovesongs, winner of the RPS Composition Prize
- Leon Kirchner: Interlude II
- Simon Mawhinney: Darby's Loanin, winner of the RPS Composition Prize
- Julian Philips: Four Characters Eric Tanguy: Quattro Intermezzi
- Karin Rehnqvist: Beginning
- Augusta Read Thomas: Pulsar

2004

- Brian P. Herrington: Symphonia for the London Sinfonietta, winner of the RPS Composition Prize
- Phillip Neil Martin: An Outburst of Time for the Cheltenham Festival, winner of the RPS Composition Prize
- Dai Fujikura: Be

2005

- Dai Fujikura: Another Place for the Cheltenham Festival, winner of the RPS Composition Prize
- Lyell Cresswell: Ara Kopikopiko, winner of the RPS Composition Prize

2006

- Hugh Wood: Wild Cyclamen, Op.49
- Emily Hall: My Dirty Little Heart, winner of the RPS Composition Prize
- Christopher Mayo: Passed the Last River, winner of the RPS Composition Prize
- Anders Nordentoft: Parasto
- Mark-Anthony Turnage: Two Baudelaire Songs
- Django Bates: Alison in Space
- Ian Wilson: Red Over Black
- Huw Watkins: Partita

2007

- Eleanor Alberga: Succubus Moon
- Dominick Argento: Three Sonnets of Petrarch
- Deirdre Gribbin: Calum's Light
- Philippe Hersant: In Black
- Mark Bowden, winner of the RPS Composition Prize
- Charlie Piper, winner of the RPS Composition Prize
- Stuart MacRae: Unity
- Joseph Phibbs: Flex
- Julian Philips: Four Characters

2008

- Cheryl Frances-Hoad: My Day in Hell, winner of the RPS Composition Prize
- Alexander Goehr: Since Brass, nor Stone...
- Dominic Muldowney: Tsunami
- Gwilym Simcock: Contours
- Tristan Rhys Williams: "Kapur", winner of the RPS Composition Prize

2009

- Dobrinka Tabakova: Suite in Jazz Style
- Gwilym Simcock: Contours
- Alexander Goehr: Since Brass, nor Stone
- Claudia Molitor: Alert
- Benjamin Cox: In Memoriam
- Evis Sammoutis: Night, again, winner of the RPS Composition Prize
- Sasha Siem: From the White Dictionary, winner of the RPS Composition Prize
- Tom Arthurs: And Distant Shore, winner of the RPS Composition Prize

2010

- Martin Suckling: To see the dark between (Aronowitz Ensemble, Wigmore Hall) - RPS Composition Prize
- Dimitris Economou: Metamorphosis (members of the Philharmonia, Patrick Bailey - conductor) - RPS Composition Prize
- Shiva Feshareki: out of sorts (members of the Philharmonia, Patrick Bailey - conductor) - RPS Composition Prize
- Michael Langemann: Epode for string quartet (Solstice Quartet, Cheltenham Music Festival) - RPS Composition Prize, supported by the Susan Bradshaw Composers' Fund
- Christian Mason: Looking for the Land that is Nowhere (Lydia Kavina, theremin, members of the Philharmonia, Patrick Bailey - conductor) - RPS Composition Prize

2011

- Dario Palermo: The Difference Engine (score for dance work, 12 October 2011) - RPS Drummond Fund
- Darren Bloom:: Three (Manus Noble - guitar) - RPS Composition Prize, supported by the Susan Bradshaw Composers' Fund
- Charlotte Bray: Replay (Festival Academy Soloists: Alexandra Wood - violin, Cian O’Duill - viola, Robin Michael - cello, Huw Watkins - piano, Cheltenham Festival) - RPS Composition Prize, supported by the Susan Bradshaw Composers' Fund
- Steven Daverson: Schattenwanderer (Mark van der Wiel - clarinet, members of the Philharmonia, Clark Rundell - conductor) - RPS Composition Prize
- Edward Nesbit: Concerto for violin and ensemble (Maya Iwabuchi - violin, members of the Philharmonia, Clark Rundell - conductor) - RPS Composition Prize
- Mark Simpson: Lethe (Byron Fulcher - trombone, members of the Philharmonia, Clark Rundell - conductor) - RPS Composition Prize

2012

- Stef Conner: Arranging Old Silks (Philharmonia MOT 2012) - RPS Composition Prize
- David Curington: Nine Accumulations (Philharmonia MOT 2012) - RPS Composition Prize
- Philip Dawson: Heath’s Contraption (Philharmonia MOT 2012) - RPS Composition Prize
- Lauri Supponen: The Dordrecht Humaphone (BBC Singers, Cheltenham Festival 2012) - RPS Composition Prize, supported by the Susan Bradshaw Composers' Fund

Tom Harrold Locked Horns (Total Brass, 17 May 2012)

2013

- Poul Ruders: String Quartet No 4 (Premiered at the Barbican centre by the Vertavo Quartet 9 March 2013)
- Jonathan Lloyd: Old Racket (for strings)

(Premiered on Friday 12 April 2013 at the Barbican Centre by the BBC Symphony Orchestra, conducted by Sir Andrew Davis)

- Jonathan Lloyd: New Balls (for winds)

(Premiered on Friday 17 May 2013 at the Barbican Centre by the BBC Symphony Orchestra, conducted by James Gaffigan)

- Judith Weir: I give you the end of a golden string (premiered on 8 June at the Aldeburgh Festival by Britten Sinfonia, conducted by Ryan Wigglesworth)
- Sally Beamish, Charlotte Bray, Anna Meredith, Thea Musgrave: Innocence and Experience (premiered on 9 June at the Aldeburgh Festival by the New London Children's Choir, conducted by Ronald Corp)
- Harrison Birtwistle: Songs from the Same Earth (premiered on 13 June by tenor Mark Padmore and pianist Andrew West)
- Julian Philips: Maxamorphosis (score for dance, May 2013) - RPS Drummond Fund
- Magnus Lindberg: Red House (premiered on 22 June at the Aldeburgh Festival by Birmingham Contemporary Music Group, conducted by Oliver Knussen)
- Wolfgang Rihm: A Tribute (Über die Linie VIII) (Halle Orchestra, conducted by Mark Elder)
- Kenneth Hesketh: Forms Entangled, Shapes Collided (score for dance work, Repetition of Change, February 2013) - RPS Drummond Fund
- Huw Watkins: Little Symphony (David Curtis, conductor; Orchestra of the Swan, 21 June 2013) - Composer in the House.
- Mark-Anthony Turnage: Frieze (RPS, BBC Radio 3 and New York Philharmonic co-commission - premiere: BBC Proms, 11 August 2013)
- Tom Coult: (Philharmonia MOT June 2013) - RPS Composition Prize
- Arne Gieshoff: Ad Bestias (Philharmonia MOT June 2013) - RPS Composition Prize
- Christopher McAteer: Casement (Philharmonia MOT June 2013) - RPS Composition Prize
- David Onac: String Quartet No.6 (Carducci Quartet, Cheltenham Music Festival) - RPS Composition Prize, supported by the Susan Bradshaw Composers' Fund
- Robert Peate: Pearl (Clare Hammond piano, Presteigne Festival 2013) - RPS Composition Prize, Presteigne Festival Alan Horne Memorial commission
- Bertie Baigent: Joie de Vivre (RPS Fanfare Commissions; brass players of the NYO, Mathew Coorey - conductor, 11 August 2013)
- Tom Harrold: Fanfaronade (RPS/IAMA Fanfare Commission; Buzz Brass, 7 November 2013)
- Benjamin Graves: Le Science de Monsieur Berlioz (Players from GSMD, 1 November 2013)
- Joshue Kaye: Le Science de Monsieur Berlioz (Players from GSMD, 1 November 2013)
- Ella Jarman-Pinto: Le Science de Monsieur Berlioz (Players from GSMD, 1 November 2013)
- Aled Smith: Uncertain Light (Alexandra Dariescu, piano, November 2013)

2014

- Matthew Kaner: Mosaic (Philharmonia MOT June 2014) - RPS Composition Prize
- Michael Cutting: I am a strange loop II (Philharmonia MOT June 2014) - RPS Composition Prize
- Samantha Fernando: Sense of Place (Philharmonia MOT June 2014) - RPS Composition Prize
- Daniel Kidane: Spear (Kate Romanom clarinet & Richard Uttley, piano, Presteigne Festival 2014) - RPS Composition Prize, Presteigne Festival Alan Horne Memorial commission
- Tom Stewart: Flying Kites Concentric Ceilings (Fidelio Trio, Cheltenham Festival 2014) - RPS Composition Prize, supported by the Susan Bradshaw Composers' Fund
- Dobrinka Tabakova PULSE (score for film in collaboration with film-maker Ruth Paxton, February 2014)
- Huw Watkins: Remember (Ruby Hughes, soprano; David Curtis, conductor and Orchestra of the Swan, 30 May 2014 Stratford-upon-Avon, Civic Hall) As part of Composer in the House.

2015

- Ed Scolding: Brut (in collaboration with Peter Groom; BFI Southbank, for SOUND:VISION)
- Dani Howard: Visions (in collaboration with Victoria Fiore; BFI Southbank, for SOUND:VISION)
- Joe Jackson: At First Sight (in collaboration with Chloe Wicks; BFI Southbank, for SOUND:VISION)
- Theo Vidgen: Swan Song for Four Cellos (in collaboration with Sophie Barrott; BFI Southbank, for SOUND:VISION)
- Sarah Lianne Lewis: Palimpsest (in collaboration with Christopher Lutterodt-Quarcoo; BFI Southbank, for SOUND:VISION)
- Huw Watkins: Envoi (Orchestra of the Swan, David Curtis - conductor, for Composer in the House)
- Nicholas Morrish: Abandonment and Ruin (Kokoro, for Cheltenham Music Festival) - RPS Composition Prize, supported by the Susan Bradshaw Composers' Fund
- Samuel Bordoli: As I Lay Dying (Philharmonia players, Royal Festival Hall) - RPS Composition Prize
- Oliver Leith: Craquelure (Philharmonia players, Royal Festival Hall) - RPS Composition Prize
- Nicholas Stuart: Very Small Symphony (Philharmonia players, Royal Festival Hall) - RPS Composition Prize
- Elizabeth Ogonek: Falling Up (Ensemble 360, Music in the Round) - RPS Composition Prize
- Michael Small: White Space(Fenella Humphreys - violin, for Presteigne Festival) - RPS Composition Prize
- Jonathan Dove: Nights Not Spent Alone (Kitty Whately - mezzo-soprano, Simon Lepper - piano, for Cheltenham Festival) - co-commission with BBC for New Generation Artists
- Elena Kats-Chernin: Material Men (Smith Quartet, Queen Elizabeth Hall) - RPS Drummond Fund commission
- Kerry Andrew: writing on the NHS (London Sinfonietta players, part of Southbank Centre's Notes to the New Government)
- Jordan Hunt: writing on the power of optimism (London Sinfonietta players, part of Southbank Centre's Notes to the New Government)
- Gavin Higgins: writing on the impact of the bedroom tax (London Sinfonietta players, part of Southbank Centre's Notes to the New Government)
- Benjamin Oliver and poet Luke Wright writing on loneliness and isolation (London Sinfonietta players, part of Southbank Centre's Notes to the New Government)
- Emma-Ruth Richards writing on sex trafficking (London Sinfonietta players, part of Southbank Centre's Notes to the New Government)
- Naomi Pinnock: Lines and Spaces (Richard Uttley - piano, Huddersfield Contemporary Music Festival)

2016

- John Casken: Serpents of Wisdom (Alec Frank-Gemmill - horn, Alasdair Beatson, piano, Wigmore Hall) - co-commission with BBC for New Generation Artists
- Julian Anderson: Incantesimi (Berlin Philharmoniker, Sir Simon Rattle - conductor)
- Patrick John Jones: Locks of the Approaching Storm (Philharmonia players, Diego Masson - conductor, Royal Festival Hall) - RPS Composition Prize
- Desmond Clarke: Xyla (Philharmonia players, Diego Masson - conductor, Royal Festival Hall) - RPS Composition Prize
- Michael Taplin: Lambent Fires (Philharmonia players, Diego Masson - conductor, Royal Festival Hall) - RPS Composition Prize
- Kurt Schwertsik: Eine Windrose für Mauricio (Narek Hakhnazaryan - cello, Cheltenham Music Festival) - co-commission with BBC for New Generation Artists
- Hunter Coblentz: Trio (Fidelio Trio, Cheltenham Music Festival) - RPS Composition Prize, supported by the Susan Bradshaw Composers' Fund
- David Sawer: April \ March (London Sinfonietta, Andrew Gourlay - conductor, BBC Proms) - RPS Drummond Fund commission
- Rolf Wallin: (Danish String Quartet, Edinburgh International Festival) - co-commission with BBC for New Generation Artists
- Ninfea Cruttwell-Reade: Ravens' Cage (Emily Pailthorpe - clarinet, Clare Hammond, piano, for Presteigne Festival) - RPS Composition Prize
- Sally Beamish: Merula Perpetua (Lise Berthaud - viola, David Saudubray - piano, BBC Proms) - co-commission with BBC for New Generation Artists
- Dani Howard Ostara: (Ensemble 360, for Music in the Round) - RPS Composition Prize
- Francisco Coll: Chanson et Bagatelle (Peter Moore - trombone, Richard Uttley - piano) - co-commission with BBC for New Generation Artists
- Manfred Trojahn: Sonata V (Annelien Van Wauwe - clarinet, Nino Gvetadze - piano) - co-commission with BBC for New Generation Artists
- Johannes Fischer: Canons and Sparrows (Armida Quartet) - co-commission with BBC for New Generation Artists
- Michael Nyman: Two Sonnets for Sor Juana Inés de la Cruz (Kathryn Rudge - mezzo-soprano, James Baillieu - piano) - co-commission with BBC for New Generation Artists
