= European Composer and Songwriter Alliance =

European international non-profit organization

- Abbreviation: ECSA
- Formation: 7 March 2007
- Headquarters: Brussels, Belgium
- Key people: Helienne Lindvall (President); Alfons Karabuda (Honorary President); Marc du Moulin (Secretary General)
- Website: composeralliance.org

The European Composer and Songwriter Alliance (ECSA) is an international, non-profit organization based in Brussels, Belgium, and formed by 57 associations of composers and songwriters from 28 different European countries. It represents around 30,000 music creators and was founded in 2007. ECSA is co-financed by the Creative Europe programme of the European Union.

ECSA is a European network whose main objective is to defend and promote the rights of music authors on a national, European, and international level. The Alliance advocates for equitable commercial conditions for composers and songwriters and strives to improve the social and economic development of music creation in Europe.

The three main genres of music composition are represented within ECSA in three different committees (APCOE, ECF, and FFACE) representing, respectively: popular music, art and contemporary music, and film and audiovisual music. The current President of ECSA is Helienne Lindvall, who was re-elected to this position in March 2025, after having served for a first term since 2022.

== History ==
The foundation for ECSA was laid on 4 February 2006, when a group of 100 composers from over 30 European countries met at the European Composers' Congress at Musikverein in Vienna, Austria, to sign a letter of intent in order to create a "Federation of European Composers Association". On 7 March 2007, three associations, the Alliance of Popular Composer Organizations in Europe (APCOE), European Composers' Forum (ECF), and the Federation of Film and audiovisual Composers of Europe (FFACE), came together in Madrid, Spain, to form the European Composer and Songwriter Alliance (ECSA).

== Structure ==
ECSA is organized into three committees based on music genre: the Alliance of Popular Music Composers of Europe (APCOE), the European Composers Forum (ECF), and the Federation of Film and Audiovisual Composers of Europe (FFACE). The board of ECSA is made up of 9 members, three from each of the committees. The current president, chosen from these 9 members, is Helienne Lindvall from the APCOE committee.

== Advocacy ==
ECSA actively defends the value of authors’ rights and the interests of music creators towards various public institutions and different stakeholders. The Alliance aims at creating a fair and sustainable framework for creators as well as ensuring an appropriate and proportionate remuneration for all music authors. ECSA is also active at international level and is a member of the European Music Council (EMC) and the International Music Council (IMC), and a partner of the International Council of Music Creators (CIAM). Furthermore, the Alliance monitored the work and discussions held at the World Intellectual Property Organization (WIPO), though its observer status was removed in 2021.

=== Artificial Intelligence ===
Artificial Intelligence (AI)'s rapid developments and its impact on authors’ rights has become an increasingly urgent topic for ECSA. AI has therefore been put at centre stage of ECSA's advocacy efforts, with a particular focus on the EU AI Act, which was formally adopted by the European Parliament on 13 March 2024, after a lengthy negotiation period. In this context, ECSA has repeatedly stressed the necessity to preserve fundamental rights, safeguard transparency, and enable authors and performers to exercise their rights. In various open letters and statements, the Alliance has advocated for legislation built upon informed consent, transparency, and fair remuneration for creators.

=== Music streaming ===
Making music streaming sustainable for composers and songwriters is a key priority for ECSA. The Alliance and its member organizations have denounced the extremely low level of remuneration coming from music streaming platforms. ECSA calls on policymakers and stakeholders to remedy the fundamental flaws and market failures of the music streaming market for music creators, cultural diversity and European citizens alike.

In July 2023, ECSA published its vision on music streaming, which includes six major recommendations to fix streaming and make it sustainable for music creators and artists. In the document, ECSA calls on policy makers and all stakeholders in the music industry to assess the functioning of the streaming market and actively promote a fairer and transparent ecosystem, one that values and fairly compensates creators and artists for their crucial contributions.

=== Contractual practices ===
ECSA advocates for fairer contracts between music authors and their contractual counterparts. In this regard, ECSA stands firmly against so called buyout contracts as they are often a take-it-or-leave-it deal, where the music author sells all his or her rights of the musical work and correspondingly future royalties in connection to that work.

In January 2025, ECSA published its Report on Audiovisual Composers' Contracts. Drawing on consultations with its members, the report outlines and denounces various harmful and persistent contractual challenges faced by European audiovisual composers, such as buyout contracts and work-for hire provisions, pseudo-publishing, and the waiving of moral rights. The report also provides seven key recommendations to tackle these practices.

=== The Creators Conference ===
The Creators Conference provides a high-level platform for discussion and exchange of ideas on the various challenges facing creators in the music sector, as well as the creative and cultural industries in general. The first conference was held in 2012 and that year, ECSA and the Creators Conference were presented the Visit Brussels Award at International Congress 2012. The 2025 edition of the Creators Conference was held on 25 March 2025 at the European Parliament in Brussels.

=== ECSA Manifesto ===
In October 2024, ECSA published its Manifesto, outlining the abovementioned advocacy priorities. With the Manifesto, the Alliance seeks to effectively champion the needs and priorities of music authors, helping to shape policies that support the growth and sustainability of the whole music sector.

== Cultural Activities ==
=== Camille Awards ===
The Camille Awards (or European Film Composer Awards) are a set of awards given to composers of exceptional pieces of film and audiovisual music. The first Camille Awards ceremony was held in 2014 and was an initiative by ECSA Honorary Vice-President Bernard Grimaldi.

The 2024 edition of the Camille Awards took place on 13 November 2024 at the Bibliothèque nationale de France in Paris, France. Award winners included Alfonso de Vilallonga (Spain), Anna Rice (Ireland), Blair Mowat (United Kingdom), and Miriam Cutler (United States).

=== ECCO ===
ECCO (European Contemporary Composers Orchestra) is an ECSA project dedicated to performing and promoting contemporary art music as well as reaching new audiences. It operates as a network of active ensembles, orchestras and young professionals, supporting the creative dialogue between composers and performers and offering young professionals the opportunity to develop their skills with ensembles experienced in performing contemporary music on an international level.

== Members ==
Country	Member Organization
Austria	Austrian Composers Association (ÖKB)
Belgium	Belgian Screen Composers Guild (BSCG); De Muziekgilde; Fédération des Auteur·rices, Compositeur·rices et Interprètes Réuni·es (FACIR); Forum de la Création Musicale
Croatia	Hrvatsko drustvo skladatelja (HDS)
Denmark	AUTOR; Danske Populærautorer (DPA); Danks Komponistforening; Brancheklubben for film – og mediekomponister (BFM)
Estonia	Estonian Composers' Union (ECU)
Finland	Suomen Musiikintekijät ry (FMC); Suomen Säveltäjät ry (SFC)
France	Syndicat National des Auteurs et des Compositeurs (SNAC); Union des Compositrices et des Compositeurs (U2C); Union Nationale des Auteurs et des Compositeurs (UNAC)
Germany	Composers Club (CC); Song e.V. Berufsverband Songwriting; Vereinigung Songwriter im Deutschen Komponistenverband (VERSO); Deutsche Fimkomponisten im Deutschen Komponistenverband (DEFKOM); FachGruppe E-Musik im Deutschen Komponistenverband (FEM)
Hungary	Hungarian Composer Union (HCU); Association of Hungarian Composers and Text Writers (AHC)
Iceland	Félag Tónskálda og Textahöfunda (FTT);Tónskáldafélag Íslands (SIC)
Ireland	Screen Composers Guild of Ireland (SCGI)
Italy	Associazione Italiana Musica Per Film (ACMF)
Luxembourg	Fédération Luxembourgeoise des Auteurs et Compositeurs (FLAC)
Macedonia	Composer's Association of Macedonia (SOKOM)
The Netherlands	Genootschap van Nederlandse componisten (Nieuw Geneco); Beroepsvereniging Componisten MultiMedia (BCMM);Verening Componisten en Tekstdichers Ntb (VCTN); BAM! Popauteurs
Norway	Forening for norske komponister og tekstforfattere (NOPA); Norwegian Society of Composers (NSC)
Poland	SPACe Society of Polish Audiovisual Composers; Zwiazek Polskich Autorow i Kompozytorow (ZAKR); Polish Composers' Union (ZKP)
Portugal	Associação Portuguesa de Compositores (APC)
Romania	The Union of Composers and Musicologists of Romania (UCMR)
Serbia	Udruzenje kompozitora Srbije (CAS)
Slovakia	Zväz autorov a interpretov populárnej hudby (ZAI)
Slovenia	Drustvo Slovenskih Skladateljev (DSS)
Spain	Musimagen; Autores de Musica Asociados (AMA); Asociación Madrileña de Compositores (AMCC); Federacion de Asociaciones Ibericas de Compositores (FAIC); Federación de Músicos Asociados (FEMA)
Sweden	Svenska Kompositörer Av Populärmusik (SKAP); Föreningen Svenska Tonsättares (FST)
Switzerland	Sonart
Associated Members
Austria	Österreichische Gesellschaft für zeitgenössische Musik (ÖGZM)
Belgium	Componisten Archipel Vlaanderen (ComaV)
France	Syndicat français des compositrices et compositeurs de musique contemporaine (SMC)
Israel	Israel Composers' League (ICL)
Italy	Fondazione Archivio Lorenzo Ferrero (FALF); Unione Nazionale Compositori Librettisti Autori (UNCLA)
Lithuania	Lithuanian Composers' Union (LCU)
Norway	Sami Composers
The United Kingdom	The Society for Producers and Composers of Applied Music (PCAM)

== Collaboration with other organizations ==
ECSA collaborates both within Europe and overseas with the Human Rights Council of the United Nations, the Society of Composers and Lyricists (SLC), the Songwriters Association of Canada, and the International Music Council.

== See also ==
- Camille Awards
