= John Francis Barnett =

English music composer and teacher

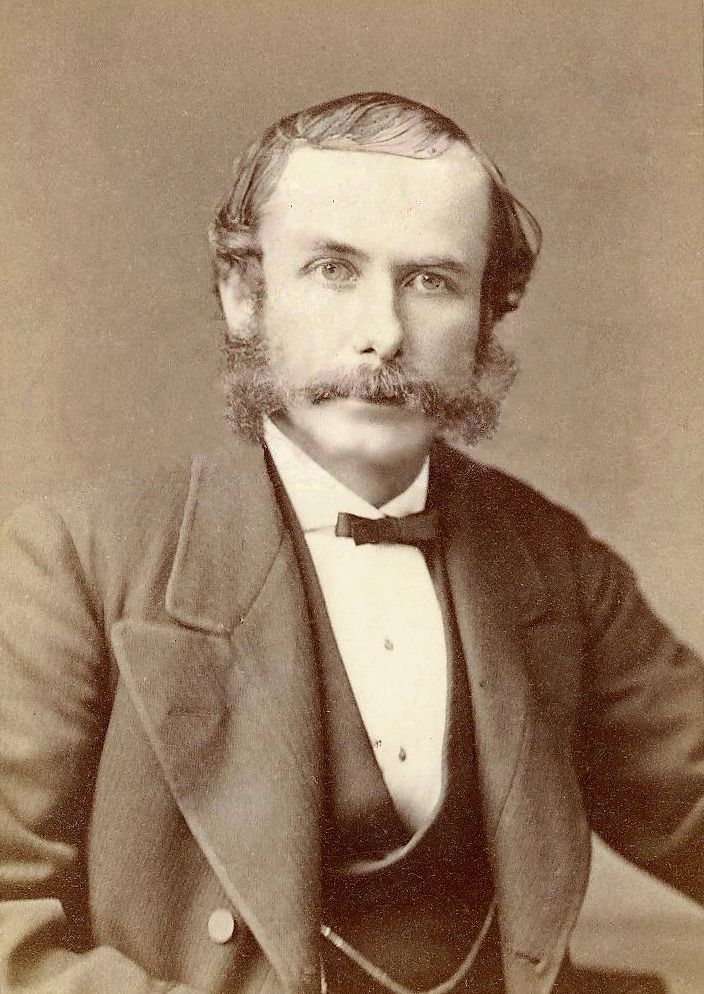
- John Francis Barnett (1837-1916)
- Born: John Francis Barnett; October 16, 1837; St John's Wood, London, England
- Died: November 24, 1916 (aged 79); London, England
- Occupations: Composer, pianist, teacher
- Years active: 1853–1913
- Notable work: Symphony in A minor, The Ancient Mariner, The Raising of Lazarus, The Eve of St Agnes
- Relatives: John Barnett (uncle)

John Francis Barnett (16 October 1837 – 24 November 1916) was an English composer, pianist and teacher.

== Life ==
John Francis Barnett was born on 16 October 1837 at St John's Wood, London. His father was Joseph Alfred Barnett (1810-1898), a professor of music, and his uncle was the composer John Barnett. John Francis carried on the traditions of the family as a composer and teacher. He obtained a Queen's Scholarship at the Royal Academy of Music, London, in 1849 studying under William Sterndale Bennett and developing into an accomplished pianist. In 1857 he travelled to Leipzig to study composition and piano, playing Mendelssohn's Piano Concerto No. 2 in D minor at a Gewandhaus concert on 22 March 1860. His teachers at the Conservatoire in Leipzig were the great pianist Ignaz Moscheles (who had been a pupil of Beethoven), Moritz Hauptmann, Julius Rietz and Louis Plaidy. Whilst at Leipzig, Barnett formed a close friendship with his fellow-student Arthur Sullivan.

Returning to London in 1860, Barnett enjoyed a successful career as a pianist for some years but concentrated increasingly on composition and teaching. He played Beethoven's Emperor Concerto at a New Philharmonic Society concert in London on 16 April 1860, also playing the same composer's Piano Concerto No.3 at a Philharmonic Society concert in London on 10 June 1861.

Barnett became noticed as a composer with his Symphony in A minor (1864), and followed this with a number of large-scale works: his cantatas The Ancient Mariner and Paradise and the Peri were first performed at the 1867 and 1870 Birmingham Festivals respectively, whilst his oratorio The Raising of Lazarus was first performed at a New Philharmonic Society concert in 1873, being repeated at the 1876 Three Choirs Festival held that year in Hereford. During this period, Barnett also composed several other orchestral and instrumental works. Although major commissions became fewer, he secured a first performance of his cantata The Building of the Ship at the 1880 Leeds Festival and his last major composition, the cantata The Eve of St Agnes, was given at a concert of the London Choral Society in 1913. During his lifetime, Barnett's most popular work was The Ancient Mariner which received nine performances during the 1886–87 season and was still being heard (once) during the 1926–27 season.

In 1947, Percy Scholes surveyed a century of The Musical Times (1844-1944) and took the view that "Barnett decidedly hit the taste of the day, and, as will be remembered, that taste was very generally for the Mendelssohnian style and idiom."

The British musicologist Nicholas Temperley judged :

"Barnett's music ultimately died because of its self-effacing politeness. Although he managed to update his style in some of his later cantatas [...] his best work was The Ancient Mariner (Birmingham Festivan 1867). At a time when literary considerations were beginning to weigh more heavily on composers' minds, Barnett remained curiously insensitive to the problems of word-setting."

John Caldwell largely concurred with this assessment:

"Sullivan, Macfarren and J. F. Barnett [...] were the chief composers of choral music in the high Victorian tradition. Their work, particularly that of Sullivan, has plenty of zest and colour, but its idiom is unadventurous and the subject matter (when not biblical) is at best conventionally Romantic, at worst jejune."

In 1883 Barnett was appointed as a Professor at the Royal College of Music where his students included Marmaduke Barton and he also took an active teaching role as a Professor at the Guildhall School of Music, London. His realisation of Schubert's incomplete Symphony No.7 in E, D.729, was first performed at the Crystal Palace, London, on 5 May 1883. George Grove had originally offered the task of completion to Arthur Sullivan but Sullivan turned it down. At the performance of Barnett's completion, Schubert's original autograph sketch, which was owned by Grove (who had obtained it through Mendelssohn's brother Paul, who in turn had obtained it from Schubert's brother Ferdinand), was proudly displayed in the Central Transept of the Crystal Palace. Barnett recalled how, when he had only completed his version of the first movement, Schubert's manuscript sketch was almost lost forever when Grove and W. S. Rockstro left it on a train. A description of Barnett's completion was published in 1891. The score was subsequently published by Breitkopf & Härtel, Leipzig.

John Francis Barnett was twice married, his first wife having died in 1882 giving birth to their fourth child. One of their daughters, Alice May Cook, became a notable artist. Several later members of his family became successful musicians, namely his grandson John Francis Cook (1908-1992), who changed his name by deed poll to John Francis and became well known as a flautist and teacher; and his great-granddaughters Judith Fitton (flautist), Sarah Francis (oboist) and Hannah Francis (soprano).

== Autobiography ==
In 1906 Barnett published Musical Reminiscences and Impressions.

== Works (selective list) ==
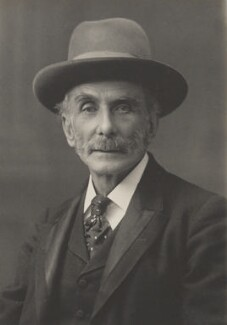
John Francis Barnett (1837-1916)

=== Orchestral ===
- 1864 - Symphony in A minor (Musical Society of London, 15 June 1864)
- 1868 - Overture symphonique in E (Philharmonic Society, London, 11 May 1868; revised version Philharmonic Society, St James's Hall, London, 28 May 1891)
- 1873 - The Winter's Tale, overture (British Orchestral Society, St James's Hall, London, 6 February 1873)
- 1874 - The Lay of the Last Minstrel, suite in four movements (Liverpool Festival, 1 October 1874)
- 1881 - The Harvest Festival, symphonic poem (Norwich Festival, 14 October 1881)
- 1883 - Two sketches: The Ebbing Tide and Elfland, Op.36 (Crystal Palace, London, 15 December 1883)
- 1888 - Pastoral Suite (Philharmonic Society, St James's Hall, London, 31 May 1888) [revised version of The Harvest Festival]
- 1891 - Two sketches: The Flowing Tide and Fairyland (Crystal Palace, London, 25 April 1891)
- 1895 - Two characteristic pieces: Liebeslied and Im alten Styl (Crystal Palace, London, 12 October 1895)

=== Instrumental soloist and orchestra ===
- 1869 - Piano Concerto in D minor, Op.25
- Concerto pastorale for flute and orchestra

=== Choral and vocal ===
- 1865 - Ode to Hope, song, Op.5
- 1867 - The Ancient Mariner, cantata (Birmingham Festival, 29 August 1867)
- 1870 - Paradise and the Peri, cantata (Birmingham Festival, 30 August 1870)
- 1873 - The Raising of Lazarus, oratorio (New Philharmonic Society, London, 18 June 1873)
- 1875 - Midst grove and dell, partsong
- 1876 - The Good Shepherd, sacred cantata, Op.26 (Brighton Festival, 17 February 1876)
- 1880 - The Building of the Ship, cantata, Op.35 (Leeds Festival, 13 October 1880)
- 1880 - The Sea-Fairies for soprano, mezzo-soprano and piano
- 1885 - Come, thou Holy Spirit, anthem
- 1889 - Faithful is our God, anthem
- 1888 - The Triumph of Labour, ode for chorus and orchestra (Crystal Palace, London, 18 August 1888)
- 1893 - The Wishing-Bell, cantata for female voices (Norwich Festival, 9 October 1893)
- 1899 - Christ the Lord is risen today, anthem
- 1903 - If I had but two little wings, madrigal
- 1913 - The Eve of St Agnes, cantata (London Choral Society, Queen's Hall, London, 3 December 1913)
- Missa de angelis (unperformed)

=== Vocal soloist and orchestra ===
- 1880 - The Golden Gate, scena for contralto and orchestra (Philharmonic Society, London, 4 March 1880)

=== Chamber music ===
- 1863 - String Quartet in D minor, Op.8
- 1883 - Flute Sonata in G minor, Op.41
- 1895 - Piano Trio in C minor, Op.49
- Quintet in G minor
- Violin Sonata in E minor

=== Instrumental soloist ===
- 1861 - Caprice brillant for piano, Op.1
- 1861 - Three Sketches for piano, Op.2
- 1862 - Mountain Echoes, characteristic piece for piano
- 1863 - The Return of Spring, concert piece for piano, Op.7
- 1863 - Mount St Bernard (an Alpine scene), characteristic piece for piano
- 1864 - Valses des Saisons for piano
- 1865 - A Pastoral Scene, characteristic piece for piano
- 1866 - L'Espérance, morceau élégant for piano
- 1877 - Gavotte in G minor for piano
- 1878 - Rosalind, romance for piano
- 1879 - The Chapel by the Sea, descriptive piece for piano
- 1880 - Ancient Dances for piano
- 1884 - Piano Sonata in E minor, Op.45
- 1886 - Romance in A flat for piano
- 1886 - Nocturne for piano
- 1888 - Offertoire in G for organ
- 1890 - Danse Antique for piano
- 1891 - Ave Maria, meditation on a prelude of Schumann for organ
- 1892 - Home Scenes, nine pieces for piano
- 1902 - Liebeslied for organ
- 1902 - Fantasia in F for organ
- 1904 - Musical Landscapes, ten pieces for piano
- 1907 - Seven Characteristic Studies for piano
- 1909 - A Dream of Beethoven for piano
- 1910 - The Vesper Bell, descriptive piece for piano
- 1912 - Wayside Sketches for piano
- Sonata Romantique [No.2] in A minor
- Three Impromptus for piano
- Voluntary in E flat for organ

== Scores and manuscripts ==
Many of Barnett's works were published in some form (often moving through different publishers) although a large number of his manuscripts are missing. Novello, Ewer & Co., London, issued a full orchestral score of The Ancient Mariner together with vocal scores of The Ancient Mariner, Paradise and the Peri, The Raising of Lazarus, The Triumph of Labour, The Wishing-Bell and The Eve of St Agnes. Joseph Williams, London, published a full orchestral score and a piano score of Im alten Styl, together with a vocal score of The Good Shepherd. Hutchings & Romer, London, published vocal scores of The Ancient Mariner and The Good Shepherd together with piano scores of movements from The Lay of the Last Minstrel and the Sonata Romantique. Patey & Willis, London, published a vocal score of The Building of the Ship together with Home Scenes and piano scores of The Flowing Tide and The Ebbing Tide. Stanley Lucas, Weber & Co., London, published The Sea-Fairies. Augener & Co., London, published the separate parts of the String Quartet in D minor and the Piano Trio in C minor, together with the Piano Sonata in E minor, Musical Landscapes, Seven Characteristic Studies and Wayside Sketches. Rudall, Carte & Co., London, issued the Flute Sonata in G minor.

Autograph scores of The Building of the Ship, the Missa de angelis, Overture symphonique, The Winter's Tale and two unspecified "orchestral pieces" are held by the Library of the Royal College of Music, London (Add.Mss 4239–4242) together with The Ancient Mariner, Paradise and the Peri, The Raising of Lazarus, The Wishing-Bell and The Eve of St Agnes (Add.Mss 5033a-g).

== Works cited ==
- Scholes, Percy A (1947). The Mirror of Music 1844-1944. London: Novello & Co. and Oxford University Press. pp. 145, 147.
