= Sigismund von Neukomm =

Austrian composer and pianist (1778–1858)

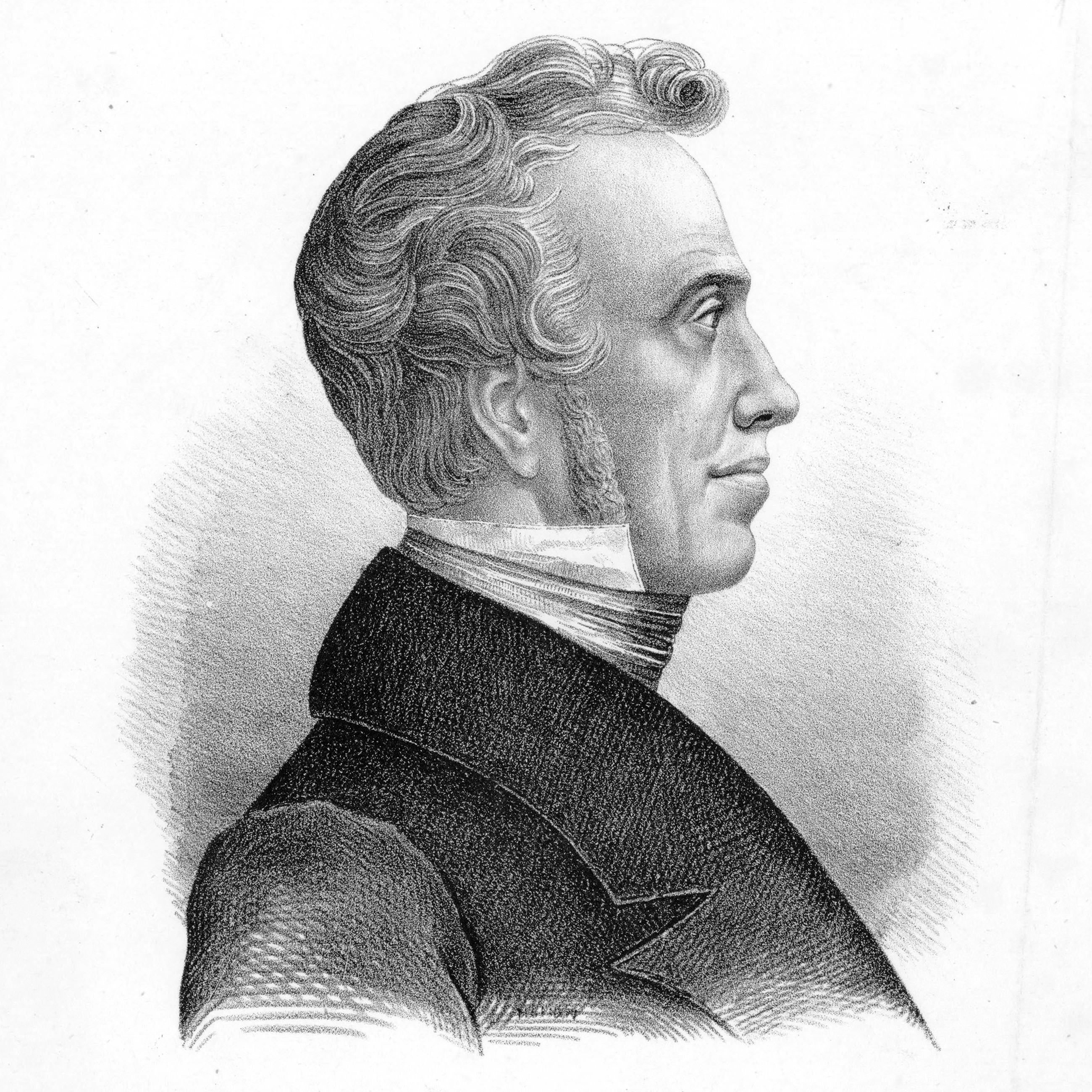
Sigismund von Neukomm

Sigismund Neukomm or Sigismund Ritter von Neukomm [after ennoblement as a knight] (10 July 1778 – 3 April 1858) was an Austrian composer, conductor and pianist. He was a transitional figure between the Classical and Romantic periods of music.

== Education ==
Neukomm was born on 10 July 1778 in Salzburg. He first studied with the Salzburg organist Franz Xaver Weissauer and later studied theory under Michael Haydn and Leopold Mozart, though his studies at Salzburg University (from 1790) were in philosophy and mathematics. He became honorary organist at the Salzburg University Church in 1792, and was appointed chorus-master at the Salzburg court theater in 1796.

== Haydn and Vienna ==
Neukomm left Salzburg at the end of March 1797, moving to Vienna in order to study with Joseph Haydn; his studies lasted seven years. Neukomm venerated his teacher, as is known from the many remarks he made to others and from the many times he dedicated his musical activities to Haydn. He performed a number of services for his teacher, making arrangements of The Creation, Il ritorno di Tobia, The Seasons and the cantata Arianna a Naxos, as well as transcriptions of various symphonies for harmonium and piano. By 1804, when the declining Haydn was no longer able to compose, he took over the task of making arrangements of 43 Scottish folk songs.

In 1814 Neukomm was responsible for erecting a tombstone to the memory of Haydn over his first grave in the Hundsturm cemetery in Vienna. The inscription included a puzzle canon composed by Neukomm himself. He was in regular contact with the composer in the last months of his life, visiting him every day between mid-November 1808 and February 1809.

In Vienna Neukomm also gave piano and singing lessons; his pupils included Anna Milder and Franz Xaver Mozart.

== Travels ==
On 5 May 1804 he left Vienna for Saint Petersburg. Neukomm conducted German opera in the city from 1804 to 1809. Then he moved to Paris, where he became friendly with André Grétry and Cherubini, and succeeded Dussek as pianist for the powerful French foreign minister Talleyrand. In 1816 he travelled to Rio de Janeiro with the Duke of Luxemburg and stayed there as court music director to John VI of Portugal until the revolution forced his return to Lisbon in 1821. He maintained his connection to Talleyrand until 1826 and then embarked on an extended trip to Italy, visiting Genoa, Florence, Rome, Naples, Bologna, Venice and Milan.

== England and France ==
For the last two decades or so of his life Neukomm divided his time between London and Paris. He first came to London in 1829 at the same time as Mendelssohn, and the two met at 3 Chester Place, the home of Ignaz Moscheles. In England his Symphony in E♭ was put on by the Philharmonic Society (on March 21, 1831) and his oratorios gained popularity. Mount Sinai received repeated performances in London, Worcester, Derby and elsewhere, and David was composed especially for the 1834 Birmingham Festival. Two songs - 'Napoleon's Midnight Review' and 'The Sea', both setting words by Barry Cornwall, achieved particular popularity. However, the success of his friend Mendelssohn at the 1837 Birmingham Festival with the oratorio St Paul quickly eclipsed his fame. Despite this Neukomm felt at home in England and claimed to have set more English words than any other foreign composer.

== Final years ==
Neukomm continued to travel widely until the end of his life, while maintaining his homes in England and France. In 1838 he returned to Salzburg for the first time in three decades. He was also there for the unveiling of the Mozart Monument in September 1842, for which he delivered the panegyric, composed a hymn (Österreich), and conducted Mozart's Coronation Mass (k317) and Requiem.

He died in Paris on 3 April 1858 and was buried in the Montmartre cemetery. His autobiography was published in 1859. Neukomm's sister Elisabeth (1789–1816) was a soprano, renowned in Vienna. One of his nephews, Edmond Neukomm (1840–1903), was a French writer on music.

== Music ==
Neukomm's compositional output is large. There are around 1000 church works, including 48 masses and eight oratorios, including his greatest success David. His C minor Requiem Mass à la mémoire de Louis XVI was commissioned by Talleyrand and premiered for royalty and diplomats attending the Congress of Vienna on 21 January 1815, the 22nd anniversary of the execution of Louis XVI. His orchestral works include two symphonies, five overtures, six fantasias for orchestra and a Piano Concerto. There is also an opera, Alexander, incidental music for four plays, a clarinet quintet, and many smaller works such as organ voluntaries, vocal pieces, works for piano solo, and about 200 songs.

His works had some currency in the 19th century: Johann Nepomuk Hummel's op. 123 is a Fantasie for Piano on themes by Hummel and von Neukomm. Boston's Handel and Haydn Society, for example, gave 55 performances of his oratorio David during the 1830s.

== Sources ==
- Vincenzo Cernicchiaro. Storia della musica nel Brasile. Milano, Fratelli Riccioni, 1926.
- Luiz Heitor Corrêa de Azevedo. 'S. Neukomm, An Austrian Composer in the New Word', Musical Quarterly, October 1959
- Rosamund Brunel Gotch (ed.). Mendelssohn and his Friends in Kensington: Letters from Fanny and Sophie Horsley Written 1833-36 (Oxford, 1934)
- Don Randel. The Harvard Biographical Dictionary of Music. Harvard, 1996, p. 633.
