= Thomas Willert Beale =

Thomas Willert Beale (1828 – 3 October 1894) was an English miscellaneous writer, who also wrote under the pseudonym Walter Maynard.

== Life ==
Beale was the only son of Frederick Beale (d. 1863), of the music publishing firm of Cramer, Beale, & Addison of Regent Street. He was admitted student of Lincoln's Inn on 18 April 1860, and was called to the bar in 1863; but music claimed his interests, and, having received lessons from Edward Roeckel and others, he managed operas in London and the provinces, and toured with some of the most notable musicians of his time. As 'Walter Maynard,' he wrote an account of one of these tours, with reminiscences of Mario, Grisi, Guiglini, Lablache, and others, entitled 'The Enterprising Impresario' (London, 1867).

Beale originated the national music meetings at the Crystal Palace with the object of bringing meritorious young musicians to the front, and took a leading part in the institution of the New Philharmonic Society, at which Berlioz conducted some of his compositions by Beale's invitation. It was under his management that Thackeray came out as a lecturer. He wrote a large number of songs and pianoforte pieces, besides Instructions in the Art of Singing (London, 1853), and a series of Music Copy Books (London, 1871).

In February 1877 he produced at the Crystal Palace a farce called The Three Years' System, and a three-act drama, A Shadow on the Hearth; an operetta, An Easter Egg, was produced at Terry's Theatre in December 1893. His autobiography, The Light of other Days as seen through the wrong end of an Opera Glass, was published in 2 vols., London, 1890. He died at Gipsy Hill on 3 Oct. 1894, and was buried at Norwood Cemetery. Late in life he married the widow of John Robinson of Hong Kong; she was a good singer and musician.
