= Henry Gadsby =

English composer, music educator and church organist

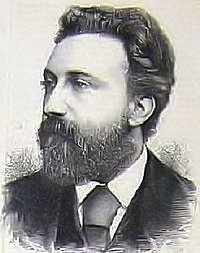
Henry Robert Gadsby (1842-1907)

Henry Robert Gadsby (15 December 1842 – 11 November 1907) was an English composer, music educator and church organist.

== Life ==
Born in Hackney, London, on 15 December 1842, he was son of William Gadsby. From 1849 to 1858 he was a chorister boy at St Paul's Cathedral at the same time as Sir John Stainer. He learnt basic harmony under the vicar-choral William Bayley (1810-1858) but was otherwise self-taught. In 1863 he became a teacher of the piano. His students included Frederick Corder, one of his first pupils, and Hope Squire. Having also taught himself the organ, he became organist of St Ann Church, Blackfriars; Camden Church, Camberwell; and St Peter's Church, Brockley, holding this last appointment till 1884.

Gadsby succeeded John Hullah as Professor of Harmony at Queen's College, London, in 1884, and Sir William Cusins as Professor of Pianoforte and Director of Musical Studies there in 1893. In 1880 he was appointed as the first Professor of Harmony at the Guildhall School of Music, where he taught for the rest of his life. A member of the Philharmonic Society, and other musical societies, and a Fellow of the Royal College of Organists, he was a well-known figure in the musical world. Gadsby was one of a number of eminent musicians who sang in the choir for the open-air service at St Paul’s Cathedral, London, for Queen Victoria’s diamond jubilee in 1897. He died on 11 November 1907 at 53 Clarendon Road, Putney, London, and was buried in Putney Vale cemetery. His widow died shortly after him, leaving two daughters.

A photograph of Gadsby is held by the National Portrait Gallery, London, as part of a composite bromide print: "Various musical celebrities". Gadsby is number 685.

== Reception ==
Several of Gadsby's works were heard at the Crystal Palace, London. Reviewing his overture Andromeda in 1873 The Musical Times offered the opinion that:

"although this composer is by no means a stranger to the audience here, there can be little doubt that this is the ripest work he has yet given us. The subjects are melodious, the instrumentation is skilful and in keeping with the nature of the theme he has chosen, and the general effect of the work in every respect fully merited the warm applause with which it was greeted."

In 1874, the first performance of Gadsby's overture The Witch's Frolic under the auspices of the British Orchestral Society was reviewed favourably by the same journal:

"Mr. Gadsby's Overture is fully worthy of a more intimate acquaintance, for it is evidently the composition of an artist who thinks and writes in the true school. The themes are clear and well defined, and the instrumentation appropriate throughout. Mr. Gadsby is steadily winning his way to a high position amongst English composers, and we are glad to find that this Society is holding out the hand of welcome to our most talented native writers."

The Musical Times, reviewing the 1879 Brighton Festival, noted of Gadsby's cantata The Lord of the Isles that

"Mr. Gadsby, I hardly need say, has long occupied the position of a rising man. In music for the church, as well as for the concert-room, he has won success. Several numbers were encored, and at the close Mr. Gadsby was twice recalled amid general applause. There can be no doubt that the Cantata was a frank success with its first audience."

In March 1886 Gadsby secured a prestigious first performance of his orchestral scene The Forest of Arden under the auspices of the Philharmonic Society, London. The Musical Times thought that

"As the composer tells us he merely desired to "determine the mood" in which the audience should listen to his work, we may at once say that, judged according to his own direction, he may credit himself with a very fair amount of success. We have very little hesitation in awarding a higher amount of praise to the first than to the second movement; but this may be partially traceable to the fact of the conventional nature of "hunting music", which even in its commonest form can scarcely be mistaken. "The Autumn Morning" is graceful and refined throughout, delicately scored, and treated with musicianlike feeling, the second theme, especially, arresting the attention by its tunefulness and sympathy with the subject of the work, and a well written Coda bringing the movement to a highly effective termination. Warm and well deserved applause was awarded to the composer, who conducted, at the conclusion of the work, which in all respects received an excellent rendering."

His final large-scale orchestral work, the Festal Symphony of 1888, was also his last Crystal Palace premiere. A review of the concert in The Musical Times allowed that:

"The work is of a varied and elaborate character, the last movement in particular being noticeable for a lavish display of orchestral devices. The opening movement is, on a first hearing, the most impressive. But, as we have said at the onset, there is much excellent workmanship and constructive ingenuity displayed in the new work, which met with a very warm feeling from the audience."

According to his obituary, published in The Musical Times,

"Mr. Gadsby, whose interests included sketching and water-colour painting, was a much-esteemed musician, and his loss will be deeply deplored by a large circle of friends and pupils."

Frederick Corder characterised Gadsby as:

"a typical Victorian composer, whose works were always well received and never heard a second time."

Herbert Howells was deprecating of Gadsby's work, saying that Stanford was revolutionary because he:

"swept aside the pretentious, empty gaudiness of the Victorian organist-composer of the Gadsby-in-C type".

== Works ==
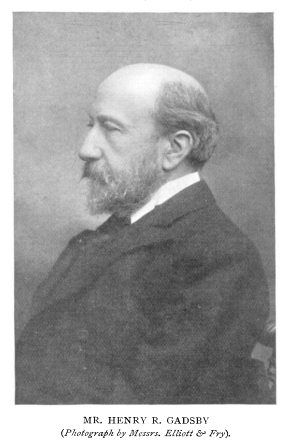
Henry Robert Gadsby (1842-1907)

=== Opera ===
- 1862 - Christine, operetta (New Royalty Theatre, London, 21 March 1862)

=== Incidental music ===
- 1876 - Alcestis, incidental music (Crystal Palace, 12 December 1876)
- 1893 - Andromache, incidental music (Queen's College, London)
- 1897 - Aminta, incidental music (for the Jubilee of Queen's College, London, 5 July 1897)

=== Orchestral ===
- 1865 - Symphony No.1 in C (Musical Society of London, Hanover Square Rooms, London, 15 February 1865)
- 1867 - Symphony No.2 in A (Larghetto and Scherzo only performed, Crystal Palace, London, 11 February 1871, revised 1873)
- 1869 - The Golden Legend, overture to a cantata (Crystal Palace, London, 18 December 1869)
- 1872 - Andromeda, overture (Crystal Palace, London, 22 February 1873)
- 1873 - Harold, festal march
- 1874 - The Witch's Frolic, overture (British Orchestral Society, St James's Hall, London, March 1874; revised version Crystal Palace, London, 17 October 1874)
- 1875 - Intermezzo and Scherzo (British Orchestral Society, St James's Hall, London, 21 April 1875)
- 1886 - Orchestral Scene, The Forest of Arden: Intermezzo, An Autumn Morning and Tantarra, The Hunt is Up (Philharmonic Society, St James's Hall, London, 4 March 1886)
- 1888 - Festal Symphony [Symphony No.3] in D (Crystal Palace, London, 3 November 1888)
- 1902 - King and Empire, triumphal march

=== Instrumental soloist and orchestra ===
- 1873 - Organ Concerto in F (Crystal Palace, London, 24 January 1874)
- 1875 - Violin Concerto in F (Crystal Palace, London, 11 December 1875)

=== Choral and vocal ===
- 1859 - Three Choral Songs
- 1861 - We arm, we arm! no nation to defy, choral march
- 1862 - O Israel trust in the Lord, anthem
- 1862 - Deus misereatur in F
- 1864 - Psalm 130 (Henry Leslie's Choir, 5 May 1864)
- 1869 - The Golden Legend, cantata
- 1870 - Alice Brand, cantata
- 1871 - Festival Service in D for Eight Voices
- 1871 - Cantate Domino
- 1871 - Deus misereatur in D
- 1871 - O Lord, our Governour, anthem
- 1871 - Sing, O Daughter of Zion, anthem
- 1872 - He is risen!, anthem
- 1873 - Summer Winds, partsong
- 1873 - The Sea is Calm, partsong
- 1873 - The Soldier's Song, partsong
- 1874 - Magnificat and Nunc dimittis in C for chorus and orchestra
- 1874 - The Lord is King (Psalm 93), anthem
- 1874 - Ponder My Words, O Lord, anthem
- 1874 - Rejoice greatly, anthem
- 1876 - Te Deum, Benedictus and Kyrie in C
- 1876 - A Song of Welcome to the Prince of Wales on his return from India
- 1876 - I will lay me down in peace, anthem
- 1876 - Not unto us, O Lord, anthem
- 1877 - Morning and Evening Service in C
- 1878 - Te Deum in E flat
- 1878 - Blessed Be the Name of the Lord, anthem
- 1879 - The Lord of the Isles, cantata (Brighton Festival, 13 February 1879)
- 1879 - Magnificat and Nunc dimittis in D
- 1879 - The Girl I Left Behind Me, old English song
- 1880 - Columbus, cantata for male voices and orchestra (Crystal Palace, London, 19 March 1881)
- 1880 - Te Deum in G
- 1890 - The Cyclops, cantata for male voices and orchestra (Queen's College, Oxford, 30 May 1890)
- 1890 - Lo, the Winter is Past, anthem
- 1892 - Magnificat and Nunc dimittis in F
- 1892 - Benedicite, omnia opera in G
- 1894 - Among the Gods, anthem
- 1898 - Ode written by C. E. Maurice for the Jubilee of Queen's College, London, May, 1898 (The College Hymn) for female chorus
- 1899 - Except the Lord build the house, anthem
- 1905 - I will go unto the Altar of God, anthem
- 1905 - Benedictus and Agnus dei

=== Chamber music ===
- 1875 - String Quartet in C
- 1875 - Andante and rondo (Rondo piacevole) for flute and piano

=== Instrumental soloist ===
- 1886 - Ten Original Pieces for organ

=== Text-books on musical theory ===
- 1883 - Harmony. A Treatise, including the Chords of the Eleventh and Thirteenth, and Harmonisation of Given Melodies (published by Novello, Ewer & Co., London, 1884)
- 1897 - A Technical Method of Sight-singing (published by Boosey & Co., London, 1897)

== Scores and manuscripts ==
The only work by Gadsby to be published in full orchestral score was The Forest of Arden issued by Novello, Ewer & Co., London, however several other significant works were also printed: Novello, Ewer & Co., London, issued vocal scores of The Lord of the Isles, Columbus, Alcestis and the Ode written by C. E. Maurice; Augener & Co., London, issued a vocal score of The Cyclops; Joseph Williams, London, issued a vocal score of Aminta; Stanley Lucas, Weber & Co., London, published the score and parts of the String Quartet; other London publishers (unspecified or unidentified by either the British Library, London, or the Bodleian Library, Oxford) issued vocal scores of Alice Brand and A Song of Welcome together with a piano duet arrangement of Andromeda and Ten Original Pieces for organ.

Autograph full orchestral scores of Symphony No.2, Andromeda, Harold and the Festal Symphony and piano duet arrangements of Andromeda and The Forest of Arden, are at the British Library, London (Music manuscripts 1198-1202: 1862-88), having been purchased at Bonhams on 29 June 2004 (lot 500) for £478, together with lithographed orchestral parts for King and Empire (Music Collections h.3210.h.(11.)). Autograph (possibly full orchestral) scores of the Magnificat and Nunc dimittis in C, The Lord of the Isles, Columbus, the Magnificat and Nunc dimittis in F and Alcestis are at the Royal College of Music, London (Add.Mss 5083a-e).
