= Simon Mawhinney =

Northern Irish composer, Professor of Composition

- Born: 1976 (age 49–50); County Down, Northern Ireland
- Occupation: Composer
- Years active: 1999–present

Simon Mawhinney (born 1976) is a Northern Irish composer. His music has been performed in the UK, Ireland, Germany, France, and Iceland, and has won prizes including the Royal Philharmonic Society Composition Prize.

== Early life and education ==
Mawhinney was born in County Armagh, Northern Ireland in 1976. As a student, he studied music at the University of Oxford, the University of York and Queen's University Belfast, the latter of which he has held the position of senior lecturer in composition since 2006 and Professor of Composition since 2022.

== Musical career ==
Throughout his musical career, Mawhinney has used a range of compositional techniques, drawing on the post-spectral and New Complexity movements. He has also been interested in computer-assisted composition, specifically using OpenMusic, a software developed by the French company IRCAM.

Mawhinney draws particular inspiration from the music of Olivier Messiaen and Pierre Boulez, stating that Boulez's Dérive 2 is a pinnacle of contemporary music. He has also been influenced by the works of Kaikhosru Sorabji. He has a particular interest in music with extended duration, with inspiration from composers such as Morton Feldman. In 2009, he said about his composition Hunshigo that he felt all of his compositional work was, in some way, a response to The Troubles in Northern Ireland. He said:

However, no specific work sets out to make explicit reference. Rather, I have sought in my work to consider underlying sources of conflict (which I would term duality in order to apply it universally) and to come up with solutions as to how it is prevented. I have sought to inculcate my optimistic/idealistic world view throughout the structure of my work. Hunshigo [for violin and piano] is as good an example as any of mine in which the resulting musical language reflects my response. I really cannot envisage writing any other way to achieve this.

== Selected works ==
Mawhinney's works include:

- Hunshigo (2009) – for violin and piano
- Nendrum Haykal (2006) – for viola d'amore
- Starbog (2006) – for chamber ensemble
- Batu (2005) – for piano
- Trumpet Sketches (2004) – for trumpet
- Darby's Loanin (2003) – for chamber ensemble
- Asháb (2003) – for symphony orchestra
- Barcode 3 (2003) – for violin
- Barcode (2003) – for trumpet
- Barcode 2 (2002) – for flute and clarinet
- The Pot of Pulgarve (2003) – for symphony orchestra
- Qalban Tahiran (2001) – for voice and chamber ensemble
- Lavander (2000) – for clarinet and large ensemble
- Namas (1999) – for large ensemble
