= Alfons Karabuda =

Swedish composer and cultural politics personality

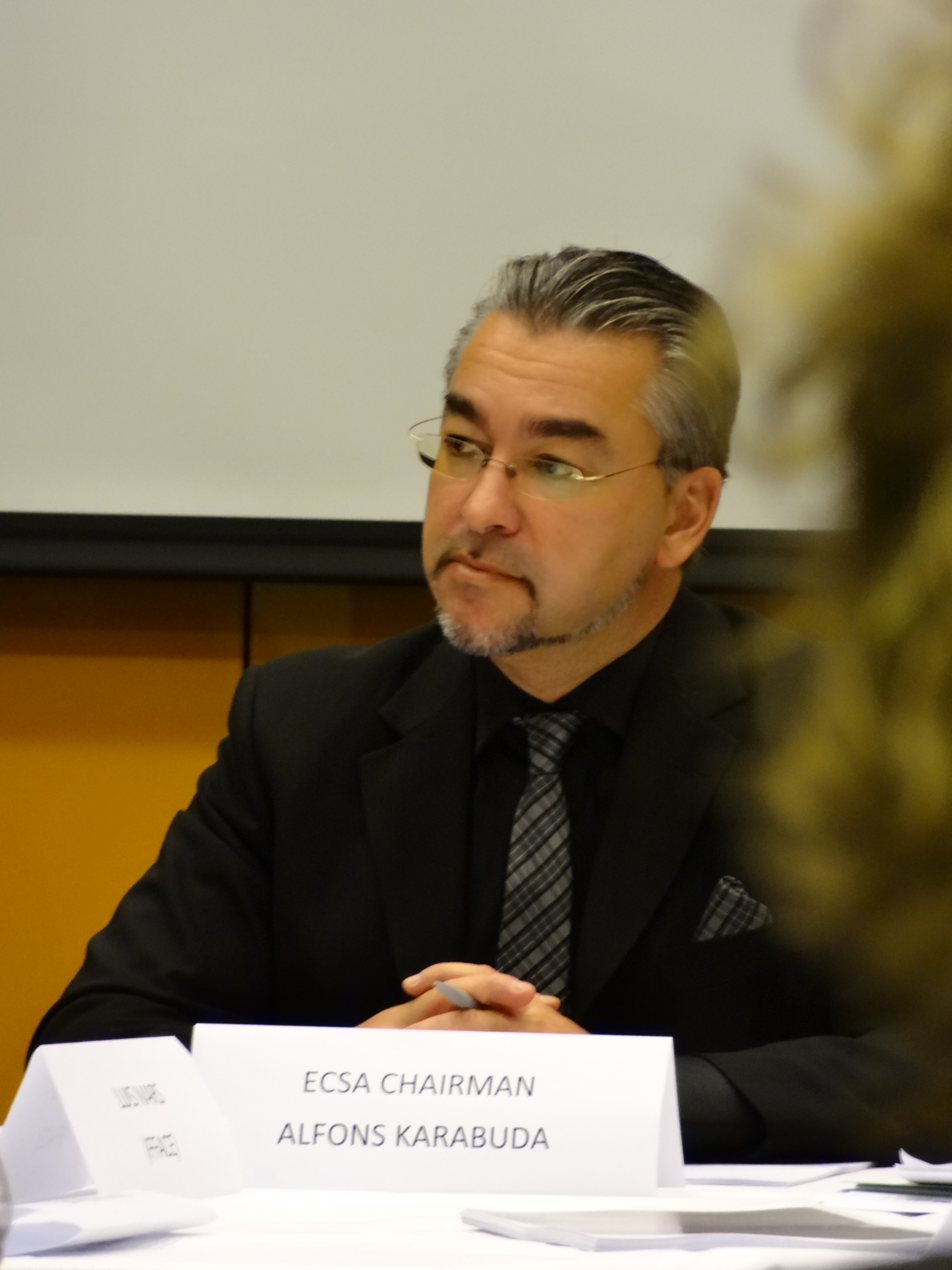
- Alfons Karabuda at the ECSA General Assembly in Reykjavik 2012
- Born: December 2, 1967 (age 58); Stockholm, Sweden
- Occupation: composer
- Relatives: Denize Karabuda

Alfons Karabuda, born 2 December 1967 in Stockholm, Sweden, is a Swedish composer and EU cultural politics personality.

Karabuda has been president of ECSA (European Composer and Songwriter Alliance), executive chairman of SKAP (the Swedish Association of Composers, Songwriters & Lyricists) and expert in the field of artistic rights to the UN Human Rights Council. He has also been the president of the UNESCO founded IMC (International Music Council), member of the board of The Royal College of Music in Stockholm, Musiksverige (Music Sweden) and STIM (The Swedish Performing Rights Society) and Svensk Musik (Swedish Music). Karabuda is also chair of the Polar Music Prize Award.

As expert to the UN Human Rights Council, Karabuda was part of producing the first ever UNHRC report on artistic rights in 2013. The report was followed by new reports during 2014.

As the president of ECSA, Karabuda was a driving force in getting the EU to decide on the new Copyright Directive in 2019 and the formation of a European–American collaboration between the music creator organisations ECSA and SGA (Songwriters Guild of America). The organisations have focused on the global issues of artistic rights, free speech and authors' rights (in America, copyright), in joint actions such as the Fair Trade Music Initiative and 2019 making promoting a legal entity with authors in governance to administer online mechanical rights in the US.

As a member of the executive board of STIM, and during 2014 as acting CEO, Karabuda focused on developing international strategy, improving distribution systems and adjusting the organization to the new EU directive on collective rights management.

Karabuda's parents, Günes and Barbro Karabuda, were journalists and filmmakers. His sister Denize Karabuda is an actor and director. The Karabuda children grew up traveling during their parents' many assignments, to which Karabuda himself credits his cultural political involvement.

Karabuda works in the areas of TV, film and theatre through his publishing company Naomi Musikförlag & Filmproduktion. Among his customers are SVT, SR, BBC, Zentropa and Stockholm City Theatre.

== Human rights ==
Karabuda was the president of ECSA, joint to Biggest International campaign Freemuse for Iranian musician Mehdi Rajabian and filmmaker Hossein Rajabian, he was signed by the following of the ARJ group.

== "Spring party" bribery charges ==
Since the thirties Skap and affiliated musical organisations has invited members and Stockholm cultural workers and stakeholders to what has been commonly known as "spring parties", where prizes were awarded, live music performed and food and drinks served. In 2014, Sveriges Radio broadcast a program about a series of Christmas and spring parties organised by Skap and FST, and made a case that the parties were designed to influence decision makers within Swedish cultural politics and institutions. Alfons Karabuda and six other Swedish cultural personalities was thus accused of bribing the public officials who chose to attend the parties and was cleared of all charges by a unanimous Tingsrätt, which moved the case to Svea Hovrätt where a divided court in October 2018 convicted Karabuda and FST executive chairman Martin Q Larsson. The case was consequently appealed to the Högsta Domstolen (Supreme Court of Sweden) where a formal appeal was granted on the 22 of May 2019 and on the 17 of March 2020 the Supreme Court answered and the stated fact that the events are not to be considered undue benefits. The Supreme Court ruled that no crime was committed and that the prosecuted individuals and organisations are completely exonerated and that all legal costs are to be paid by the government.

== Selected projects ==
Television

- Bookmark Childhood – BBC
- LinSilk Road/Turqoise – NOS TV3
- The World Heritage Expedition – NOS TV3
- Desert’s Blue Eye, Aral – Academy Production
- AuDeLá de l'Lointaine – E.G.E TV

Film

- Fruen på Hamre – Zentropa
- Violbukten – SFI/Filmteknik/Oberon & Son
- Skyernes Skygge Rammer Mig – Zentropa
- Helten Henning – Arena Film

Theatre

- Stora landsvägen – Stockholm City Theatre
- Toten Insel – Stockholm City Theatre
- Dickie Harding – Sveriges Radio
- Förhör 63-11 – Sveriges Radio
- Häxorna – Sveriges Radio
