= British Orchestral Society =

The British Orchestral Society was established in 1872 for the purpose of giving an annual series of concerts by British artists. The Society ceased to exist in 1875, its last concert taking place on 1 June of that year.

The concerts were given at St James's Hall. The soloists, vocal and instrumental, together with the band of 75 performers, were drawn from the ranks of native musicians. The scheme of each concert included a symphony, a concerto, two overtures, and vocal music, the programme being gone through without a break. George Mount was the conductor, and the orchestra was led by John Tiplady Carrodus.

The music was drawn from composers of all nations, but several new works by native writers were given for the first time, including George Alexander Macfarren's overture to St John the Baptist (1873); John Francis Barnett's overture to Shakespeare's The Winter's Tale (1873), written for the Society; Hamilton Clarke's Saltarello (1874); Alfred Holmes's overture to Inez de Castro (1874); Henry Gadsby's overture The Witches' Frolic (1874); and Thomas Wingham's Symphony in B flat (1875).
