= Alice May Cook =

British artist (1876-1960)

Alice May Cook née Barnett (1876–1960) was a British artist, notable as a miniature painter and book illustrator.

== Biography ==
Cook was born in the Paddington area of London to Alice and John Francis Barnett, a pianist and member of the Royal Academy of Music. Aged 14, Cook enrolled in the St John's Wood School of Art and went on to study at the Royal Academy Schools. Cook painted miniature portraits, often in watercolours, and created illustrations for children's books. She created over seventy-five illustrations, including fifteen colour plates for the 1915 book "Peggy's Travels". From 1907 to 1960 Cook exhibited a total of 51 works at the Royal Academy in London and also exhibited with the Royal Scottish Academy, the Society of Women Artists and also in Canada and South Africa.

Cook was an elected member of the Royal Miniature Society. She married a clerk, Walter Frank Cook, in 1899 and together they had seven children. Cook spent most of her life in London but also lived in Edinburgh and at Spixworth in Norfolk for periods and died at Colchester in Essex during 1960. Her husband, Walter Frank Cook, became a civil servant, but also worked as an artist himself. He was listed as a figure and portrait painter and exhibited ten works at the Royal Academy over three different years. His wife exhibited 38 works at the Royal Academy over the years, and also exhibited much work at other galleries in the UK. Alice illustrated two children's books written by a Walter Cook, and presumably this was her husband. The books were "Busy Little People all the World Over" (1911), and "Peggy's Travels" (1908), both published by Blackie.
