= International Music Day =

World day

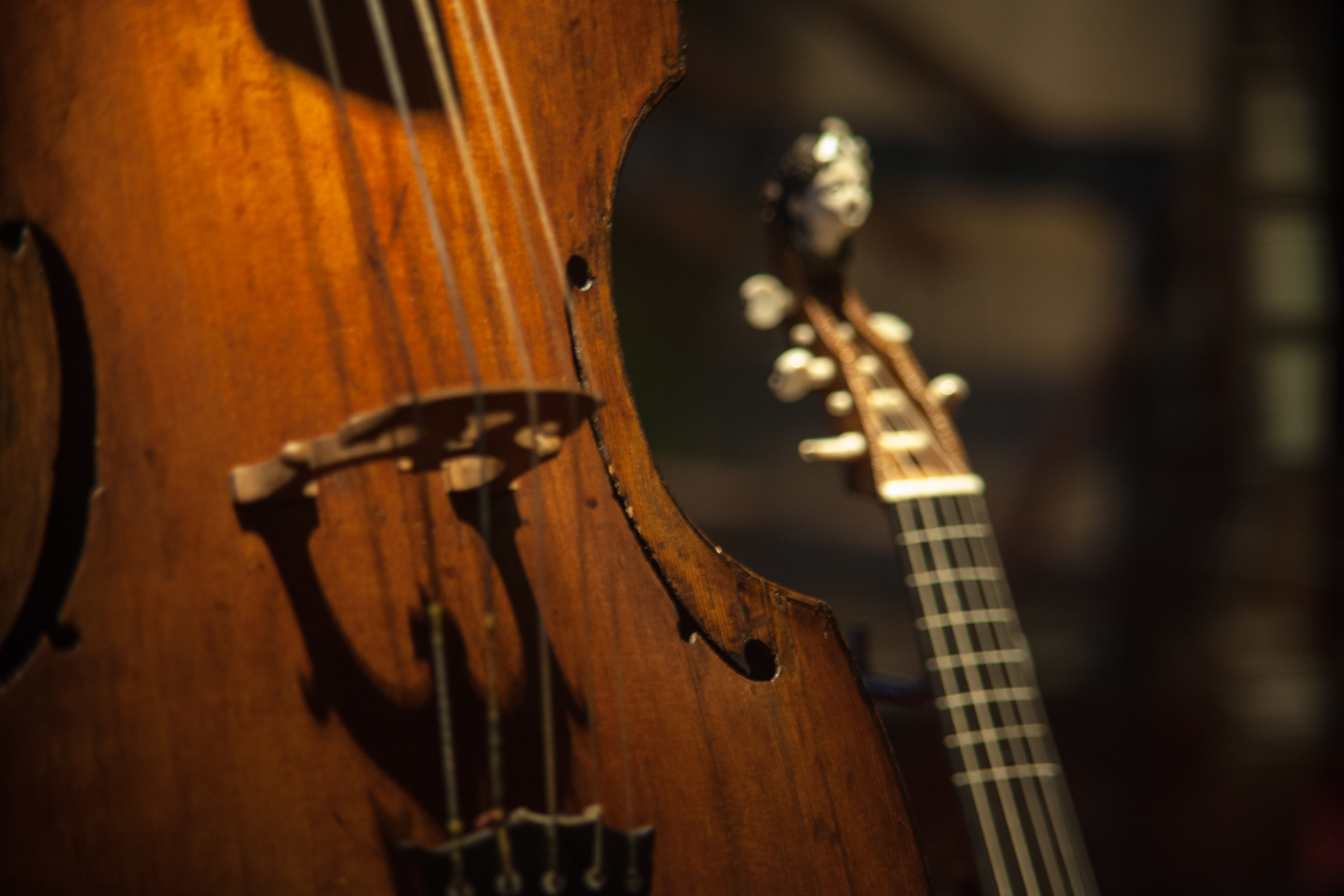
- Viol, 1694, by Joachim Tileke; viol (pardessus viola), 1745, by Pierre Larcher.
- Genre: World music
- Dates: October 1
- Years active: 1975–present
- Founders: Yehudi Menuhin, International Music Council

International Music Day is observed on October 1, a date established by International Music Council in 1975 to celebrate the diverse expressions and global significance of music. This day pays tribute to musicians and the various musical styles that people of all backgrounds enjoy and share, bringing them together through a shared sentiment.

== History ==
International Music Day was officially designated on October 1, 1975, with the goal of uniting people from all walks of life through their diverse artistic expressions, particularly music, which symbolizes equality as it resonates with everyone.

May International Music Day be a prelude to world mutual aid-day. A day when each one will try to help, to understand and to sympathize with our adversary or our opponent, a day when we shall endeavour to turn enemies into friends and when brotherly hate will give way to brotherly love.

— Yehudi Menuhin

The specific date of celebration may vary from one country to another, but the underlying purpose remains consistent. While some European countries and others mark it on November 22 (Saint Cecilia's Day), in France it's celebrated on June 21st, and in Uruguay, it falls on October 1st.

This concept was initiated by Lord Yehudi Menuhin to promote music across all segments of society and uphold UNESCO's ideals of peace and friendship among nations. Its objectives include fostering the exchange of experiences and mutual appreciation of aesthetic values, as well as advancing the activities of the International Music Council, its international member organizations, national committees, and its overall program policy.

Since 1975, millions of people around the world have celebrated International Music Day each year.
