= Jonathan Lloyd (composer) =

British composer (1948–2025)

Jonathan Lloyd (30 September 1948 – 31 July 2025) was a British composer.

== Life and career ==
Lloyd's early teachers included Emile Spira. He continued his studies at the Royal College of Music where he was a recipient of the Mendelssohn Scholarship. His orchestral work Cantique, which he wrote whilst at the RCM, was featured in the 30-year retrospective of the Society for the Promotion of New Music (SPNM) in 1973. He continued to study composition with John Lambert and Edwin Roxburgh as well as Henri Pousseur in Durham. In 1973, Lloyd attended the Tanglewood Music Center in the US, where he studied with György Ligeti and where he won the Koussevitsky Prize for his work Scattered Ruins. In 1978-1979, he was composer-in-residence at the Dartington College of Arts in its theatre department.

Lloyd began to achieve wider recognition with his 1981 work Toward the Whitening Dawn, which he composed in memory of John Lennon. He composed works on commission from such ensembles as the London Sinfonietta, the BBC Symphony Orchestra and the Birmingham Contemporary Music Group. In addition to works for the concert hall, Lloyd composed a new score to accompany the silent version of Alfred Hitchcock's 1929 film Blackmail.In 1986 he collaborated with the music critic Michael White on a large-scale community opera, The Adjudicator, for the village of Blewbury, Oxon.

Lloyd died on 31 July 2025 at the age of 76.

== Selected compositions ==
=== Chamber ensembles ===
- Airs and Graces
- Almeida Dances
- Ballad for the Evening of a Man
- Ben's Boogie
- Brass Quintet
- Dancing in the Ruins
- Don't mention the War
- The Five Senses
- 'Go Blow Your Own'
- 'He will make it'
- 'It's All Sauce to Me'
- John's Journal
- Like Fallen Angels
- The Mill of Memories
- The New Ear
- Oboe Sonata
- One Step More
- Restless Night
- The Shorelines of Certainty
- Songs from the Other Shore ("It's All Sauce to Me"; "The Mill of Memories"; "Like Fallen Angels"; "The Shorelines of Certainty")
- String Quintet No. 1
- String Quintet No. 2
- Then
- There (guitar duo version)
- There and Then
- Three Dances
- Time Between Trains
- True Refuge
- Waiting for Gozo
- Wind Quintet
- 'Won't It Ever Be Morning'

=== Orchestral and concertante works ===
- blessed days of blue (for flute and orchestra)
- Cantique
- Fantasy (for violin and orchestra)
- Feuding Fiddles
- Keir's Kick
- new balls
- old racket
- Rhapsody (for cello and orchestra)
- Symphony No. 1 (1980)
- Symphony No. 2 (1983-4)
- Symphony No. 3 (1987)
- Symphony No. 4 (1988)
- Symphony No. 5 (1989)
- There (for guitar and orchestra)
- Tolerance
- Viola Concerto
- Violin Concerto
- Wa Wa Mozart (for piano and orchestra)

=== Choral and vocal works ===
- And Beyond
- Everything Returns
- If I Could Turn You On
- Marching to a Different Song
- Mass
- Missa Brevis
- 'People your Dreams'
- Revelation
- Three Songs
- Toward the Whitening Dawn

=== Music theatre works ===
- Musices Genus
- Scattered Ruins
- The Adjudicator
