= Luiz Heitor Corrêa de Azevedo =

Brazilian folklorist and musicology scholar

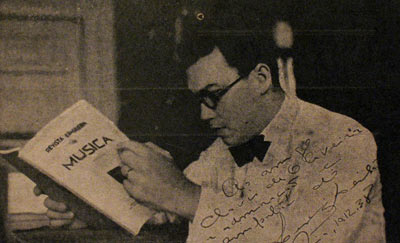
- Luiz Heitor Corrêa de Azevedo, first editor of Revista Brasileira de Musicologia
- Born: December 13, 1905; Rio de Janeiro, Brazil
- Died: November 10, 1992 (aged 86); Paris, France
- Occupations: Folklorist, musicologist, journalist, author

Academic background
- Education: National Institute of Music

Academic work
- Discipline: Musicology
- Sub-discipline: Brazilian music
- Institutions: UNESCO, University of Paris, National School of Music, Brazilian Conservatory of Music

Luiz Heitor Corrêa de Azevedo (13 December 1905 – 10 November 1992) was a Brazilian journalist, musicologist and folklorist.

== Education ==
Luiz Heitor Corrêa de Azevedo studied piano at the National Institute of Music in Rio de Janeiro under Alfredo Bevilacqua and Charley Lachmund, and harmony, counterpoint, and fugue under Paulo Silva. Corrêa initially intended to be a composer but by the late 1920s had decided on musicology and music criticism. He worked as a librarian at the Institute following graduation.

== Career ==
In 1928, Corrêa wrote for the newspaper O Imparcial and, in 1934, founded both Revista Brasileira de Música, for which he was editor until 1942, and Arquivo de Música Brasileira, which supplemented the magazine. The Arquivo's first publishing contained music such as Tantum Ergo by José Maurício Nunes Garcia and Canto Religioso and O Salutaris by Francisco Manuel da Silva. In 1939, he became a faculty member in the national folklore department at Brazil's National School of Music and later taught music history at the Brazilian Music Conservatory. During this time, he began developing the ethnomusicology curriculum and in 1943 founded Centro de Pesquisas Folclóricas, a folklore research center. He also continued writing for magazines such as Revista Cultura Política and directed a classic music radio show called Hora do Brasil.

Between 1941 and 1942, he was Brazil's Division of Music representative at the Pan American Union and served as a music consultant for the Organization of American States. In the late 1940s, he moved to Paris and became a music program specialist for UNESCO. While in Paris, he was dedicated to promoting Brazilian music and took it upon himself to advertise Brazilian concerts and performances to the larger European community. He also published his first music catalogue based on Chopin's music and worked on archival, research, and recording projects for many types of music. He also led the Section for Cooperation with Non-Governmental Organizations from 1953-1965. Between 1953 and 1968, he taught Latin American studies at the University of Paris.

Corrêa's contributions to musicology centered on systemizing and cataloging national music and folklore. He created the first accurate mapping of Brazilian musical culture and made folkloric information accessible to researchers and to potential listeners. In his book 150 anos de música no Brasil, Corrêa wrote about how underdeveloped UNESCO's music department was and that the only official documents were a survey on the conditions of "musical life" in several countries and a half-finished project about international discography. Corrêa also attempted to connect music organizations all over the world. This network would later evolve into the International Music Council.

== Books and articles published ==
- 1933 - Luciano Gallet, Revista da Associação brasileira de música, II/4, 2–20.
- 1935 - José Maurício Nunes Garcia, Boletín latino-americano de música, I, 133–50.
- 1936 - Carlos Gomes e Francisco Manuel: correspondência inédita (1864–1865), Revista brasileira de música, III, 323–38.
- 1936 - Carlos Gomes folclorista, Revista brasileira de música, III, 177–84.
- 1938 - Dois pequenos estudos de folclore musical (Rio de Janeiro).
- 1938 - Escala, ritmo e melodia na música dos índios brasileiros (Rio de Janeiro).
- 1939 - Relação das óperas de autores brasileiros (Rio de Janeiro: Serviço gráfico do Ministério da educação e saúde)
- 1939 - Introdução ao curso de folclore nacional da Escola nacional de música da Universidade do Brasil, Revista brasileira de música, VI, 1–10.
- 1940 - La musique au Brésil, nos.195–6, 74–81.
- 1941 - Tupynambá melodies in Jean de Léry’s “Histoire d’unvoyage fait en la terre du Brésil”, 85–96.
- 1943 - Mário de Andrade e o folclore, Revista brasileira de música, IV, 11–14.
- 1947 - La música en el Brasil, Cuadernos americanos, no.33, 250–73.
- 1948 - A música brasileira e seus fundamentos (8Washington DC, 1948; Eng. trans., 1948 - Divisão de Música e Artes Visuais, Departamento de Assuntos Culturais, União Pan Americana)
- 1950 - Música e músicos do Brasil (Rio de Janeiro: Casa do estudante do Brasil)
- 1952 - with C. Person de Matos and M. de Moura Reis: Bibliografia musical brasileira (1820–1950) (Rio de Janeiro).
- 1956 - La musique en Amérique latine (Rio de Janeiro).
- 1956 - 150 anos de música no Brasil (1800–1950) (Rio de Janeiro: Livraria José Olympio)
- 1962 - Música y cultura en el siglo XVIII, nos.81–2, 135–52.
- 1965 - Vissungos: Negro Work Songs of the Diamond District in Minas Gerais, Brazil, Music in the Americas: Bloomington, IN, 64–7.
- 1966 - Le chant de la liberté: compositeurs de l’Amérique latine à l’époque des luttes pour l’Indépendence, hymnographie patriotique, Mélanges à la mémoire de Jean Sarrailh (Paris), 259–79.
- 1968 - Music and Society in Imperial Brazil, 1822–1889, Portugal and Brazil in Transition, ed. R.S. Sayers (Minneapolis,), 303–9.
- 1969 - La musique à la cour portugaise de Rio de Janeiro, 1808–1821, Arquivos do Centro cultural português, I, 335–52.
- 1971 - Arthur Napoléon 1843–1925: un pianiste portugais au Brésil, Arquivos do Centro cultural português, iii (Paris), 572–602.
- 1972 - The Present State and Potential of Music Research in Latin America, Perspectives in Musicology, ed. B.S. Brook, E.O.D Downes and S. Van Solkema (New York), 249–69.
- 1980 - Preliminary Study on the Project of Preparing a Universal History of Music and the Role of the Music of Latin America and the Caribbean in History, World of Music, XXII/3, 56–62.
- 1983 - José Maurício no panorama da música brasileira, Estudos mauricianos, ed. J.C. A. Muricy (Rio de Janeiro), 35–40.
- 1986 - Etat sommaire de nos connaissances actuelles sur la musique Latino-Américaine et son passé: la contribution européenne, Le Nouveau Monde et l’intelligence de la musique européenne au XVI e siècle, Brussels Museum of Musical Instruments Bulletin, XVI, 1–11, 41–9.
- 1986 - O compositor latino-americano e o universo sonoro deste fim de século, Latin American Music Review, VII/2, 248–53.
- 1987 - As primeiras óperas: “A Noite do Castelo” (1861); “Joanna de Flandres” (1863), Revista brasileira de música, III, 201–45.
- 1987 - Carlos Gomes: Projeção no exterior, Carlos Gomes, uma obra em foco, ed. V. Salles (Rio de Janeiro), 67–88
- 1988 - O Villa-Lobos que eu conheci, Revista do Brasil, IV/1, 25–30.
