= New Philharmonic Society =

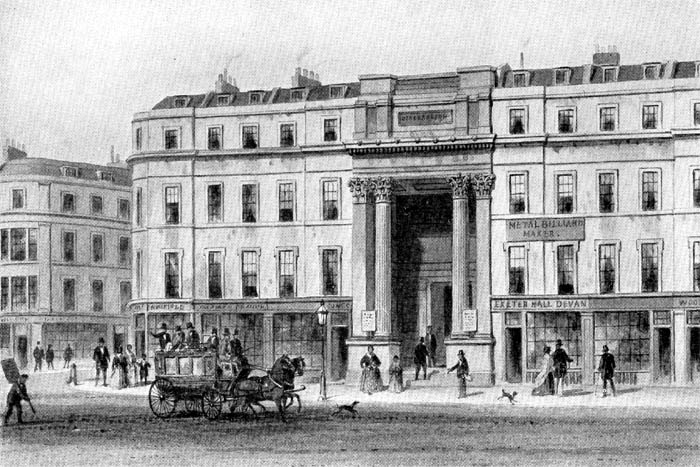
Exeter Hall, the venue of the Society's concerts for the first two seasons

The New Philharmonic Society was a British music society, established in 1852, giving annual series of subscription concerts of orchestral music in London until 1879. The concerts in the first season were conducted by Hector Berlioz.

== History ==
=== Prospectus ===
The prospectus of the Society, for the first season of six concerts, was written by its secretary Thomas Willert Beale in January 1852 (referring to "an elder institution" – the existing Philharmonic Society):

It is proposed, not only to extend a knowledge of the productions of the greatest masters, by a more perfect performance of their works than has hitherto been attained, but likewise to give to modern and native Composers a favourable opportunity for establishing the worth of their claims upon the attention and esteem of a discerning public.... Exclusiveness, the baneful hindrance to all progress of Art, will not be tolerated in this Society.... The New Philharmonic Society does not entertain the opinion acted upon by an elder institution, that no schools but those which may be called classical are to be considered as capable of affording pleasure..."

For this first season, the conductor was Hector Berlioz, the venue was Exeter Hall, and the subscription was 2 guineas for reserved seats, 1 guinea for professional subscribers.

=== Inaugural concert ===
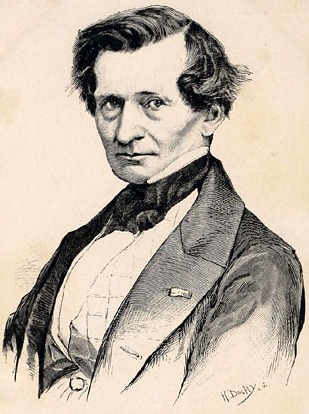
Hector Berlioz in 1855

The new venture was reported in The Times: "That such an institution as the New Philharmonic Society has long been wanted, there can be little doubt. Music has made such ample strides lately that it is not an easy task to keep pace with the general progress."

The string section of the orchestra had 16 first violins, led by Camillo Sivori; 16 second violins, led by Leopold Jansa; 12 violas, led by Goffrio; 12 cellos led by Carlo Alfredo Piatti; and 12 double basses led by Giovanni Bottesini.

The inaugural concert, on 24 March 1852, was given to an audience of about 1,500. The programme was:

- Jupiter symphony, by Mozart
- Selection from Iphigenia in Tauride, by Gluck
- Triple Concerto, by Beethoven: soloists Edouard Silas, Camillo Sivori and Carlo Alfredo Piatti
- Overture Oberon, by Weber
- Romeo and Juliet, Part 1, by Berlioz: vocal soloists Charlotte Dolby and Charles Lockey
- Fantasia for contrabasso, by Giovanni Bottesini
- Overture Guillaume Tell, by Rossini

The reviewer in The Times wrote that "a band so numerous and efficient was never before heard in an English concert-room". Describing "The grand novelty of the concert" – Berlioz's Romeo and Juliet – he wrote, "The attention with which the whole performance was listened to demonstrated the sincere desire of the audience to value the merits of M. Berlioz to the very extent of their capacity...."

=== Subsequent concerts ===
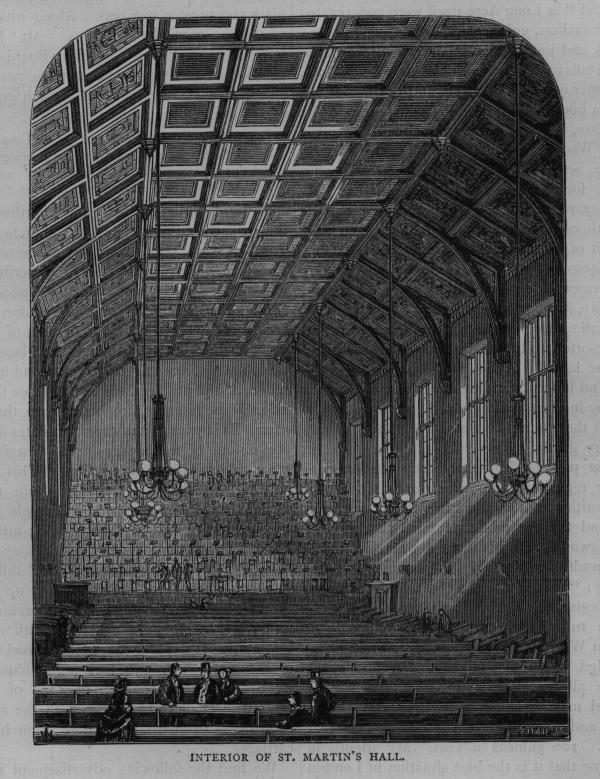
St Martin's Hall, concert venue for the third season

Other works performed in the first season included Beethoven's Symphony No. 5 and Symphony No. 9 (performed twice), Mendelssohn's Italian Symphony, selections from Berlioz's Faust, Spontini's Vestale, Henry Smart's Gnome of Hartzburg, and Henry Wylde's Prayer and Praise.

The six concerts of the second season were conducted, four by Peter Josef von Lindpaintner, and two by Louis Spohr, with Henry Wylde. The orchestra was enlarged (with 24 first violins), and the programmes included works by Beethoven, Spohr, Weber, Cherubini, Lindpaintner, Mendelssohn, Henry Wylde, Gluck, John Barnett and Silas.

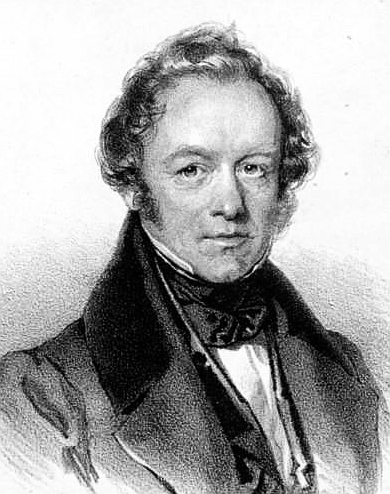
Peter Josef von Lindpaintner, conductor of concerts in the second and third seasons

The concerts of the third season took place at St Martin's Hall; they were conducted partly by Lindpaintner and partly by Wylde. For the fourth season they returned to Exeter Hall. For the fifth and sixth, in 1856 and 1857, the venue was the Hanover Square Rooms. In 1858 Henry Wylde assumed responsibility for the concerts, and they were held in St James's Hall until 1879.

=== End of the Society ===
The concert of 21 June 1879 was the last given by the New Philharmonic Society. On 24 April 1880, the first of "Mr Ganz's Orchestral Concerts", organized by Wilhelm Ganz, took place. The programme was similar to that of the concerts of the New Philharmonic; a reviewer noted that it "fills the place till now occupied by the New Philharmonic".

Wylde notified in a letter to The Times that concerts of the New Philharmonic Society had not yet been resumed; "other announced orchestral concerts have nothing to do with those of the New Philharmonic". Ganz, in reply, wrote that his concerts should be regarded as a continuation of the New Philharmonic's concerts. "The only alteration will be that of the name, Dr Wylde connecting the use of the old, familiar title with conditions unacceptable to me". Ganz's concerts came to an end after three years.
