= Thomas Wingham =

English composer (1846–1893)

Thomas Wingham (5 January 1846 – 24 March 1893) was an English composer, known as a teacher and for his time at Brompton Oratory.

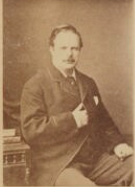
Thomas Wingham (1846-1893)

== Life ==
Thomas Wingham was born in London on 5 January 1846 and became organist of St Michael's Mission Church, Southwark, London in 1856. In 1863 he began to study at Wylde's London Academy and was appointed organist of All Saints' Paddington, London in 1864. In 1867 he entered the Royal Academy of Music, London, studying under William Sterndale Bennett for theory and Harold Thomas for piano. Further appointments included a piano professorship at the Royal Academy in 1871, a professorship at the Guildhall School of Music, London, and musical director at the Oratory, Brompton, London, in 1882 (Wingham had converted to the Catholic Church in the 1870s). He commissioned the Mass in G, Op.46 from Charles Villiers Stanford, who dedicated the score upon publication in 1892 to Wingham "in sincere regard", although the first performance did not take place until 26 May 1893 at the Brompton Oratory following Wingham's death: he died in London on 24 March 1893.

An early highlight of his career was the performance of his large-scale Mass Regina Coeli in Antwerp Cathedral in 1876. Reviewing the vocal score published by Novello, Ewer & Co. in 1878, The Musical Times judged it as

"a work which, taken for all in all, does credit to English art, and deserves a place among the worthy things."

Several of Wingham's large-scale works were heard at the Crystal Palace, London. The first performance there of his Concert Overture No.4 led The Musical Times to describe Wingham as

"one of the most talented and promising of the younger school of English composers. Mr. Wingham's latest work is constructed on very pleasing subjects, skilfully treated and effectively scored; its reception was deservedly hearty, and the composer received the honour of a call at the conclusion of his work."

Substantial orchestral scores by Wingham were programmed at the Brighton Festival in 1879 and the Leeds Festival in 1880: assessing the Concert Overture No.5, The Musical Times noted that

"The work is peculiar in character, and one must dissipate a sense of strangeness before a calm estimate can be arrived at. At present it seems to me that the Overture is either very beautiful or very much the reverse. In the former case its beauty is uncommon, but anyhow Mr. Wingham has boldly striven after originality, and earned the credit due to one who is not satisfied to plod along a beaten track."

The same journal reported of Wingham's Concert Overture No.6 that

"Mr. Wingham has here written specially to honour the memory of his lately deceased father, and, if the overture be nothing startling, it is at least artistic and expressive. Meanwhile, let the fact suffice that the overture was received at Leeds with marked favour, the composer being much applauded and recalled."

In 1885 Wingham secured a prestigious first performance of his Serenade in E flat under the auspices of the Philharmonic Society, London, a rendition again reviewed by The Musical Times which described him as

"an English composer, who had already evinced high ability in several Concert overtures, which, like his new work, are prefixed with a few lines of poetry indicative of their general character, and the feelings they are intended to inspire. In the first and second [movements] the delicate orchestral effects merit attention, the writing for the woodwind and muted strings being very charming. The composer also displays his musicianship in playful little canons and phrases treated in imitation. More energy is exhibited in the finale, but the music never becomes strident or noisy. On the whole, we consider this to be Mr. Wingham's best effort, and it evidently made a highly favourable impression on the audience, for the composer received a double recall."

After his death, very little of Wingham's music was ever heard again, although Dan Godfrey later played the Symphony No.2 twice at Bournemouth (in 1902 and 1908).

An obituary by his friend Louis N. Parker (1852-1944) was published in The Musical Times:

"Wingham was then, in a very beautiful sense, the favourite pupil of Sir Sterndale Bennett. The old class-room in which Bennett taught [...] was occupied one morning every week by an enthusiastic band of young composers who were all going to do marvellous things some day. Alas, where are the snows of yester-year? The only one who in any degree justified his own hopes was Thomas Wingham - and he is dead. I should imagine it is not known to many what a mountain of manuscripts he has left behind. Who, for instance, has heard his Choral Symphony? And who, again, knows much about his opera "Nala and Damayanti"? Has it ever been orchestrated? Wingham's career as a composer furnishes much food for reflection, and should be taken to heart by all young students who are today looking with eager eyes into the future, where they see visions of glory and worldly reward. He was a man of exquisitely delicate fancy, his melodic gift was distinguished, his learning was deep, the modern orchestra had no secrets for him, and his ideals were lofty. Now he was planning a symphony, now a quartet, now a concerto, or again an opera. The Philharmonic Concerts were open to him, and Mr. Manns (August Manns) was a staunch friend and admirer. Granting his genius, he should by rights have been one of the glories of musical England. Why has he fallen short of that? I venture to think because he got into the whirlpool of teaching and examining which devours so many of our brightest talents. His responsibilities were onerous, and as he was a man of honour he shirked none of them. Two paths lay open to him: either to live for his art or to live for his duties. He chose the latter, and among his friends and those who were dependent on him his memory will be all the sweeter for his choice; but I think his own artistic development was hindered thereby, and I am sure the world is the loser. Social life in England absorbs artistic life and - bitter as it is to say - it seems almost impossible to be at the same time a great artist and a good citizen, unless one has independent means or scorns delights and lives laborious days. Wingham's day was laborious enough in all conscience, but he spent himself on others."

Following his death, the following letter appeared in The Musical Times:

"SIR,- in reply to the admirable article of Mr. L. N. Parker in your May issue, it will please your readers, I am sure, to know that the whole of the late Mr. Thomas Wingham's manuscripts are in the hands of his executors, and the publication of many of them, it is hoped, will only be a matter of time and opportunity. I am, Sir, yours sincerely, J. ROBINSON. 4 Stratford Road, Marloes Road, Kensington, W., May 19, 1893."

== Works ==
=== Opera ===
- Nala and Damayanti (unfinished)

=== Orchestral ===
- 1869 - Symphony No.1 in D minor (Royal Academy of Music, London, 23 July 1870)
- 1872 - Symphony No.2 in B flat (Crystal Palace, London, 23 March 1872)
- 1872 - Festal Overture, Concert Overture No.1 in C (Royal Academy of Music, London, 22 July 1872; revised version Crystal Palace, London, 2 November 1872)
- 1873 - Symphony No. 3 in E minor (with choral finale)
- 1875 - Elegy on the death of Sterndale Bennett (Crystal Palace, London, 6 March 1875)
- 1875 - Eros, Concert Overture No.2 (British Orchestral Society, St James's Hall, London, 19 May 1875; revised version Crystal Palace, London, 27 November 1875)
- 1878 - Fair laughs the morn (Thomas Gray), Concert Overture No.4 in F (Crystal Palace, London, 16 February 1878)
- 1879 - Love took up the glass of time (Tennyson), Concert Overture No.5 in A (Brighton Festival, 12 February 1879; revised version Crystal Palace, London, 7 March 1885)
- 1880 - Mors Janua Vitae, Concert Overture No.6 in D (Leeds Festival, 15 October 1880)
- 1883 - Symphony No.4 (Crystal Palace, London, 28 April 1883)
- 1885 - How sweet the moonlight sleeps upon this bank (Shakespeare), Serenade in E flat (Philharmonic Society, St James's Hall, London, 26 March 1885)
- Symphony in D, Op.4

=== Instrumental soloist and orchestra ===
- 1875 - Andante and Allegro Capriccioso for piano and orchestra, Op.5
- 1885 - Concert Capriccio in E minor for piano and orchestra

=== Choral and vocal ===
- 1873 - Symphony No.3 in E minor for chorus and orchestra (two movements performed Royal Academy of Music, London, 26 July 1873)
- 1876 - Regina Coeli, mass in D for voices and orchestra, Op.14 (Cathedral, Antwerp, 15 August 1876)
- 1877 - Concert Overture No.3 in D for voices, orchestra and organ (Alexandra Palace, London, 10 May 1877)
- 1884 - Te Deum for voices, orchestra and organ (Oratory, Brompton, London, 25 April 1884)
- 1887 - Mass (Oratory, Brompton, London, 1887)

=== Chamber music ===
- 1885 - Hommage à Gounod, serenade for cello with piano and organ obligati, Op.17
- 1889 - String Quartet in G minor (Princes' Hall, London, 7 May 1889)
- String Quartet in B flat
- Septet for piano, strings and wind

== Scores and manuscripts ==
Concert Overture No.1 and Symphony No.2 were published as piano duets by Lamborn Cock, London, together with a piano solo arrangement of the Elegy on the death of Sterndale Bennett. Novello, Ewer & Co., London, published the Serenade in E flat as a piano duet. Alfred Hays, London (for Lamborn Cock, London), published a reduction of the Concert Capriccio. Novello, Ewer & Co., London, issued vocal scores of the Mass Regina Coeli and the Te Deum.

The autograph full score of Concert Overture No.4 (XX(175475.1)), together with autograph orchestral parts of Symphony No.1 (XX(175469.1)), the Elegy on the death of Sterndale Bennett (XX(175471.1)), Symphony in D, Op.4 (XX(175472.1)), the Andante and Allegro Capriccioso for piano and orchestra (XX(175473.1)), Concert Overture No.4 (XX(175476.1)), Concert Overture No.6 (XX(175477.1)) and Concerto Overture No.1 (XX(175478.1)/ XX(175479.1)) are held by the Library of the Royal Academy of Music, London.
