= International Music Council =

UNESCO's advisory body on matters of music

- Abbreviation: IMC
- Formation: 1949; 77 years ago
- Type: INGO
- Headquarters: Paris, France
- Region served: Worldwide
- Official language: English, French
- President: Dr. Sheila Woodward; United States
- Website: IMC Official website

The International Music Council (IMC) was created in 1949 as UNESCO's advisory body on matters of music. The original request of the foundation of the IMC was under the Director of the UNESCO. It is based at UNESCO's headquarters in Paris, France, where it functions as an independent international non-governmental organization. Its primary aim is to facilitate the development and promotion of international music-making.

The IMC currently consists of some 120 members, divided into four categories (National Music Councils, International Music Organisations, Regional Music Organisations, National and specialized organisations in the field of arts and culture). It is represented by regional councils in Europe, Africa, and the Americas. Their task is to develop and support programmes specifically tailored to the needs of the IMC members and partners in their region.

== History ==
=== Foundation ===
The International Music Council was founded by a musicologist Charles Seeger, the main purpose of the institute would be to bring countries around the world together to create peace and gathering through music. Charles Seeger wanted to do this with the support if diplomacy. Charles Seeger started a chain of ideas, which lead the Brazilian diplomat Luis Heitor Correa de Azevedo to influence the UNESCO. This chain of ideas lead to the establishment of the organization.

=== Four Experts ===
In 1948, Jaime Torres Bodet collected four experts to establish the four main music organization of the time. The organizations are International Society for Contemporary Music, the International Musicological Society, the International Federation of Jeunesses Musicales and the International Folk Music Council.

==== International Society for Contemporary Music ====
The International Society for Contemporary Music (ISCM) is an organization within the International Music organizations that has internationally network of members throughout the global to present the world with new music and announce contemporary. The ISCM spreads diversity of music throughout the global.

==== The International Musicological Society ====
The International Musicological Society (IMS) is one of the four experts. The International Musicological Society was founded from Basel, Switzerland. The main purpose of the IMS because is based membership based which is made for the study of music.

==== The International Federation of Jeunesse's Musicales ====
The International Federation of Jeunesse's Musicales is a non-governmental organization focus on the education for the young people around the globe. This is one of the largest organizations for the youth music network.

==== The International Folk Music Council ====
The International Folk Music Council represents 28 countries that focus on the preservation and documentation for the Folk music. Folk music is traditional music that goes generation to generation.

== Initiatives and actions ==
=== Five Music Rights ===
The International Music Council advocates for access to music to all, through a set of values which are at the basis of the action of both the International Music Council and its regional councils. Those core beliefs have been gathered under the name of Five Music Rights.

The Five Music Rights were first proclaimed in Tokyo during the International Music Council's General Assembly of 2001, and have since been promoted by the International Music Council and related bodies, through advocacy activities, programmes and other initiatives (such as the Music Rights Awards and the appointment of the " Music Rights Champions").

The principles contained in the Five Music Rights (originally written in English) have been translated into French, Spanish, Arabic, and Mandarin Chinese.

IMC undertakes many initiatives within the music ecosystem – such as developing projects, organizing conferences, awarding prizes, etc. Projects are international, regional and sometimes local and are often supported by international, intergovernmental and supranational organizations.

=== International Rostrum of Composers ===
One of the IMC's regular activities is the annual International Rostrum of Composers, a forum offering representatives of national broadcasting organisations the opportunity to exchange and publicize works of contemporary classical music.

=== IMC UNESCO Music Prize ===
The IMC UNESCO Music Prize was awarded from 1975 until 2005 by the International Music Council, as of 1978 in cooperation with UNESCO. The Prize was addressed to both musicians and musical institutions, in alignment with the purposes of the United Nations Charter and UNESCO's Constitution. The Prize was assessed by four categories: composition, musicology, pedagogy, and performance. The last laureate of the IMC UNESCO Music Prize was Mikis Theodorakis.

=== African Music Development Programme ===
The African Music Development Programme, launched in 2014 by the International Music Council, took place in nine African countries.

The 3-years-long project was implemented with the financial support of the European Union and the technical assistance of the Organisation of African, Caribbean and Pacific States (ACP), and aimed at supporting the music industry through a series of targeted actions.

=== Advocacy ===
The main arena for IMC advocacy is UNESCO, specifically the 1980 Recommendation concerning the Status of the Artist, the 2003 Convention for the Safeguarding of the Intangible Cultural Heritage and the 2005 Convention on the Protection and Promotion of the Diversity of Cultural Expressions.

Some advocacy actions are carried out in alliance with other international organisations such as the #Culture2030Goal campaign for the inclusion of culture among the Sustainable Development Goals.

=== International Music Day ===
The International Music Day was initiated in 1975 by Yehudi Menuhin, former president of the IMC. It is celebrated worldwide on October 1.

== IMC presidents ==
- Dr. Sheila Woodward (2023–present), United States
- Alfons Karabuda (2019–2023), Sweden
- Emily Achieng' Akuno (2017–2019), Kenya
- Paul Dujardin (2013–2017), Belgium
- Frans de Ruiter (1998–2001; 2009–2013), Netherlands
- Richard Letts (2005–2009), Australia
- Kifah Fakhouri (2001–2005), Jordan
- Jordi Roch (1994–1997), Spain
- Eskil Hemberg (1992–1993), Sweden
- Lupwishi Mbuyamba (1988–1991), Zaire
- Marlos Nobre (1986–1987), Brazil
- Gottfried Scholz (1984–1985), Austria
- Barry S. Brook (1982–1983), United States
- Frank Callaway (1980–1981), Australia
- John Peter Lee Roberts (1978–1979), Canada
- Yehudi Menuhin (1969–1975), United States
- Narayana Menon (1967–1968; 1976–1977), India
- Vladimir Fédorov (1965–1966), France
- Mario Labroca (1959–1964), Italy
- Domingo Santa Cruz (1957–1958), Chile
- Steuart Wilson (1954–1956), United Kingdom
- Roland Manuel (1950–1953), France

== See also ==
- International Council for Traditional Music
