= Royal Philharmonic Society =

British musical society

Coordinates: 51.5144°N 0.1384°W

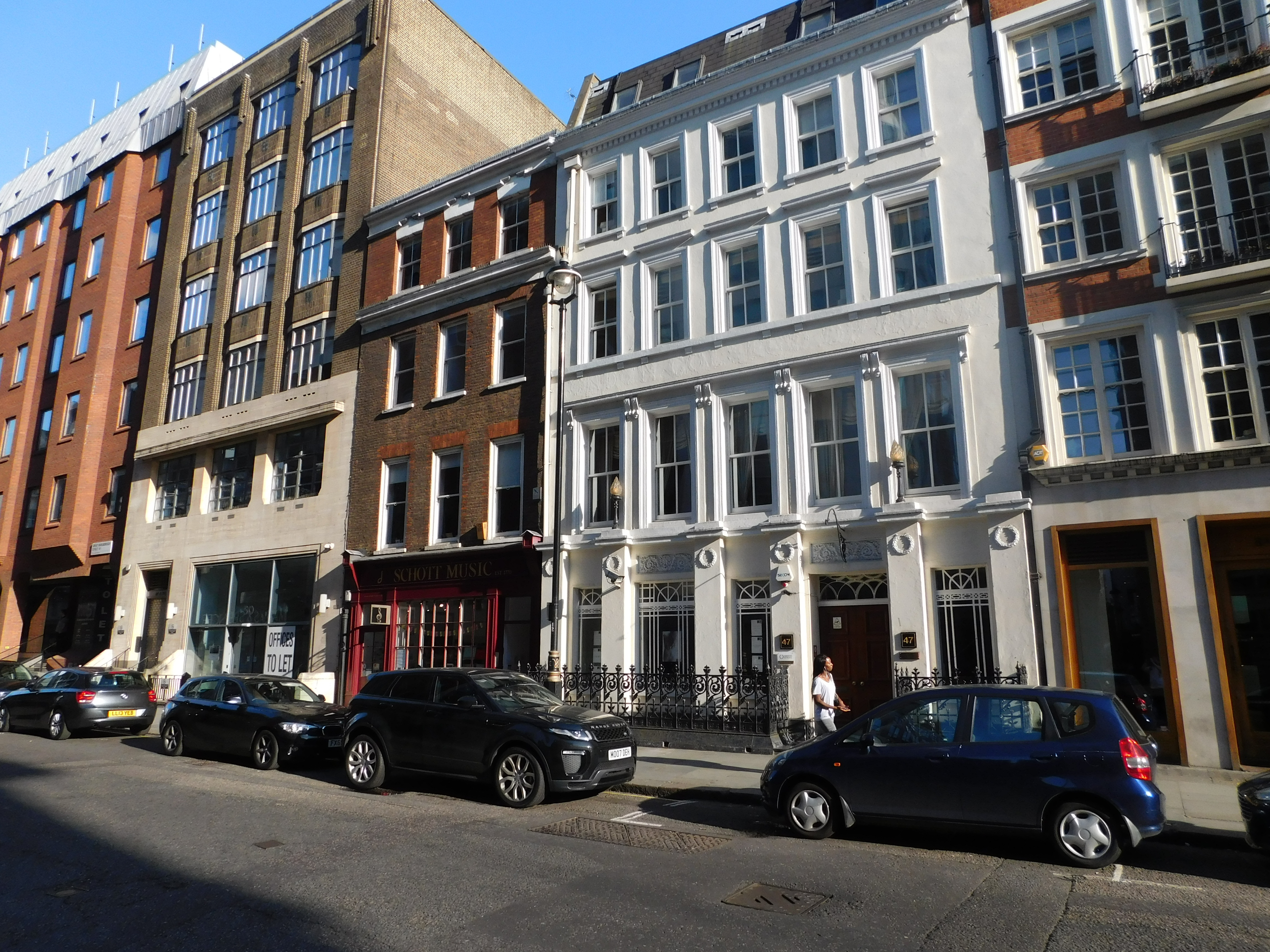
Society headquarters on Great Marlborough Street

The Royal Philharmonic Society (RPS) is a British music society, formed in 1813. Its original purpose was to promote performances of instrumental music in London. Many composers and performers have taken part in its concerts. It is now a membership society, and while it no longer has its own orchestra, it continues a wide-ranging programme of activities which focus on composers and young musicians. Since 1989, the RPS has promoted the annual Royal Philharmonic Society Music Awards for live music-making in the United Kingdom.

The RPS is a registered UK charity No. 213693, located at 48 Great Marlborough Street in London. The current chief executive of the RPS is James Murphy, and its current chair is Angela Dixon.

== History ==
In London, at a time when there were no permanent London orchestras, nor organised series of chamber music concerts, a group of thirty music professionals formed the Philharmonic Society of London on 6 February 1813. The idea was that by cooperating, they could build a stronger orchestra than by competing against one another. However, given the organization's choice to hold its concerts at the Argyll Rooms, it is likely that the society was initiated because of John Nash's bold urban redesign of Regent Street. In this way, the society would gain an impressive performing space once the old Argyll Rooms had to be rebuilt due to the Regent Street plan, and Prince regent George IV could promote classical music as a British institution and thereby improve his reputation. Concerts were held in the Argyll Rooms until it burned down in 1830.

The Society's aim was "to promote the performance, in the most perfect manner possible, of the best and most approved instrumental music". Among the founders were the pianist and violinist William Dance (who became the society's first secretary and later its treasurer), composer Henry Bishop, and Charles Neate, a pianist and friend of Beethoven, who publicised Beethoven's music at the Society.Another member was the famous Polish composer and violinist in exile Feliks Janiewicz, who is also the co-founder of the famous Edinburgh Festival.

The first concert, on 8 March 1813, was presided over by Johann Peter Salomon, with Muzio Clementi at the piano, performing symphonies by Luigi Cherubini, Wolfgang Amadeus Mozart, Ludwig van Beethoven, Joseph Haydn, Luigi Boccherini and Antonio Sacchini. That year, 8 concerts were performed, during the London season.

The Society asked Beethoven to come to London, but the composer's health prevented his accepting the invitation. However the society's request for a new symphony from him resulted in the Choral Symphony. In 1827 Beethoven wrote to the society outlining his straitened economic and health circumstances; at a special general meeting the society resolved to send the composer £100 immediately (equivalent to £9,100 in 2025); George Bernard Shaw once referred to this as "the only entirely creditable incident in English history").

Felix Mendelssohn also wrote his Italian Symphony for the Society, which he finished in 1833. Distinguished conductors included Ludwig Spohr, one of the first conductors to use a baton, Hector Berlioz, who conducted a concert of his works in 1853, Richard Wagner, who conducted the whole 1855 season of orchestral concerts, William Sterndale Bennett for the following ten years, Arthur Sullivan, and Tchaikovsky, who conducted his own works in 1888 and 1893.

From 1830 to 1869, the Society gave its concerts in the concert-hall of Hanover Square Rooms, which had seating for only about 800. The Society decided to move permanently to St James's Hall, and a complimentary additional concert, held at the hall, was given to its subscribers at the end of the 1868–69 season. Charles Santley, Charles Hallé, Thérèse Tietjens and Christina Nilsson were the soloists. When the move was made, the Society remodelled its charges to obtain a wider audience and compete with the Crystal Palace and other large venues, and introduced annotated programmes. The Society remained at the hall until 28 February 1894, when it moved to the Queen's Hall.

The society became the Royal Philharmonic Society during its 100th concert season in 1912, and continued organising concerts through the two world wars. It is now a membership society which "seeks to create a future for music through the encouragement of creativity, the recognition of excellence and the promotion of understanding."

- See Works commissioned by the RPS for a list of works commissioned by or dedicated to the Royal Philharmonic Society.

== The Gold Medal ==
The Gold Medal was first awarded in 1871. The medal depicts the profile of a bust of Beethoven by Johann Nepomuk Schaller (1777–1842) which was presented to the society in 1870, Beethoven's centenary. It is awarded for "outstanding musicianship", and is given rarely – in 2015 the medal was awarded for the hundredth time.

=== Recipients ===
==== 19th century ====
- 1871
  - Sir William Sterndale Bennett
  - Christina Nilsson
  - Charles Gounod
  - Joseph Joachim
  - Helen Lemmens-Sherrington
  - Arabella Goddard
  - Sir Charles Santley
  - William Cusins
  - Thérèse Tietjens
  - Felix Janiewicz
  - Fanny Linzbauer (the donor of the bust of Beethoven)
- 1872
  - Euphrosyne Parepa-Rosa
- 1873
  - Hans von Bülow
- 1876
  - Louisa Bodda-Pyne
  - Anton Rubinstein
- 1877
  - Johannes Brahms
- 1880
  - Stanley Lucas
- 1895
  - Adelina Patti
- 1897
  - Dame Emma Albani
  - Ignacy Jan Paderewski

==== 20th century ====
- 1900
  - Edward Lloyd
- 1901
  - Eugène Ysaÿe
- 1902
  - Jan Kubelík
- 1903
  - Dame Clara Butt
- 1904
  - Fritz Kreisler
- 1909
  - Louise Kirkby Lunn
- 1910
  - Emil von Sauer
- 1912
  - Pablo Casals
  - Harold Bauer
  - Luisa Tetrazzini
- 1914
  - Muriel Foster
- 1916
  - Vladimir de Pachmann
- 1921
  - Sir Henry Wood
- 1922
  - Sir Alexander Mackenzie
- 1923
  - Alfred Cortot
- 1925
  - Frederick Delius
  - Sir Edward Elgar
- 1928
  - Sir Thomas Beecham
- 1930
  - Ralph Vaughan Williams
  - Gustav Holst
- 1931
  - Arnold Bax
- 1932
  - Sergei Rachmaninoff
- 1934
  - Sir Edward German
  - Sir Hamilton Harty
- 1935
  - Jean Sibelius
- 1936
  - Richard Strauss
- 1937
  - Felix Weingartner
  - Arturo Toscanini
- 1942
  - Dame Myra Hess
- 1944
  - Sergei Prokofiev
  - Sir Adrian Boult
- 1947
  - Sir William Walton
- 1950
  - Sir John Barbirolli
- 1953
  - Kathleen Ferrier
- 1954
  - Igor Stravinsky
- 1957
  - Bruno Walter
- 1959
  - Sir Malcolm Sargent
- 1961
  - Arthur Rubinstein
- 1962
  - Yehudi Menuhin
- 1963
  - Sir Arthur Bliss
  - Pierre Monteux
- 1964
  - Lionel Tertis
  - Benjamin Britten
- 1966
  - Dmitri Shostakovich
- 1967
  - Zoltán Kodály
- 1970
  - Mstislav Rostropovich
- 1972
  - Vladimir Horowitz
- 1975
  - Olivier Messiaen
- 1976
  - Sir Michael Tippett
- 1980
  - Sir Clifford Curzon
- 1984
  - Herbert von Karajan
- 1986
  - Andrés Segovia
  - Witold Lutosławski
- 1987
  - Leonard Bernstein
- 1988
  - Dietrich Fischer-Dieskau
- 1989
  - Sir Georg Solti
- 1990
  - Claudio Arrau
  - Janet Baker
  - Bernard Haitink
  - Sviatoslav Richter
- 1991
  - Isaac Stern
- 1992
  - Alfred Brendel
- 1994
  - Sir Colin Davis
- 1995
  - Elliott Carter
  - Rafael Kubelík
- 1997
  - Pierre Boulez

==== 21st century ====
- 2000
  - Plácido Domingo
  - Sir Simon Rattle
- 2002
  - Dame Joan Sutherland
- 2003
  - Claudio Abbado
- 2004
  - György Ligeti
- 2005
  - Sir Charles Mackerras
- 2007
  - Daniel Barenboim
- 2008
  - Henri Dutilleux
- 2009
  - Thomas Quasthoff
- 2010
  - Nikolaus Harnoncourt
- 2012
  - Dame Mitsuko Uchida
- 2013
  - Sir András Schiff
  - György Kurtág
- 2014
  - Sir John Tomlinson
- 2015
  - Sir Antonio Pappano
  - Martha Argerich
- 2016
  - Sir Peter Maxwell Davies
- 2017
  - Charles Dutoit
  - Mariss Jansons
- 2018
  - Jessye Norman
- 2019
  - Sofia Gubaidulina
- 2020
  - John Williams
- 2021
  - Vladimir Jurowski
- 2023
  - Anne-Sophie Mutter
- 2024
  - Thomas Adès
  - Arvo Pärt
  - Yo-Yo Ma
- 2025
  - Víkingur Ólafsson

== Honorary membership ==
Through awarding honorary membership the society recognises "services to music". Like the Gold Medal, honorary membership is awarded rarely; first awarded in 1826, by 2006 only 117 honorary members had been created.

=== Honorary members ===
- 1826
  - Carl Maria von Weber
- 1829
  - Daniel Auber
  - Jean-François Le Sueur
  - Felix Mendelssohn
  - Giacomo Meyerbeer
  - George Onslow
- 1830
  - Johann Nepomuk Hummel
- 1836
  - Sigismond Thalberg
- 1839
  - Gioachino Rossini
- 1859
  - Hector Berlioz
  - Niels Gade
  - Fromental Halévy
  - Moritz Hauptmann
  - Ferdinand Hiller
  - Franz Liszt
  - Heinrich Marschner
  - Ignaz Moscheles
  - Julius Rietz
  - Johannes Verhulst
- 1860
  - Richard Wagner
- 1861
  - Euphrosyne Parepa-Rosa
- 1869
  - Lucy Anderson
- 1869
  - Otto Goldschmidt
  - Charles Gounod
  - Stephen Heller
  - Thérèse Tietjens
- 1870
  - Joseph Joachim
- 1882
  - Johannes Brahms
  - Joachim Raff
  - Alberto Randegger
  - Giuseppe Verdi
- 1884
  - Antonín Dvořák
  - Sophie Menter
  - Wassily Sapellnikoff
  - Pablo de Sarasate
- 1885
  - Giovanni Bottesini
  - Hans von Bülow
- 1886
  - Franz Rummel
- 1887
  - Moritz Moszkowski
  - Camille Saint-Saëns
  - Clara Schumann
- 1888
  - Johan Svendsen
- 1889
  - Edvard Grieg
  - Pyotr Ilyich Tchaikovsky
  - Charles-Marie Widor
- 1891
  - František Ondříček
  - Eugène Ysaÿe
- 1893
  - Ignacy Jan Paderewski
- 1894
  - Max Bruch
- 1897
  - Emil von Sauer
  - Alexander Glazunov
- 1899
  - Moriz Rosenthal
- 1902
  - Sergei Rachmaninoff
  - Jules Massenet
- 1906
  - Raoul Pugno
  - Hans Richter
  - Richard Strauss
- 1908
  - Jan Kubelík
- 1912
  - Vasily Safonov
- 1913
  - Willem Mengelberg
  - Arthur Nikisch
- 1921
  - Alfred Cortot
  - Maurice Ravel
  - Igor Stravinsky
  - Arturo Toscanini
- 1922
  - Harold Bauer
- 1927
  - Leopold Stokowski
- 1929
  - Jean Sibelius
- 1930
  - Pablo Casals
- 1948
  - Keith Douglas (Hon. Sec. of the Society)
  - John Mewburn Levien
- 1951
  - Frederic Austin
  - Ernest Irving
- 1953
  - Marion Scott
  - Albert Schweitzer
- 1959
  - Arthur Rubinstein
- 1956
  - Paul Hindemith
  - Gregor Piatigorsky
- 1959
  - Benno Moiseiwitsch
- 1960
  - George Baker
- 1970
  - Aaron Copland
- 1971
  - William Glock
- 1984
  - Eric Fenby
- 1985
  - Lennox Berkeley
  - Dietrich Fischer-Dieskau
  - Yehudi Menuhin
  - Gerald Moore
  - Solomon
- 1986
  - Lorin Maazel
- 1987
  - Dame Janet Baker
  - Peter Maxwell Davies
  - Léon Goossens
- 1988
  - Claudio Arrau
  - Julian Bream
  - Bernard Haitink
- 1989
  - John Denison
  - Vernon Handley
- 1990
  - Sir Charles Groves
  - Rafael Kubelík
- 1991
  - Thomas Armstrong
  - Harrison Birtwistle
  - Pierre Boulez
  - Elliott Carter
  - Joan Cross
  - György Ligeti
  - Paul Sacher
  - Katharine, Duchess of Kent
- 1994
  - Felix Aprahamian
  - Sir Charles Mackerras
- 1996
  - Howard Ferguson
- 1997
  - John Gardner
- 1998
  - George Lascelles, 7th Earl of Harewood
  - Sir George Christie
- 1999
  - Sir David Willcocks
  - Richard Steinitz
  - Philip Jones
  - Anthony Payne
- 2001
  - Evelyn Barbirolli
- 2002
  - Oliver Knussen
- 2004
  - Richard McNicol
- 2006
  - Michael Kennedy
- 2007
  - David Lloyd-Jones
- 2008
  - José Antonio Abreu
- 2009
  - Brian McMaster
- 2010
  - Graham Johnson
  - Fanny Waterman
- 2011
  - George Benjamin
  - Tony Fell
  - Mark Elder
- 2012
  - John Stephens
- 2013
  - Ricardo Castro (Bahia, Brazil)
  - Armand Diangienda (Kinshasa, DRC)
  - Aaron Dworkin (USA)
  - Rosemary Nalden (Soweto, SA)
  - Ahmad Sarmast (Kabul, Afghanistan)
- 2014
  - Martin Campbell-White (artist manager)
  - Marin Alsop
- 2015
  - Evelyn Glennie
- 2016
  - Graham Vick
- 2017
  - Barrie Gavin
- 2018
  - Stephen Hough
- 2019
  - Stephen Sondheim
  - Alexander Goehr
  - David Pountney
- 2022
  - Jordi Savall
- 2024
  - Yo-Yo Ma

== See also ==
- New Philharmonic Society
