= Charles Haubiel =

American composer and pianist

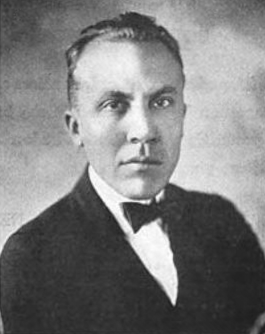
- In Musical Advance, July 1924
- Born: Charles Trowbridge Haubiel; January 30, 1892; Delta, Ohio
- Died: August 26, 1978 (aged 86); Los Angeles, California
- Occupation: Composer

Charles Trowbridge Haubiel (January 30, 1892 – August 26, 1978) was an American composer. He toured as a pianist and a lecturer. He composed three operas in addition to much orchestral and chamber music. His music has been described as a combination of Johannes Brahms and Claude Debussy.

== Biography ==
Charles Haubiel was born in Delta, Ohio, on January 30, 1892. Having first studied piano under his sister, Florence Pratt Morey, he, at the age of sixteen, continued his music instruction in Berlin with Martin Krause and Rudolph Ganz. Later, in New York City, he studied piano under Josef and Rosina Lhévinne, counterpoint with Rosario Scalero, and orchestration with Modest Altschuler.

In New York City, from 1921 to 1931, he taught piano at the Institute of Musical Art, now known as Juilliard, and at New York University from 1923 to 1947.

In 1935, he organized The Composers' Press in order to promote the works of contemporary American composers.

He died at his home in Los Feliz, Los Angeles, on August 26, 1978.

== Compositions ==
During World War I, he was stationed in Paris, where he composed his Portraits for solo piano in 1919. The three movements were musical portraits of his friends Lee Pattison, Guy Maier, and Edwin Sauter. An orchestral version of the piece, under the title Tre Ritratti Characteristici, won the Swift Symphonic Contest in 1935, and was subsequently premiered by Frederick Stock and the Chicago Symphony Orchestra.

His set of variations for orchestra, Karma, won first prize in the 1928 International Columbia Graphophone Competition.
