= Willie Cooper Hobby =

First Lady of Texas (1876–1929)

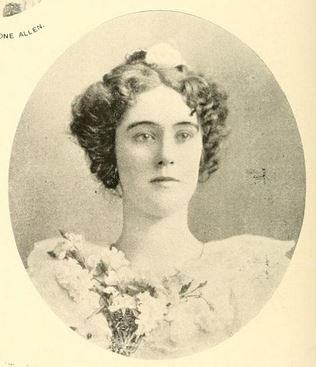
- Willie Chapman Cooper in 1895

First Lady of Texas
- In office August 25, 1917 – January 18, 1921
- Governor: William P. Hobby
- Preceded by: Miriam A. Ferguson
- Succeeded by: Myrtle Mainer Neff

Personal details
- Born: Willie Chapman Cooper; June 19, 1876 Woodville, Texas, U.S.
- Died: January 14, 1929 (aged 52) Houston, Texas, U.S.
- Cause of death: Apoplexy
- Resting place: Glenwood Cemetery, Houston, Texas, U.S.
- Spouse: William P. Hobby (m. 1915)
- Parent: Samuel B. Cooper (father)
- Education: North Texas Female College

Willie Chapman Cooper Hobby (June 19, 1876 – January 14, 1929) was the first wife of William P. Hobby, Governor of Texas from 1917 to 1921, and thus First Lady of Texas.

== Life ==
The daughter of Samuel B. Cooper, a lawyer who later became a United States Representative from Texas, Willie C. Cooper was born in Woodville and educated at Lucy Ann Kidd-Key's North Texas Female College, graduating with honors at the age of sixteen. She went with her father to Washington, D.C., where she was known as “Miss Willie”, and was a leader of Washington society as well as acting as her father’s secretary for many years. In 1910, her father lost his seat in Congress, and President William Howard Taft appointed him to the Board of General Appraisers in New York, where his daughter joined him.

On May 15, 1915, Miss Willie married William Pettus Hobby, a lawyer who was Lieutenant Governor of Texas, with James Edward Ferguson as Governor. In 1917, Ferguson was removed from office, and at the age of thirty-nine Hobby succeeded him, becoming the youngest man ever to hold office as Governor of Texas. Willie Hobby served as his First Lady until he retired in 1921.

In 1929, Mrs Hobby died suddenly at home, 3903 Montrose Boulevard, Houston, of apoplexy, and was buried at Glenwood Cemetery, Houston. In 1931, her widowed husband married secondly Oveta Culp.
