= Guy Maier =

American musician (1891–1956)

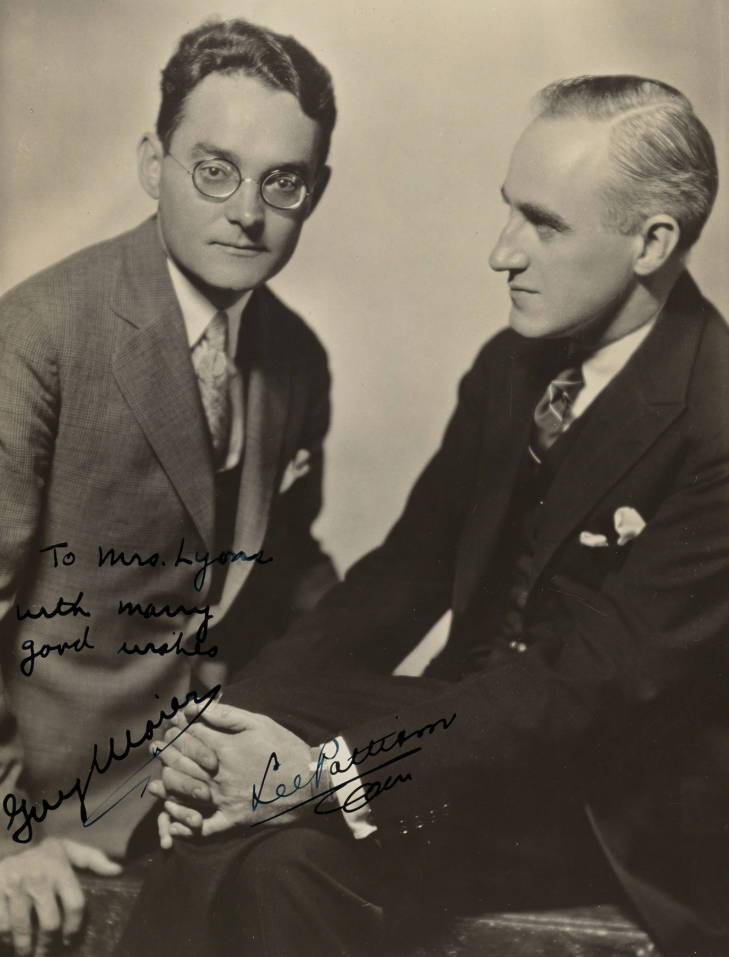
Guy Maier (left) and Lee Pattison in 1928

Guy Silas Maier (August 15, 1891, in Buffalo, New York – September 24, 1956, in Santa Monica, California) was an American pianist, composer, arranger, teacher, and writer. From about 1919 to 1931, he was a member of the two-piano team of Maier and Pattison.

== Early life ==
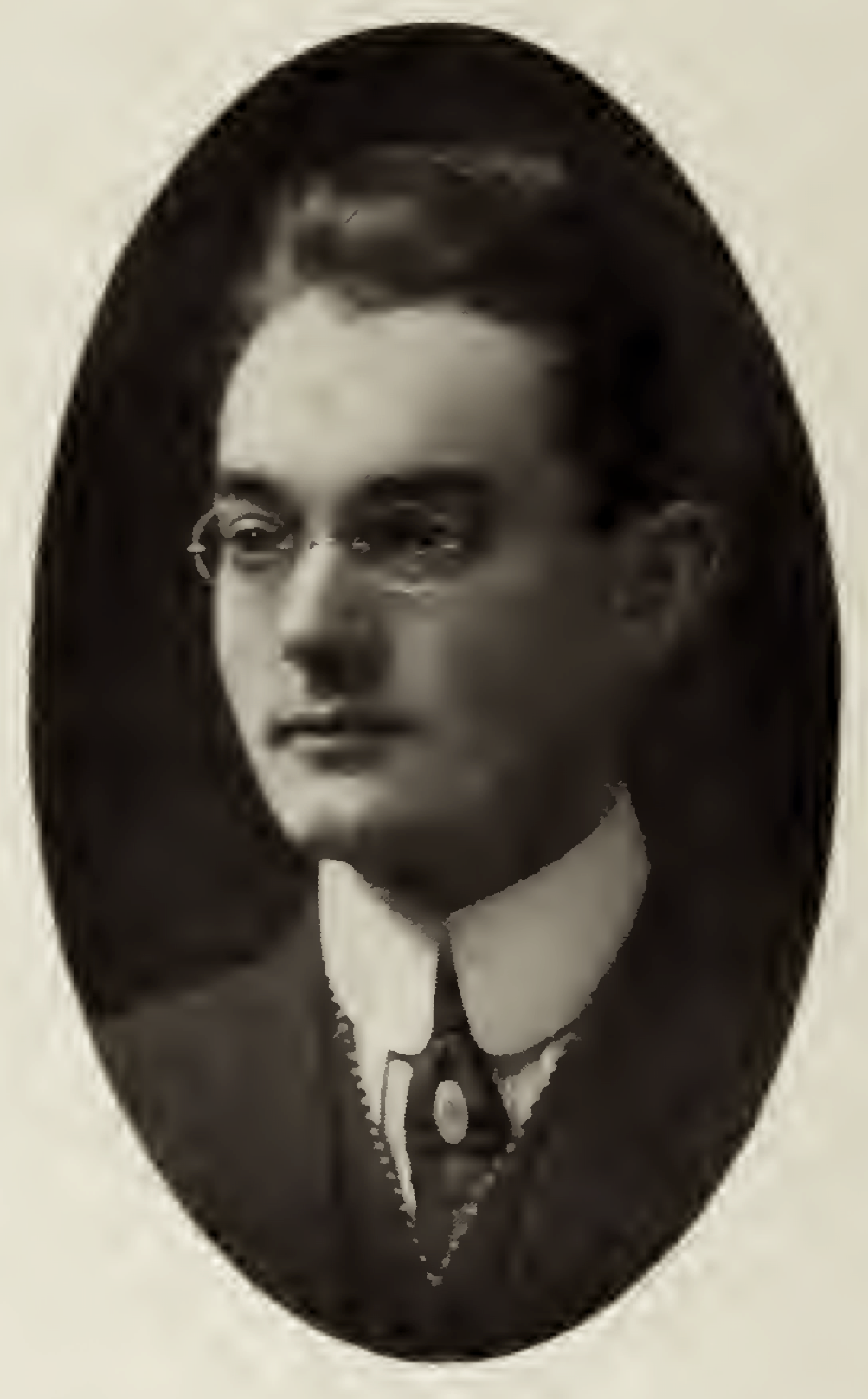
Guy Maier in 1913

Guy Maier was born in Buffalo, New York, the son of John Maier, a retail shoe dealer, and his wife, Eva D. Maier. As a boy, he aspired to be a Presbyterian minister, but his musical talent turned him in the direction of the piano and the organ. He enrolled at the New England Conservatory of Music in Boston, where he studied piano with Carl Baermann, a friend and pupil of Franz Liszt. In Boston, Maier met Lee Pattison, a recent New England Conservatory graduate who was also a fine pianist.

Following Maier's graduation in 1913, Maier and Pattison left together for Europe, where they hoped to become pupils of Harold Bauer, Josef Hofmann, or Artur Schnabel, all eminent pianists of the time. They found that Bauer was away and Hofmann took no pupils, but Schnabel agreed to teach them. So they went to Berlin, where Schnabel coached them for about a year. In Berlin, Schnabel and Maier formed a friendship that endured until Schnabel's death. Maier and Pattison returned to Boston in 1914, where Maier made his solo debut as a concert pianist.

== Career ==
=== Maier and Pattison ===
After Maier and Pattison heard a two-piano performance by Harold Bauer and Ossip Gabrilowitsch, they began to play together. When the United States entered World War I, Maier volunteered for the entertainment service of the YMCA, and Pattison joined the infantry. In France, they gave two-piano recitals for American troops. After the armistice, they gave a recital in Paris that was attended by President Woodrow Wilson and French Premier Georges Clemenceau. Playing classic works from the two-piano repertory in addition to their own arrangements of the works of great composers, Maier and Pattison traveled widely through the 1920s, giving two-piano concerts in the United States and Europe.

In 1922, they joined Leopold Godowsky in the final number of a concert in Carnegie Hall, where they played Godowsky's three-piano contrapuntal paraphrase of Carl Maria von Weber's Invitation to the Dance. Godowsky dedicated the work to Maier and Pattison. In 1928, they gave the Carnegie Hall premiere of Mozart's Andante and Variations, K. 501. As their reputation grew, they became known as "The Piano Twins". They also performed with orchestras in Boston, New York, Philadelphia, Chicago, and other cities. In 1931, they announced a "friendly split" and embarked on a farewell tour of the United States. Time magazine said they were "as difficult to dissociate as Rosencrantz & Guildenstern, liver & bacon or the Cherry Sisters". Both were "excellent musicians", Time said, but Maier was

[...] the better showman. He is more given to swaying over the keyboard, to making his crescendos look mighty as well as sounding so. He is not above making occasional impromptu speeches or working for a laugh. Pattison's contribution is just as important, but he makes it more quietly, focuses more on his piano.

In March 1937, Maier and Pattison joined in a reunion concert on the stage of the Works Progress Administration Theatre of Music in New York.

=== Recordings ===
Both individually and as a member of Maier and Pattison, Maier recorded piano rolls under the Welte Mignon and Ampico labels. He and Pattison were also pioneers in acoustic recording, producing popular recordings for the Victor Talking Machine Company in the early 1920s.

=== Recitals for young people ===
As a soloist (and sometimes joined by his wife Lois, also an accomplished pianist), Maier gave recitals for young people coupled with musical travelogues. "He is not only clever as a pianist," the Los Angeles Times reported, "but the way he keeps the attention of a grammar-school audience of squirming, tired-at-the-end-of-the-day youngsters is nothing short of miraculous. It is all fun to him and he makes the children 'see into' the music he plays with brief and witty words."

=== Teaching ===
Maier taught at the University of Michigan from 1921 to 1931, at the Juilliard School in New York from 1935 to 1942, and at the University of California at Los Angeles from 1946 to 1956. As a teacher, he traveled widely across the United States, giving master classes at colleges, universities, and private music schools. His notable piano students included Dalies Frantz and Leonard Pennario.

=== Etude Magazine ===
Beginning in November 1935, Maier began a long association with Etude Magazine. He wrote monthly columns, first under the heading of "The Teacher's Roundtable" and later "The Pianist's Page", in which he answered questions from piano teachers. Short pieces of pedagogical music sometimes accompanied the columns. After his death, a collection of his Etude columns was compiled by his widow and published under the title of The Piano Teacher's Companion.

=== Other activities ===
In 1937, Maier was regional director of the Works Progress Administration's music project in New York. In that capacity, he helped to organize orchestras, string quartets, bands and singing groups in twelve states. In 1940, he was awarded an honorary doctorate of music from the Sherwood Music School in Chicago.

== Family ==
Guy Maier and his wife, Lois Auten Maier (née Warner), had two sons, Robert A. Maier, born March 14, 1924, and Theodore C. Maier, born June 25, 1925.
