= Joe Wesley =

American football player (born 1976)

No. 50, 56
- Position: Linebacker

Personal information
- Born: November 10, 1976 (age 49); Jackson, Mississippi, U.S.
- Listed height: 6 ft 1 in (1.85 m)
- Listed weight: 232 lb (105 kg)

Career information
- High school: Brookhaven (Brookhaven, Mississippi)
- College: LSU (1995–1998)
- NFL draft: 1999: undrafted

Career history
- San Francisco 49ers (1999–2000); Berlin Thunder (2001); Jacksonville Jaguars (2001–2002); Berlin Thunder (2003); Bossier–Shreveport Battle Wings (2005)

Awards and highlights
- World Bowl champion (IX)

Career NFL statistics
- Games played: 14
- Tackles: 6
- Forced fumbles: 1
- Stats at Pro Football Reference

Joseph D. Wesley (born November 10, 1976) is an American former professional football linebacker who played in the National Football League (NFL) with the San Francisco 49ers and the Jacksonville Jaguars. He played college football for the LSU Tigers. Wesley played with the Berlin Thunder where he won World Bowl IX.

== Early life ==
Wesley was born on November 10, 1976, in Jackson, Mississippi. He attended Brookhaven High School in Brookhaven, Mississippi.

== College career ==
Wesley played college football for the LSU Tigers from 1995 to 1998. He was a four-year letterman. In a blowout win his freshman year against North Texas, Wesley returned an interception 25 yards for a touchdown.

== Professional career ==
=== San Francisco 49ers ===
After going undrafted in the 1999 NFL draft, Wesley signed with the San Francisco 49ers of the National Football League (NFL) as an undrafted free agent. On September 5, 1999, he was released by the team but signed to the practice squad the next day. On September 15, Wesley was promoted to the active roster. On December 8, he was placed on the injured reserve with a knee injury, which ended his season. Wesley played in eight games and made four tackles. On August 27, 2000, he was released by the team.

=== Berlin Thunder (first stint) ===
Wesley was selected in the fourth round, with the 19th overall selection, by the Berlin Thunder in the 2001 NFL Europe free agent draft. He made 45 total tackles, one sack, one interception, two pass deflections, and one forced fumble and won World Bowl IX.

=== Jacksonville Jaguars ===
On July 25, 2001, Wesley signed with the Jacksonville Jaguars. He was waived on September 2. On October 7, Wesley re-signed with the team and made his first appearance that week. He was released on October 11. On October 22, Wesley signed to the practice squad. On November 21, he was released but re-signed on November 28. On December 4, he was activated and played in five more games in the season. Wesley made two tackles and one force fumble on special teams in the infamous Bottlegate game.

=== Berlin Thunder (second stint) ===
In 2003, Wesley was again selected by the Berlin Thunder in the NFL Europe free agent draft. In his only game he played, he started and six tackles.

=== Bossier–Shreveport Battle Wings ===
In 2005, Wesley played one season of arena football with the Bossier–Shreveport Battle Wings of the af2 as a fullback and linebacker.
