= Brookhaven High School =

Brookhaven High School may be:

- Brookhaven High School (Columbus, Ohio)
- Brookhaven High School (Brookhaven, Mississippi)
