= Carl Baermann =

German clarinetist and composer

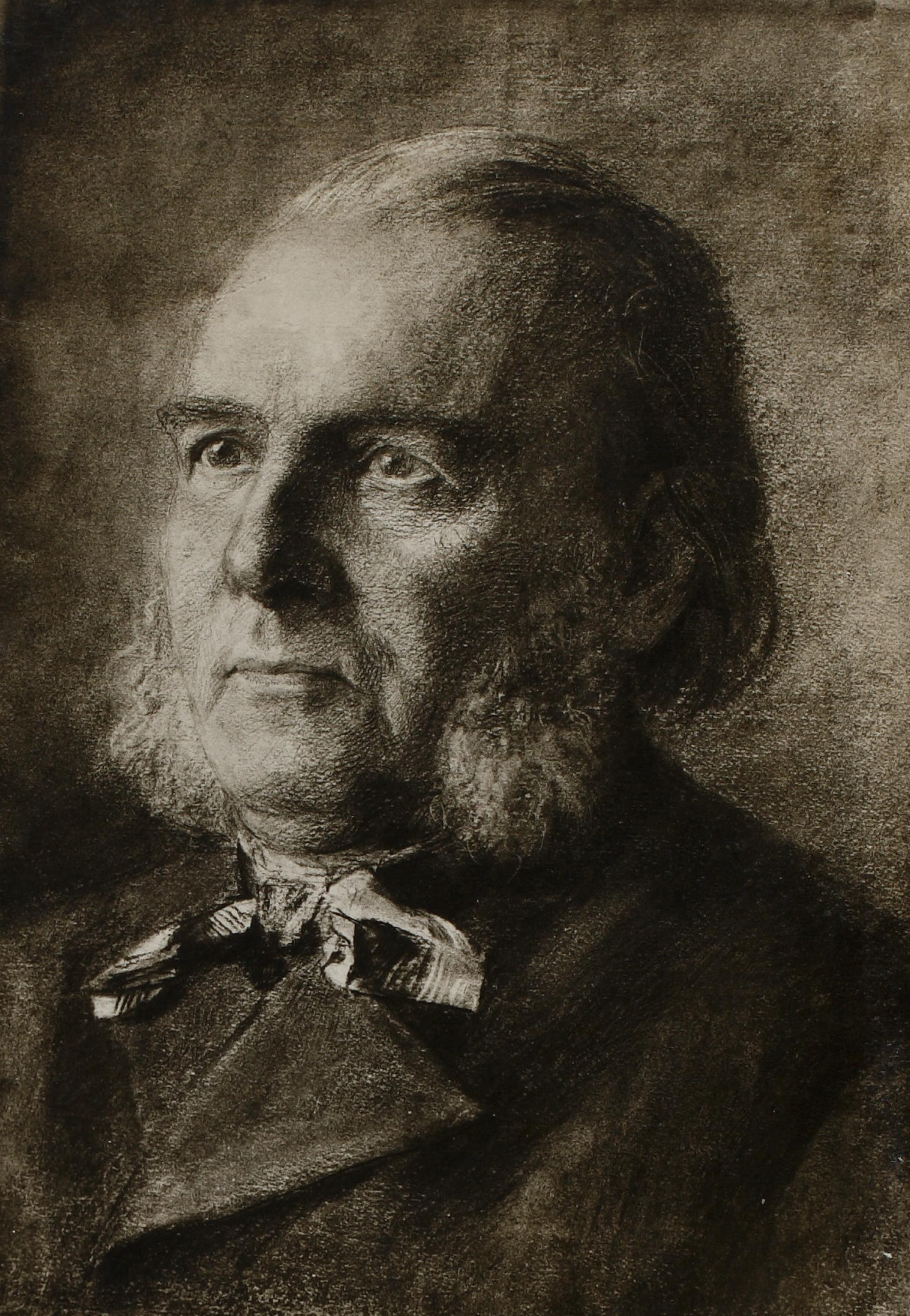
A charcoal drawing of Carl Baermann

Carl Baermann (24 October 1810 – 23 May 1885) was a clarinetist and composer from Munich, Germany. He should not be confused with his son, the pianist and composer Carl Baermann (1839–1913).

== Life and career ==
He was the son of noted clarinet virtuoso Heinrich Baermann and Helene Harlaß. As a child he was taught the clarinet and the basset horn by his father. He played occasionally in the Munich court orchestra when he was 14 years old, and was appointed its second clarinetist in 1832. When his father retired in 1834, Carl succeeded his father as principal clarinetist. He held that position until he retired in 1880.

He toured Europe with his father in 1827, 1832 and 1838. In 1833 they premiered Felix Mendelssohn's Konzert Stücke, Opp. 113 & 114, (Concert Pieces) to great acclaim. Carl Baermann's compositions, 88 opus numbers, were popular with clarinet virtuosos.

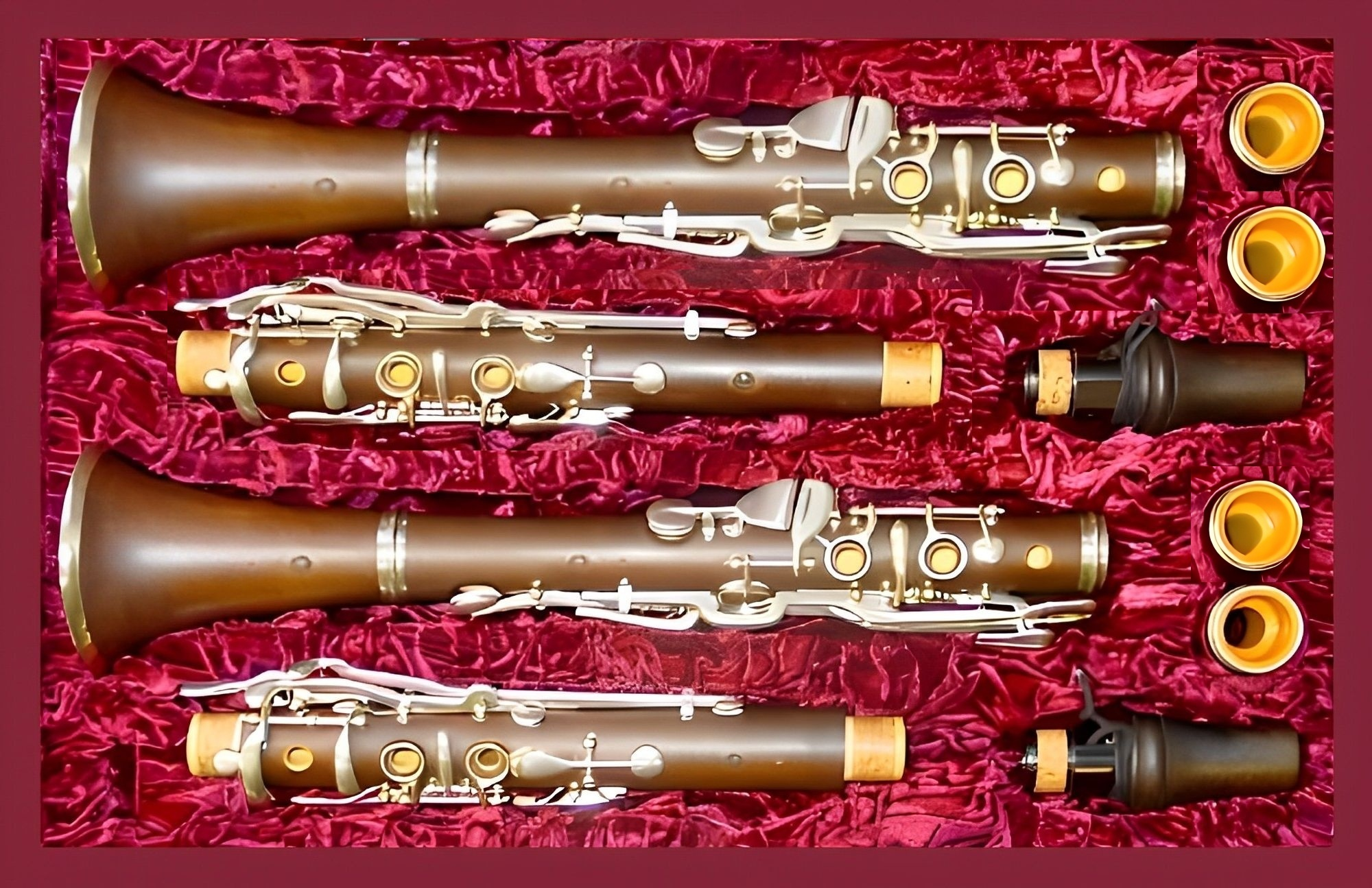
A set of Baermann-Ottensteiner clarinets, replica by Andreas Schöni, Bern, made of brown boxwood

Baermann developed the Baermann-Ottensteiner key system for the clarinet, which was based on the Müller system. The system was very popular during the late 19th century, partly because of Baermann's Vollständige Clarinett-Schule (Complete School for the Clarinet), one of the leading methods for teaching the clarinet, written between 1864 and 1875.

== Compositions ==
- Concerto Militaire for clarinet and orchestra, Op. 6
- Fantaisie brillante for clarinet and piano, Op. 7
- Variations brillantes for clarinet and piano, Op. 8
- La nuit étoilée (Starry Night Fantasy) for clarinet and piano, Op. 13
- Duo Concertant for two clarinets and piano, Op. 33
- Conzertstück, for clarinet and piano/orchestra, Op. 44
- Travestie for clarinet and piano, Op. 45
- Conzertstück No. 1 for clarinet and piano/orchestra, Op. 49
- Vollständige Clarinett-Schule (Complete Clarinet Method) Opp. 63 and 64
1. Historical and Theoretical, Op. 63
2. Preparatory Studies, Op. 63
3. Daily Studies, Op. 63
4. Short Pieces, Op. 64
5. Solos, Op. 64
