= Kidd-Key College =

Former women's college and conservatory in Texas

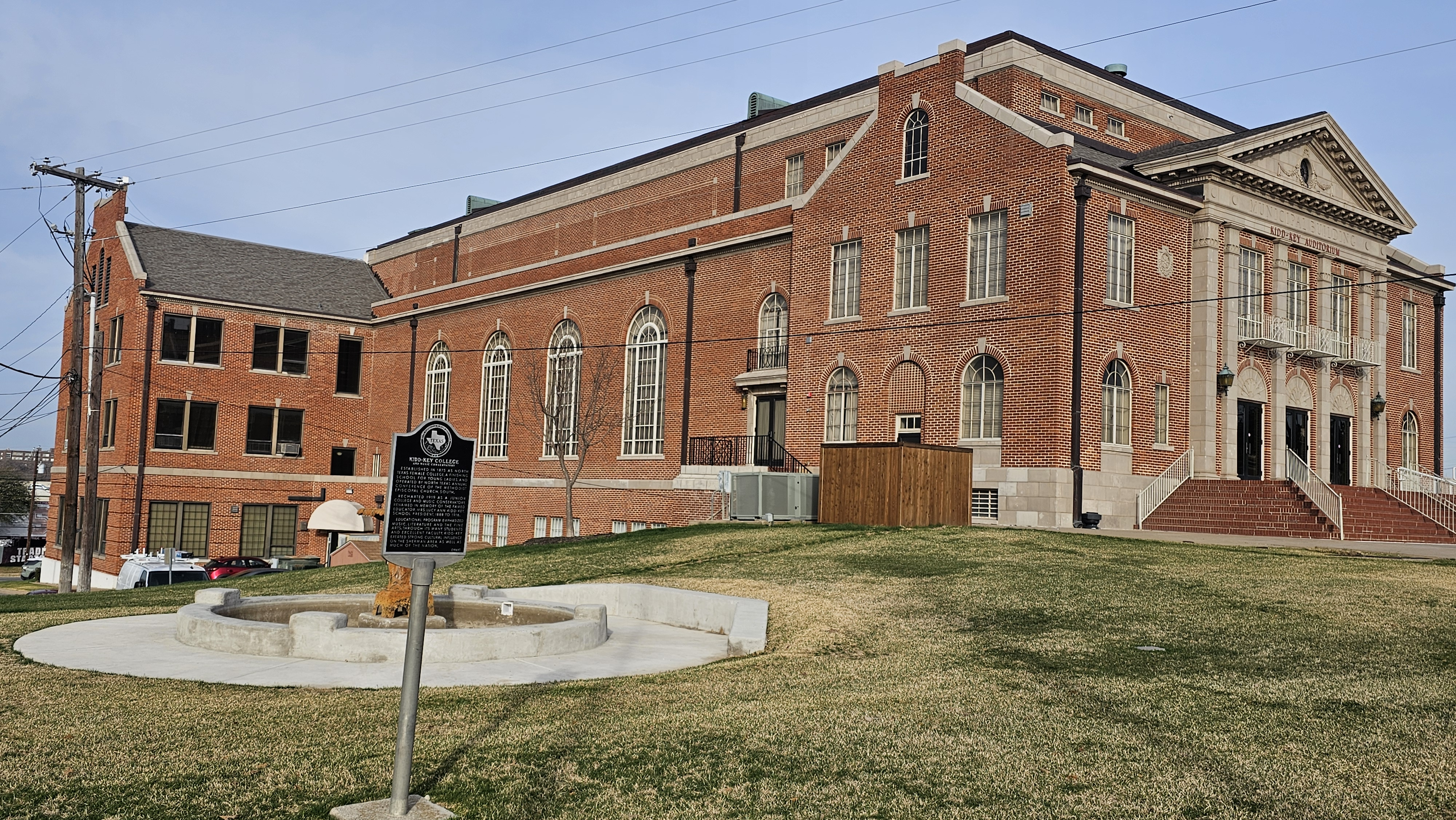
Kidd-Key Auditorium, formerly part of Kidd-Key College and Music Conservatory

Kidd-Key College was a college and music conservatory for women located in Sherman, Texas. The college was established in 1877 as the North Texas Female College, although its origins were in a private high school, the Sherman Male and Female High School. At the time, a college for women was a new idea. In 1901, the college acquired the campus of the Mary Nash College. It changed its name to Kidd-Key in 1919, in memory of its first President, but closed in 1935, largely due to declining enrollment and the effects of the Great Depression.

== History ==
In the 1860s, the Sherman Male and Female High School was opened in rented space in the Odd Fellows Hall. The trustees bought some land and a two-story building was constructed to house the new school. In 1877, the State made a contract with the North Texas Annual Conference of the Methodist Episcopal Church, South, which converted the high school into the North Texas Female College, and the boys who had been in the high school left to attend other schools. The new purpose was for “the support of a female college, a school of fine arts, and a conservatory of music”. Lucy Ann Thornton Kidd, a widowed teacher from Mississippi, was selected to be the president of the College, becoming Lucy Ann Kidd-Key after marrying Bishop Joseph S. Key in 1892.

During Kidd-Key's time as president of the college, the rules were very strict and emphasized the arts while Kidd-Key focused on maintaining the virtue of the women who attended her school. They were only allowed visitors on certain days and at certain times, chaperoned walks, and all students were required to attend church every Sunday. In 1912, the college gained membership into the Founders Club of Southern Methodist University. They had correspondence with SMU and had a genial relationship with them. The president of Kidd-Key College even offered SMU some advice and gave them some pointers on what to expect as a new school. However, the opening of Southern Methodist University in 1915 resulted in a decline of funding from the North Texas Annual Conference of the Methodist Episcopal Church. The enrollment rate began to decline with the loss of funding as well as fewer students being drawn in by the strict rules and regulations in place at the college. Kidd-Key died in 1916 and her son, Edwin Kidd, took her place as president of the college.

In 1919, the name of the college was changed to Kidd-Key College and Conservatory. Due to the decline in enrollment, Edwin Kidd coordinated with the president of Austin College to share facilities and programs. The curriculum at Kidd-Key College was also reduced to a few choice classes to try to preserve the college as much as possible. These efforts worked temporarily, but the campus was eventually closed and liquidated. In 1933, the North Texas Annual Conference of the Methodist Episcopal Church gave full backing to Southern Methodist University and no longer wished to support Kidd-Key College.

In June 1935, after the final class was graduated, the campus closed.. The City of Sherman purchased the campus in 1937 and finished the work on what became known as Kidd-Key Auditorium, which has served as the home of the Sherman Symphony Orchestra since 1966. The only other remaining structures from the college are the Thompson Hall fountain, which was renovated in 2025, and a statue of the Goddess Athena - a gift from the Class of 1899.

== Notable faculty and students ==
Faculty

- Harold von Mickwitz, concert pianist

Students

- Kate Moore Brown, music teacher.
- Wynne Pyle, concert pianist
- Willie Cooper Hobby, First Lady of Texas
