= Esther Cox Todd =

American composer and music educator (1895–1971)

Esther Pauline Cox Todd (March 10, 1895–October 3, 1971) was an American composer, music educator, and organist.

Todd was born in Colfax, Washington, to Horace Mann and Joie Lester Hamer Cox. She married Wesley Sanford Todd on June 29, 1920, and they had one son, Horace.

Todd studied music at Willamette University. She belonged to the Society of Oregon Composers, the Oregon Music Teachers Association, and Phi Beta.

In 1921, Todd worked as the head of the Lewiston State Normal School music department. She later served as dean of the Oregon chapter of the American Guild of Organists and co-directed the Todd School of Music. After her fellow composer Jeanette Tillett died in 1965, Todd promoted and sold Tillett's compositions.

Todd's works were published in professional journals and by Krinke Music Publications Inc. and Willis Music Co. Her publications included:

== Articles ==
- Basic Pieces in the Student's Repertoire (published in The Etude, Feb 1947)
- Why Not Get Up a Summer Music Play (published in The Etude, Mar 1945)

== Chamber ==
- Summer on Larch Mountain (violin and piano)

== Musical Theatre ==
- Hudson's Bay Man (with Jean B. Foster)

== Orchestra ==
- Western Sketches

== Piano ==
- Five Swans
- Frolicsome Friskies (with Harry Krinke)
- Little Red Ski Train
- Salty Sails
- Spanish Whim

== Vocal ==
- Songs
