= Severin Eisenberger =

American musician

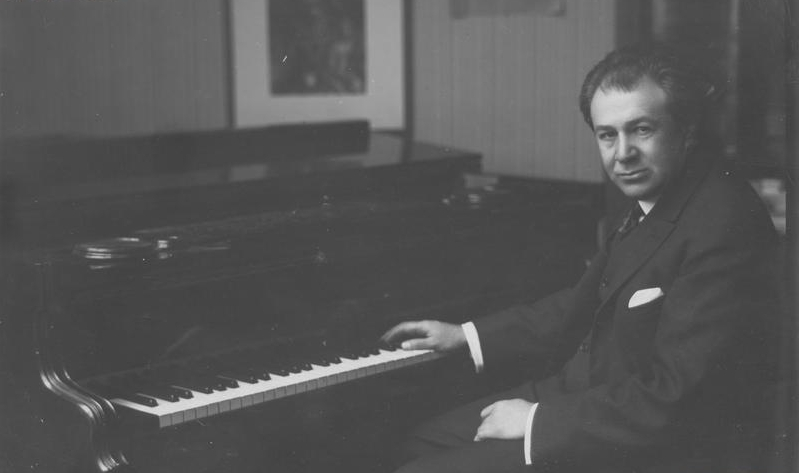
Seweryn Eisenberger

Severin Eisenberger (Polish: Seweryn Eisenberger; 1879 in Krakau, Austrian Galicia – 1945 in New York) was a Polish concert pianist, composer and teacher.

Eisenberger was a student of Heinrich Ehrlich in Berlin and Theodor Leschetizky in Vienna. He made his debut at the age of 10 in Kraków in a performance of Beethoven's Piano Concerto No. 2 in B-flat. After settling in the United States in 1928, he taught at the Cincinnati College Conservatory of Music, and continued to concertize actively. Eisenberger frequently performed with many of the world's leading orchestras, including the Cleveland Orchestra. In 1931 he gave that Orchestra's first performance of Mozart's Piano Concerto No. 24 in C minor, K.491. His concerts included notable cycles of Beethoven's 32 Piano Sonatas. His last public appearance was in 1941 with the Cleveland Orchestra under Artur Rodziński, playing Beethoven's Piano Concerto No. 5 'Emperor'.

Several CD recordings of Eisenberger's playing have been released by Pearl and Arbiter records, including performances of the Grieg Piano Concerto in A minor and the Chopin 2nd Piano Concerto in F minor (recorded c. 1938). Eisenberger was reported to have performed the Grieg concerto under the composer's baton. Allan Evans calls Eisenberger "a distant figure who once was among the commanding keyboard masters to perform throughout Central Europe and the United States."

A number of Eisenberger's pupils achieved distinguished careers as concert pianists, composers and teachers, including Lili Kraus, Heinrich Kaminski, Sylvia Straus Heschel, Herbert Haufrecht, Gertrude Ross, Jeanette Tillett, and Vivien Harvey Slater, his teaching assistant until 1945, who later recorded five LP records of the music of Leschetizky's teacher, Carl Czerny (Musical Heritage Society).

Eisenberger's daughter was Agnes Eisenberger, concert artist manager, and editor of The Brahms Notebooks.
