= George Copeland =

American classical pianist (1882–1971)

George Copeland (April 3, 1882 – June 16, 1971) was an American classical pianist known primarily for his relationship with the French composer Claude Debussy in the early 20th century and his interpretations of modern Spanish piano works.

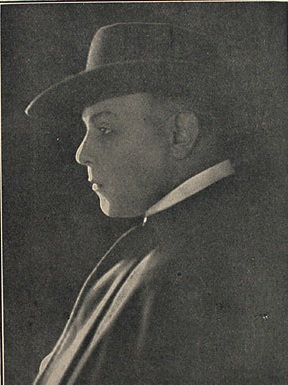
George Copeland ca. 1918

== Education and early career (1882-1903) ==
A native of Massachusetts, George A. Copeland Jr. began piano studies as a child with Calixa Lavallée, a music critic, champion of American music, and prolific composer of children's pedagogical music. Copeland later worked at the New England Conservatory with Carl Baermann.

While still a student in Boston in the late 1890s, Copeland formed a duo with cellist T. Handasyd Cabot (of the Cabot family). Copeland's first performance of a piece by Debussy in January 1904 was a shared recital with Cabot in which they also played the Cello Sonata No. 1 by Brahms. A month after this performance, they appeared as a trio with Karel Ondříček, a concertmaster of the Boston Symphony Orchestra and member of the Kneisel Quartet.

Copeland traveled to Europe to study with Giuseppe Buonamici in Florence. While in Europe, he also studied with Teresa Carreño in Berlin. Copeland returned to the United States in the spring of 1903; a year later, Copeland was coached in either Boston or Paris by the English-American pianist Harold Bauer, concentrating on the works of Robert Schumann. Bauer was considered a Schumann specialist at the time, and would later publish his own edition of the complete piano music of Schumann for G. Schirmer. Copeland only performed two pieces of Schumann on his programs: the Symphonic Studies, Op. 13 and Faschingsschwank aus Wien, Op. 26. The former work was commonly found in his concerts before the 1920s, and he recorded the latter piece in the early 1960s; the recording is available on the Pearl CD "Piano Masters: George Copeland" (PRL 0121).

== Copeland and Spanish music ==
Copeland became an Iberian specialist, performing works of Isaac Albéniz, Manuel de Falla, Enrique Granados, and others throughout the United States and Europe. In 1909, he introduced three of Albéniz's Iberia suite to the United States, playing "El Albaicín," "Malaga", and "Triana" in Boston. He quickly dropped these works from his repertoire, only including "El Polo" from the "Iberia" suite in his programs.

== Copeland and Debussy ==
On January 15, 1904, Copeland gave one of the earliest-known performance of Debussy's piano works in the United States, playing the Deux Arabesques at Steinert Hall in Boston. Copeland was not the first to perform Debussy in the United States; that honor went to Helen Hopekirk, a Scottish pianist who programmed the Deux Arabesques in Boston in 1902. A survey of his programs shows that from the first time he programmed the Deux arabesques, he performed at least one work of Debussy at every recital he played for the remainder of his life.

In 1911, he met Debussy in Paris and spent several months studying with the composer, discussing and playing all of Debussy's piano works. This was a turning point in Copeland's life; until his death 60 years later, Copeland would recall his time with Debussy with the greatest affection and reverence, both in print and in conversation with friends. In 1913, Copeland gave the following account of their discussions:

"I have never heard anyone play the piano in my life who understood the tone of every note as you do," remarked Debussy. "Come again tomorrow." This seemed praise indeed and I did go tomorrow. I found him much more genial than on my first visit, and then I went time after time, until finally I was with him about twice a week for three months. I bought new copies of his works, which he marked for me; I played his works and he criticized my work and showed me what to do and how to do it. In the end, he admitted that I played him just as he wanted to be played and represented to the people.

By 1955, Copeland had modified his account to have Debussy say: "I never dreamed that I would hear my music played like that in my lifetime. In this later version, Copeland claimed that their meetings were daily, for four months, including periods of playing as well as long walks in the countryside.

Copeland gave several U.S. premieres of Debussy's works, as well as a handful of confirmed and likely world premieres. The most important of these latter was the world premiere of numbers X and XI of the Etudes on November 21, 1916, at Aeolian Hall in New York City. The program included Beethoven's Piano Sonata No. 23, Debussy's two piano work En blanc et noir performed with Copeland's student Elizabeth Gordon, and miscellaneous short pieces. The anonymous critic for Musical Courier was not particularly impressed with the Études, writing "Novelties...included two etudes by Debussy. The latter, in themselves, are not so absorbing as some of the composer's more familiar pieces, but as played by Mr. Copeland they acquired a delicate tone and glowing imagery that were surpassingly beautiful." Copeland concluded the recital with his own arrangement of "The Blue Danube". Several weeks later, he repeated the program in Boston. Philip Hale seemed more enthusiastic than his New York counterpart: "The two new pieces by Debussy afforded the pianist an effective opportunity for displaying the vaporous quality of tone, the imagination and finesse for which he is now famous."

Copeland's First Performances of Solo Works of Debussy
Repertoire	Location	Date
Deux arabesques	Steinert Hall, Boston, MA	January 15, 1904
Passepied and Clair de lune (Suite Bergamasque); Prélude (Pour le piano)	Steinert Hall, Boston, MA	April 17, 1906
Nocturne	Steinert Hall, Boston, MA	February 28, 1908
Reflets dans l'eau (Images I); Cortège et air de dance (L'enfat prodigue); Et la lune descend sur le temple qui fut (Images II)	Chickering Hall, Boston, MA	November 24, 1908
Pagodes (Estampes)	Potter Hall, Boston, MA	December 20, 1908
L'isle joyeuse	Potter Hall, Boston, MA	January 17, 1909
Hommage à Rameau (Images I); Poissons d'or (Images II)	Chickering Hall, Boston, MA	February 16, 1909
Suite Bergamasque (complete); Cloches à travers les feuilles (Images II)	Chickering Hall, Boston, MA	April 26, 1909
Le petite berger (Children's Corner Suite); Danse sacrée et danse profane	Chickering Hall, Boston, MA	November 2, 1909
La soirée dans Grenade (Estampes); Des pas sur la neige, Minstrels, Voiles, La sérénade interrompue, La cathédrale engloutie, La danse de Puck (Préludes I)	Jordan Hall, Boston, MA	November 10, 1910
Danseuses de Delphes, Le vent dans la plaines, Les sons et les parfums tournent dans l'air du soir, Les collines d'Anacapri, La fille aux cheveux lin (Préludes I)	Jordan Hall, Boston, MA	February 14, 1911
Bruyères, Ondine, La terrasse des audiences du clair de lune, Brouillards, Les fées sont d'exquises danseuses, Général Lavine - eccentric, La puerta del Vino, Feux d'artifice (Préludes II)	Jordan Hall, Boston, MA	November 13, 1913
La boîte à joujoux	The Fairmont Copley Plaza Hotel, Boston, MA	March 24, 1914 (possible world premiere of piano reduction)
Prélude à l'après-midi d'un faune (arr. Copeland)	Jordan Hall, Boston, MA	January 7, 1915
Berceuse héroïque; Feuilles Mortes (Préludes II)	Jordan Hall, Boston, MA	February 18, 1915 (possible premiere of Berceuse)
Étude 10 pour les sonorités opposées, Étude 11 pour les arpèges composés	Aeolian Hall, New York, NY	November 21, 1916 (world premiere)

== Building a career (1905-1914) ==
Copeland's connection with Debussy and his embrace of French music helped him immensely. A newspaper item from 1909 said that Copeland was "the most expert and sensitive of all the pianists whom Boston ordinarily hears to the music of Debussy, Ravel, and the new French composers in general." In 1908, Copeland and a group of friends formed "The Lekeu Club," a chamber group named after Belgian composer Guillaume Lekeu. The club included T. Handasyd Cabot on cello, violinists Frederick Mahn and Frank Currier, violist Alfred Girtzen, and Copeland. Unfortunately the group was short-lived, performing only from c. February 1908 to April 1909, but they offered intriguing music to the Boston area, including the Piano Quintet by Franck, Piano Trio in A minor by Tchaikovsky, and the Piano Quintet in F minor by Brahms. Chamber works were interspersed with piano solos, always of course including some Debussy.

Copeland made his English debut at Leighton House Museum in 1910 as a supporting artist to French mezzo-soprano Blanche Marchesi. He played a group of solos that included Debussy's "Poissons d'or" and Felix Mendelssohn's Scherzo, Op. 16, No. 2, and also evinced a gift for accompanying, as noted by a reviewer:

"...Mr. Copeland illustrated the possession of a technique as rare as it is welcome to-day among a race of giant pianists too apt to regard the piano as a monster to be subdued rather than as a fairy to be courted. How beautifully such accomplishment as Mr. Copeland's can be employed in the accompaniment of singing is only to be understood by those fortune enough to have heard him accompany Madame Marchesi..."

Early in his career, Copeland often appeared in joint recitals with a number of singers including Evelyn Scotney and Julia Culp.

== Vaudeville and Isadora (1914-1917) ==
In 1914, the vaudeville impresario Benjamin Franklin Keith offered Copeland a lucrative contract to perform in his Boston vaudeville house. Copeland's initial performance was top-billed, with advertising reading "The Celebrated Pianist GEORGE COPELAND In a Brilliant Program." After several years of performing in vaudeville, Copeland believed that the audiences who went to the vaudeville houses were more open-minded than traditional classical audiences, and that playing in vaudeville was beneficial for classical musicians:

I went into vaudeville with the sole aim of giving pleasure, not to educate the masses. I found that the people who frequented vaudeville theatres were much more eager for and appreciative of good music than the average concert audience. They were more appreciative because they came desirous of enjoying, not of finding fault, which is more than I can say of concert audiences. Their instincts were good and fine, and their response to my work immediate and really enthusiastic. The usual recital audience defies you to make good, and comes, with few exceptions, to find out what they don't like. This, obviously, doesn't help the artist or the public. Another thing, one is well paid for one's work, one does not have to depend on eccentricities, a peculiar name, or home-made foreign reputation. The work is a delight from every point of view.

In 1915, he was hired to play for the dancer Isadora Duncan. They performed a series of dances by Chopin at the Century Opera House in New York.

== With the "Isadorables" (1918-1920) ==
From 1918 through 1920, Copeland toured the United States with the Isadora Duncan Dancers (the "Isadorables") a sextet of dancers who were the students and adopted children of dancer Isadora Duncan. Sponsored by the Chickering Piano Company and managed by Loudon Charlton, Copeland and the dancers performed a shared program of dance and piano solos including works of Schubert, Chopin, MacDowell, Debussy, Grovlez, Albéniz, and others. The reviews of Copeland were overwhelmingly positive, though many reviewers were less enthusiastic about the dancers. Annoyed at Copeland's success, the girls ordered Loudon Charlton to put Copeland in his place. The program covers were accordingly changed to read in large font "THE ISADORA DUNCAN DANCERS," with Copeland's name appearing in a smaller font beneath. Copeland saw this and refused to go onstage until all of the offending program covers in the audience had been removed.

During this period, Copeland appeared a number of times in a novel format; he performed recitals in which he would play a piece, and then the Ampico player piano would repeat the same work. At a 1918 Boston recital, he played his transcription of the "Prelude to the Afternoon of a Faun," and then the piano played his piano roll. It was reported that the audience was "most appreciative..." At one concert of this nature in at the Syria Mosque in Pittsburgh in 1920, he performed alongside the pianists Mischa Levitzki, Arthur Rubinstein; all three played and were then followed by their piano roll recordings. The soprano Rosa Ponselle also appeared on that recital, singing to the accompaniment of an Ampico piano.

== Europe (1920-1936) ==
In the spring of 1920, Copeland abruptly broke his contract for unknown reasons and moved to Europe. A 1923 news item in the Musical Courier wrote that Copeland was living and performing in Frankfurt. While living in Italy later in the decade, he accompanied the soprano Nellie Melba in Venice for one of her many "farewell" recitals. According to a contemporary report, Melba and Copeland performed on a "little barge" on one of the grand canals in 1925. Future Metropolitan Opera general manager Herbert Witherspoon said that "The little steamboats puffed and screamed and almost drowned her out." At some point in the late 1920s, he moved to the island of Mallorca. Copeland returned to the United States only periodically, giving Carnegie Hall recitals in 1925, 1928–1931, and 1933. Other performances in Europe during this period included appearances in Vienna with the Vienna Philharmonic, at the Salzburg Festival, and in London.

Copeland occasionally returned to the United States for performances in the 1920s and early 1930s. He performed the music for a Broadway show featuring famed actress Laurette Taylor, Pierrot the Prodigal, which ran for 14 performances at the Actor's Theatre in New York in March 1925. Copeland's performance of the score by André Wormser was described as "enchanting" by Vogue Magazine. In 1931, he performed a joint recital with soprano Frances Alda at Carnegie Hall; she was accompanied by her regular pianist Frank La Forge for the majority of the program, but Alda and Copeland joined forces for a Spanish set at the end.

At the outbreak of the Spanish Civil War in 1936, Copeland returned to the United States.

== Later career (1936-1971) ==
Settling in New York City, he performed regularly at venues including Carnegie Hall, Town Hall, and Hunter College, and made regular trips to Washington D.C. and Boston. Copeland played a Golden Jubilee Recital at Carnegie Hall on October 27, 1957, celebrating the 50th anniversary of his New York recital debut. The New York Times reviewer described his performance as "magical," calling Copeland's work "playing that stays in the memory." He recorded pieces of Debussy for the soundtrack of a now lost film by Muriel Rukeyser, "The Mask." The film featured Sicilian-American mime Salvatore Guida, who acted out a retelling of the Commedia dell'arte Pierrot story. In the spring of 1958, he suffered a fall at his vacation home in Stonington, Connecticut, and broke his shoulder. He was unable to play for several years and believed his career to be over. In 1963, he made a comeback, recording with famed engineer Peter Bartok and concertizing at schools and smaller halls on the East Coast. On May 11, 1964, Copeland performed his final recital at Sprague Memorial Hall, Yale University. Although he spoke in 1966 of a return to the concert stage, he never again performed in public.

== Personal life ==
Copeland was gay, and made little attempt to hide his sexuality. Newspapers described him in a manner that did not hide this fact, the writers seeming to enjoy his brazen behavior. After an interview with the Cleveland Leader, the headline read "Many-Ringed Virtuoso Hates Popularity and Fat." The writer began the article with a vivid description of Copeland:

It was really a most remarkable interview. George Copeland, piano player from Boston, in recital at the Statler last night, removed his dressing gown of purple and gold silk and threw himself back upon his Statler bed, yesterday afternoon. Carefully he smoothed out the wrinkles in his lavender silk pajamas and straightened the silver and lavender stone ring on the baby finger of his left hand. The big ring of remarkable workmanship that almost covered three fingers of his right hand he managed expertly as he inserted a long and slender cigar into a dainty silver-rimmed holder and lit it. His chubby face was amazingly smooth and white, but that was from the powder that followed the morning shave. "You must excuse me," he begged "I am beginning to feel the effects of the epsom salts."

He told the interviewer, "I don't care what people think of my morals. I never think anything about other people's morals. Morals have nothing to do with me." He also indicated that Oscar Wilde was a favorite author.

Copeland's openness about his sexuality allegedly led to problems for composer Aaron Copland. In the 1930s, the pianist had performed on tour in a South American country before the arrival of the composer. In one country George Copeland was apprehended on a "morals charge" and told never to return. When Aaron Copland arrived for his concerts, the authorities treated him frostily before he explained that he was Copland the composer, not Copeland the pianist.

The pianist was a favorite dinner guest of the society columnist Elsa Maxwell, who mentioned Copeland's presence at her own parties in a number of her columns; this included a testimonial dinner given for Fritz Kreisler at which Copeland performed.

== Programming ==
Although his repertoire contained several larger Romantic works, Copeland was alternately acclaimed and reviled as a miniaturist. He devised his programs according to his personal tastes. He said in a 1929 interview, "I don't want to convey any message. I play what I like the way I like it, and the audience generally likes it too. And I don't give a whoop about leaving the world a better place when I die."

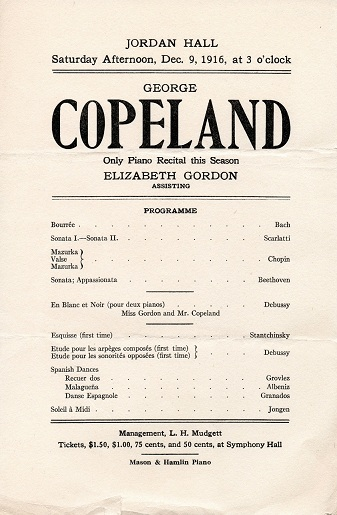
Jordan Hall Recital Program of December 9, 1916

A typical Copeland program included short works of a Baroque composer (Bach, Scarlatti, Grazioli, etc.), works of Chopin (generally a selection of mazurkas, waltzes and etudes), occasionally a larger work of Schumann or Beethoven, Debussy, and modern Spanish works by composers like Albéniz, Granados, Turina, de Falla, Lecuona, and others. He rarely deviated from this formula. He occasionally presented all-Debussy recitals, though more often such recitals included one or two non-Debussy works, such as Rameau or Couperin suites.

At the height of his career, Copeland often presented new works by contemporary composers, few of which stood the test of time. Some of the more esoteric composers featured in his programs: Nicolas Slonimsky, Victor de Sabata, Carl Engel, Gian Francesco Malipiero, Federico Longas, Ramon Zuera, etc. New works generally appeared for a season or two, before he dropped them from his repertoire. Copeland became less adventurous over time, programming with only a handful of less-familiar works, generally in the Spanish group.

His Jordan Hall recital of December 1916, for example, included the Boston premières of several Debussy works, the Beethoven "Appassionata" Sonata, Op. 57, and a work by the Belgian composer Joseph Jongen.

== Critical reception ==
Philip Hale in the Boston Herald (February 14, 1908)

Mr. Copeland has individuality; he has a marked style of his own. This was shown within due bounds in the ensemble, as in the performance of solo pieces. He has an unusually musical touch, clear, sensitive, varied in color. He has a fleetness that he should not abuse; he has strength that is not aggressive or jarring. More than all this, he has true poetic feeling and with it an instinct for differentiation in sentiment. Each one of the solo pieces as he played it was delightful, and his performance of Debussy's Prelude was masterly in all respects.

Henry Taylor Parker in the Boston Evening Transcript (April 27, 1909):

The true player of Debussy's piano pieces...must have an aptitude for them... [...] In Paris, there is such a pianist for Debussy in Ricardo Vines, a Spaniard, and in Boston, there is another in George Copeland. [...] Mr. Copeland commands the light and iridescent quality of tone that they require; he is capable of their flecks and filaments of sound; he can make their harmonies stream when Debussy so wills; or he can fill them with the composer's gleams and sudden lights; or he can spin their delicate arabesques, calling them from the air and seemingly letting them vanish into it. His tone has all the fineness and all the suggestion of color that Debussy asks.

Philip Hale in the Boston Herald (January 8, 1915):

...Mr. Copeland among pianists is as Swinburne said of Coleridge among poets, lonely and incomparable. He belongs to no school; he is no one's disciple. Playing Debussy's music more poetically and fantastically than any pianist we have heard, he yet cannot be called a specialist, for he played last night the music of MacDowell in the epic manner; his performance of Scarlatti's Pastorale, beautiful in every way, had the right touch of archaism; his Schumann was Schumannesque, and his interpretation of Chopin's pieces would surely have won the approval of Vladimir de Pachmann.

No Author, Toledo Times (October 18, 1919):

So great was the throng that crowded to the Woman's Building last night to hear the Copeland piano recital that a conductor on the Cherry street car line was heard to remark: "Thought the McCormack concert was Thursday night."

And worthy to be ranked with the two previous musical events of the week, the brilliant opening concerts of the Civic Music League and the Teacher's Course, was the playing of George Copeland, pianist extraordinare.

The auditorium seating 1200 persons was crowded to capacity before the hour for opening and latecomers willingly stood leaning against the wall during more than an hour's program by this wizard of the keyboard.

Copeland's playing was new to Toledo and it took the audience, in which was represented practically every musician and music fan in the city, by storm. Invited to a complimentary concert by the J.W. Greene Co., although the fame of the artist had been heralded, few were prepared for the masterful interpretations of Copeland.

He seems in a class by himself in his mastery over the instrument. Totally unlike physically the traditional pianist of the long locks and temperamental make-up and producing a first impression of a prosperous business or professional man of the day, the moment the player struck the opening chords, with which he elects to begin each of his numbers by way of preliminary, the cognoscenti knew that an artist had come among them.

And not only musicians but everybody in the audience passed immediately under his spell. A piano recital, the most deadly form of entertainment in the hands of mediocrity, had become for the time a thing of life and joy and personal satisfaction to every listener.

It will be long before Toledo will hear a more perfect rendition of Beethoven's Moonlight Sonata than that with which Copeland opened his program. There followed a Gavotte and Musette by Gluck, two sprightly French dances and then Chopin. It was the Chopin Waltz, Op. 70 no. 3 which was the first number to be repeated by the Ampico, a roll made from Copeland's playing being substituted for the fingers of the pianist.

As an interpreter of the impressionistic Debussy, Copeland betrayed his real greatness. Such limpid, liquid tones, in the Reflections in the Water; such sprightliness in Danse de Puck (Dance of Puck)! At the conclusion of the Debussy group, one number of which was repeated by the Ampico, after responding with bows four times to the insistent applause, the artist, taking the compliment for the composer rather than to himself, played as the single encore of the evening, Debussy's A Night in Granada.

The three Spanish compositions with which the program closed showed the versatility of the pianist and were delightful.

== Recordings ==
Cover photo of a 1944 Copeland Carnegie Hall program

From 1933 to 1940, Copeland recorded a large portion of his repertoire for RCA Victor. The most-represented composer was Debussy, including excerpts from the Preludes, Images, Estampes, Children's Corner and Suite Bergamasque, as well as many Spanish piano works including those of Albéniz, Granados, and de Falla, and more obscure composers like Gustavo Pittaluga, Joaquin Turina, Raoul Laparra and Federico Longas. Copeland's RCA Victor recordings are available on a two-CD Pearl set, "George Copeland – Victor Solo Recordings" (PRL 0001).

In 1937, Copeland recorded a number of songs with well-known Spanish soprano Lucrezia Bori, including works of de Falla, Nin, and Obradors. In the early 1950s, he recorded two discs for MGM Records (all-Debussy and all-Spanish), and in the early 1960s he made private recordings engineered by Peter Bartok and distributed by his agent, Constance Wardle.
