= Thomas Strauthers =

American football player (born 1961)

No. 93, 94
- Position: Defensive end

Personal information
- Born: April 6, 1961 (age 65); Wesson, Mississippi, U.S.
- Listed height: 6 ft 4 in (1.93 m)
- Listed weight: 262 lb (119 kg)

Career information
- High school: Brookhaven (MS)
- College: Jackson State
- NFL draft: 1983: 10th round, 258th overall pick

Career history
- Philadelphia Eagles (1983–1986); Miami Dolphins (1987)*; Atlanta Falcons (1988)*; Detroit Lions (1988); Minnesota Vikings (1989–1991)
- * Offseason or practice squad member only

Career NFL statistics
- Sacks: 17
- Fumble recoveries: 1
- Stats at Pro Football Reference

Thomas Bryan Strauthers (born April 6, 1961) is an American former professional football player who was a defensive lineman in the National Football League (NFL) from 1983 through 1991. He played college football for the Jackson State Tigers. He was selected by the Philadelphia Eagles in the 10th round (258th overall) of the 1983 NFL Draft.
