= Lothar Kempter =

German-Swiss composer and conductor

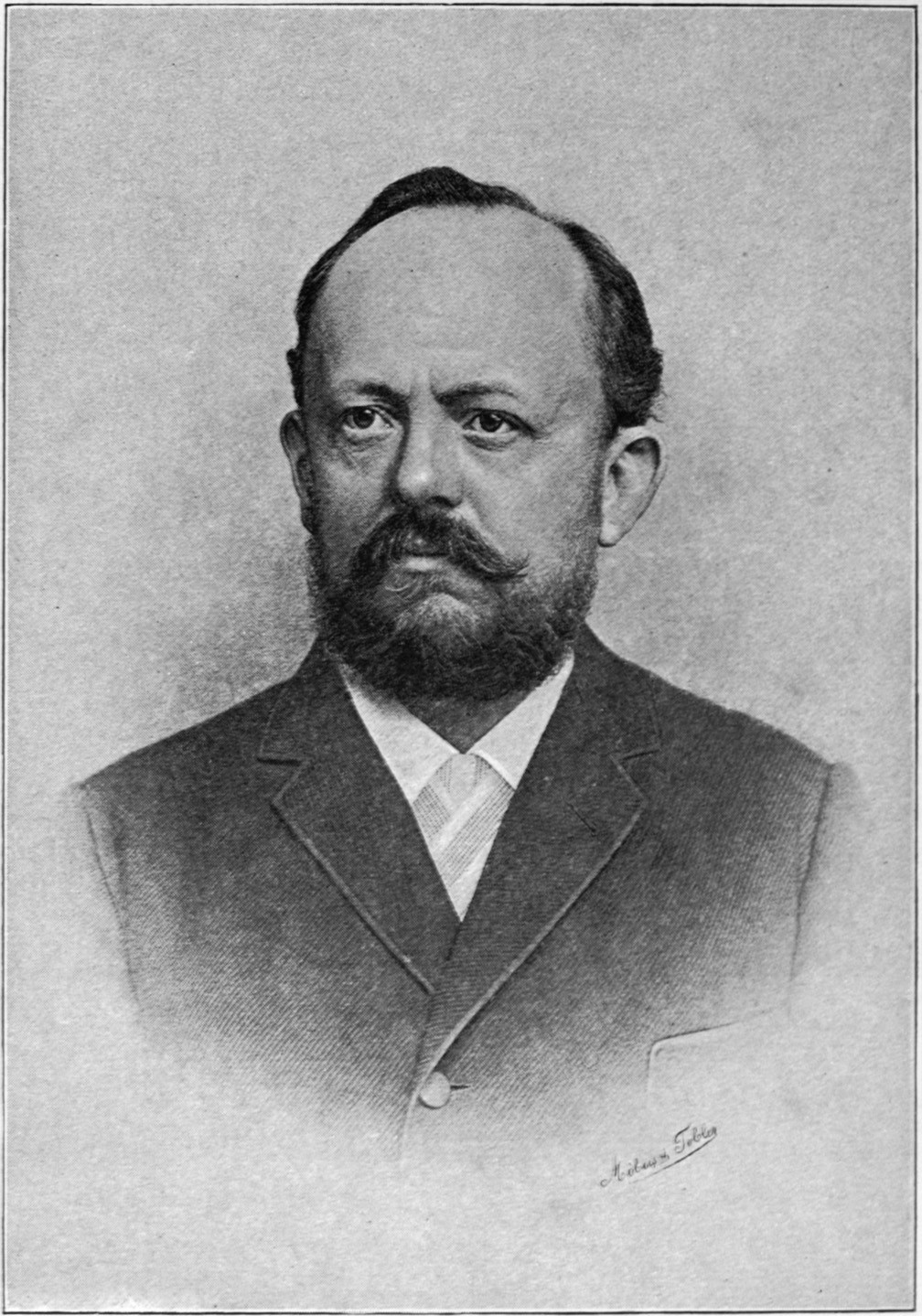
Lothar Kempter.

Lothar Kempter (5 February 1844 – 14 July 1918) was a German-Swiss composer and conductor.

== Biography ==
Kempter was born in 1844 in Lauingen. His father was music teacher Friedrich Kempter. Following his father's wishes he started studying law at the Ludwig-Maximilians-Universität München. In 1868, after his father had died, he changed to studying music. At the Royal Music Academy in Munich he studied Musical ensemble with Hans von Bülow, composition with Josef Rheinberger, choir singing with Franz Wüllner, and piano with Carl Baermann.

In 1871, he moved to Magdeburg, where he became second Kapellmeister of the orchestra of the Stadttheater Magdeburg. The same year he married singer Caroline Leonoff.

He then conducted for three years the orchestra at the Strasbourg theatre. In 1875, he became Kapellmeister at the Aktientheather in Zürich, a position which he held until 1915. In 1879, he became director of the Tonhalle Orchester Zürich.

In 1886, he began teaching music theory and composition at the Zurich Conservatory (merged in 1999 into the School of Music, Drama, and Dance (HMT), itself merged in 2007 into the Zurich University of the Arts (ZHdK)). In 1892, he became a citizen of Zürich.

In 1911, he was awarded an honorary doctorate from the University of Zurich.

In 1899, eleven years after his first wife Caroline had died, he married Hedwig Ratzinger, who died in 1908. In 1910, he married Philomena Jakob (alias Philo Jarno). Both were singers at the Stadttheater Zurich.

He died in Vitznau at the age of 74.
