= Leonard Pennario =

American pianist and composer (1924–2008)

Leonard Pennario (July 9, 1924 – June 27, 2008) was an American classical pianist and composer.

== Life ==
He was born in Buffalo, New York, and grew up in Los Angeles, attending Los Angeles High School. He remained in Los Angeles his entire career. He first came to notice when he performed Edvard Grieg's Piano Concerto at age 12, with the Dallas Symphony Orchestra. The scheduled performer had fallen ill, and Pennario's piano playing had come to the attention of the conductor Eugene Goossens, who recommended him as the soloist after being assured by Pennario that he knew the work. At the age of 12, Pennario made his debut performing Grieg’s Piano Concerto with the Dallas Symphony Orchestra.He was proud of mastering the piece after school without missing any time from class.

He studied with Guy Maier, Olga Steeb, and Isabelle Vengerova and attended the University of Southern California, where he studied composition with Ernst Toch. World War II interrupted his career, and he served in the U.S. Army Air Forces in the China Burma India Theater, where his piano skills were soon realized and served well entertaining troops of the Air Transport Command operation known as "The Hump". He occasionally had to play around keys missing from the keyboards of the pianos at a couple of the more remote bases. He was discharged in 1946 as a staff sergeant and was awarded three Battle Stars. He had, however, made his debut, in uniform, with the New York Philharmonic at Carnegie Hall on November 17, 1943, with Artur Rodziński, playing Liszt's Piano Concerto No. 1.

Shortly after Sergei Rachmaninoff's death, the conductor Dimitri Mitropoulos invited Leonard Pennario to be the soloist at a memorial concert, playing the Second Piano Concerto with the Minneapolis Symphony Orchestra. Pennario became the first pianist after the composer himself to record all four Rachmaninoff piano concertos and the Rhapsody on a Theme of Paganini. His recording of the Rachmaninoff 2nd Concerto was used for the film September Affair (1950), in which Joan Fontaine plays a concert pianist preparing to play the concerto.

Beginning in the 1960s, he played in a renowned trio with the violinist Jascha Heifetz and the cellist Gregor Piatigorsky. Miklós Rózsa wrote a piano concerto for Pennario, and he was the soloist in the first performance, with the Los Angeles Philharmonic and Zubin Mehta.

Pennario recorded over 60 LPs, most of them of composers dating from Chopin and later. He is perhaps best known for championing certain modern composers such as George Gershwin, Rachmaninoff, Rózsa, Louis Moreau Gottschalk, and Sergei Prokofiev. In 1958, he was tied with Walter Gieseking in terms of best-selling classical records involving the piano.

Pennario retired from active performance and recording in the 1990s. He wrote some pieces of his own, such as Midnight on the Cliffs, March of the Lunatics, and a 4-hand arrangement of Chopin's Minute Waltz.

He was inducted into the Buffalo Music Hall of Fame in October 2007.

As well as being well represented in music encyclopedias, he was a Life Master in tournament bridge, and is listed in The Official Encyclopedia of Bridge, most notably winning an Open Pairs event in China in 1991. He was once part of a celebrity foursome with Don Adams, Les Brown and Jack Benny's daughter Joan Benny.

He died of complications from Parkinson's disease on June 27, 2008 at the age of 83, in La Jolla, California.

An authorized biography of Leonard Pennario is currently being written by Buffalo News music critic Mary Kunz Goldman.

== Sources ==
- see Leonard Pennario home page for additional information including complete discography
