= Wynne Pyle =

American pianist

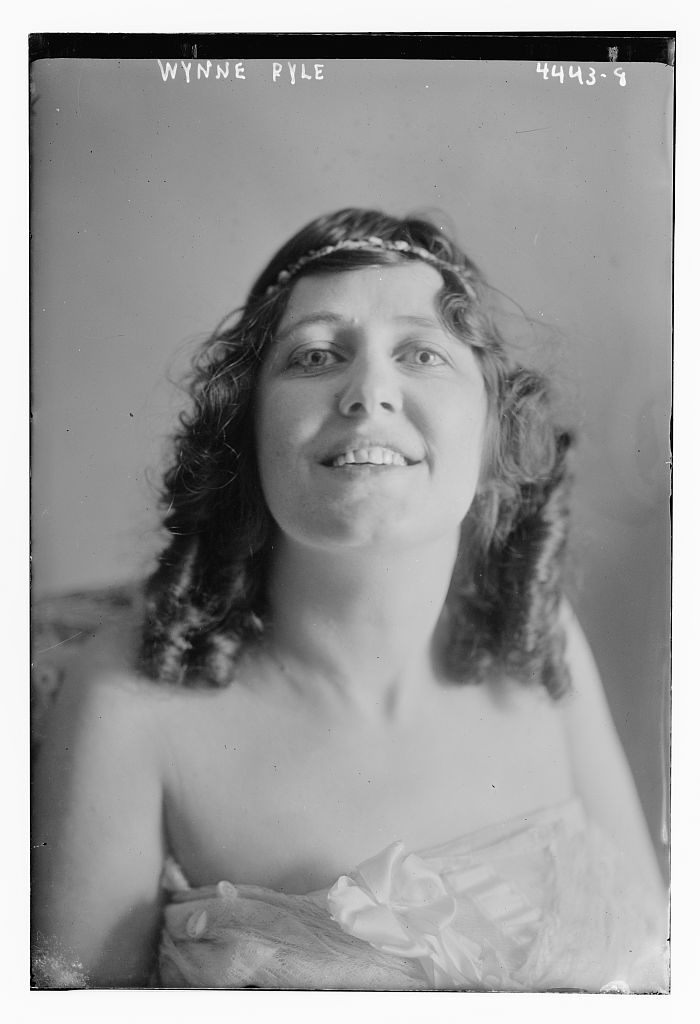
- Wynne Pyle (LOC) (23857103934)
- Born: 24 October 1881; Ladonia, Texas, United States
- Died: 24 April 1971 (aged 89)
- Musical career
- Occupation: Pianist

Wynne Pyle (née Wynne Belle Pyle 24 October 1881 Ladonia, Texas — 24 April 1971 Miami, Florida) was an American concert pianist.

== Early education ==
She studied piano at the North Texas College of Music at Kidd-Key College in Sherman, Texas, under Harold von Mickwitz — the college has no connection to the University of North Texas College of Music. Upon the advice of Mickwitz, she went on to study in Vienna with Theodor Leschetizky. In 1908, she was sent to Paris to study with Harold Bauer; and from there, she went to Berlin where, for five years, where she worked with Albert Jonas.

== Concert career ==
In 1911, she made her Berlin debut with the Blüthner Orchestra. Upon returning to the United States, she made her recital debut in New York on February 17, 1916. Pyle went on to perform as soloist with the New York Philharmonic Orchestra, the New York Symphony Orchestra, the Russian Symphony Orchestra (in New York City), and orchestras of Cincinnati, Minneapolis, St. Louis, and Chicago.

== Rollography ==
The American Piano Company (AMPICO)

- 5294: Rachmaninoff — Fantasy Pieces, Op. 3, No. 5, b-b: Sérénade
- 53073–F: Poldini — Etude Japonaise, Op. 27, No. 2
- 5309: Sauer — Echo de Vienne - Concert Waltz
- 53104–G: Debussy — Prelude, Les Collines d' Anacapri (1917)
- 53274–F: Schumann — Novellette, Op. 21, No. l, E
- 53344–G: Debussy — Préludes, Book I, No. 8: La fille aux cheveux de lin

Philipps Duca Reproduktions-Klaviere Rolles

- PhPD 1000: Liszt — Tarantella from Venezia e Napoli (PhPD = Philipps Duca Reproducing Piano)

Rythmodik Music Corporation

- J–18444: Debussy — Prelude, Les Collines d'Anacapri (1917)

== Family ==
Her only sibling, Lou Netta Pyle (1885 – 1965) was married to Karl Kirksmith (1882 – 1955), a well-known cellist in New York and with several orchestras, including the Cincinnati Symphony Orchestra and the Pittsburgh Symphony Orchestra.

Pyle was briefly married to Ottokar Malek, a famous European pianist who emigrated to the US in 1902-03. They were married on April 9, 1905 in Dallas, Texas, and divorced in October 1906. Malek later founded the Grand Rapids (Michigan) symphony orchestra.

On January 9, 1941, Pyle married her former teacher and colleague Harold Victor Bauer, who, in 1940, had been widowed by his first wife, Maria (née Knapp). They remained together until his death in 1951.

== Additional resources ==
- Library of Congress, Performing Arts Reading Room (Music Division), Harold Bauer Collection
