= Lili Kraus =

Hungarian-born pianist (1905 - 1986)

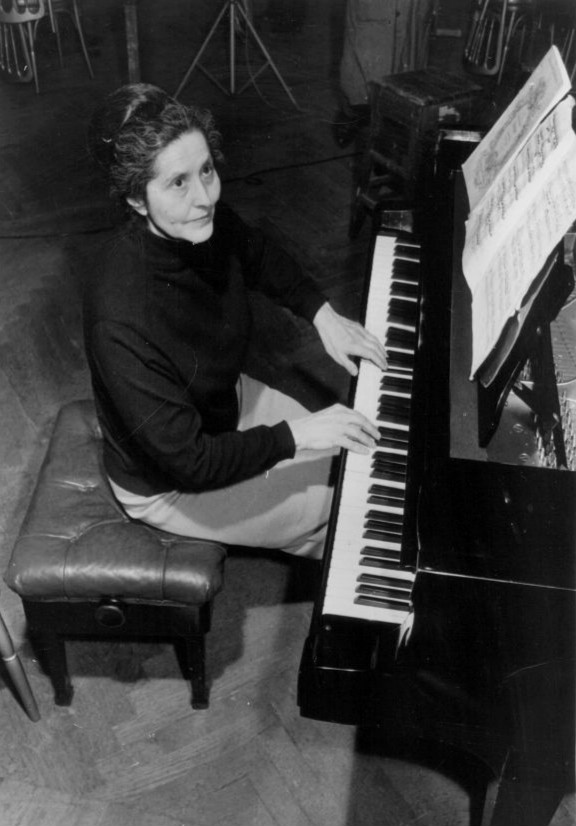
Kraus in 1971.

Lili Kraus (4 March 1905 – 6 November 1986) was a Hungarian-born pianist.

== Biography ==
Lili Kraus was born March 4 in Budapest in 1905. Her father was from Czech Lands, and her mother from an assimilated Jewish Hungarian family.

She enrolled at the Franz Liszt Academy of Music, and at the age of 17 entered the Budapest Conservatory where she studied with Zoltán Kodály, and Béla Bartók. In the 1930s, she continued her studies with Severin Eisenberger, Eduard Steuermann in Vienna and Artur Schnabel in Berlin, who focused her interest in the classical tradition.

Lili Kraus soon became known as a specialist in Haydn, Mozart and Beethoven. Her early chamber music performances and recording with violinist Szymon Goldberg helped gain the critical acclaim that launched her international career. In the 1930s, she toured Europe, Japan, Australia and South Africa. In 1940, Kraus embarked on a tour of Asia where, while in Java, she and her family were captured and interned in a concentration camp by the Japanese from June 1943 until August 1945.

After the war, she settled in New Zealand, where she spent many happy years playing, performing, and teaching. She became a New Zealand citizen and resumed her career, teaching and touring extensively. In the early 1950s she performed the entire Beethoven sonata cycle with violinist Henri Temianka. In 1965 and 1966, she recorded the complete cycle of Mozart's piano concertos with the Vienna Festival Orchestra, under conductor Stephen Simon. From 1967 to 1983, she taught as artist-in-residence at Texas Christian University in Fort Worth.

In 1982 she served on the jury of the Paloma O'Shea Santander International Piano Competition. After that she made her home in Asheville, North Carolina, where she died in 1986.

Kraus's husband was Otto Mandl (1889–1956), a wealthy Jewish (later converted to Catholicism) mining engineer and philosopher. They were married on 31 October 1930 and Mandl sold his business in order to devote himself to the furtherance of Kraus's career. The couple had two children, Ruth and Michael.
