= Alundis Brice =

American gridiron football player and coach (born 1971)

No. 23, 29, 21, 22
- Positions: Cornerback, safety

Personal information
- Born: May 1, 1970 (age 56); Brookhaven, Mississippi, U.S.
- Listed height: 5 ft 10 in (1.78 m)
- Listed weight: 178 lb (81 kg)

Career information
- High school: Brookhaven
- College: Old Miss
- NFL draft: 1995: 4th round, 129th overall pick

Career history

Playing
- Dallas Cowboys (1995–1996); Philadelphia Eagles (1998)*; Milwaukee Mustangs (1998); Tampa Bay Storm (1998); Toronto Argonauts (1999); Saskatchewan Roughriders (2000)
- * Offseason or practice squad member only

Coaching
- University of Idaho (2004–2006) Cornerback coach; Portland State University (2007–2008) Secondary coach

Awards and highlights
- Super Bowl champion (XXX); Chuckie Mullins Courage Award (1994); Second-team All-American (1994); 2× First-team All-SEC (1993, 1994)

Career NFL statistics
- Total tackles: 20
- Interceptions: 1
- Stats at Pro Football Reference
- Stats at ArenaFan.com

Alundis Marcell Brice (born May 1, 1971) is an American former professional football player who was a cornerback in the National Football League (NFL) for the Dallas Cowboys. He was also a member of the Toronto Argonauts and Saskatchewan Roughriders in the Canadian Football League (CFL). He played college football for the Ole Miss Rebels.

== Early life ==
Brice attended Brookhaven High School, where he played as a wide receiver and cornerback. He received Class 5A All-State honors as a senior. He competed in track, winning the state title in the 200 metres.

He accepted a football scholarship from the University of Mississippi. He was originally recruited as a wide receiver, but after he didn't record a single reception as a sophomore even though he played in every game, he was converted into a cornerback.

Brice was named the starter at left cornerback as a junior, developing as a dominant player and a key part in the team leading all NCAA Division I schools in fewest total yards allowed per game (234.5). He had 7 interceptions (second in school history). He also became the second player in school history to return 2 interceptions for touchdowns in a single-season.

As a senior, he changed his jersey number to 38, in honor of Chucky Mullins who was paralyzed in 1989. He started at left cornerback, registering 50 tackles (42 solo), 7 interceptions (4 interceptions in the last 2 games) and 9 passes defensed. At the end of the year he was shot in the chest while breaking up an on-campus altercation, with the bullet nearly hitting his heart. After an 11-day stay in the hospital, he resumed his preparation for the 1995 NFL draft.

He practiced track, posting personal best times of 10.75 seconds (100 metres), 21.62 seconds (200 metres) and 6.22 seconds (55 metres) as a sophomore.

== Professional career ==
=== Dallas Cowboys ===
Brice was selected by the Dallas Cowboys in the fourth round (129th overall) of the 1995 NFL draft, after he dropped because of health concerns. When the team acquired Deion Sanders, Brice was given a BMW car to switch jersey numbers so that Sanders could wear his #21, even though Brice had already stated he had no attachment to the number.

As a rookie, he played on special teams and the nickel defense. He started against the Oakland Raiders in place of Larry Brown, who had missed the week because of a family tragedy. He finished the season with 9 defensive tackles, one interception, 2 passes defensed and 4 special teams tackles.

In 1996, in the second game against the New York Giants, he had a career-high 4 tackles. In the fourteenth game against the Arizona Cardinals, he was making his second career start in place of an injured Sanders, when he suffered a torn anterior cruciate ligament in his right knee. He was placed on the injured reserve list. He collected 11 defensive tackles (one for loss) and one special teams tackle.

In 1997, he suffered a career-threatening injury during his rehab treatment, when his kneecap ruptured into two pieces. He recovered from the injury, but was released to make room for Sanders on August 21.

=== Philadelphia Eagles ===
On April 24, 1998, he signed a one-year contract with the Philadelphia Eagles as a free agent. On August 25, he was released before the start of the season.

=== Milwaukee Mustangs ===
On March 20, 1998, he was signed by the Milwaukee Mustangs of the Arena Football League. He was activated on October 15.

=== Tampa Bay Storm ===
On November 10, 1998, the Tampa Bay Storm selected Brice in the third round of the expansion draft, using a pick they obtained in a trade with the Buffalo Destroyers. He was waived on April 18, 1999.

=== Toronto Argonauts ===
On June 11, 1999, he was signed as a free agent by the Toronto Argonauts of the Canadian Football League, to play free safety. He appeared in 18 games, tallying 35 defensive tackles, 2 fumble recoveries and 2 special teams tackles.

=== Saskatchewan Roughriders ===
On April 20, 2000, he signed with the Saskatchewan Roughriders of the Canadian Football League. He was a backup free safety, appearing in 4 games and making 14 tackles. He wasn't re-signed after the season.

== Personal life ==
In 2002, he began his coaching career as a graduate football assistant at the University of Alabama-Birmingham. In 2003, he was a defensive graduate assistant at the University of Mississippi. In 2004, he was hired as the cornerback assistant coach for the University of Idaho.

From 2007 to 2008, he was the secondary coach at Portland State University. From 2017 to 2019, he was an employment area Director with SL Start, later called Compass Careers Solutions.
