= Harold von Mickwitz =

American concert pianist and composer

Harold von Mickwitz (né Paul Harald von Mickwitz; 22 May 1859 — 12 February 1938) was an American concert pianist and composer who had been head the piano departments of conservatories in Germany and the United States.

== Education ==
Mickwitz was born in Helsinki and studied music at the Saint Petersburg Conservatory from 1870 to 1877, initially studying piano with Louis Brassin and composition with Nikolai Rimsky-Korsakov. He eventually began studying piano with Theodor Leschetizky, who, in 1862, had been one of the founders of the conservatory. In 1877, Leschetizky moved to Vienna. Mickwitz followed him there and continued to study with him for three more years. In 1880, von Mickwitz began concertizing, mostly in Germany.

== Career ==
In 1886, he began teaching piano at the Karlsruhe Conservatory of Music, and from 1893 to 1895, he taught piano at the Wiesbaden Conservatory of Music.

Von Mickwitz immigrated to the United States from Wiesbaden, arriving by ship from Antwerp, Belgium, August 19, 1897. That same year, he was appointed to head the newly established music conservatory at Kidd-Key College in Sherman, Texas. On October 22, 1902, von Mickwitz became a naturalized U.S. citizen during a ceremony in Federal Court in Sherman, Texas. From 1906 to 1908, he was head of the piano department at the Bush Conservatory of Music in Chicago. From 1912 to 1916, he again became head of the piano department at the Bush Conservatory of Music in Chicago. From 1916 to 1918, he was Dean of Music at Southern Methodist University. He left SMU in 1918 to accept a position as a principal piano teacher at the Institute of Musical Art (Juilliard). In 1932, he taught in Helsinki. In 1934, while teaching in Dallas, von Mickwitz accepted an offer to return to Kidd-Key College to replace Frank Pettis Handy Pipes (1877–1933), who had died.

Von Mickwitz died, aged 78, in his native city of Helsinki.

== Notable students ==
Chicago

- Elsie Barge

Germany

- Jeanette Tillett

Kidd-Key College

- Wynne Pyle
- Blanche Haynes Hill
