= Viola Cole-Audet =

American pianist and music educator (1883–1936)

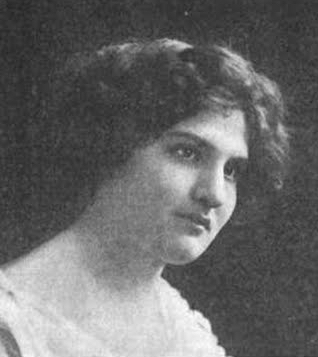
- Cole-Audet, from a 1921 publication
- Born: Viola Cole; 1883; Chicago, Illinois, U.S.
- Died: July 31, 1936 (aged 52–53); Chicago, Illinois, U.S.
- Other name: Viola Cole Audet
- Occupations: Pianist, music educator
- Years active: 1910s–1930s

Viola Cole-Audet (1883 – July 31, 1936) was an American pianist, composer, and music educator, based in Chicago.

== Early life ==
Viola Cole was born in Chicago, Illinois, United States, the daughter of Francis F. Cole and Anna E. Schneider Cole. Her father was born in Belfast. She trained as a pianist with Harold Bauer.

== Career ==
Viola Cole ran her own music school. Later, she was on the faculty of the Chicago Musical College, and especially noted for her skill at teaching piano. Commented one 1922 reviewer, "Mme. Cole-Audet is indeed a student of music and of human nature and she knows not only how music should sound, but also the means by which her pupils can make it do so."

Cole-Audet also gave recitals, composed works for piano and orchestra, and lectures on modern music. Although she was based in Chicago, she performed in New York City in 1917 and 1918, at Aeolian Hall.

== Personal life ==
In 1918, Viola Cole married F. Emile Audet, a Canadian-born lawyer who was a professor of French at DePaul University. Cole-Audet died at a beach in Chicago in summer 1936, in her fifties. Several weeks later, at her brother's request, her body was exhumed to determine whether she was the victim of a homicide. Testing found no evidence of poison in her remains.
