= Ralph Smith (American football) =

American football player (1938–2023)

- Smith while at Ole Miss

No. 85, 41, 81
- Position: End

Personal information
- Born: December 1, 1938; Brookhaven, Mississippi, U.S.
- Died: August 23, 2023 (aged 84); McComb, Mississippi, U.S.
- Listed height: 6 ft 2 in (1.88 m)
- Listed weight: 214 lb (97 kg)

Career information
- High school: University Military School (1954); Brookhaven (1955–1957)
- College: Ole Miss (1958–1961)
- NFL draft: 1962: 8th round, 111th overall pick
- AFL draft: 1962: 12th round, 93rd overall pick

Career history
- Philadelphia Eagles (1962–1965); Cleveland Browns (1965–1968); New Orleans Saints (1969)*; Atlanta Falcons (1969)
- * Offseason or practice squad member only

Awards and highlights
- National champion (1960); Second-team All-American (1961); Second-team All-SEC (1961); Third-team All-SEC (1960)

Career NFL statistics
- Receptions: 41
- Receiving yards: 549
- Total touchdowns: 6
- Stats at Pro Football Reference

Ralph Allon "Catfish" Smith Sr. (December 1, 1938 – August 23, 2023) was an American professional football player who was an end in the National Football League (NFL). He played eight seasons, for the Philadelphia Eagles (1962–1964), Cleveland Browns (1965–1968), and the Atlanta Falcons (1969). He was drafted out of Ole Miss by the Eagles in 1962 and also had a stint with the New Orleans Saints.

== Early life ==
Smith was born on December 1, 1938, in Brookhaven, Mississippi, and grew up there. He first attended the University Military School in Mobile, Alabama, in 1954, before transferring to Brookhaven High School in his hometown, where he would attend from 1955 to 1957. A teammate of Lance Alworth on the football team, he earned 15 letters across four sports (football, basketball, track, baseball).

Smith had many accomplishments at Brookhaven. In football, he helped them win the conference championship in 1955 and 1957, earning all-conference, All-Southern and All-American honors in all three seasons while being invited to several all-star games as a senior. He also was three times named all-conference in basketball, helped them win the conference basketball championship in 1955, and helped the track team win the state championship in 1957.

== College career ==
Smith began attending the University of Mississippi (Ole Miss) in 1958 and played on the freshman football team that year. He made the varsity team in 1959 and went on to play through 1961 as a two-way end. He contributed to their back-to-back national championships in 1959 and 1960 and overall the team went 29–3–1 with him on the roster. Ole Miss made a bowl game every year Smith was on the roster and he earned All-SEC honors in his final two years, being a third-team selection in 1960 and a second-team choice in 1961. As a senior in 1961, he led the team in both receiving and tackles for loss while being named second-team All-American.

Smith received the nickname "Catfish" at Ole Miss, being likened to Vernon "Catfish" Smith who played at Georgia.

== Professional career ==
Smith was selected in both the 1962 AFL draft by the San Diego Chargers (12th round, 93rd overall) and the 1962 NFL draft by the Philadelphia Eagles (8th round, 111th overall), ultimately choosing to play for the Eagles. He appeared in 13 games, none as a starter, in his rookie season, recording one reception for 29 yards along with one rush for 13 yards. He played all 14 games, four as a starter, in 1963 before playing 11 games, two as a starter, for the team in 1964. He caught five passes for 63 yards and a touchdown in 1963 and then had four for 35 yards the following season. He was released by the team as part of roster cuts in 1965.

Smith joined the Cleveland Browns after being released by Philadelphia. He went on to play four years for the Browns, appearing in every game during that span while starting 29 of his 56 appearances. He caught 13 passes for 183 yards with three touchdowns in 1966 and had a career-best 14 catches for 211 yards the following year, scoring two touchdowns in that season (one receiving, one on a fumble return). He was released following the 1968 season.

After leaving the Browns, Smith signed with the New Orleans Saints. He did not make the final roster. He was signed off waivers by the Atlanta Falcons after failing to make the Saints. Smith played in all 14 games as a backup for Atlanta before retiring after the season. He finished his NFL career having played 108 games, 25 of which he started, and recorded six touchdowns (five receiving, one fumble return) with 41 receptions for 549 yards.

== Later life and death ==
Smith started and operated a barbecue restaurant called "Skinny's" after his football career. He was inducted into the Mississippi Sports Hall of Fame in 2002. He died on August 23, 2023, in McComb, Mississippi, at age 84.
