= Jeanette Tillett =

Jeanette Laura Tillett (August 8, 1888 – July 22, 1965) was an American composer and music educator based in Texas.

Tillett was born in Abilene to Henry Augustus and Mary Benjamin Smith Tillett. Her father was an attorney who represented his district in the Texas Senate. Her birth name was "Nettie," which she later changed to "Jeanette."

Tillett studied piano with Harold von Mickwitz and Severin Eisenberger. She founded and managed the Fort Worth Conservatory of Music, and also taught at Texas Christian University. She belonged to Mu Phi Epsilon. In 1932, she was a founding member of the Fort Worth Music Teachers Association, serving as its president in 1954–55.

Tillett's fellow composer Esther Cox Todd promoted and sold Tillett's music after her death in 1965. Tillett's compositions were published by Belwin Inc. and Willis Music Co. They included:

== Chamber pieces ==
- "Blue Bonnets of Texas" (piano, violin & voice)

== Piano pieces ==
- Sonata No. 1 in C Major
- Teen Topics Sonatina
- Three Western Sketches
