= Eleanor Spencer (pianist) =

American concert pianist (1890–1973)

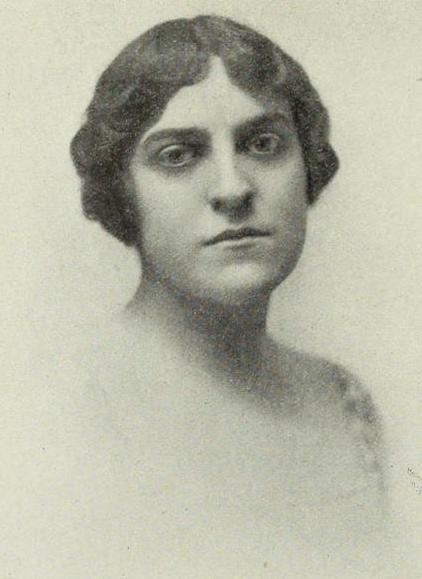
- Eleanor Spencer, from a 1914 publication
- Born: November 30, 1890; Chicago
- Died: October 12, 1973; Locarno
- Occupation: Pianist

Eleanor Spencer (November 30, 1890 – October 12, 1973) was an American concert pianist.

== Early life ==
Eleanor Spencer was born in Chicago. She studied piano there, was soon identified as a child musical prodigy, and started performing at age 10. At age 14 she went to Europe to continue her musical education in Paris, Vienna, and Berlin, studying with Harold Bauer and Theodor Leschetizky.

== Career ==
Spencer gave her first professional recital in London at Bechstein Hall in 1910. In 1912, while living in Berlin with a Russian princess, she made news as a passenger in a "Wright machine" airplane in Germany with pilot Vsevolod Abramovich.

She made her American professional debut at Carnegie Hall in 1913. She lived in Berlin and Paris, and performed mostly in Europe until the beginning of World War II. In August 1919, she was a soloist at the Kurhaus Concerts in Scheveningen, and was described as the first American musician to appear on Dutch concert programs after World War I. She played at New York's Town Hall venue in 1930 and 1936. She also taught piano.

Her critical reception was generally positive. Spencer was considered technically strong, and an expert on the works of Robert Schumann. She played at Aeolian Hall in 1919, displaying her "original taste and ample technique". Of her 1930 performance at Carnegie Hall, the New York Times critic noted "a general effect of monotony in the lengthy movements of the Brahms and Schumann works", and cited a "prevailing lack of imagination" as the cause.

By the time she moved back to the United States in the late 1930s, she was becoming deaf. She retrained herself as a deaf musician, and returned to a performing career after the war. In 1946, she played again in New York, introduced by Edwine Behre.

== Personal life ==
Spencer died in Locarno, Switzerland, in 1973 aged 81 years (her obituary in The New York Times gave her age as 84 years). Her papers, including diaries, letters, and promotional materials, are in the New York Public Library.
