= Lee Pattison =

American musician (1890–1966)

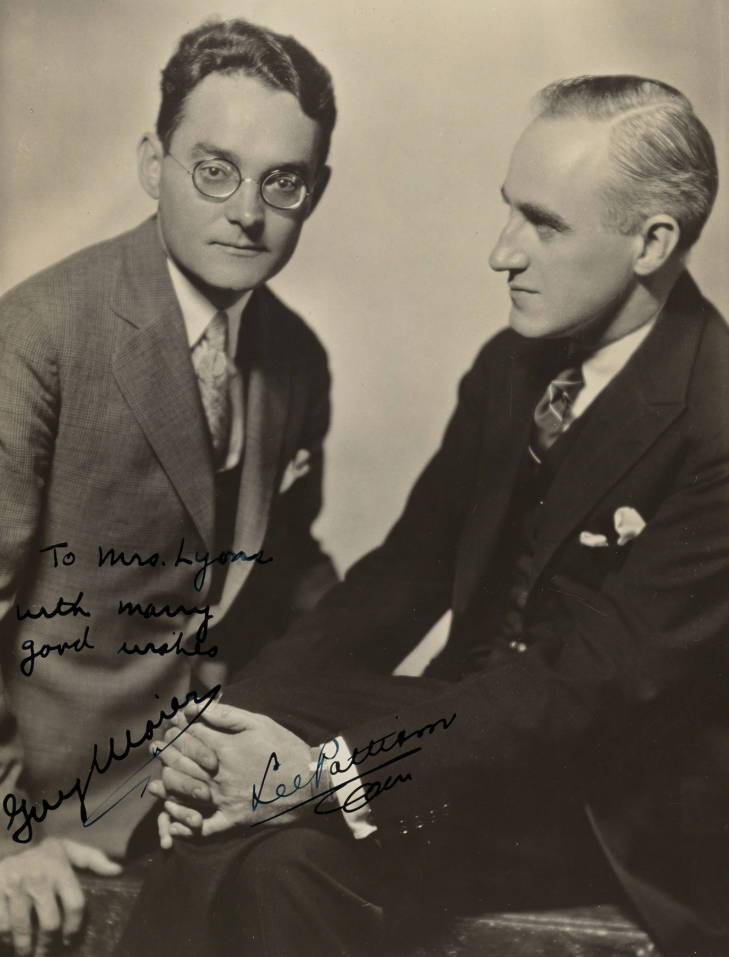
Guy Maier (left) and Lee Pattison (right) in 1928.

Lee Pattison (July 22, 1890, in Grand Rapids, Wisconsin – December 22, 1966, in Claremont, California) was a noted American pianist, composer, arranger, opera director, and teacher. From about 1919 until 1931 he was a member of the popular two-piano team of Guy Maier and Lee Pattison. Lee Pattison Recital Hall at Scripps College in Claremont, California, is named for him.

== Early life ==
Lee (Marion) Pattison was born in Grand Rapids, Wisconsin, on July 22, 1890. His father, Joseph Marion Pattison, was a public school teacher, and his mother, Mary Alice McVicker, a private music teacher. While he was still a boy, his family moved to Iowa. He studied piano and composition at the New England Conservatory of Music in Boston, where his principal piano teacher was Carl Baermann (1839–1913), a friend and pupil of Franz Liszt. Following graduation in 1910, he became a member of the New England faculty. Pattison met Guy Maier, who was then a student at the New England Conservatory. Following Maier’s graduation in 1913, Maier and Pattison left together for Europe, where they hoped to become pupils of Harold Bauer (1873–1951), Josef Hofmann (1876–1957), or Artur Schnabel (1882–1951), all eminent pianists of the time. They found that Bauer was away and Hofmann took no pupils, but Schnabel was willing to teach them. So they went to Berlin, where Schnabel coached them for about a year. Maier and Pattison returned to Boston in 1914.

== Maier and Pattison ==
After Maier and Pattison heard a two-piano performance by Harold Bauer (1873–1951) and Ossip Gabrilowitsch (1878–1936), they began to play together. When the United States entered World War I, Pattison joined the infantry, and Maier volunteered for the entertainment service of the YMCA. In France, the two gave recitals for American troops. After the armistice, they gave a recital in Paris that was attended by President Woodrow Wilson and French Premier Georges Clemenceau. Playing classic works from the two-piano repertory in addition to their own arrangements of the works of great composers, Maier and Pattison traveled widely through the United States and Europe during the 1920s. In 1922, they joined Leopold Godowsky (1870–1938) in the final number of a concert in Carnegie Hall, where they played Godowsky’s three-piano contrapuntal paraphrase of Carl Maria von Weber's Invitation to the Dance. Godowsky dedicated the work to Maier and Pattison. In 1928, they gave the Carnegie Hall premiere of Mozart’s Andante and Variations, K. 501, a work composed in 1786 but never before played in the New York hall. As their reputation grew, they became known as “The Piano Twins.” In 1931, they announced a “friendly split” and embarked on a farewell tour of the United States. Time magazine said they were “as difficult to dissociate as Rosencrantz & Guildenstern, liver & bacon or the Cherry Sisters.” Both were “excellent musicians,” Time said, but Maier was “the better showman. . . Pattison’s contribution is just as important but he makes it more quietly, focuses more on his piano.”

== Later concert career ==
In the early 1930s, Pattison performed as a soloist and also with the eminent violinist Jacques Gordon (1897–1948) and his Gordon String Quartet. In March 1937, Maier and Pattison joined in a reunion concert on the stage of the Works Progress Administration Theatre of Music in New York.

== Original compositions and arrangements ==
Pattison published original compositions and arrangements of classic works for piano, two pianos, solo voice, and choral groups. He spent several summers in composition at Warm Springs, Georgia. He also taught at Sarah Lawrence College and Columbia University.

=== Published compositions and arrangements ===
- The Arkansaw Traveller: Old Fiddler's Tune (Freely Set), for 2 pianos (G. Schirmer, 1925)
- Two Songs, for high voice and piano (G. Schirmer, 1926)
- Two Florentine Sketches, for piano (G. Schirmer, 1928)
- Modest Mussorgsky - Coronation Scene from "Boris Godunov", arrangement for 2 pianos (G. Schirmer, 1928)
- Told in the Hills: Seven Pieces for Piano, Op. 4, for piano (Arthur P. Schmidt, 1929)
- Intermezzo, for piano (Bendix Publishing, 1929)
- Gavotte Mignon, for piano (Bendix Publishing, 1930)
- Seven Pieces for Young Musicians, for piano (Clayton F. Summy, 1942)
- A Babe is Born: Epiphany Carol, for women's chorus (Lawson-Gould, 1956)
- Christ is Risen from the Dead: Motet, for bass solo, mixed chorus and piano (Lawson-Gould, 1958)
- Mistletoe: A Christmas Madrigal, for mixed chorus (Lawson-Gould, 1958)
- Prelude, for piano (Composers' Press, 1963)

== WPA ==
In 1935, he became Regional Director of the Federal Music Project of the WPA in New York.

== American Lyric Theatre and Metropolitan Opera ==
He was also General Director of the American Lyric Theatre in New York. He served as manager of the spring 1937 season of the Metropolitan Opera.

== Scripps College ==
In 1941 he became professor of music at Scripps College in Claremont, California. He held the position until his retirement in 1962, at which time he became professor emeritus. As evidence of the affection and respect in which he was held at Scripps, the trustees named the Lee Pattison Recital Hall in his honor.

== Private teaching ==
Pattison was a highly admired private teacher of piano. His pupils included the eminent pianist, John Browning (1933–2003).

== Family life ==
Lee Pattison married the English-born Gladys Cousins on July 6, 1920. They were the parents of three daughters, Diana (1922–2011), Patricia (1924–27), and Valerie (1930–77).
