= Lucy Ann Kidd-Key =

American educator (1839–1916)

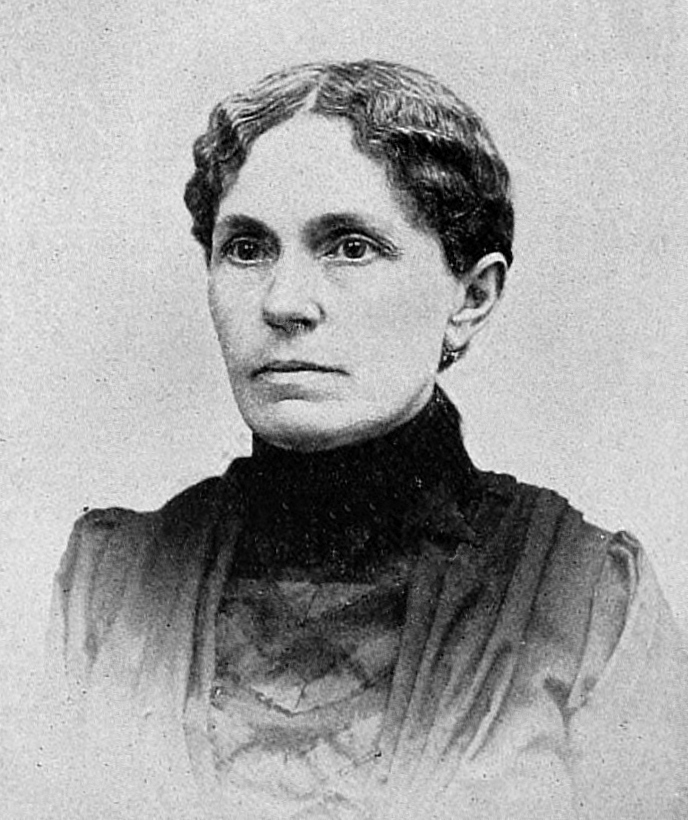
Lucy Ann Kidd

Lucy Ann Kidd–Key (née Lucy Ann Thornton; at first marriage, Lucy Ann Kidd; November 15, 1839 – September 13, 1916) was an American educator and music college administrator from the U.S. state of Kentucky. She founded and served as first president of the North Texas Female College (renamed Kidd-Key College), of Sherman, Texas, the first woman south of the Mason–Dixon line to hold such a position.

== Early years and education ==
Lucy Ann Thornton was born at Bardstown, Kentucky, November 15, 1839 (another source states June 11, 1839), daughter of Willis Strather and Esther (Stevens) Thornton; granddaughter of James Thornton, of Kentucky, and great-granddaughter of Sir William Thornton, of Virginia. On the maternal side she was of South Carolina Huguenot ancestry. There was a sister, Sarah (born 1836), who married Dr. W. Y. Gadberry.

For the most part, her education was acquired at Rev. Stuart Robinson's Institute at Georgetown, Kentucky, where she specialized in literature and history.

== Career ==
About 1858, at age 17, she married Dr. Henry Byrd Kidd (1821–1877) of Kentucky, a physician-planter, and took up her residence on an extensive plantation near Yazoo City, Mississippi. Her sister and brother-in-law moved to Yazoo as well. The American Civil War brought ruin and disaster to her husband. At his death in 1877, after a long period of invalidism, he left many debts, and three small children. She took up the management of the debts, and eventually paid them off.

She accepted the position of presiding teacher at Whitworth College (now Whitworth University), Brookhaven, Mississippi, and remained there 10 years. In 1888, she became president of the North Texas Female College (now Kidd-Key College), Sherman, Texas. This institution had fallen into disrepute, and had been closed for two years. The buildings were in a dilapidated condition, and but partly finished. With a valuation on the property of US$15,000 it was encumbered with a debt of US$11,000. She reopened the college with 60 boarders and an enrollment of nearly 100 students.

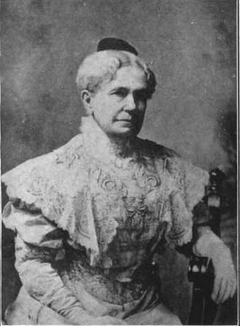
Lucy Ann Kidd–Key

She was married in 1894, to Bishop Joseph Staunton Key (1829–1916), of the Methodist Episcopal Church. In 1908, she organized the Kidd-Key Conservatory of Music and Art, of which she became the president, and brought some of the best teachers available. The college graduated thousands of southern women.

Kidd-Key died at Sherman, September 13, 1916, survived by her second husband. Two children by the first union also survived her: Sara, who married Louis Verse, of Sherman, and Edwin Kidd, an educator of Sherman.
