= Elsie Barge =

American pianist (1898–1962)

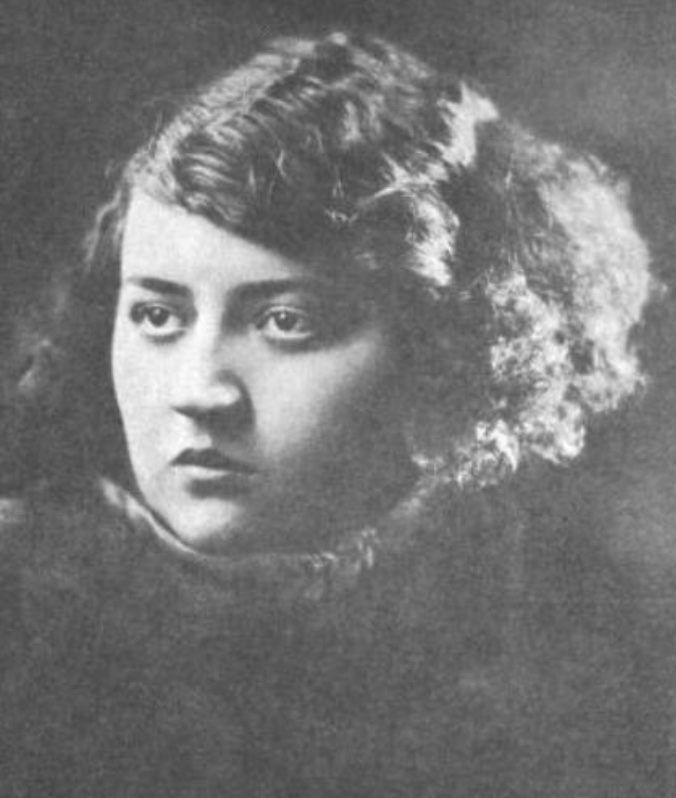
- Elsie Barge, from a 1922 publication
- Born: Elsie Thomas Barge; October 12, 1898; Cordele, Georgia, USA
- Died: December 16, 1962 (aged 64); Jackson, Mississippi
- Other names: Elsie Barge Wilson, Elsie Barge Hennington
- Occupations: Pianist, music educator, clubwoman

Elsie Barge (October 12, 1898 – December 16, 1962) was an American pianist, music educator, and clubwoman.

== Early life ==
Elsie Thomas Barge was born in Cordele, Georgia and raised in Brookhaven, Mississippi, the daughter of Thomas Cicero Barge and Laura Douglas Wilkins Barge. Her father was a businessman. Both of her parents were from Georgia. Her grandfather James Madison Barge was a Confederate States Army veteran of the American Civil War. As a young woman, she performed with her younger sister Frances, a violinist.

Barge graduated from Brookhaven High School in 1914. She studied piano with Theodor Bohlmann of the Cincinnati Conservatory of Music, and with Harold von Mickwitz and Rudolph Ganz in Chicago.

== Career ==
Barge was a concert pianist and performed with the Cincinnati Symphony Orchestra under Eugène Ysaÿe. She accompanied singers including Frances Ingram. She was a piano teacher at the Chicago Musical College, and at Stuart Hall in Virginia. She ran a music school, was a Baptist church music director, and arranged and performed in musical programs in St. Petersburg, Florida, from 1928 into the 1930s.

Later in life, Barge taught music in the schools of Brookhaven. She was also a speaker for the Mississippi Agricultural and Industrial Board. She organized the Fine Artists Series in Brookhaven, and founded the town's music club. She was active in the Mississippi Federation of Business and Professional Women's Clubs, and the Mississippi Federation of Music Clubs. A scholarship to attend the latter federation's Transylvania Music Camp was named for Barge.

== Personal life ==
Elsie Barge married twice, first to Scottish-born Chicago press agent Gardner Frederick Wilson in 1925. They had a daughter, Patrycia (1926–2000). She married again to chiropractor Morris Cook Hennington Sr. Elsie Barge Hennington died in 1962, aged 64 years, at a hospital in Jackson, Mississippi.
