= Brookhaven High School (Brookhaven, Mississippi) =

Highschool in Brookhaven, Mississippi

Location
- 443 East Monticello Street; Brookhaven, (Lincoln County), Mississippi 39601; United States; 31.5788°N 90.4368°W

Information
- Type: Public high school
- Principal: Shonique McLaurin
- Staff: 54.94 (FTE)
- Enrollment: 806 (2023-2024)
- Student to teacher ratio: 14.67
- Colors: Navy and red
- Mascot: Panthers
- Nickname: "Ole Brook"

Brookhaven High School is in Brookhaven, Mississippi. It is part of the Brookhaven School District. All of the students are categorized as economically disadvantaged. The student body is about 2/3 African American and 1/3 white. Classes are fairly segregated and the district allows a parental choice plan for parents to choose their teachers. The school district is under a 1970 desegregation order.

Panthers are the school mascot and the school colors are red and blue. It has a football team.

In 1900 G. L. Teat served as principal of Brookhaven City School. B. T. Schumpert was the principal in 1912. C. H. Lipsey also served as principal. A middle school in Brookhaven is named for him.

Black families boycotted local white-owned businesses after the school moved to hire as athletic director and football coach Hollis Rutter who had worked at a segregation academia.

Supporters of the parental choice plan argue it keeps white families in the district's public schools. Lawrence County Academy was a segregation academy in the area after desegregation and Brookhaven Academy is a current one. U.S. Senator Cindy Hyde-Smith attended Lawrence County Academy and sent her daughter to Brookhaven Academy.

== Notable alumni ==
- Lance Alworth
- Elsie Barge, musician, class of 1914
- Thomas Pickens Brady, white supremacist and segregationist who served on the Mississippi Supreme Court
- Alundis Brice, athlete who competed in track and field and football
- Don Estes, NFL player (San Diego Chargers)
- Ralph Smith
- Thomas Strauthers, former NFL defensive end
- Thomas Terrell, basketball player
- Glen Whisby
