= Carl Baermann (pianist) =

German-American pianist and composer (1839-1913)

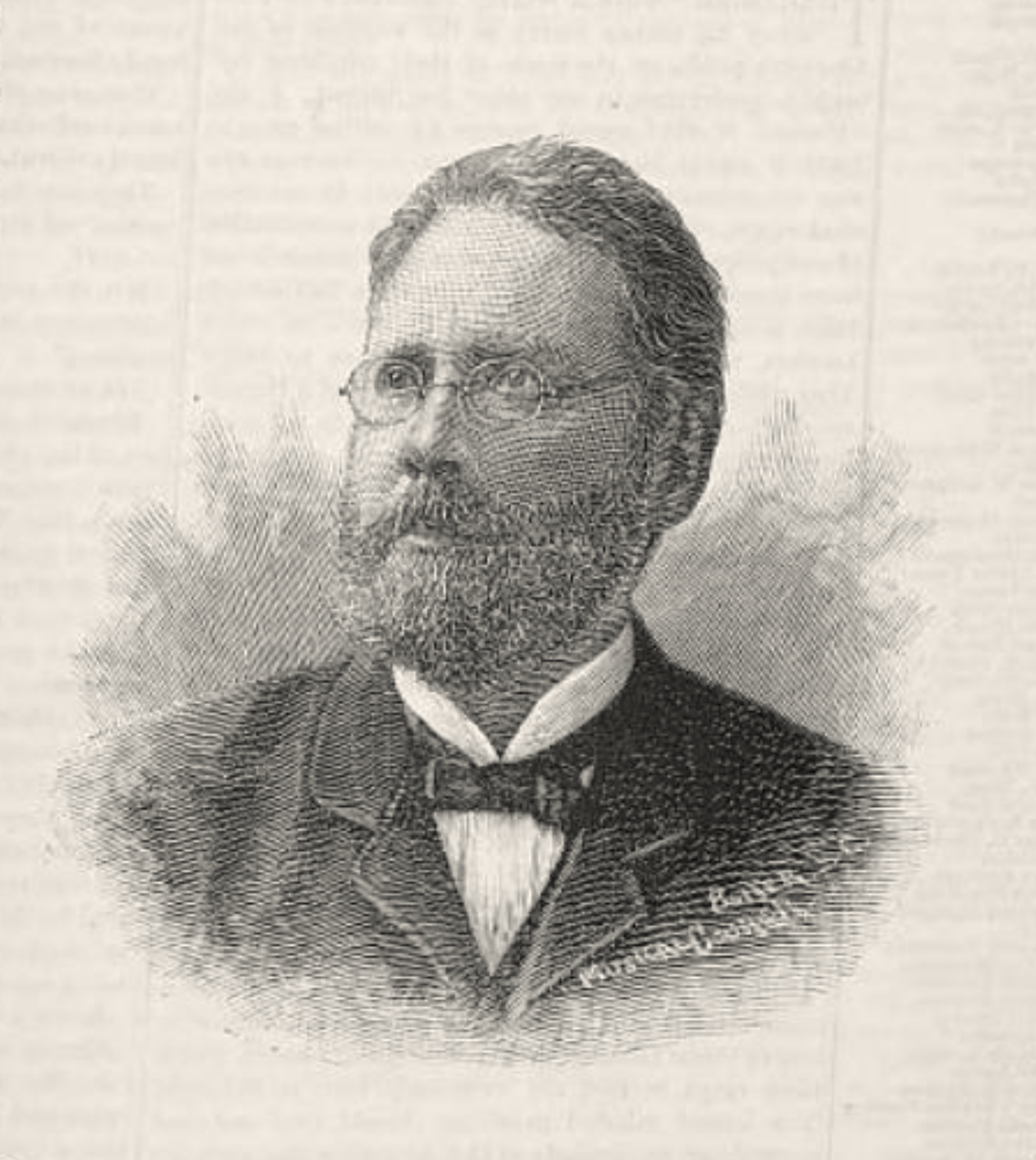
Carl Baermann (1839–1913)

Carl Baermann (9 July 1839 – 17 January 1913) was a German-born American pianist and composer. He should not be confused with his father, the clarinetist and composer Carl Baermann.

== Life and career ==
The son of clarinetist and composer Carl Baermann, Carl Baermann was born in Munich, Germany on 9 July 1839. His grandfather was clarinet virtuoso Heinrich Baermann and his grandmother was operatic soprano Helene Harlaß. He studied the piano at the Royal Bavarian Music School with Christian Wanner and Andreas Wohlmuth (1809–1884), and composition with Franz Lachner and Peter Cornelius in Munich. He later became a student and friend of Franz Liszt. He taught at the Royal Bavarian Music School (now the University of Music and Theatre Munich), being made professor there in 1876. Some of his notable pupils at that institution included Lothar Kempter and Bruno Klein.

In 1881 Baermann immigrated to the United States to join the faculty of the New England Conservatory where he taught until his death more than 30 years later. On 22 December 1881, he made his US debut as a pianist in Boston, where he remained active as a pianist and teacher. Among his students were Amy Beach, Lee Pattison, Frederick Converse, Dai Buell and George Copeland. He composed a number of works for piano solo and with orchestra; among his published works of the former include 12 Etüden, Op. 4 (in Offenbach by the firm Johann André, 1887) and Polonaise pathétique (1914).

Baermann died in Newton, Massachusetts on 17 January 1913.
