= Harold Bauer =

English musician (1873–1951)

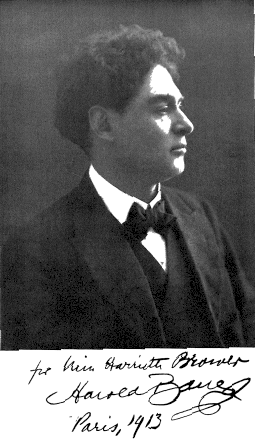
- Bauer in Paris, 1913
- Born: Harold Victor Bauer; 28 April 1873; Kingston upon Thames, Royal Borough of Kingston upon Thames, London, England, U.K.
- Died: 12 March 1951 (aged 77); Miami, Florida, U.S.
- Education: Student of Ignacy Jan Paderewski
- Occupations: Musician; music educator
- Employers: Manhattan School of Music; University of Miami; University of Hartford Hartt School
- Spouse(s): Maria Knapp (m. 1906–1940) (her death) Wynne Pyle (m. 1941–1951) (his death)
- Musical career
- Instruments: Piano; Violin

Harold Victor Bauer (28 April 1873 – 12 March 1951) was an English-born pianist of Jewish heritage who began his musical career as a violinist.

== Early life, education and childhood career ==
Harold Victor Bauer was born in Kingston upon Thames in southwest London; his father was a German violinist and his mother was English. He took up the study of the violin under the direction of his father and Adolf Pollitzer. He made his debut as a violinist in London in 1883, and for nine years toured England.

In 1892, however, Bauer went to Paris and studied the piano under Ignacy Jan Paderewski for a year, though still maintaining his interest in the violin. An anecdote reports that Paderewski jokingly told Bauer to concentrate on the piano because "You have such beautiful hair".

== Career ==
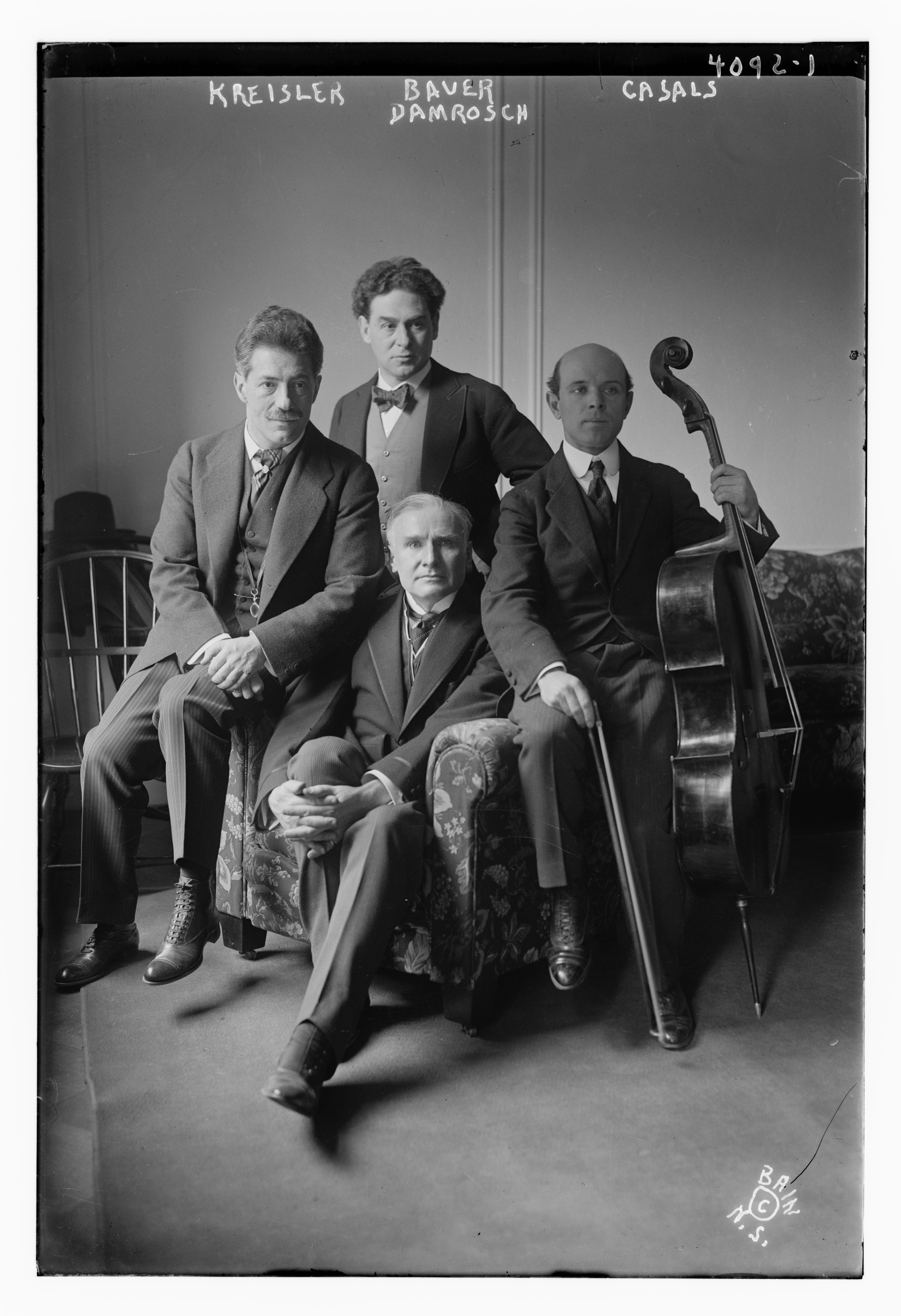
Fritz Kreisler, Harold Bauer, Pablo Casals, and Walter Damrosch at Carnegie Hall in New York City, 13 March 1917

In 1893, in Paris, he and Achille Rivarde premiered Frederick Delius's Violin Sonata in B major.

During 1893–94, Bauer travelled all through Russia accompanying the noted soprano Mademoiselle Nikita and giving piano recitals and concerts, after which he returned to Paris. Further recitals in Paris brought him renown, and he almost immediately received engagements in France, Germany and Spain. His reputation was rapidly enhanced by these performances, and his field of operation extended through the Netherlands, Belgium, Switzerland, England, Scandinavia and the United States.

In 1900, Bauer made his debut in the U.S. with the Boston Symphony Orchestra, performing the US premiere of Johannes Brahms's Piano Concerto No.1 in D minor. On 18 December 1908, he gave the world-premiere performance of Claude Debussy's piano suite Children's Corner in Paris. After that, Bauer settled in the U.S., and was a founder of the Beethoven Association.

Between 1915 and 1929, he recorded over 100 pieces for the Duo-Art and Ampico reproducing pianos, one of the most prolific virtuoso pianists in this medium of his era.

Efrem Zimbalist and Harold Bauer playing Beethoven's Theme and Variations from Violin Sonata No. 9 ("The Kreutzer Sonata"), 1926

Bauer was also an influential teacher and editor and was head of the piano department at the Manhattan School of Music. Starting in 1941, Bauer taught winter master classes in the University of Miami and served as a visiting professor in the University of Hartford Hartt School of Music with maestro and founder Moshe Paranov and the head of the piano department, Raymond Hanson, from 1946 until his death in Miami, Florida, in 1951.

He published Harold Bauer, His Book (New York, 1948).

=== Students ===
Bauer's students included George Copeland, Winifred Christie, Vera Franceschi, Robert Schrade, Frank Sheridan, Abbey Simon, Bruce Simonds, Eleanor Spencer, and Dora Zaslavsky. Bauer taught many other prominent pianists in his day, including composer Viola Cole-Audet, John Elvin, who was a piano professor at Oberlin College in Ohio and Consuelo Elsa Clark, a piano teacher at the New York College of Music from 1918 to 1968 and the teacher of the composer Michael Jeffrey Shapiro.

=== Recordings ===
- A Review of the Complete Acoustic Solo Recordings of Harold Bauer
- Harold Bauer plays Bach – Chromatic Fantasy and Fugue in Dm – Phillips/Duo-Art Rolls 7316/7317, issued April 1929

== Personal life ==
Harold's sister, Ethel Bauer, was also a concert pianist active in London.

Bauer was married twice. He first married the divorcée Maria Knapp (1861–1940) in 1906 until her death. In January 1941, he married a colleague and his former student, the concert pianist Wynne Pyle. He had no children by either marriage.

== See also ==
- List of classical pianists
- List of people from London
- List of people from New York City
