= Society of British Musicians =

The Society of British Musicians was a Society founded in 1834, dedicated to promoting the composition and performance of British music. It gave concerts of works by leading British composers of the day. The Society was dissolved in 1865.

== Founding and early years ==
The Society was founded in 1834 with the object of advancing native talent in composition and performance. In the original prospectus of the Society, attention was called to the contrast between the encouragement offered to British painting, sculpture, and other arts at the Royal Academy, and the comparative neglect of English music and English musicians, the overwhelming preponderance of foreign compositions in all musical performances being cited as "calculated to impress the public with the idea that musical genius is an alien to this country," and as tending also "to repress those energies and to extinguish that emulation in the breast of the youthful aspirant, which alone can lead to pre-eminence."

One of the rules adopted was to exclude all foreign music from the programmes of the Society's concerts and to admit none but natives of Great Britain among its members; but this was set aside in 1841, when the Committee reported in favour of "introducing a limited proportion of music by composers not members of the Society either British or foreign," and the suggestion was adopted, though not without strong opposition, in which the editor of The Musical World joined (The Musical World, 14 October 1841).

In its earlier days the Society achieved a complete success, numbering in 1836 as many as 350 members, while its finances were also in a prosperous state. It not only gave concerts of works of established merit, but adopted a system of trial performances at which many new compositions were heard. The programmes included the names of all the leading English composers of the day, who as a rule conducted their own works, among them Cipriani Potter, G. A. Macfarren, W. H. Holmes, W. L. Phillips, Sterndale Bennett, J. Hullah, J. H. Griesbach, T. German Reed, W. M. Rooke, H. Westrop, Joseph Barnett, H. C. Litolff, C. Lucas, T. M. Mudie, James Calkin, and John Goss.

The music included orchestral and chamber compositions, varied by vocal solos and part-music, to which nearly all the above-named composers contributed original works, and the members in turn directed the performances.

== Decline ==
After 1837 the Society began to decline. Even after it was decided to introduce music by foreign composers, in the hope of creating more general interest in the concerts, it failed to restore the Society to prosperity; after another period of far from successful management, a special appeal for support was made at the close of 1854. At that date the members included Henry Charles Banister, Sterndale Bennett, H. Blagrove, J. B. Calkin, C. Coote, J. T. Cooper, W. H. Holmes, C. E. Horsley, H. Lazarus, E. J. Loder, Kate Loder, C. Neate, W. S. Rockstro, C. Severn, C. Steggall, C. E. Stephens, J. W. Thirlwall, H. J. Trust, J. Weslake, H. Westrop, J. Zerbini, and Sir George Smart.

This effort was ridiculed in The Musical World of 16 December 1854, on the ground that the Society had no true claim to its title, as many composers and artists of note held aloof from it. The special appeal served however to draw some new friends to the ranks; as a means of fulfilling its objectives, prizes were offered for chamber compositions, which were gained in 1861 by Ebenezer Prout and Edward Perry for string quintets; in 1863 by J. Lea Summers and W. Gibbons, also for string quintets; and in 1864 by Ebenezer Prout and J. Lea Summers, for quartets for piano and strings. The umpires on these occasions included Joseph Joachim, Bernhard Molique, Carlo Alfredo Piatti, Cipriani Potter, G. A. Macfarren, A. Mellon, T. M. Mudie and H. Leslie; the prize works were publicly performed by Agnes Zimmermann, Joseph Joachim, A. Mellon, H. Webb, J. T. Carrodus, W. Watson, J. T. Willy, W. T. Aylward, and Carlo Piatti.

In 1865 the Society was dissolved, its library was sold by Messrs. Puttick & Simpson, and C. E. Stephens was appointed custodian of the minute-books and other documents.

== Society's officers and locations ==
The secretaries of the Society were: J. R. Tutton (its founder) 1834–5; G. J. Baker, 1835 until his death in 1851; J. Rackham, 1851–54; W. W. Grice 1854–55. The Honorary Treasurers were the three brothers, Jacob Erat from 1834 until his death in 1837; James Erat from 1837 until his death in 1858; and William Erat (pro tem.) 1858; and Cipriani Potter, 1858–65.

The Society and its library were housed free of charge at 23 Berners Street by the Erat brothers from 1834 until 1858, when they gave up the premises; 1858–59 in Wornum's Music Hall, Store Street; 1860 in St Martin's Hall until its destruction by fire on 26 August 1860 (when the Society's property was saved); 1860–62 at 44 Charlotte Street, Fitzroy Square, by permission of Mr H. Webb; and 1862–65 at Messrs. Collard's, Grosvenor Street, free of all expense.

== Performance venues ==
For the first five years the concerts were given at the Hanover Square Rooms, and the trials of orchestral and chamber works were subsequently held at those rooms or at the above-named buildings.

On 20 July 1843, the Society gave a complimentary concert to Louis Spohr at Erat's, and on 15 June 1844, at the same place, gave a complimentary concert to Felix Mendelssohn.

== See also ==
British Music Society
