= De Candole =

de Candole may refer to:

- Henry de Candole (priest) - The Very Rev Henry Lawe Corry Vully de Candole DD, MA (1868–1933) Dean of Bristol.
- Armar Corry Vully de Candole - (1869–1941), Clerk in Holy Orders, brother of Henry de Candole (priest).
- James Alexander Corry Vully de Candole - (1871–1917), Clerk in Holy Orders, brother of Henry de Candole (priest).
- Henry de Candole - Henry Handley Vully de Candole (1895–1971), Bishop of Knaresborough, son of Henry de Candole (priest).
- Alec de Candole - Alexander Corry Vully de Candole (1897–1918), WW 1 poet, son of Henry de Candole (priest).
- Eric Armar Vully de Candole - (1901–1981), son of Armar Corry Vully de Candole.
- Charles Patrick de Candole - (1907–1997), Clerk in Holy Orders, son of James Alexander Corry Vully de Candole
- Donald Vully de Candole - (1912–1982), Clerk in Holy Orders, son of James Alexander Corry Vully de Candole
- John Armar Vully de Candole, M.C. - (1933-), soldier, son of Eric Armar Vully de Candole
- Mark Andrew Vully de Candole - (1953-), son of Eric Armar Vully de Candole
