= John Liptrot Hatton =

English composer and singer (1809–1886)

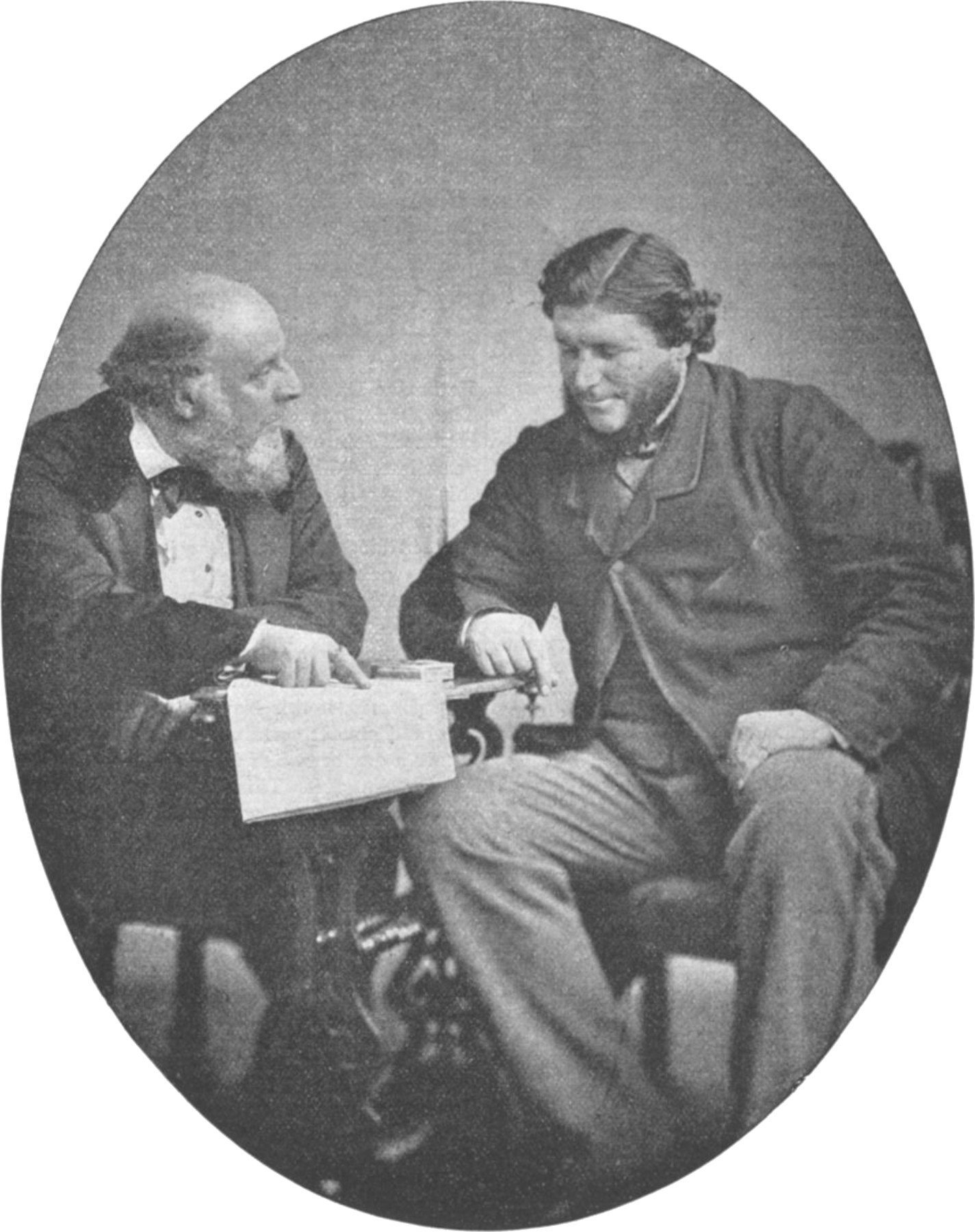
John Liptrot Hatton (left) with Charles Lockey

John Liptrot Hatton (12 October 1809 – 10 September 1886) was an English musical composer, conductor, pianist, accompanist and singer.

== Early career ==
Hatton was born in Liverpool to a musical family, for both his father John and grandfather were violinists. Although largely self-taught as a musician, he became a pupil of Michael Maybrick (uncle of the singer and composer Stephen Adams), who was also the teacher of Charles Santley's father, and also studied in the academy of a Mr. Molyneux. By the age of 16 he had become organist in the churches of Woolton and Childwall and at the Roman Catholic church in Liverpool. (Auditioning for Woolton, he played a voluntary upon the street-song "All round my Hat", hinting at his own name.) A man of many-sided talents and a broad humour attending them, he appeared as an actor on the Liverpool stage. Subsequently, he found his way to London as a member of Macready's company at Drury Lane, appearing in a cast led by Macready and Kean in Shakespeare's Othello in December 1832. Santley tells that Hatton took the part of Joe Blueskin (who has the song "Jolly Nose") in the play of Jack Sheppard when it was mounted independently at the Liver Theatre (the "Little Liver") in Liverpool. It happened to be staged simultaneously with the London production during 1839 in which Paul Bedford took the same role: Hatton scored so great a success that the London production disappointed when it came to Liverpool. Meanwhile, he was making his mark as a musician: in 1835 Thomas Attwood wrote to Mendelssohn, "We have recently had a new establishment here which is called 'The Society of British Musicians', in the hope of bringing forward native talent... I, however, wish you would look at your cloak, or great-coat, lest you should have had a bit cut out of it: for there is a young man of the name of Hatton, who seems to have got a little bit of it, indeed he seems to assimilate to your style without plagiary more than anyone I have met with."

== The composer in London and Vienna ==
In the winter season of 1842–43 he obtained an appointment directing the choruses in the English opera series at the Theatre Royal, Drury Lane, and in February 1843 his own first operetta, Queen of the Thames, or, The Anglers (libretto by Edward Fitzball), obtained a successful run of six performances. This included the madrigal "The merry bridal bells", sung by Miss Romer, Mr H Phillips and Mr Allen. Josef Staudigl, the eminent German bass, was a member of the company: at his suggestion Hatton wrote a more ambitious work, Pascal Bruno, again to a text by Fitzball. Hatton and Staudigl presented this new arrangement at Vienna in October 1844, as a benefit for Staudigl, who took the principal part. It had a mixed reception, and was not presented to a London audience, yet still the "Revenge" song, the only part to be published, was made very popular in England by Staudigl. Fitzball, finding that his text had been presented, in German, without his consent, the playbill naming "Herr Fixball" as the English author, was obliged to accept the situation, but it seems to have ended his association with Hatton. But Vienna greatly admired Hatton's piano playing, especially the fugues of J. S. Bach which he played from memory. While in Vienna he took the opportunity to study counterpoint under Sechter.

Soon after this he composed a number of songs modelled on the style of German classics, including some eighteen songs to words by Thomas Oliphant, who commissioned the songs, with German translations. Oliphant was a collector of music, and between 1840 and 1849 he catalogued the manuscript and printed music collections of the British Museum. He was "unsurpassed as a snapper-up of unconsidered madrigalian trifles", and his personal collections were made up, after his death in 1873, into nearly 600 lots for sale. Hatton's Oliphant songs were published in England under the pseudonym "P. B. Czapek" (alluding to the Hungarian word for a Hat, for "Hatton"), and became Oliphant's property, as did other of Hatton's copyrights. Among Hatton's settings for his collaborator were "Streamlet gently flowing", "Autumn reflections", "The goldsmith's daughter", and "My days have been so wondrous free".

In 1846 he appeared at the Three Choirs Festival as a singer, and also played a piano concerto of Mozart. He undertook concert tours at about this time with Sivori, Vieuxtemps and others, serving both as accompanist and solo pianist. He also gave monodramatic entertainments, as for example in this description of a concert in the Assembly Rooms at Peckham in December 1846: "Mr J.L. Hatton was the Atlas of the entertainment, and bore the weight of the concert on his own shoulders. He lectured, sang, and performed on the pianoforte. Like Malaprop's Cerberus, he was three gentlemen at once. The entertainment was novel and interesting. Mr. Hatton gave some capital specimens of pianoforte music by various masters including Corelli, Bach, Handel, Mozart, Beethoven, etc. He sang songs comic, sentimental, and serious. He levied contributions upon many nations for their compositions, and kept his audience alternately moved with delight and excited with laughter. Mr Hatton was modest enough not to obtrude too many of his own works upon his visitors. 'The Adventures of Robinson Crusoe', a song intended, no doubt, to be very comic, was the only composition of Mr Hatton's performed during the evening." Although differing in that – on that occasion – Hatton did not perform many of his own compositions, this style of one-man entertainment with speech, songs and a keyboard with accessories had been pioneered by Charles Dibdin more than fifty years previously, in his Entertainments Sans Souci: Hatton was certainly well aware of the example of Dibdin.

== First American tour ==
From 1848 to 1850 Hatton was in America, and in 1848 gave several public and private concerts in New York City. For example, on 12 September, at the Apollo Theatre, he performed his own comic songs as well as works by Handel, Field and Scarlatti. In Pittsburgh, Pennsylvania, in that year, he shared the stage with Stephen C. Foster. "Contemporary [American] critics deplored the failure of the public to appreciate his great art." He did pander to the public on occasion: in Boston, where he obtained a position in the Handel and Haydn Society, he performed Bach Fugues and a Mendelssohn piano concerto, but also sang "Christmas Sleigh Ride" while he played the piano and jangled sleigh bells, all to the great amusement of the crowd. It is said that on the next day he was due to conduct a performance of Mendelssohn's Elijah (first performed 1846) at which, the baritone being indisposed, Hatton in the relevant numbers turned to face the audience from the conductor's podium and sang the title role himself.

== Song-writer and accompanist ==
Hatton composed various songs to poems by Robert Herrick (including his famous "To Anthea"), Ben Jonson and Charles Sedley at this time which were published in and before 1850. Others became the property of Thomas Oliphant. In his August 1850 Preface, Hatton says that they were written "at different times under various circumstances. Some few of them were composed previous to my departure to America in the autumn of the year 1848, and presented as little souvenirs to several of my friends on my leaving England. The rest with one exception were written entirely for my own amusement during the time I was away, and all of them were composed without any view to their publication... On my return to England I was urged by one of my friends... to make a complete collection of these little compositions and publish them in a consolidated form. The kindness of my friends in restoring me some of my MSS. has enabled me to do this, and I now send these songs forth into the world, satisfied if they should be the means, in however humble a degree, of adding to the material of musical enjoyment, or of contributing anything to the regeneration of the popular taste in an important department of chamber music." It was also during the 1840s that he wrote "Simon the Cellarer", another abiding favourite (which he sold to Oliphant for "a £10 note"). This was incorporated into the ballad opera Diamond cut diamond by Henri Drayton in 1859. Charles Santley, who championed "To Anthea" and "Simon the Cellarer" singing them with Hatton accompanying, lived long enough to record them both, twice, in the early 20th century, preserving his association with the composer.

Hatton was one of the great accompanists of his time, and during the 1850s he toured with Mario and Grisi, and with Sims Reeves. For Mario he composed his famous song "Good-night, sweetheart, good-night", instructing him in the pronunciation of the words and coaching him in the music before it had been committed to manuscript. It was this, and "Com'è gentil" from Don Pasquale, that became the two favourite songs most associated with Mario. Hatton toured with Reeves in 1850 before returning briefly to America, and made a tour to Dublin, Belfast and Manchester with him in 1853, on which occasion, in Dublin, Reeves first sang "Good-night, sweetheart". Mario sang it suavely, and with an Italian accent, so as to break one's heart; Reeves made it vigorous and soul-stirring. Hatton composed Anglican church music including a morning and evening service in E, and a number of anthems such as Come Holy Ghost and Blessed be the Lord of Israel.

Reeves, on account of Hatton's appearance with a bald dome and surrounding fringe, used to call him "The Sultan". Hatton used to perform a comic song "The little fat man" which was supposed to be a skit on himself. When, for instance, he sang it before the Leeds Rational Recreation Society in April 1853, he also performed "La ci darem la mano" with Mme D'Anteny, gave his own song "Day and Night", and finished off with Handel's "O ruddier than the cherry" (from Acis and Galatea). Then the Leeds Madrigal and Motet Society performed his work "Sailors Beware!" Hatton was always very diverse. In 1856 his secular cantata of Robin Hood, to a text by George Linley, was given at the Bradford Festival.

Hatton became a foremost exponent of the writing of glees and part songs, both through his love of English madrigals, and through the influences he derived from German music. His connection with Oliphant had given him an immediate path of information and study. A visit to England of the Cologne Choir is thought to have given new impetus to the glee movement in England, and Hatton was in the vanguard. Their harmonised melodies, German part-songs by Mendelssohn and others, were called glees in imitation of the English glees, and attracted a great deal of interest. Among all English composers, Hatton with his new understanding of the German music and his sure foundation in the English melodious idiom, responded by producing a series of part-songs of which it has been said "they were imitated by many but surpassed by none." On his return from America Hatton became conductor of the Glee and Madrigal Union, and it was during the 1850s, while working with Charles Kean, that he published the first of his several collections of part songs, including "Absence", "When evening's twilight", "The happiest land", etc. They were performed by the "Orpheus Vocal Union", a group of professional singers led by William Fielding. Hatton thus set the example for others like Henry Smart, George Alexander Macfarren and Walter Macfarren and very many more who followed where he led.

== Shakespeare music for Charles Kean ==
From about 1853 Hatton was engaged as Director of Music at the Princess's Theatre, London to provide and conduct the music for Charles Kean's Shakespearean revivals. In this capacity he composed music for Sardanapalus King of Assyria (the orchestra including six harps) and for Macbeth, both in 1853. He wrote an overture, and entr'actes, for Faust and Marguerite in 1854; his music for Shakespeare's Henry VIII (1855) was dedicated to Mrs Charles Kean; in 1856 his music for Kean's revival of Sheridan's Pizarro replaced the old score by Michael Kelly. Only the glee by Kelly was kept. Kean sought authenticity: Hatton rewrote it completely, "based on Indian airs... founded on melodies published in Rivero and Tschudi's work on Peruvian Antiquities as handed down to us by Spaniards after the conquest." He wrote music for Richard II in 1857, and for King Lear, The Merchant of Venice, and Much Ado About Nothing in 1858. Reference is also found for music to Henry V, for which several mediaeval instruments were required. The arrangement with Kean seems to have collapsed in a legal dispute of 1859. As the music for Much Ado About Nothing had not been published, Hatton sought to show that it remained his own property and could be adapted or performed at his discretion. The court, however, found that it was an inseparable part of Kean's design, and ruled against him.

== Later career ==
Hatton's third opera, Rose, or Love's Ransom (text by Henry Sutherland Edwards), was presented at the Royal English Opera, Covent Garden in 1864. It had the advantage of Helen Lemmens-Sherrington and Mr and Mrs Willoughby Weiss, George Perren, Henry Corri, and Aynsley Cook, but it met with little success. It was in that year that the Ballad Concerts at St James's Hall, London, commenced, for which Hatton held the post of accompanist for the first nine seasons. Hatton developed a fondness for the seaside town of Aldeburgh, in Suffolk, where he lived for some time, and was certainly staying there in October 1865. In this connection he wrote a four-part Aldeburgh Te Deum in commemoration of the place he loved.

In 1866 he went again to America, where as a member of H. L. Bateman's Concert Troupe he took part in the inaugural concert of the Steinway Hall in New York on 31 October. His daughter, Frances J. Hatton, emigrated to Canada in 1869, where she became a respected composer and the singing instructor at the Hellmuth Ladies' College in London, Ontario.

Hatton was responsible for re-editing the first two volumes of Songs of England, an influential published collection which helped to establish a canon of English song with accompaniments, and cumulatively ran to three volumes under the later editorship of Eaton Faning. Hatton remarked, "I have culled the choicest of the old ditties... The names of Purcell, Arne, Shield, Dibdin, Horn and Bishop are household words, and no English collection would be complete which did not contain the best songs of these composers... New symphonies and accompaniments have been written to more than fifty of the old songs." His selection also drew substantially on Chappell's Popular Music of Olden Time, in which many of the accompaniments were rewritten by George Alexander Macfarren, and contrasted with Hullah's Song Book of 1866, in which only the unaccompanied melodies were given. He also edited the companion volume of Songs of Ireland, with J. L. Molloy, a volume of Comic songs, and a volume of the songs by Robert Schumann, for Boosey & Co.

Among the sources for Songs of England was The Beggar's Opera of John Gay and Dr Pepusch. Hatton collaborated with John Oxenford (who died in 1877) on a performing edition, providing it with new symphonies and accompaniments, which replaced the old one by Stephen Storace, and was itself replaced in 1920 by Frederic Austin's version for Nigel Playfair. Hatton and Oxenford also produced editions of Shield and Mrs. Brooke's Rosina, Arne and Bickerstaffe's Love in a Village and Storace and Hoare's No song, no supper.

In 1875 Hatton went to Stuttgart, and also wrote a sacred musical drama, Hezekiah, given at The Crystal Palace in 1877; like all his larger works it met with moderate success. In his last years he lived at Margate in Kent, and died there on 20 September 1886.

Hatton's sheer versatility, his multifarious skills and interests, his energy and the exuberance of his good nature, characterised one of the extraordinary musicians of his age: and yet these same qualities led some to disparage his brilliance. His biographer for the Encyclopædia Britannica of 1911 wrote: "Hatton excelled in the lyrical forms of music, and, in spite of his distinct skill in the severer styles of the madrigal, &c., he won popularity by such songs as "To Anthea", "Good-bye, Sweetheart", and "Simon the Cellarer", the first of which may be called a classic in its own way. His glees and part-songs, such as "When Evening's Twilight", are still reckoned among the best of their class; and he might have gained a place of higher distinction among English composers had it not been for his irresistible animal spirits and a want of artistic reverence, which made it uncertain in his younger days whether, when he appeared at a concert, he would play a fugue of Bach or sing a comic song." Yet he was not irreverent: the lasting value of his own ballads and songs, of which he composed more than 150, the merits of his arrangements of the English songs, his role as composer to Kean and accompanist to Mario, Reeves and Santley, and his service over a long period to Boosey both as publishers and as promoters of the Ballad Concerts, tell their own story of his unique place in English music.
