= Thomas Molleson Mudie =

Thomas Molleson Mudie (30 November 1809 – 24 July 1876) was a British composer and teacher, highly regarded during his early career, but composing little in later years.

== Life ==
Mudie, of Scottish descent, was born in Chelsea, London on 30 November 1809. He showed musical talent from an early age, and in the first examination for admission to the Royal Academy of Music in 1823, he came third out of 32 candidates. He studied composition with William Crotch, piano with Cipriani Potter and clarinet with Thomas Willman, and achieved great success. He was appointed a professor of the piano in the academy in 1832, and held the post until 1844. From 1834 he was organist at Gatton, Surrey, and became a friend there of Lord Monson. He remained as organist after Lord Monson's death in 1840, until 1844, when on the death of his friend Alfred Devaux, he went to Edinburgh to succeed him as a teacher of music. In 1863 he returned to London; from that time, except for an overture performed at a concert at the Crystal Palace, he came little before the public. He died in London, unmarried, on 24 July 1876, and was interred in Highgate Cemetery.

== Compositions ==
As a composer Mudie's successes were mainly confined to his earlier years. While a student at the academy his song "Lungi dal caro bene" was thought so meritorious that the committee paid the cost of its publication. Several vocal pieces with orchestral accompaniment, and symphonies in C and in B flat, were also composed while he was a student. The Society of British Musicians gave him much encouragement, and at their concerts there were performances of a symphony in F (1835), a symphony in D (1837), a quintet in E flat for piano and strings (1843), a trio in D for piano and strings (1843), and several songs and concerted vocal pieces. While in Edinburgh he composed a number of piano pieces and songs, and wrote accompaniments for a large proportion of the airs in Wood's Songs of Scotland.

His published music consists of forty-eight piano solos, six piano duets, nineteen fantasias, twenty-four sacred songs, three sacred duets, three chamber anthems for three voices, forty-two separate songs, and two duets. The existing scores of his symphonies and all his printed works were deposited in the library of the Royal Academy of Music.

George Alexander Macfarren wrote in A Dictionary of Music and Musicians (1900): "In the obscurity of provincial practice as a teacher Mudie seems to have lost incentive to artistic exertion, and with the incentive almost the power. He must be regarded less as a musician of promise than as one of fulfilment, and it would be highly to the credit of any concert-giving institution of the day to unearth some of those works...."
