= Charles Edward Stephens =

English composer and instrumentalist

Charles Edward Stephens (1821–1892) was an English musician and composer.

== Life ==
He was born in London at 12 Portman Place (now part of Edgware Road) on 18 March 1821, and was nephew to the singer Catherine Stephens. He studied the piano and violin under J. M. Rost, Cipriani Potter, F. Smith, and Henry Blagrove, and theory under James Alexander Hamilton.

After school, Stephens was organist successively to St Mark's, Myddelton Square; Holy Trinity, Paddington; St John's, Hampstead; St Clement Danes; and St Saviour's, Paddington, where he resigned in 1875. He died in London on 13 July 1892 and was buried at Kensal Green Cemetery. He was a fellow or member of many of the English musical institutions, being an original member of the Musical Association in 1874.

== Works ==
Stephens wrote numerous compositions. They included a symphony in G minor, played at the Philharmonic in 1891, and piano and chamber music. In 1880 he gained both the first and second prizes for string quartets offered by Trinity College, London.
