= The Old House at Home =

"The Old House at Home" is a sentimental 19th century ballad written by Thomas Haynes Bayly (1797–1839).

The lyrics are a two stanza poem about childhood and yearning for home:

"Oh! the old house at home where my forefathers dwelt,
Where a child at the feet of my mother I knelt,
Where she taught me the pray'r, where she read me the page,
Which, if infancy lisps, is the solace of age;
My heart, 'mid all changes, wherever I roam,
Ne'er loses its love for the old house at home!"

The song came to the public attention after being set to music by Edward Loder. It first appeared in Loder's 1838 opera "Francis the First". This was one of Loder's lesser operas, which were merely vehicles for his lucrative popular songs. A review of the opening night was less than complimentary; "The few of the public who were present thought it the most stupid piece of trash that ever disgraced the stage; in which opinion we entirely agree with them...". Nevertheless, the song was soon very popular on both sides of the Atlantic.

== Other uses ==
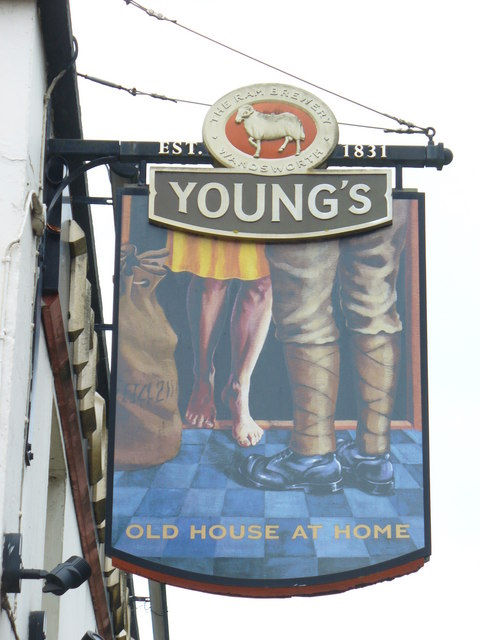
Pub sign for "The Old House at Home" in Dorking.

The title of the song was re-used by Edward Loder's cousin, the composer and conductor George Loder (1816–1868), for a musical entertainment that he co-wrote in 1862, which did not include the song itself.

There are currently 25 public houses in England with the name "Old House at Home", probably named after the original song.
