= Henry de Candole =

English Bishop

Henry Handley Vully de Candole (1895–1971) was Bishop of Knaresborough from 1949 to 1965.

== Background ==
De Candole was born on 25 May 1895 into a clerical family – his father was the Ven. Henry Lawe Corry Vully de Candole, who had two brothers:-

- The Rev. Armar Corry Vully de Candole (13 June 1869 – Q4, 1941), who was married on 19 December 1897 in Paris to Edith Hodgson.
- The Rev. James Alexander Corry Vully de Candole (25 May 1871 in Kensington – 3 May 1917 at Ipswich) who was married on 8 August 1900 at Motherwell, Scotland to Mary Paterson (born 8 August 1876).

De Candole's mother was Helen (Edith) Thompson (1860–1930), the daughter of Sir Henry Thompson, 1st Baronet and Lady Kate Thompson, née Loder

H. H. V. de Candole was a grandson of Henry Sundius Vully de Candole (25 June 1841 at Bierlow, Yorks – May 1877 at Barton Regis, Glocs) and his wife Emily Roe Lawe (born in India in 1843; died in London in March 1899).

His only sibling was Alexander Corry de Candole, the "War Poet" (born 26 January 1897 at Cheltenham, k.i.a. Bonningues, 3 September 1918) see "A Deep Cry"

== Education ==
De Candole was educated at Marlborough College and King's College, Cambridge. In 1920 he studied for ordination at Westcott House, Cambridge before returning to his old school as Assistant Chaplain.

== Career ==
From 1920 until 1926 he was Resident Chaplain to the Archbishop of Canterbury, followed by a curacy in Newcastle upon Tyne.

After two years as Chaplain at Peterhouse, Cambridge de Candole served in a variety of posts within the Diocese of Chichester between 1937 and 1949. He took charge of Wiston Church, Sussex in 1939–40, while the rector was absent on Army service and was Vicar of Henfield from 1940 to 1949. In 1949 he was appointed Suffragan Bishop of Knaresborough where he combined pastoral duties with service to the “Parish and People” movement.

A prolific author (see Bibliography below) and a Liturgist he died on 16 June 1971. He bequeathed his large amount of diaries to the nation. They are currently held at Lambeth Palace Library, and a distillation of these has been published.

== Family ==
In Q2, 1937 in Scarborough, he married Frances Sophia Cornwall (born Monmouth, Q4, 1896). They had known each other and corresponded for more than 20 years, but she had been a missionary in Africa. They had no children.

== Bibliography ==
- "The Church's Offering: A Brief Study of Eucharistic Worship", 1935
- "The Sacraments and the Church: A study in the corporate nature of Christianity", 1935
- "The Church's Prayers", 1939
- "The Story of Henfield", 1947
- "Prayers of The World-Wide Church", 1947
- "Lent with the Church", 1952
- "The Christian Use of the Psalms", 1955
- "Headings for the Lessons: For Sundays and Principal Holy Days in The Table of Lessons", 1959
- "Helps to preaching at the Parish Communion", 1961
- "Re-Shaping the Liturgy" with Arthur Couratin 1964
- "Headings for the Lessons" with David John Cooke, 1966
- "Being the Church Today: A Collection of Sermons and Addresses", 1974 (posthumously)

== Notes ==
Church of England titles
Preceded by John Bateman-Champain	Bishop of Knaresborough; 1949–1965	Succeeded by John Howard Cruse
