= Henry Westrop =

English organist and composer

Henry John Westrop (22 July 1812 – 23 September 1879) was an English organist, violinist and composer.

== Life ==
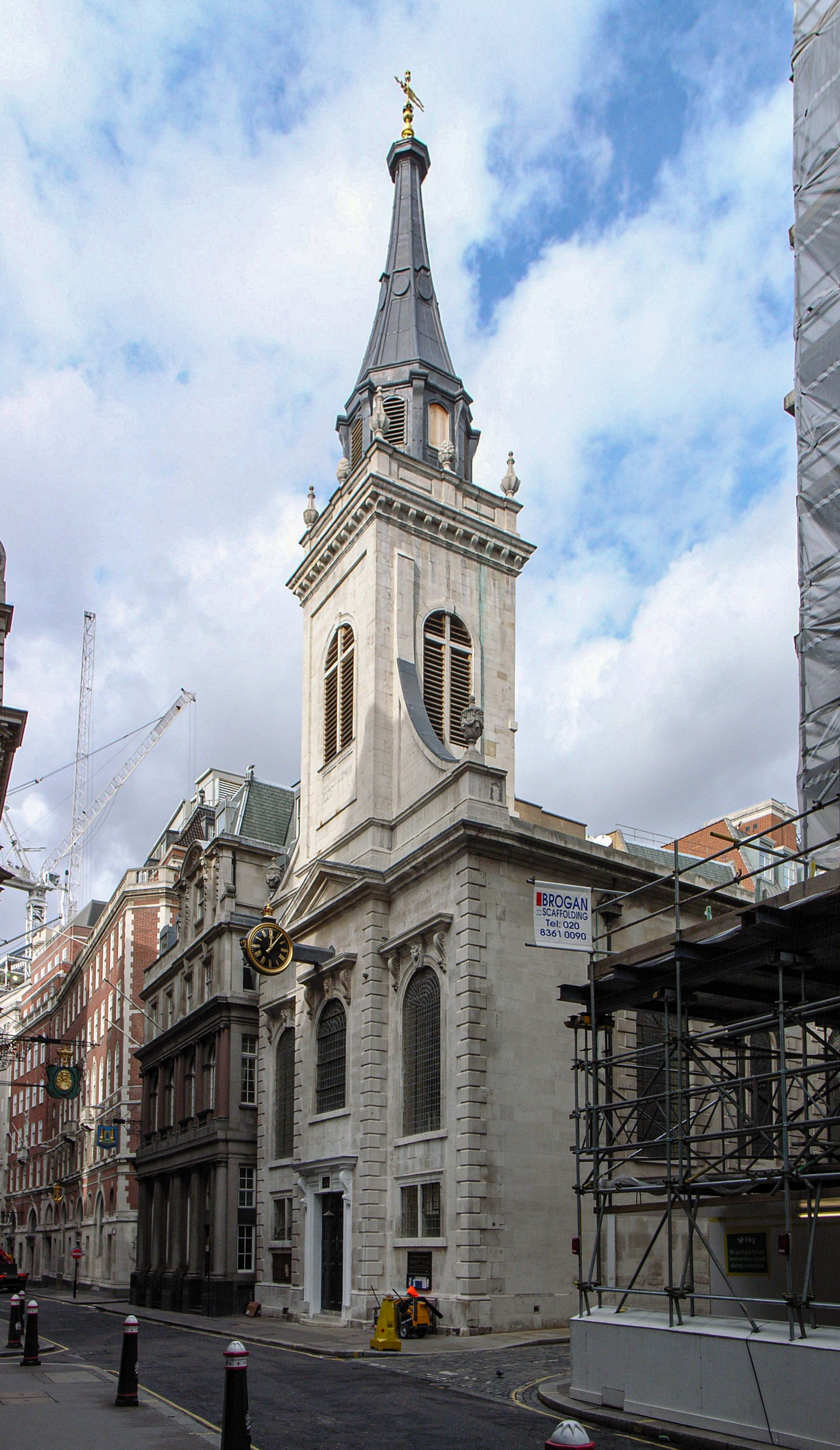
St Edmund, King and Martyr, in Lombard Street

Westrop was born in 1812 in Lavenham, Suffolk, and made his first appearance at 13, at the Sudbury Theatre as pianist, violinist and singer. He afterwards became organist at St. Stephen's, Norwich; in 1831 at Little Stanmore; in 1832 at Fitzroy Chapel in Maple Street, London, and in 1834 at St Edmund, Lombard Street, London, retaining the post until his death in 1879. He was buried on the western side of Highgate Cemetery.

He at one time played the violin at the Royal Italian Opera and the Philharmonic Society, of which he was a member.

== Family ==
His daughter Kate, a pianist, succeeded him as organist in the city. His younger brothers, East John, and Thomas, were also musicians; Thomas's name is affixed to the translation of Charles-Simon Catel's Treatise on Harmony (1876).

== Works ==
His biographer in A Dictionary of Music and Musicians commented: "Westrop's abilities as a composer were greater than his reception by musicians and the public would imply."

His compositions include quartets for strings and for piano and strings; Duo Concertante op. 6, for piano and flute; a sonata for piano and violin; piano pieces Greeting and Parting, in MS; and two piano quintets, in C minor and E♭, produced by the Society of British Musicians. He also wrote an opera, The Maid of Bremen, libretto by Edward Fitzball, written for Pyne and Harrison.
