= John David Loder =

English violinist

John David Loder (1788 – 13 February 1846) was an English violinist. He was a member of a musical family in Bath, Somerset; his career, beginning in Bath, developed beyond the city and he was later a professor of the violin at the Royal Academy of Music in London.

== Life ==
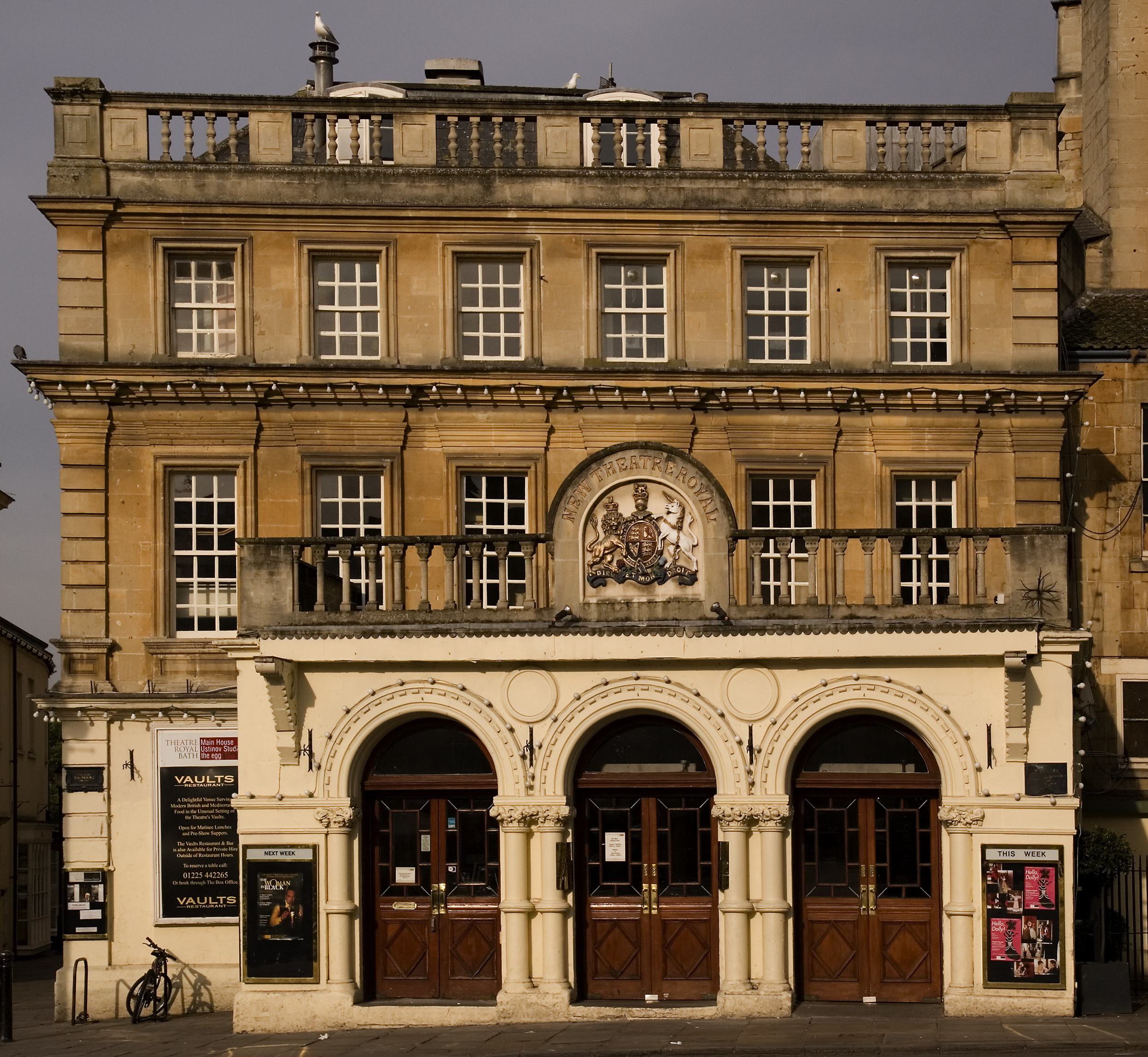
Theatre Royal, Bath

He was born in Bath in 1788, son of musician John Loder. His brother George Loder, a flautist, was father of George Loder, a conductor and composer, and Kate Loder, a pianist and composer. From 1799 until 1836 he was a member, and for most of the time leader, of the orchestra at the Theatre Royal in Bath.

In 1815 Loder became a member of the Philharmonic Society in London. On 12 May 1817 he led the society's orchestra for the first time; the Salisbury Journal reported: "he acquitted himself in a manner that stamps him at once as a first-rate musician". He played for the society many times between then and 1845. In 1837 he led the orchestra in the second performance in London of Beethoven's Ninth Symphony, 12 years after the first.

From about 1820 to 1835 he had a business in Milson Street, Bath, publishing music and selling musical instruments.

He was leader at the Yorkshire music festival in 1825, and soloist at the Gloucester music festival in 1826; he was leader at the Three Choirs Festivals from 1826 to 1845. From 1840 he was professor of violin at the Royal Academy of Music, and from 1841 he lived permanently in Chelsea, London. In 1844 he succeeded Franz Cramer as leader of the Concerts of Antient Music.

== Family ==
His wife, Rosamund Charles Mills, was the stepdaughter of the actor John Fawcett. Loder died at Albany Street, Regent's Park, on 13 February 1846, and was buried at Kensal Green Cemetery. He left a widow, and five sons and two daughters.

Three of his sons were musicians: Edward Loder (1809–1865) was a composer and conductor; Edward's twin brother John Fawcett Loder (1809–1853), a violinist, played in London theatre orchestras, and played the viola in Joseph Dando's string quartet from 1842 until 1853; William Sowerby Loder (1812–1851) studied the cello at the Royal Academy of Music and later played in Bath.

== Publications ==
- A General and Comprehensive Instruction Book for the Violin (1814): it was regarded as a standard work of instruction for the violin, and passed through many editions
- A First Set of Three Duets for two Violins (1837)
- The whole Modern Art of Bowing (1842)

== Cited sources ==
- Temperley, Nicholas (2016). Musicians of Bath and Beyond: Edward Loder (1809-1865) and His Family. Boydell & Brewer.
