= Henry Charles Banister =

19th-century British composer and music theorist

Henry Charles Banister (13 June 1831 – 20 November 1897) was an English composer, music theorist and author.

Banister was born in London, the son of Henry Joshua Banister (1803-1847), a cellist. He first attracted attention as a boy singer, performing Walpurgisnacht at a private concert with Mendelssohn accompanying. From 1847 he studied at the Royal Academy of Music with Cipriani Potter, and went on to teach at the academy in Tenterden Street, Hanover Square for over 46 years. From 1880 he was also a professor at the Guildhall School of Music, and taught at the Royal Normal College for the Blind in Upper Norwood.

He was known for his compositions and for his writings on music. There were four symphonies (1847, 1848, 1850 and 1858), five overtures, a fantasy for piano and orchestra, cantatas, chamber music, piano music and songs. The third symphony was performed for the first time at the Royal Academy of Music in April 1853. Its manuscript was acquired by the Bodleian Library in 2019. His string quartet in F sharp minor was first heard at a Society of British Musicians concert held in Erat's Harp Saloon, 23 Berners Street, on 29 December 1847.

Later in life Banister concentrated more on teaching and musical literature. His writings include Music (1872, with 15 further editions over the next 20 years), Musical Art and Study (1888), Some Musical Ethics and Analogies (1884) and a biography of G.A. Macfarren (1892). Lectures on Musical Analysis (1887) and Interludes (1898) are collections of his lectures.

Banister was living at 21, Gloucester Crescent, Camden Town in 1891. He died suddenly at his home, 9 Sternhold Avenue, Streatham on 20 November 1897, while seated at the piano, giving a lesson to one of his blind students. He was buried at Elmer's End Cemetery.
