= Charles Lockey =

English singer

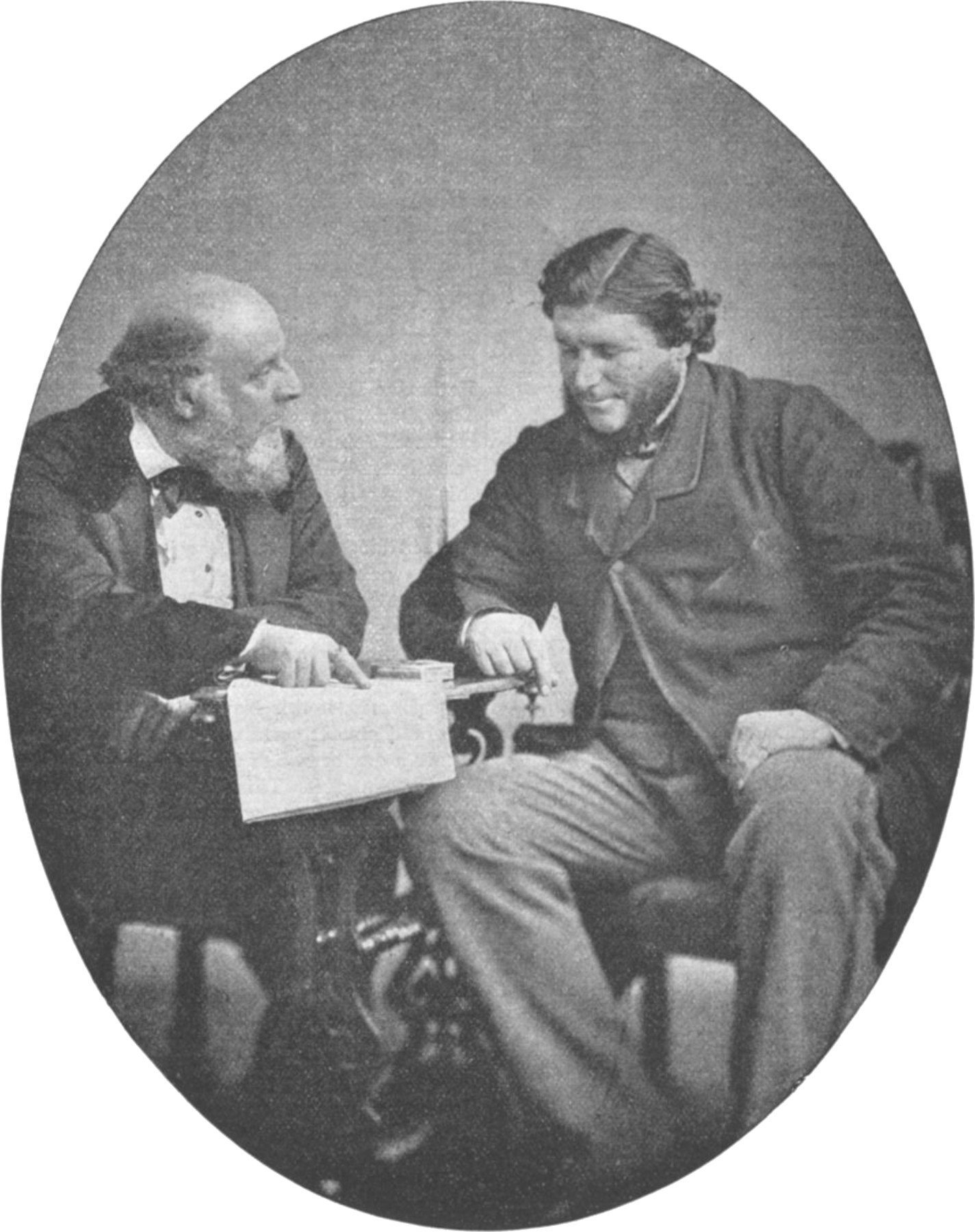
Charles Lockey (right) with John Liptrot Hatton

Charles Lockey (20 March 1820 – 3 December 1901) was an English singer. A tenor, he is known particularly as a soloist in the first performance of Mendelssohn's oratorio Elijah.

== Life ==
He was born in Thatcham in Berkshire, on 20 March 1820, son of Angel Lockey of Oxford. He was a choirboy at Magdalen College, Oxford, from 1828 to 1836, and afterwards studied singing with Edward Harris at Bath; in 1842 he was a pupil of Sir George Smart. Lockey sang in the choirs of St George's Chapel, Windsor, and Eton College Chapel. In 1843 he became a vicar-choral of St Paul's Cathedral.

His first public appearance in oratorio was in October 1842, when he sang in Rossini's Stabat Mater for the Melophonic Society. In 1848 he was appointed a Gentleman of the Chapel Royal. He performed at the Concerts of Antient Music in 1846; he also sang at concerts of the Three Choirs Festival and the Sacred Harmonic Society.

In 1846 Lockey was engaged for the Birmingham Festival: in the first performance, on 26 August, of Mendelssohn's oratorio Elijah he sang "Then shall the righteous". Mendelssohn, on hearing him rehearse the song, asked him also to sing "If with all your hearts", which had been assigned to another singer. "A young English tenor," the composer wrote in a letter, "sang the last air so very beautifully that I was obliged to collect myself to prevent my being overcome, and to enable me to beat time steadily."

On 24 May 1853 he married Martha Williams, a contralto singer (died 1897). They had four children, John, Charles, Richard and Martha. Apparently only one son, John, outlived Charles and Martha.

Lockey retired from public life about 1862, on account of a throat disorder, and entered into business at Gravesend and Dover. He nominally held his position at St Paul's until his death, but for forty-three years Fred Walker, Joseph Barnby, and Edward Lloyd were his deputies. He died on 3 December 1901 in Hastings.
