= Henry Francis Herbert Thompson =

Sir Henry Francis Herbert Thompson, 2nd Baronet (2 April 1859 – 26 May 1944) was a British Egyptologist.

Henry Thompson was born in London on 2 April 1859, the son of Sir Henry Thompson, 1st Baronet and Kate Fanny Loder, the composer and pianist. He was educated at Marlborough College and Trinity College, Cambridge. He first pursued careers in medicine and law: he was admitted to the Inner Temple in 1878 and called to the bar in 1882.

Through Flinders Petrie, Thompson became interested in Egyptology. He worked with Francis Llewellyn Griffith on manuscripts in demotic. He also assisted James Quibell on an excavation at the Monastery of Saint Epiphanius, and published Coptic texts from the site.

Thompson was a lecturer and from 1930 a Fellow at University College London. He was chairman of the Golders Green Crematorium. The Sir Herbert Thompson Professor of Egyptology chair is established in his name at Cambridge University.

Thompson died on 26 May 1944 in Bath.

== See also ==
- List of Egyptologists

Baronetage of the United Kingdom
Preceded by Henry Thompson	Baronet (of Wimpole Street); 1904–1944	Extinct
