= Raymond and Agnes =

Raymond and Agnes is an opera in 3 (originally 4) acts by the composer Edward Loder to an English libretto by Edward Fitzball. It is very loosely based on elements from Matthew Lewis's classic Gothic novel, The Monk (1796) and also includes elements of Lewis's The Castle Spectre (1797). The opera's plot contains elements of love and revenge, brigandry, incarceration, a shooting match and the supernatural. The opera is considered to be among the most important serious operas of the British Victorian era.

The opera was first performed on 14 August 1855 at the Theatre Royal, Manchester. It was revived at St James's Theatre, London, in June 1859. A more recent revival in revised form was at Cambridge Arts Theatre in 1966.

== Conception and Performance History ==
Raymond and Agnes was the third major opera by Edward Loder, following his early Nourjahad (1834) and the more mature The Night Dancers (1846), and it was musically much the most ambitious. The first hint of what may have been Raymond and Agnes can be found in a statement in London's theatrical weekly The Era of 18 August 1850 that, "A new opera by Mr Edward Loder ... is about to be produced in the principal theatre at Brunswick." Nothing became of that, and around the same time a change of policy at London's Princess's Theatre forced Loder to move from his position as musical director there, where he had conducted many operas including The Night Dancers during the 1840s.

Loder found a new position as musical director at Manchester's Theatre Royal. However, ambitious new native operas were not the usual fare there, and a production of Raymond and Agnes announced for a major opera season in 1854 failed to materialise. However, in August 1855 it finally reached the stage for five performances at the end of a season of otherwise established operas and less ambitious fare, given by an opera company led by American bass Henri Drayton and his soprano wife Susanna Lowe.

Local critics reported an enthusiastic audience reception, though the Manchester correspondent of The Musical World (25 August 1855) expressed a somewhat modified opinion, being particularly hard on the libretto: "Loder's new opera is not as happy an inspiration as his Night Dancers. He has not been so fortunate in his libretto. The houses during its five nights' performance were but indifferent--pit alone excepted--which was full every night. The music is far better than the story, and was very well received.... There are some very striking and dramatic scenes in the opera, in spite of its gloomy and incoherent plot, which Loder has used to great advantage. There is a trio, a quintet--and one or two finales--especially the taking and dashing finale to the first act, which is nightly encored."

The work was rated highly enough for a further two performances later the same month, after which Loder left Manchester to return to London. By the time Raymond and Agnes finally reached the London stage in June 1859 Loder was too ill to conduct (though he took a curtain call), and the duty fell to his cousin George Loder. Moreover, the staging was not at one of London's major opera houses, but at the less well-appointed St James's Theatre. The production was organised by Augustus Braham, son of celebrated tenor John Braham, whose musical director Edward Loder had been at the St James's Theatre back in 1837. The opera was part of an evening's entertainment that also included a pair of Spanish ballets.

Opinions of the opera echoed those in Manchester. For instance, The Daily News (13 June 1859) opined that, "Raymond and Agnes is not by any means equal to The Night Dancers, and its inferiority is owing to the weakness of the subject and its dramatic treatment.... In this new opera the plot and incidents are so stale, flat, and insipid, as to paralyse the most active imagination, and we are only surprised that the music of Raymond and Agnes is as good as it is." The paper described the performance as "respectable" and reported "a very full house" and "great applause". In the event, the opera failed to survive competition from the major opera houses and was removed from the bill within a fortnight.

Fortunately the London production ensured publication of the opera in vocal score form, and over a hundred years later, in 1963, Nicholas Temperley, an assistant lecturer in music and fellow of Clare College, Cambridge, acquired a copy. Struck by the quality of the music, he discovered that the manuscript full score was preserved in the Library of Congress, and his determination that the music should be heard led to him staging the opera in Cambridge in May 1966--albeit that, believing the original libretto lost, he reduced and rearranged the score to a new libretto. Critics shared his enthusiasm for the music, Peter Heyworth (The Observer, 9 May 1966) observing that "the score develops a sustained dramatic attack that is all too rare in the annals of British opera", Andrew Porter (The Financial Times, 19 May 1966) declaring the score "a mine of richly inventive music", and Stanley Sadie (Opera, July 1966) reporting that, "Loder's melodies have been echoing through my mind since the performance."

Apart from a couple of BBC broadcasts of excerpts from the 1966 version in 1966 and 1995, matters again rested for almost a further fifty years until a project to mark the bicentenary of Loder's birth and the sesquicentenary of his death led to the discovery of the original published libretto and the creation by Valerie Langfield of a new performing edition from the autograph full score. Excerpts were performed at a concert in Bath in October 2015, and enthusiasts raised funding for a full-scale recording in October 2017 with leading British singers conducted by Richard Bonynge.

== Roles ==
Role	Voice type	Première cast, 14 August 1855 (cond. Edward Loder)	Revival cast, 11 June 1859 (cond. George Loder)
Don Raymond, a young Spaniard	tenor	George Perren	George Perren
The Baron of Lindenberg	bass-baritone	Henri Drayton	Hamilton Braham
Lady Agnes, his ward	soprano	Susanna Lowe	Hermine Rudersdorff
Madelina, her foster-sister	mezzo-soprano	Miss Johnson	Susan Pyne
Ravella, a dumb woman	spoken role	Miss Jefferies	Madame Louise
Theodore, Raymond's valet	tenor	C. Horn	Charles Lyall
Francesco, the baron's valet	bass	Mr Bellhouse	James Henry Leffler
Antoni, an old brigand	baritone	Charles Guilmette	J. T. Haines
Roberto and Martini, his robber sons	baritone / tenor	Mr Asbury / Mr Thomas	G. C. Rowland/Charles Edwards
Landlord of the Golden Wolf	baritone	Mr Watson	Edward Connell

== Settings in the two versions ==
In 1855 the work was performed in four acts with eight scenes, viz:

- Act 1, Scene 1: An Ancient Hostelry, “The Golden Wolf”, the Convent of St Agnes in the distance.
- Act 1, Scene 2: A Small Antique Chapel in the Convent of St Agnes.
- Act 2: A Grand Hall in the Castle of Lindenberg.
- Act 3, Scene 1: Forest near the Castle.
- Act 3, Scene 2: A Robber’s Cave.
- Act 4, Scene 1: Interior of the Castle.
- Act 4, Scene 2: Chamber in the Castle.
- Act 4, Scene 3: Western Wing of the Castle and chapel of St Agnes (Moonlight).

In 1859 the opera was performed in three acts, with Act 3, Scene 1 (a solo scena for Antoni, played in Manchester by local favourite Charles Guilmette and missing from the autograph score) omitted and the remainder of Acts 3 and 4 combined into Act 3.

== Synopsis ==
Act 1, Scene 1. Raymond arrives at the 'Golden Wolf' with his valet Theodore. He is seeking Agnes, a young Andalusian lady whose guardian has locked her up in the nearby St Agnes Convent with the intention of marrying her and imprisoning her in his castle of Lindenberg. Theodore gets into conversation with Francesco, who reveals himself as valet to that very same Baron of Lindenberg who shortly intends to marry Agnes. Madelina, Agnes's foster-sister and maid at the Baron's castle, tells how the Castle of Lindenberg is haunted by the ghost of a young Prioress, whom the Baron of the time fell in love with at Lindenberg. When he became persistent in his attentions, she seized his dagger and stabbed herself through the heart. Now, at dead of night on All Hallows' Eve, the ghostly Spectre-Nun wanders through the castle dressed in white, with dagger in hand. Raymond forms a plan to elope with Agnes.

Act 1, Scene 2. In the antique Chapel of the Convent of St Agnes, Madelina informs Agnes of her impending marriage to the Baron. Raymond enters, disguised as the verger, and he and Agnes reaffirm their love. After they have left, the Baron arrives and reveals himself full of remorse for past events. When Agnes then appears, the Baron declares himself about to take her to Lindenberg, while Raymond vows to save her. The Baron leads Agnes to his carriage.

Act 2, Scene 1. Raymond arrives at the Castle of Lindenberg, and he and Agnes reaffirm their intention to elope. It is ten o'clock on All Hallows' Eve, the night when the ghost of the Nun does her midnight round. When Francesco and Madelina draw back the black curtains over the altar they reveal a portrait strangely like Agnes, causing the Baron to reflect on a lady he snatched in Madrid when he stabbed her husband to death. He sits lost in thought as Raymond enters. It seems that the Baron's carriage had been attacked by Antoni and his sons on the way to Lindenberg, and Raymond had come to their aid. Now the Baron wishes to reward him. However, to the Baron's fury, all Raymond wants is Agnes's hand. The Baron explains the curse that rests on his family until the last of the line marries the last of St Agnes's, who is none other than Agnes herself. Raymond in turn tells of his mother's abduction and his father's murder by brigands led by one Inigo. As they argue, the Baron draws his dagger. Raymond grabs it and finds on it the name 'Inigo'. He thereby recognises the Baron as his father's killer and his mother's abductor. As they fight, servants enter and force Raymond into a dungeon.

Act 2, Scene 2. It is almost time for the Spectre Nun to appear, and the assembled folk are huddled together in terror. A door in the gallery opens, and Agnes enters in white flowing veil, a lamp in one hand and a dagger in the other, scaring the company away. She then lifts her veil and kneels before the portrait, begging forgiveness for impersonating her saintly predecessor. When Madelina and Theodore appear, the latter obeys Agnes's demand to unbolt the dungeon door, thus freeing Raymond, who embraces Agnes anew. However, the main door to the castle is locked and the key missing. The Baron enters, sleep-walking, with a sword in his hand and uttering the name of Ferdinand, Raymond's father. Suddenly he turns and, as the clock strikes twelve, he sees Agnes dressed as the Nun in the painting. Believing she is indeed the Spectre Nun, he produces the key and demands the main doors be opened for her. Too late he discovers that Raymond and Agnes have crossed the drawbridge, with Theodore following.

Act 3, Scene 1 (later omitted). On a stormy night in a forest near the castle, Antoni reflects on how he will soon reveal to the Baron a secret concerning the dumb woman Ravella.

Act 3, Scene 2 (later Act 3, Scene 1). In the cave of Antoni and his sons, the dumb Ravella is spinning, while Martini and Roberto play dice. Antoni enters and confides to his sons that the stranger they attacked the previous evening was the Baron of Lindenberg and none other than Inigo, their old bandit chief in Andalusia. When he looks out of the cave, Antoni quickly disguises himself as a hermit with a long white beard and motions to Ravella to open the entrance to the cave. Raymond enters, bearing Agnes in his arms and with Theodore in attendance. Gazing at Raymond, Ravella totters back in amazement, while the disguised Antoni, recognising Raymond as the Baron's rescuer, welcomes him and the exhausted Agnes. However, Theodore in turn recognises Antoni's voice and snatches off the false beard. Antoni blows his whistle, whereupon bandits rush in. In the ensuing confusion Ravella discovers a dropped miniature, which she shows to Antoni, who realises that Raymond is Fernando's son and orders his release. As Raymond rushes to Agnes, the Baron arrives with soldiers, who lead Raymond away.

Act 4, Scene 1 (later Act 3, Scene 2). Inside the castle, Antoni, now disguised as a monk begging charity, vows revenge on the Baron for renouncing him years before. Brought in by guards, Raymond envisages his own doom, while the Baron exultantly announces that he will take Agnes to the chapel within the hour. However, Antoni reveals himself as the Baron's recent assailant in the forest and the one-time assistant of Inigo. He recalls how he carried off the Baron's lady-love, Ravella, who was thereupon struck dumb. The Baron silences him by offering a thousand ducats for Antoni to shoot dead the man who now stands in the Baron's way. The Baron will place the gold by a statue in the chapel, and Antoni will shoot the man leaving the castle with a lady on his arm.

Act 4, Scene 2 (later Act 3, Scene 3). In a chamber of the castle, Agnes expresses anew her love for Raymond. Suddenly she sinks onto a couch. The figure of the Nun is seen to bend over and bless her, after which a chorus of Spectre Nuns kneels at an illuminated altar at which Raymond and Agnes are being united. As the vision fades, Agnes rises from the couch. Madelina enters with Raymond and Theodore to advise that, in a fit of generosity, the Baron has declared that the four of them can leave the castle. They vow to depart for Madrid without delay.

Act 4, Scene 3 (later Act 3, Scene 4). At nightfall in a wing of the castle, just outside the chapel, the Baron leaves the gold for Antoni. However, at that point Ravella enters and is grabbed by the arm by the Baron. Obeying his instruction to shoot a man with a lady on his arm, Antoni fires and hits the Baron. All rush in, and Ravella, recovering her speech, reveals herself as Raymond's long-lost mother. As the Baron dies, begging forgiveness, Raymond and Agnes express their joy.

== Recording ==
A recording, with Richard Bonynge conducting the Royal Ballet Sinfonia and Restrospect Opera Chorus, was released by Retrospect Opera in 2018. The cast includes Majella Cullagh as Agnes, Mark Milhofer as Raymond, Andrew Greenan as the Baron, Carolyn Dobbin as Madelina, Alessandro Fisher as Theodore and Quentin Hayes as Antoni.
