= Henry Watkins (priest) =

- Born: Henry William Watkins; January 19, 1844
- Died: August 31, 1922 (aged 78); Brighton
- Occupations: Anglican priest, academic and author

Henry William Watkins (19 January 1844 – 31 August 1922) was an Anglican priest, academic and author.

Born in Abergavenny on 19 January 1844, he was educated at King's College London and Balliol College, Oxford. He was ordained in 1870, and his first post was as a curate at St Nicholas, Pluckley. He was later Vicar of Holy Trinity, Much Wenlock. He was a censor, tutor and lecturer in Greek Testament at King's College London from 1875 and Professor of Logic and Moral Philosophy from 1877. In 1879, he became Warden of St Augustine's College, Canterbury, then held the three archdeaconries of the Diocese of Durham in quick succession: Archdeacon of Northumberland, 1880 – June 1882; Archdeacon of Auckland, June–November 1882; and Archdeacon of Durham, November 1882 – 1922. He was Professor of Hebrew at Durham University, retiring in 1920; and the Bampton Lecturer at Oxford, in 1890.

== Family life ==
Henry was married to Helen (Edith) Thompson (1860–1930), the daughter of Sir Henry Thompson, 1st Baronet, and his wife Lady Kate Thompson, née Loder. They had three daughters.

- Dorothy (Kate Gwyllyam), 1885–1961, who married John Edwards-Moss (1882–1958) and had two sons
- (Helen) Margaret (Gwyllyam), b. 1886
- (Gwendolen) Edith (Gwyllyam), 1895–1961

Henry died at Brighton on 31 August 1922.

== Publications ==
- Modern Criticism Considered in Its Relation to the Fourth Gospel (1890, Brampton Lectures)
