= George Loder =

English conductor and composer (1816–1868)

George Loder (1816 – 15 July 1868) was an English conductor, and composer of orchestral music, operas and songs. During his career he lived in England, America and Australia; he conducted the first U.S. performance of Beethoven's Symphony No. 9.

== Life ==
George Patrick Henry Loder was born in Bath, Somerset in 1816, son of George Loder, a flautist, and wife Mary Cook, who had married at St James, Bath, Somerset, on 18 December 1815. Loder was baptized in the Chapel of St Mary, Walcot, Bath, on 14 November 1816. His sister was the pianist and composer Kate Loder, and his uncle, the violinist John David Loder, was father of the composer Edward Loder. His mother, Mary, died in 1821. His father remarried two years later to Frances Kirkham.

In 1836 he visited America, living for some years in Baltimore, and in 1844 he was principal of the New York Vocal Institute, and member of the Philharmonic and Vocal Societies, which he had helped to establish there. He played the double-bass in the Philharmonic Society for five seasons, and sometimes conducted the orchestra. On 20 May 1846 Loder conducted the orchestra in the first U.S. performance of Beethoven's Symphony No. 9.

He conducted a performance of his overture Marmion at a concert of the Philharmonic Society at the Apollo, which was reviewed: "The composition is one of more than ordinary excellence, and if it is not distinguished by originality of ideas, it certainly deserves the highest encomiums for the excellence of its instrumentation."

About 1856 Loder went to Adelaide, South Australia, with the soprano Anna Bishop, and remained in Australia as conductor of William Saurin Lyster's opera troupe.

In 1859 he was again practising his profession, as organist, vocalist, conductor, and composer, in London. On 11 June of that year he conducted a revival of Edward Loder's opera Raymond and Agnes. In 1861 he published The Pets of the Parterre, a comic operetta, which had been produced at the Lyceum Theatre, and in 1862 The Old House at Home, a musical entertainment.

Loder paid a second visit to Australia, and died after a long illness in Adelaide on 15 July 1868.

== Compositions ==
Loder's music became more popular in America than in his own country. The New York Glee Book of 1844 contains several of his original part songs; it was reprinted several times from 1850–1855, and was republished as The Philadelphia and New York Glee Book in 1864. He published The Middle Voice, 12 solfeggi, in London in 1860, and various separate songs by him were published in England and America.
