= George Perren =

English singer

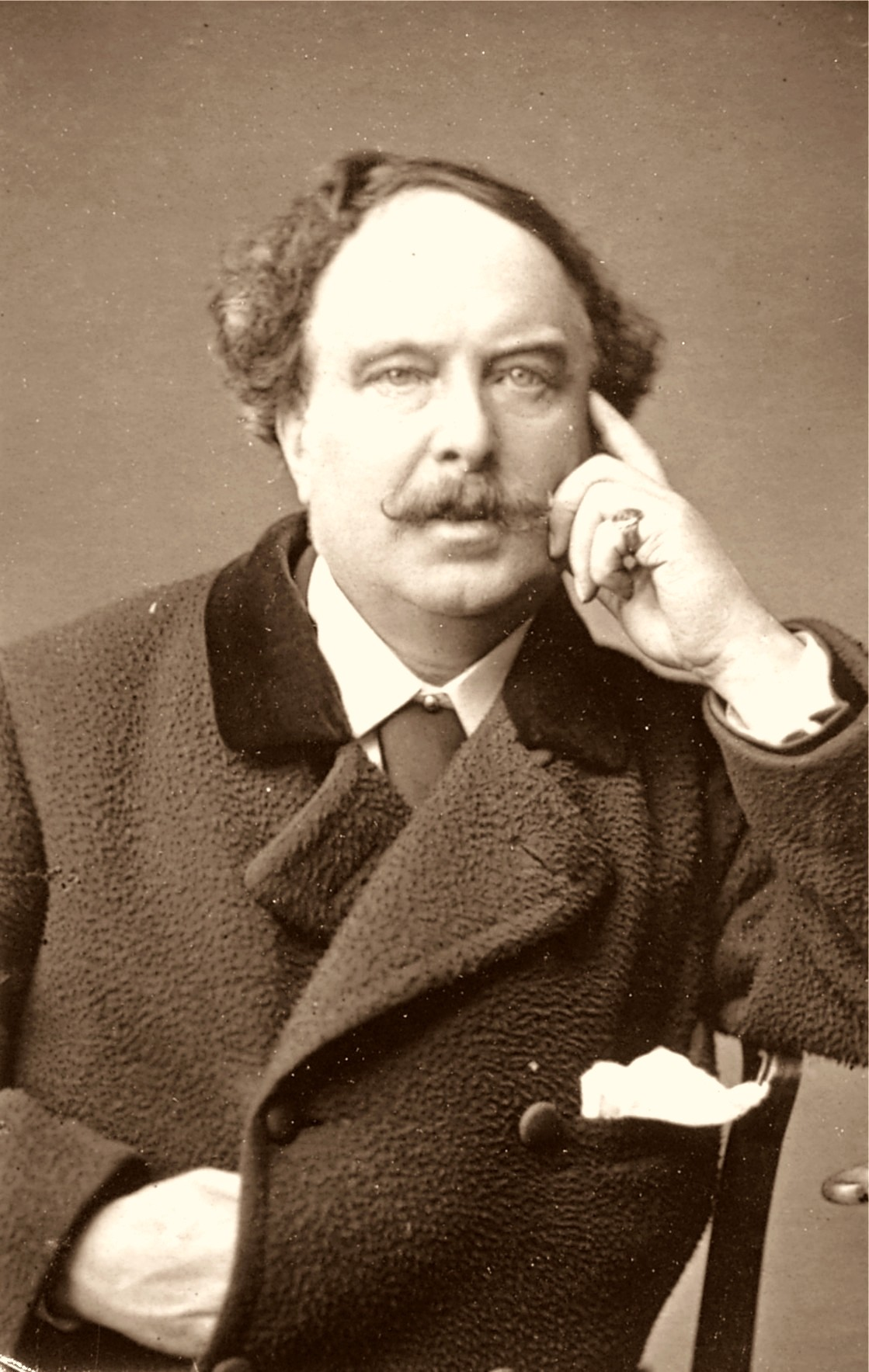
George Perren

George Perren (1827 – 7 April 1909) was an English tenor active in both concert and opera. He was born in Camberwell, a district of London. After concert appearances in the provinces he studied in Milan with Lamperti and on his return to England made his debut in The Surrey Theatre on 28 May 1855 in Faust and Marguerite by Meyer Lutz. For several years he sang in the Italian Opera Company at Her Majesty's Theatre. He sang in the premiere of Edward Loder's Raymond and Agnes at the Theatre Royal, Manchester (14 April 1855) and in the premiere of George Alexander McFarren's opera She Stoops to Conquer at the Drury Lane Theatre (11 February 1864). Perren was also popular as a ballad singer and composed several works in that genre. He retired from the stage in the 1880s and died in Hove, Sussex on 7 April 1909.
