= Sir Henry Thompson, 1st Baronet =

British surgeon and polymath (1820–1904)

Sir Henry Thompson Bt FRCS
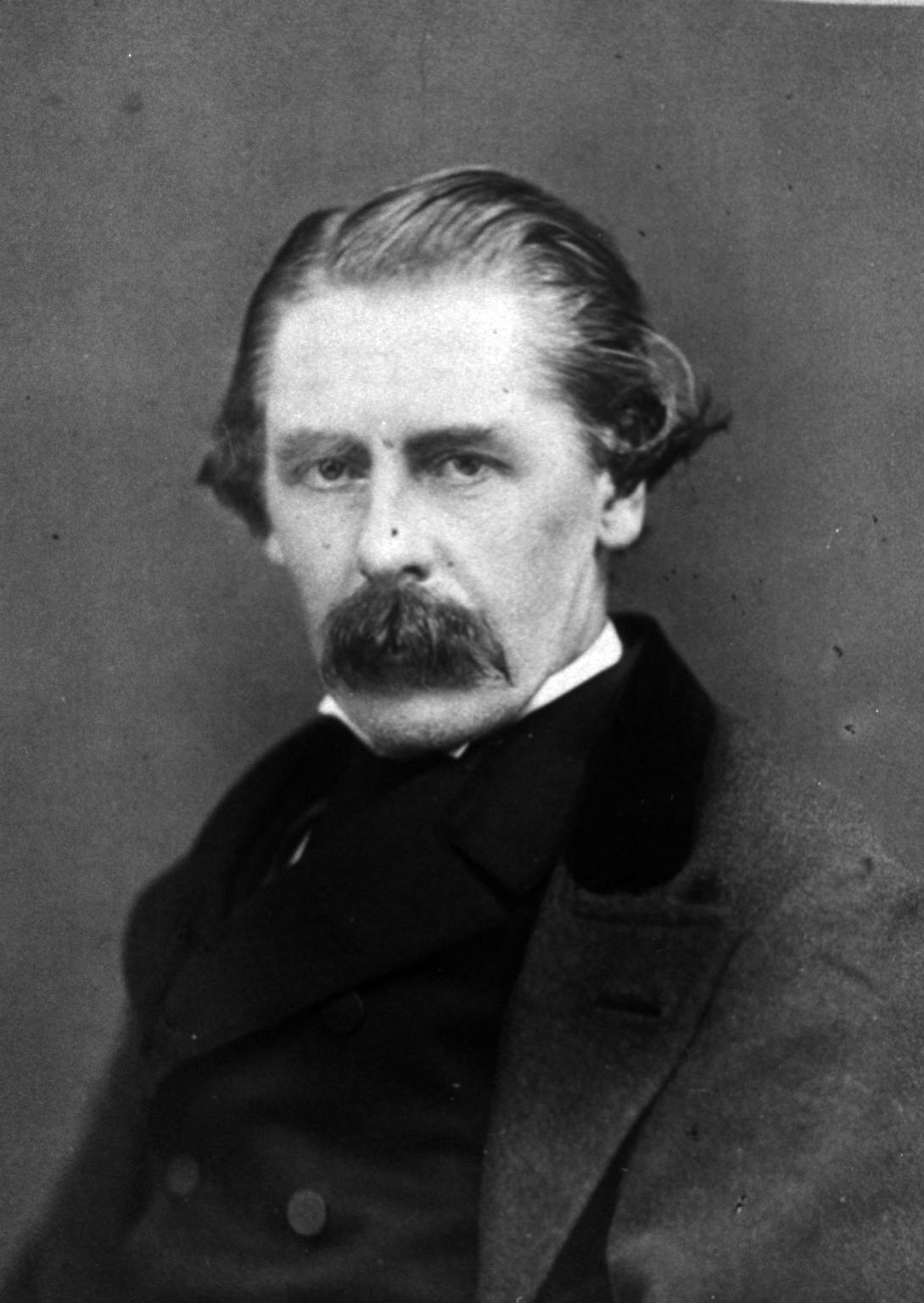
- Thompson before 1873
- Born: 6 August 1820; Framlingham, Suffolk, England
- Died: 18 April 1904 (aged 83); London, England
- Occupations: Surgeon, polymath

Sir Henry Thompson, 1st Baronet, FRCS (6 August 1820 – 18 April 1904) was a British surgeon and polymath. His interest was particularly in the surgery of the genito-urinary tract.

== Medical career ==
Thompson was born at Framlingham, Suffolk. His father wished him to enter business, but he was eventually (by 1848) able to enrol in the Medical School of University College London. He obtained his medical degree in 1851 with the highest honours in anatomy and surgery and set up a practice at 35 Wimpole Street in London, where he lived and worked until his death in 1904.

In 1853 he was appointed assistant surgeon at University College Hospital, becoming full surgeon in 1863, professor of clinical surgery in 1866, and consulting surgeon in 1874. In 1884 he became professor of surgery and pathology in the Royal College of Surgeons. Specializing in surgery of the genito-urinary tract, and in particular in that of the bladder, he studied in Paris under Jean Civiale, who in the first quarter of the 19th century had developed a procedure to crush a stone within the human bladder and who had invented an instrument for this minimally invasive surgery.

After his return from Paris, Thompson soon acquired a reputation as a skilful surgeon in that class of disease.

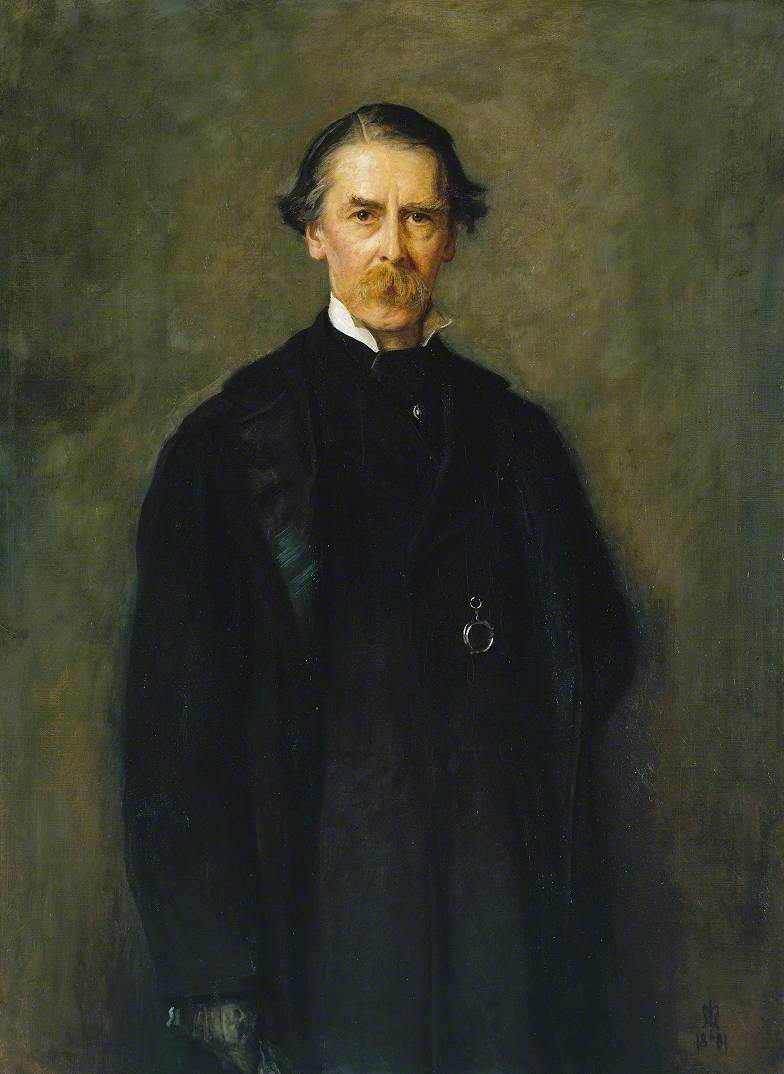
Thompson in an 1881 portrait by John Everett Millais

In 1863, when King Leopold I of Belgium was suffering from kidney stones, Thompson was called to Brussels to consult in the case, and after some difficulties was allowed to perform the operation of lithotripsy. It was successful, and in recognition of his skill Thompson was appointed surgeon-extraordinary to the King, an appointment which was continued by Leopold II. Nearly ten years later Thompson carried out a similar operation on the former Emperor Napoléon III; however, the Emperor died four days after, not from the surgical procedure, as was proved by the post-mortem examination, but from uremia.

In 1874 Thompson helped in founding the Cremation Society of Great Britain, of which he was the first president; he also did much toward the removal of the legal restrictions on cremation. He denounced the prevailing methods of death certification in Great Britain; and in 1892 a select committee was appointed to inquire into the matter; its report, published the following year, was generally in line with his thinking. Woking Crematorium finally became the first of its kind in the UK. Thompson's last public duty for the society, in 1903, was to open Birmingham Crematorium, the country's ninth. Thompson died in April 1904 aged 83; his body was cremated at Golders Green Crematorium, the first in London, which he had opened in 1902.

== Personal life ==
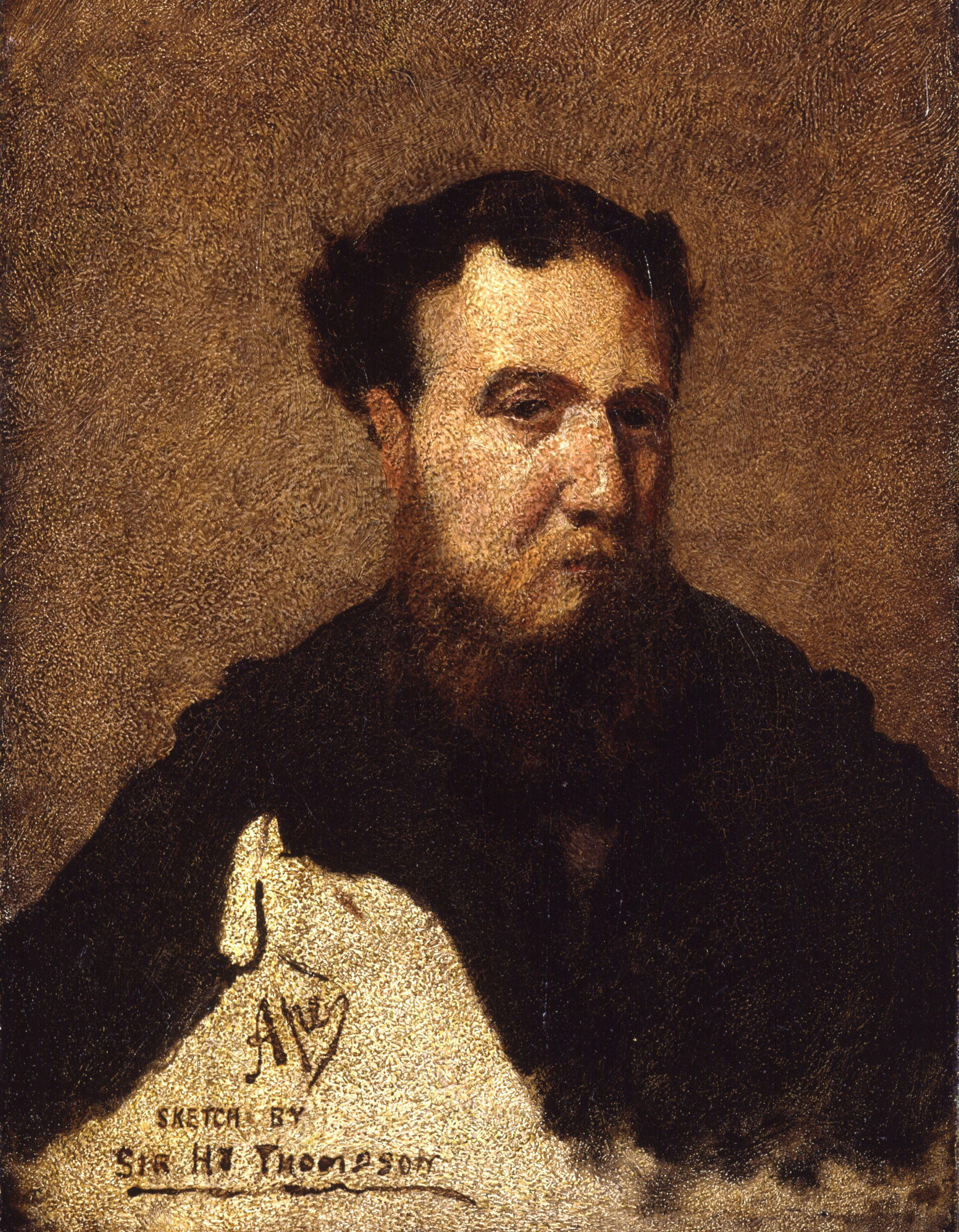
Thompson's portrait of Carlo Pellegrini

Thompson was also an artist, producing sketches and paintings, some of which were hung at the Royal Academy of Arts and in the Paris Salon. About 1870 he began to collect Chinese porcelain, in particular of old blue and white Nanking; in time his collection became so large that he could no longer find room for it, and most of it was sold. A catalogue of it, illustrated by himself and James Whistler, was published in 1878.

He was also interested in astronomy, and for a time maintained a private observatory in his house at Molesey. He presented the Royal Greenwich Observatory several instruments, including a photographic heliograph of 9-inch aperture; a 30-inch reflecting telescope, and a large refracting telescope with a 26-inch object glass (of 22 feet focal length). The offer of the last instrument was made in 1894. Its manufacture was undertaken by Sir Howard Grubb of Dublin, and its erection was completed in 1897. Both the 30-inch reflecting telescope and the 26-inch refracting telescope are today installed at the Royal Greenwich Observatory's old research site at Herstmonceux Castle.

Sir Henry Thompson, knighted in 1867, received a baronetcy in 1899, in connection with his telescope gifts to the National Observatory.

In 1851 he married Kate Loder, a pianist, who was stricken with paralysis after 1871.

On his death, his only son, Herbert, a barrister and Egyptologist, succeeded to the baronetcy. Of his two daughters, the elder Kate Mary Margaret Thompson (1856–1942) was the author of a valuable Handbook to the Public Picture Galleries of Europe, first published in 1877. She married Henry William Watkins, Archdeacon of Durham. The younger daughter, Helen Edith Thompson (1860–1930), married the Ven. Henry Lawe Corry Vully de Candole. They had two sons, the youngest was the World War I poet Alec de Candole

Thompson believed in an impersonal God. In his 1903 essay "The Unknown God?", he promoted the idea that an eternal source of energy exists in the universe that is beneficent and intelligent but not personal. He argued that all the major religions which are regarded as "divinely" inspired are unsubstantiated and unsupported by evidence.

== Debate over vegetarianism ==
Thompson was incorrectly cited and misquoted by vegetarians as being a supporter of vegetarianism. For example, he is cited as supporting a vegetarian diet in Gandhi's essay The Superiority of Vegetarianism. Thompson rejected excessive meat consumption and promoted a "lighter" diet but was not a vegetarian. He was involved in a debate over vegetarianism which led to controversy in the The Nineteenth Century magazine.

Thompson authored two articles on vegetarianism, in 1898. Thompson stated that those that consume only from the vegetable kingdom can be called "vegetarians", not those that consume animal products such as dairy and eggs. Josiah Oldfield responded to this by stating that eggs and milk "may rightly form an integral part of a vegetarian dietary" and vegetarianism does not equate to only vegetable eating.

== Bibliography ==
The Royal College of Surgeons in 1852 awarded Thompson the Jacksonian Prize for an essay on the Pathology and Treatment of Stricture of the Urethra (on stenosis of the urethra, a common condition in the times of gonorrhea and other sexually transmitted diseases); and again in 1860 for his essay on the Health and Morbid Anatomy of the Prostate Gland. These two memoirs belong to urology, his medical speciality. Besides devising operative improvements, he wrote books and papers dealing with them, including:

- Practical Lithotomy and Lithotrity,
- Tumours of the Bladder,
- Suprapubic Lithotomy, and
- Preventive Treatment of Calculus Disease,
- Moderate Drinking, 1877.
- Food and Feeding, 1879.
- Clinical Lectures on Diseases of the Urinary Organs, 1882.
- The Pathology and Treatment of Stricture of the Urethra and Urinary Fistulae, 1885.
- 'Why Vegetarian?', 1898.
- 'Why Vegetarian'?: A Reply to Critics, 1898.
- Diet in Relation to Age & Activity, 1901.
- "The Unknown God?": An Essay, 1903

He produced two successful novels, Charley Kingston's Aunt (1885) and All But (1886).

== Sources ==
- "Thompson, Sir Henry, Bart (1820 - 1904)". Plarr's Lives of the Fellows Online.

Baronetage of the United Kingdom
New creation	Baronet (of Wimpole Street); 1899–1904	Succeeded by Henry Francis Herbert Thompson
