= Joseph Dando =

Joseph Dando (full name Joseph Haydon Bourne Dando; 11 May 1806 – 9 May 1894) was an English violinist and viola player. He introduced the first public concerts of chamber music in England.

== Early career ==
Dando was born in Somers Town, London in 1806. He studied the violin with his uncle Gaetano Brandi. He was a pupil of Nicolas Mori for about seven years from 1819.

He joined the Philharmonic Orchestra in 1831 where he played until 1855. For many years, he led the orchestras of the Classical Harmonists and Choral Harmonists societies in London. In 1832 he played in the first performance in England of Beethoven's Fidelio.

He was the first to introduce public concerts in England consisting entirely of chamber music: on 23 September 1835, a benefit concert took place at the Horn Tavern, Doctor's Commons, in which Dando led an ensemble. It was successful, and more concerts followed. One such concert led by Dando, of chamber music by Onslow, Spohr, Beethoven and Corelli, was reviewed: "These chamber concerts will prove of essential benefit to the cause of sterling music. We cannot but recognise the promise of better days, when we witness... a large company attentively listening for a whole evening to an unvaried succession of instrumental compositions."

== String quartet ==
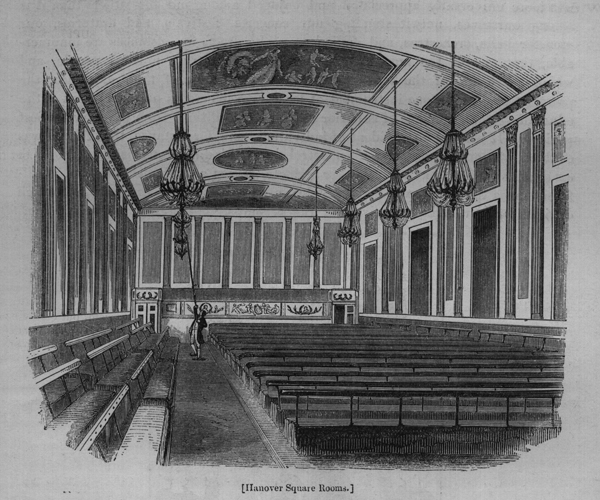
The interior of the Hanover Square Rooms in 1844

Dando assembled a string quartet consisting of Henry Blagrove and Henry Gattie (violins), Charles Lucas (cello) and himself playing viola: their first concert was on 17 March 1836 at the Hanover Square Rooms, and they continued for seven seasons until 1842, when Blagrove left the group.

The quartet was then led by Dando, with John Fawcett Loder playing viola and other members as before: they gave concerts at Crosby Hall, London until Gattie and Loder died in 1853. A reviewer of one of these concerts wrote: "Mr. Dando officiated as first violin, throughout the evening, and, in this capacity, we doubt whether he has many superiors among the violinists of all Europe. He is in all respects, an accomplished an admirable quartet player, with a feeling for his task which few possess."

The quartet led by Dando gave the first English performances of Haydn's The Seven Last Words (in 1843), Mendelssohn's String Quartet Op. 44 No. 3 and Schumann's String Quartet in A minor.

Dando was a member of the Bach Society set up by William Sterndale Bennett to revive the St Matthew Passion and played in the orchestra in 1858.

A concert in Willis's Rooms in which he played Beethoven's Violin Sonata Op. 96 in G major, accompanied by the pianist Lindsay Sloper, was reviewed: "Beethoven's grand sonata was finely played.... Mr. Dando is a powerful exposito of the large school of violin compositions. He is a thoroughly classic performer, surpassed by few in his interpretation of such music as that of Mozart, Beethoven, Mendelssohn and Spohr."

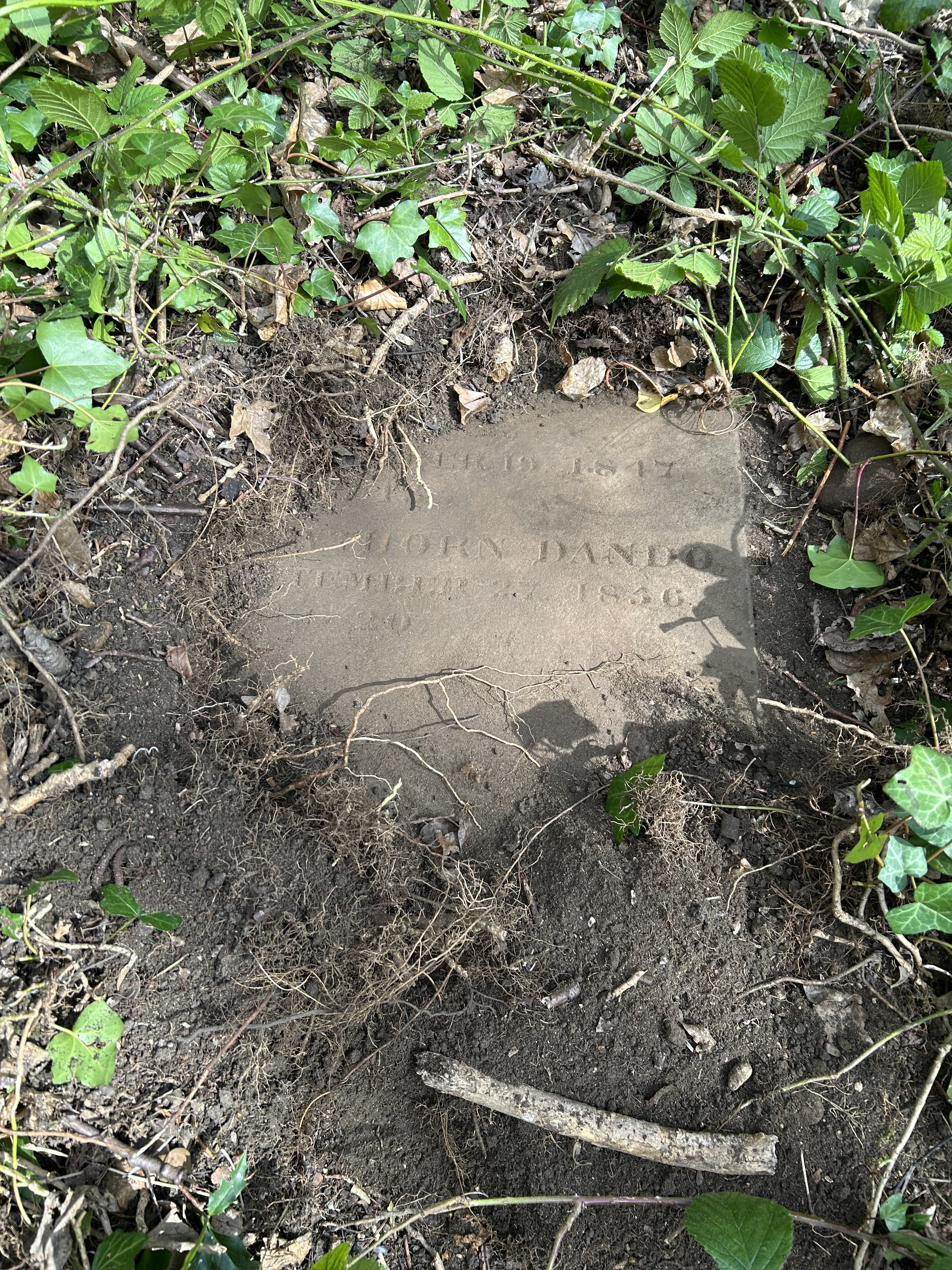
Grave of Joseph Dando in Highgate Cemetery

== Later years ==
After the quartet was disbanded Dando continued to play in orchestras. In the 1870s he became unable to play, and from 1875 he was music master at Charterhouse School in Godalming. He remained there until a short time before his death in 1894 in Godalming. He was buried on the western side of Highgate Cemetery.
