= Eric Armar Vully de Candole =

British civil servant

Eric Armar Vully de Candole CMG CBE
- Born: 14 September 1901; Phillak Hayle, Redruth, Cornwall, United Kingdom
- Died: 7 July 1989 (aged 87); Bournemouth, Dorset, United Kingdom
- Education: Worcester College, Oxford

Eric Armar Vully de Candole CMG CBE (14 September 1901 – 7 July 1989) was a British civil servant.

== Early life and education ==
Vully de Candole was born in Phillak Hayle, Redruth on 14 September 1901, the elder son, the middle child of Rev. Armar Corry Vully de Candole and Edith Hodgson.

He was educated at Colet Court, Aldenham School and Worcester College, Oxford.

== Career ==
On 3 August 1923 he sailed from Liverpool on HMS Leicestershire to Port Said to take up his diplomatic post in the Sudan. He was in the Sudan Political Service from 1923 to 1946, when he became Administrator of Cyrenaica and Somalia until 1951. He was Advisor to the King of Libya between 1951 and 1954. On 17 December 1953 he flew from Beirut to Paris.

=== Orders of chivalry ===
- Officer of the Order of the Nile (Egypt), 1934
- Commander of the Most Excellent Order of the British Empire (CBE), 1950
- Companion of the Most Distinguished Order of Saint Michael and Saint George (CMG), 1952
- Order of Istiqlal (Libya), 1954

== Family ==
On 7 September 1932 in St. Martin-in-the-fields, London, he married Marion Elizabeth "Betty" Pender née Roberts (died 4 March 1997), the daughter of Major Henry Constable Roberts. They had three children:

- John Armar Vully de Candole, MC, born 1 October 1933, married Lisa, 6 December 1958
- Charles Anthony Vully de Candole, born 20 December 1951, died 14 September 2001, aged 48
- Mark Andrew Vully de Candole, born 15 April 1953

EAVdeC died on 12 June 1989 in Bournemouth.

== Bibliography ==
- "The life and times of King Idris of Libya", published by Mohamed Ben Ghalbon, 1988

== Notes ==
- De Candole's entry in Who's Who
