= Henry de Candole (priest) =

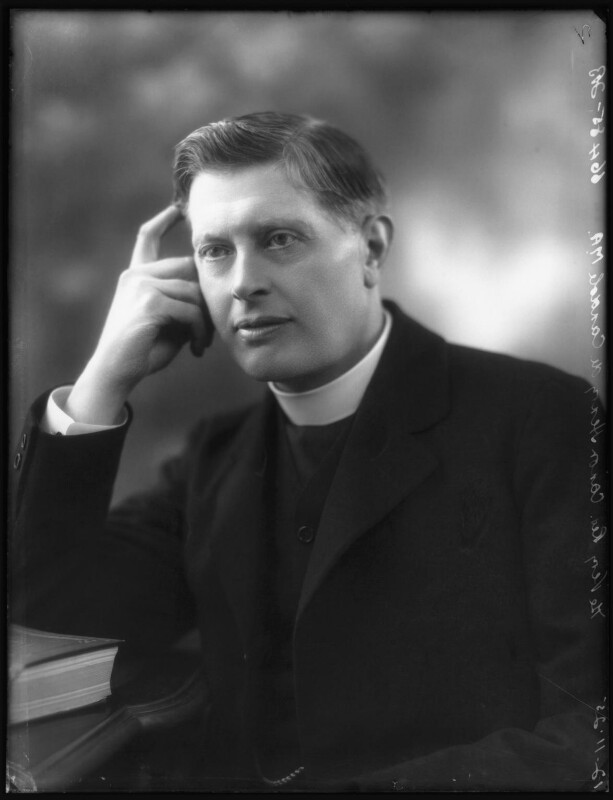
De Cabndole in 1925

Henry Lawe Corry Vully de Candole (17 December 1868, Bayswater – 15 December 1933) (usually known as Corry) was Dean of Bristol from 1926 until his death in 1933.

== Background ==
De Candole was born in Kensington on 17 February 1868, the son of Henry Sundius Vully de Candole (born 25 June 1841 in Bierlow, Yorkshire; died May 1877 in Barton Regis, Gloucestershire) and his wife, Emily Roe Lawe (born 1843 in India; died March 1899 in London). He had two brothers, who also went into the Church:

- Rev. Armar Corry Vully de Candole (13 June 1869 – 1941)
- Rev. James Alexander Corry Vully de Candole (25 May 1871 – 3 May 1917)

== Education ==
De Candole was educated at St Paul's and Christ's College, Cambridge, and ordained in 1891.

== Career ==
His first post was at Portman Chapel. He held incumbencies at St James’, Cheltenham, St Paul's, Ball's Pond, Holy Trinity, Cambridge and St John's, Smith Square, his last appointment before the Deanery. The history of the Liturgical Movement within the Church of England is inseparably interwoven with his life and work. An effective instrument in propagating and establishing the Liturgical Movement at Parish level was the "Parish and People" organisation, of which de Candole was a Founder.

== Family ==
In 1894 in Marylebone, de Candole was married to Helen (Edith) Thompson (1860–1930), the daughter of Sir Henry Thompson, 1st Baronet and Lady Kate Thompson, née Loder. They had two sons:

- Henry Handley Vully de Candole (1895–1971)
- Alexander ("Alec") Corry Vully de Candole (1897–1918), a war poet

He died on 15 December 1933, and was buried in Bristol Cathedral.

Church of England titles
Preceded by Edward Burroughs	Dean of Bristol; 1926 – 1933	Succeeded by Harry Blackburne
