= Bernhard Molique =

19th-century German violinist/composer

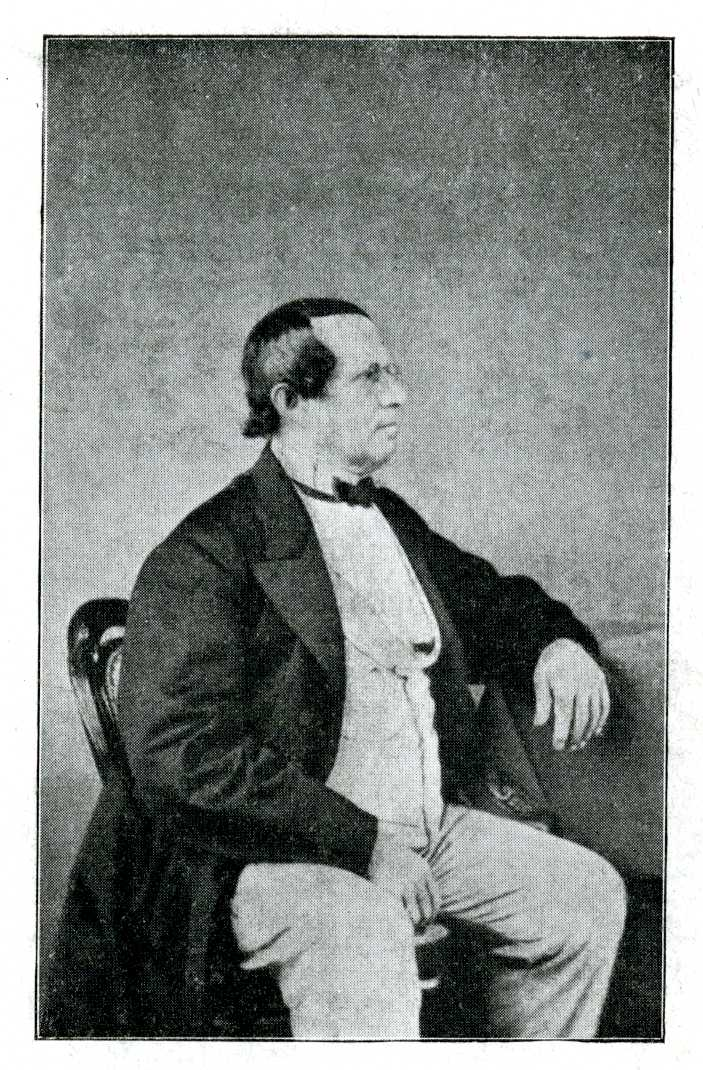
Bernhard Molique

Bernhard Molique (Wilhelm Bernhard Molique; 7 October 1802 – 10 May 1869) was a German violinist and composer.

== Biography ==
He was born in Nuremberg. His father was a musician and the boy studied various instruments, but finally devoted himself to the violin. In 1815, he received some lessons from Louis Spohr, and then studied the violin for two years at the Ludwig-Maximilians-Universität München under Pietro Rovelli.

== Career ==
In 1820, Molique succeeded Rovelli as court violinist in Munich and, after several successful tours, in 1826 he became music director at Stuttgart. His pupils there included the violinist Henry Blagrove; the violinist, conductor and composer Alfred Mellon; and the composer Jane Roeckel. Molique was well received on a visit to London when he played his own Piano Concerto No 5 on 14 May 1840. He visited England several other times before settling in London from 1849 until 1866. He died in Cannstatt in 1869.

== Compositions ==
As a composer, Molique was unapologetically self-taught. His music displays the influence of Beethoven, Mozart, Mendelssohn and, especially, Louis Spohr. The then radical developments represented by Berlioz (who publicly praised his violin playing) and the New German School (German: Neudeutschen Schule) left Molique untouched, however.

As well as the five piano concertos Molique wrote six violin concertos (the fifth especially admired by Joachim) and a popular Cello Concerto that was successfully played in Baden-Baden, by Léon Jacquard, conducted by Hector Berlioz, on August 27, 1860. He also wrote a Symphony (1837–42), eight string quartets, the Piano Trio op.27 (championed by Hans von Bülow) and the Concertina Concerto as well an oratorio Abraham (performed in England, 1861), two masses and many songs.

=== Selected Compositions ===
- Chamber music
  - String Quartets, Opp. 16 (in G) and 17 (the latter in C minor)
  - Three String Quartets, Op. 18 (published 1843)
  - First grand trio concertante for piano, violin and violoncello, Op. 27
  - Sixth String Quartet, Op. 28 in F minor
  - Quintet for flute, violin, violas, violoncello, Op. 35, D major
  - Seventh String Quartet in B♭ major Op. 42 (published 1854)
  - Eighth String Quartet, Op. 44 in A minor (published by Kistner of Leipzig by 1853)
  - Second Piano Trio, Op. 52 in F major (published 1858)
  - Sonata for Concertina and Piano, Op. 57 (1857)
  - Piano Quartet, Op. 71 in E♭ major (published 1870)
- Concertante works
  - Concertino in F minor for violin, Op. 1
  - Violin Concerto no. 1 in E major Op. 4 (published 1830)
  - Violin Concerto no. 2 in A major, Op. 9 (published 1833)
  - Violin Concerto no. 3 in D minor, Op. 10
  - Violin Concerto no. 4 in D major Op. 14 (published 1839)
  - Violin Concerto no. 5 in A minor, Op. 21 (published 1845)
  - Violin Concerto no. 6 in E minor Op. 30 (c. 1847?)
  - Cello Concerto in D, Op. 45 (published 1854)
  - Concertino for Oboe and Orchestra in G minor
  - Flute Concerto in D minor, Op. 69
  - Clarinet Concerto in F minor, 1824
  - 6 Flying leaves op. 50 (1856)
  - Serenade and Six characteristic pieces op. 61 (1859)
  - 6 Songs without words for concertina and harp
  - Concerto No. 1 in G op. 46 for concertina and string orchestra (1854)
  - Concerto No. 2 for concertina and string orchestra (1861)
- Oratorio
  - Abraham, Op. 65 (1860)
- Liturgical
  - Mass in F minor, op. 22.(published 1846.)

== Sources ==
- Gilman, D. C.; Peck, H. T.; Colby, F. M., eds. (1905). "Molique, Wilhelm Bernhard" . New International Encyclopedia (1st ed.). New York: Dodd, Mead.
