= Alec de Candole =

English poet

Alexander Corry Vully de Candole (usually known as Alec de Candole) (26 January 1897 – 3 September 1918), was a World War I poet.

"We set off for the Aubigny Communal Cemetery, where we were to visit the graves of Alexander de Candole and Hamish Mann. The focus today was to look at the work of those poets who were deeply troubled by the attitude of the Church towards the war. Most of us are familiar with Sassoon's biting satire directed at the Church, but I knew little of de Candole, who wrote a book entitled 'The Faith of a Subaltern: Essays on Religion and Life'. It was clear from the readings that had been selected for our anthologies that here was a highly intelligent and sensitive young man for whom the crusading spirit and systematic demonising of the enemy, promulgated by the Church, were totally abhorrent. One can only speculate what a young man of his intellectual calibre might have become, had he not been killed, at the age of 21, in a bombing raid towards the end of the war."

== Life ==
Alec was born in Cheltenham, the second son of the Ven. Henry Lawe Corry Vully de Candole and Helen (Edith) née Thompson, and the only sibling of Henry Handley Vully de Candole. He was offered a place at Cambridge, but postponed the offer to join the War effort. A Lieutenant in the Wiltshire Regiment, he was killed in action on 3 September 1918, and died at Bonningues at the age of 21.

Alec was educated at St Faith's, Cambridge; in 1908 he went to St Andrew's, Southborough (which was destroyed by fire on 8 February 1919). In 1910 he was awarded a Foundation Scholarship to Marlborough College, and in 1912 won a Senior Scholarship.

In December 1915, Alec won an Open Classical Exhibition Scholarship to Trinity College, Cambridge, which he postponed for the duration of the War currently being fought, his hope being to take Holy Orders.

== War Service ==
Upon leaving school, Alec joined up, and in April 1916 was sent to Cadet school in Oxford, after which he was commissioned into the 4th Battalion of the Wiltshire Regiment.

He went to France in April 1917. After a short leave in September 1917, Alec returned to France and was wounded on 28 October; he came back to England the following month, November 1917.

After some months on Salisbury Plain, he was attached to the 49th Machine Gun Corps, and was sent to Grantham in April 1918.

== Death ==
In July 1918 he left for France, where he was killed on the night of 3 September 1918, aged 21½. He now lies buried in grave No. IV A 8 at Aubigny-en-Artois, a village approximately 15 km north-west of Arras on the N39 road to St. Pol.

== Works ==
His poetical works were published by The Cambridge University Press in 1920, under the title "Poems". The poems in that volume are on-line at http://www.poemhunter.com/alec-de-candole/poems/ Also in that book (but these are not on that Website) are three other works, "An Arthurian Romance", "A Biblical Play" and "The Fall of Carthage". A

Alec also wrote a small (100-page) book entitled "The Faith of a Subaltern", which was published posthumously by the Cambridge University Press. This book is available as a .pdf file for download, or it can be read on-line, at:- https://archive.org/details/faithofsubaltern00decaiala

All his works mentioned above are on-line at http://www.spanglefish.com/alecdecandole, which also carries photographs.

He was mentioned and quoted in "A deep cry: First World War soldier-poets killed in France and Flanders" by Anne Powell; Sutton Pub., 1993; 470 pages.
