= Edward Fitzball =

English playwright

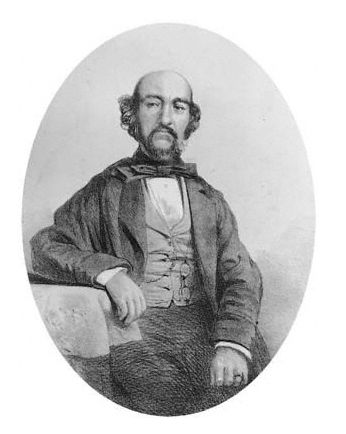
- Born: Edward Ball; 20 March 1793; Burwell, Cambridgeshire
- Died: 27 October 1873 (aged 80); Chatham
- Occupations: Playwright, Librettist, Songwriter
- Years active: 1809–1873

Edward Fitzball (20 March 1793 – 27 October 1873) was a popular English playwright, who specialised in melodrama. His real surname was Ball, and he was born at Burwell, Cambridgeshire.

Fitzball was educated in Newmarket, was apprenticed to a Norwich printer in 1809. He produced some dramatic pieces at the local theatre, and eventually the marked success of his Innkeeper of Abbeville, or The Ostler and the Robber (1820), together with the friendly acceptance of one of his pieces at the Surrey Theatre by Thomas John Dibdin, induced him to settle in London.

During the next twenty-five years, he produced a great number of plays, most of which were successful. He had a special talent for nautical drama. His Floating Beacon (Surrey Theatre, 19 April 1824) ran for 140 nights, and his Pilot (Adelphi, 1825) for 200 nights. He also produced a seminal play on The Flying Dutchman and wrote the libretto for Edward Loder's Raymond and Agnes. His greatest triumph in melodrama was perhaps Jonathan Bradford, or Murder at the Roadside Inn (Surrey Theatre, 12 June 1833). He was at one time stock dramatist and reader of plays at Covent Garden, and afterwards at Drury Lane. He had a considerable reputation as a songwriter and as a librettist in opera. He wrote the librettos for William Vincent Wallace's operas Maritana and Lurline.

The last years of his life were spent in retirement at Chatham, where he died at the age of 80.
