= Henry Blagrove (violinist) =

English violinist

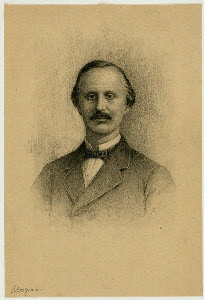

Background information
- Born: 20 October 1811; Nottingham
- Died: 15 December 1872 (aged 61) London
- Years active: 1830–1860

Henry Gamble Blagrove (20 October 1811, Nottingham - 15 December 1872, London) was a celebrated English violinist.

== Life ==
A child prodigy, he began studying the violin at the age of 4 and performing in public concerts at the age of 5.

In 1821 he studied with Spagnoletti, and two years later, on the opening of the Royal Academy of Music, he entered that institution, where he became the pupil of Dr. Crotch and F. Cramer. In 1824 Blagrove was awarded a silver medal for his violin-playing, and in 1830 he received the appointment of solo-violinist in the royal private band, a post he held until 1837.

Queen Adelaide took great interest in his career, and at her wish he went, in 1832, to Cassel, where he spent two years studying with Spohr. Subsequently, he travelled on the continent for some time, playing with great success at Vienna and elsewhere. In 1833–4 he pursued further studies in Germany with Louis Spohr in Kassel, and Bernhard Molique in Stuttgart. In 1836 he founded the Quartett Concerts in the Hanover Square Rooms, with Joseph Dando, Henry Gattie, Charles Lucas and William Sterndale Bennett and they persisted into the Victorian era, spreading chamber music as a taste.

He served as concertmaster and soloist with the Royal Philharmonic Society (appointed 1834) and the orchestra at the Royal Opera House, Covent Garden for several decades. He was also a frequent guest soloist or concertmaster with orchestras in England's provincial music festivals from the 1830s through the 1860s.

The last years of Blagrove's life were spent battling a variety of illnesses. He died of pneumonia.

== Family ==
On 17 Aug. 1841 Blagrove married Etheldred, daughter of Mr. Henry Combe, by whom he had three children.
