= Kate Loder =

English composer and pianist (1825–1904)

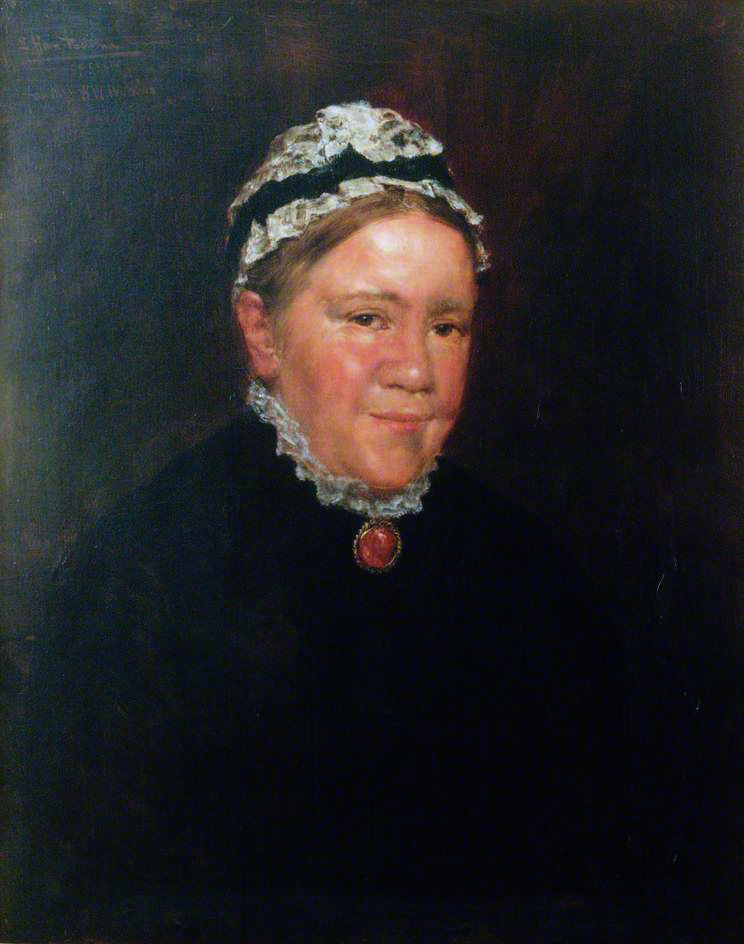
Kate Loder, Lady Thompson

Kate Fanny Loder, later Lady Thompson, (21 August 1825 – 30 August 1904) was an English composer and pianist.

== Biography ==
=== Ancestry ===
Kate Loder was born on 21 August 1825, on Bathwick Street, Bathwick, within Bath, Somerset where the Loder family were prominent musicians. Her father was the flautist George Loder. According to Grove, her mother was a piano teacher born Fanny Philpot, who was the sister of the pianist Lucy Anderson. However, genealogical research suggests Kate's mother was Frances Elizabeth Mary Kirkham (1802–50), daughter of Thomas Bulman Kirkham (1778–1845) and Marianne Beville Moore (c.1781 – 1810). Frances Kirkham's step-mother was Jane Harriett Philpot (1802–63), second wife to Thomas Bulman Kirkham and sister of the Lucy Philpot who married the violinist George Frederick Anderson, becoming Lucy Anderson. Kate was also the sister of conductor and composer George Loder, and the cousin of composer Edward Loder.

=== Royal Academy of Music ===
Kate Loder studied at the Royal Academy of Music in London. Her performance of Mendelssohn's G minor piano concerto at the Hanover-square Rooms on 27 May 1843, when she was aged 17, may have been her public debut. The following year, in 1844, aged just 18, she became the first female professor of harmony at the Royal Academy.

=== Marriage ===
On 16 December 1851 at St Marylebone Church, Westminster, she married the eminent surgeon Henry Thompson (Kt. 1867. Bt. 1899, 'of Wimpole Street'). After her marriage she gradually gave up her public performing career, the last public appearance being in March 1854. However, she remained active in music as a composer and professor at the Royal Academy of Music. Among her many pupils was Sarah Louisa Kilpack who nowadays is better known as an artist.

Kate Loder had three children from her marriage:

- Kate Mary Margaret Thompson (1856–1942), author of Handbook to the Public Picture Galleries of Europe (1877); married Rev. Henry William Watkins.
- Henry Francis Herbert Thompson (1859–1944), a barrister and later an Egyptologist lecturing at University College, London.
- Helen Edith Thompson (1860–1930), married the Rev. Henry de Candole.

From 1871 onwards she suffered increasing Infirmity, described as paralysis.

=== Death ===
Kate Loder died on 30 August 1904 at Headley Rectory, Headley, Surrey.

=== The Brahms Requiem ===
On 10 July 1871, the first British performance of the German Requiem of Johannes Brahms took place privately at Loder's home, 35 Wimpole Street, London. It was performed using a version for piano duet accompaniment which became known as the "London Version" (German: Londoner Fassnung) of the Requiem. Brahms based it on an 1866 arrangement for piano of his first, six-movement version of the Requiem. The pianists were Kate Loder and Cipriani Potter (who was then 79 years old; he died that September).

== Works ==
Selected works include:

=== Chamber ===
- String quartet in G minor (1846)
- Sonata for violin and piano (1847)
- String quartet in E minor (1847)
- Piano trio (1886)

=== Opera ===
- L'elisir d'amore (1855)

=== Orchestral ===
- Overture (1844)

=== Organ ===
- Six Easy Voluntaries. Set 1. (London: Novello, 1889)
- Six Easy Voluntaries. Set 2. (London: Novello, 1891) – "for the most part fresh and genial in character ... somewhat suggestive of Spohr in the numerous chromatic progressions."

=== Piano ===
- Twelve studies (1852)
- Three romances (1853)
- Pensée fugitive (1854)
- En Avant galop (1863)
- Three Duets (1869)
- Mazurka in A minor (1899)
- Scherzo (1899)

=== Songs ===
- My faint spirit (1854), text by Shelley
- Queen Mary's Song (nd), text by Tennyson
