= Cipriani Potter =

English musician (1792–1871)

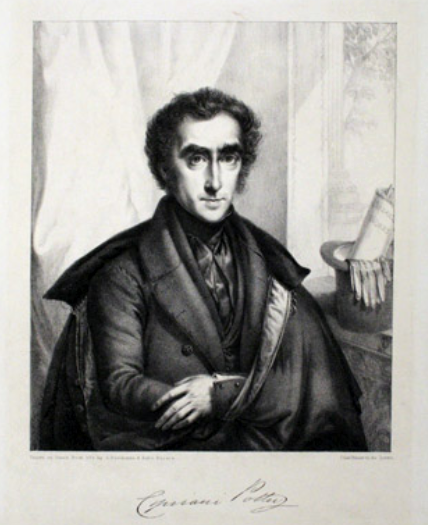
Potter in 1838

Philip Cipriani Hambly Potter (3 October 1792 – 26 September 1871) was an English composer, pianist, conductor and teacher. After an early career as a performer and composer, he was a teacher in the Royal Academy of Music in London and was its principal from 1832 to 1859.

== Life and career ==
=== Early years ===
Potter was born in London to a musical family. He was the third son of the seven children of Richard Huddleston Potter (1755–1821), a flautist, violinist, and teacher, and his wife, Charlotte, née Baumgarten (1757–1837). The name Cipriani, by which he was known throughout his life, came from his godmother, who was said to have been a sister of the artist Giovanni Battista Cipriani.

When Potter was seven his musical instruction began, first with his father and then with Thomas Attwood, William Crotch and, from 1805 to 1810, Joseph Wölfl. The last, who, like Attwood, was a former pupil of Mozart, is considered by the biographer Philip Olleson to have been the teacher who most influenced the young Potter. At 21 Potter was accepted as an associate member of the recently founded Philharmonic Society, and was elected to full membership in 1815. The following year the society commissioned an overture in E minor from him, and he featured in subsequent concerts both as composer and performer. He made his debut as a pianist in his own sextet for piano, flute, and strings, Op. 11, another commission from the society, in April 1816.

=== Vienna and concert career ===
In 1817, Potter travelled to Vienna, where he stayed for eight months, before moving on to other cities in Austria and Germany and then going to Italy. Looking back at Potter's life, the composer and academic Sir George Macfarren observed in 1884 that Potter's temporary residence in continental Europe was "as much for the purpose of study as for the sake of obtaining experience of other musical performances than were to be heard in London. At that time London was not, as it is now, the centre of all that is to be heard in music."

In Vienna, Potter met Beethoven, who approved of him but declined to teach him composition, advising him to study with Aloys Förster. Beethoven nevertheless read some of Potter's compositions and gave him his comments. Potter later published an article, "Recollections of Beethoven" in Musical World, making clear his great admiration and affection. During his time in Italy, Potter developed an admiration of Italian opera, and particularly the works of Rossini. Twelve years later he wrote Variazioni di bravura on a theme by Rossini, using a melody from Matilde di Shabran.

Returning to England in 1819, Potter became a central figure in London concert life as both a pianist and conductor. He regularly programmed the piano concertos of Mozart, which were scarcely known in London: there had been only six performances of a Mozart piano concerto there before Potter's return. He gave regular performances of at least nine of them. (Note: The musicologist Jeremy Dibble lists the nine as K451, 453, 456, 466, 467, 482, 488, 491 and 537. Macfarren recalled that Potter had learnt either from Attwood or in Vienna "that the printed copies are but indications of the matter which Mozart himself used to play … to amplify the written memoranda in his performance. It almost amounted to a re-composition of the part to fill it out with such pianoforte effects as would do justice to the original intention, and it was with such amplification that Potter presented the D minor Concerto." Potter was ahead of his time, and it was not until the late 20th century that embellishment of Mozart's notated solo lines became common.) He also gave the English premieres of Beethoven's Third and Fourth piano concertos.

=== Royal Academy of Music and later years ===
In 1822, Potter began teaching at the newly founded Royal Academy of Music, first piano and later conducting the orchestra. In 1832 he became principal, holding the post for 27 years, a tenure surpassed in length only by that of Alexander Mackenzie. His students included Laura Wilson Barker, Joseph Barnby, William Sterndale Bennett, Henry Charles Banister, William Henry Holmes and Edward Collett May. As he focused more on his educational work and preparing editions of Mozart and Beethoven keyboard music, he composed less and less often. There are few works written after 1837. He maintained a keen interest in new music from the continent, championing the works of Schumann and, in his later years, Brahms. According to Grove's Dictionary of Music and Musicians, "Potter's influence as a teacher was great; a man of ready wit and generosity, he was much admired and loved." In 1849 he was invited by the Bach Society to become their Honorary Auditor, promoting Bach's organ music.

In 1871 Potter's last appearance in concert was in the first British performance of Brahms's German Requiem, in the version with two-piano accompaniment, with the pianist Kate Loder. He died on 26 September of that year at his home near Hyde Park, London, and was buried at Kensal Green Cemetery.

== Music ==
=== Orchestral ===
Potter seems to have adopted two separate systems for the numbering of his symphonies of which nine are extant, the same total being quoted in contemporary commentary: one based on the order of composition (hence those styled 1, 6, 7, 8 and 10) and another based on key (hence the G minor symphony of 1832 is also styled number 2, i.e. the second G minor symphony whilst the two D major symphonies are styled numbers 2 and 4, i.e. the second and fourth D major symphonies). Thus it is possible to surmise that several works, including both a first and a third D major symphony, were lost or destroyed. This has led to considerable confusion which the following list seeks to clarify by adopting a simple chronology.

- Overture in E minor (1815, revised 1848)
- Symphony [No. 1] in G minor (1819, revised 1824–26 & 1833) [styled No. 1 by the composer]
- Symphony [No. 2] in B♭ major (1821, revised 1839) [unnumbered by the composer]
- Symphony [No. 3] in C minor (1826) [styled No. 6 by the composer]
- Symphony [No. 4] in F major (1826) [styled No. 7 by the composer]
- Symphony [No. 5] in E♭ major (1828, revised 1846 with replacement slow movement) [styled No. 8 by the composer]
- Symphony [No. 6] in G minor (1832) [styled both No. 10 and No. 2 in G minor by the composer]
- Symphony [No. 7] in D major (1833) [styled No. 2 in D major by the composer]
- Symphony [No. 8] in C minor (1834) [unnumbered by the composer]
- Symphony [No. 9] in D major (1834) [styled No. 4 in D major by the composer]
- Antony and Cleopatra, overture (1835)
- Cymbeline, overture (1836)
- The Tempest overture (1837)
- March (1854)

=== Concertante ===
- Introduction and Rondo Alla Militaire for piano and orchestra (1827)
- Duo concertante for piano, violin and orchestra (1827)
- Concertante for violin, cello, double bass, piano and orchestra on Les folies d'Espagne
- Bravura Variations on a theme by Rossini for piano and orchestra (1829)
- Ricercata 'on a favourite French theme for piano and orchestra (1830)
- Piano Concerto in D minor (1832)
- Piano Concerto in E♭ major (1833)
- Piano Concerto in E major (1835)

=== Chamber ===
- Grand Trios for clarinet, bassoon and piano
- * No.1 in E♭ major
- * No 2 in D major
- * No 3 in B♭ major
- Piano trio, Op. 12 (c. 1824)
- Sonata di bravura for horn and piano, Op. 13 (alternative version for bassoon, cello and piano) (c. 1824)
- Sextet for flute, string quartet and piano, Op. 11 (c. 1827)
- Sextet in E♭ major, for flute, cello, viola cello, bouble basse and piano (1836)
- String Quartet in G major (1837)

=== Piano ===
(Solo except where otherwise stated)

- 3 Waltzes in German Style (1816)
- Recueil de valzers (1816)
- Trio, piano 5 hands (c. 1816)
- Andante "La placidità" (1817)
- Sonata in C major, Op. 1 (1818)
- Variations on Mozart's "Fin ch'han dal vino", Op. 2 (1816)
- Sonata in D major, Op. 3 (1818)
- Sonata in E minor Op. 4 (1818)
- Polonaise (1818)
- Rondeau (1818)
- Thirteen Variations, on "Bekränzt mit Laub" (c. 1818)
- Rondeau brillant [no.1] (c. 1818)
- Fantasia, March and Trio (c. 1820)
- Grand duo, piano 4 hands, Op. 6 (c. 1821)
- Fantasia, on "Chi dice mal d'amore" (c. 1822)
- Mes rêveries (c. 1823)
- Le départ de Vienne (c. 1823)
- Pezzi di bravura, Op. 15 (c. 1824)
- Andante and Allegretto "Il compiacente", Op. 16 (c. 1824)
- The Parade, military divertimento, Op. 17 (c. 1824)
- Impromptu, on the Scottish air "Auld Robin Gray", Op. 8 (1825)
- Variations and Fantasia on a Favourite Irish Air in the Style of Five Eminent Artists, op.5, Enigma Variations (c.1825)
- 3 Toccatas, Op. 9
  - Toccata in G Major, op. 9 No.1 (publ. c.1816)
  - Toccata in B♭ Major, op. 9 No.2 (publ.1818)
  - Toccata in E Major, op. 9 No.3 (before 1825)
- Studies in All the Major and Minor Keys, Op. 19 (1826)
- Introduction and Rondo giocoso, Op. 20 (c. 1826)
- Introduction and Variations, with coda and cadenza (c. 1826)
- Allegro di bravura "Il vispo e la fuggita" (before 1827)
- Rondeau brillant no.2, Op. 21 (1827)
- Fugue in E major for 3 pianos (1827)
- Fantasia and Fugue for 2 pianos (c. 1818)
- 54 Impromptus, Op. 22 (1832)
- Celebrated Octave Lesson (1834–48)
- Introduction and Variations, on "Alice Gray" (before 1837)
- Impromptu in B♭ (1841)
- 3 amusements, Op. 28 (c. 1848–51)
- Impromptu in D (c. 1850)
- Introduction and Rondoletto, Op. 23 (c. 1851)
- Impromptu in G major and G minor
- Eine Grille (1868)
- Rondo scherzando "Il sollievo" (undated)

=== Vocal ===
- When evening draws her curtain round, for voice and piano (c. 1817)
- No More, canzonet, for voice and piano (1825)
- Medora e Corrado, cantata for solo voices, chorus and orchestra (1830)

Source: Grove's Dictionary of Music and Musicians.

In the Oxford Dictionary of National Biography, Philip Olleson writes that Potter's most productive period as a composer was between his return to Britain 1819 and 1837 after which he produced hardly any music. Olleson comments that although in the list of Potter's works those for solo piano greatly outnumber his other compositions, it is the nine surviving symphonies (Note: Although there are nine extant symphonies, the composer's numbering shows that he wrote ten. The symphony in G minor (1830) was praised by Richard Wagner when he was engaged to conduct for the Royal Philharmonic Society.) that are the most important, and show "many effective touches of orchestration and a good deal of counterpoint and imitation". In the article on Potter in Grove's Dictionary of Music and Musicians, Philip Peter and Julian Rushton express regret that Potter gave up composing, and consider some of his works "masterly": they instance "at least half a dozen of the symphonies", the G major String Quartet, the Sextet for flute, clarinet, viola, cello, double bass and piano and the three overtures to plays by Shakespeare.

The musicologist Lewis Foreman comments that Potter's was the first body of symphonic works by a British composer. In Foreman's view, the symphonies are, for their time, ambitious in their use of the orchestra, showing the influence of early Beethoven, and reminiscent of Schubert's symphonies although the latter were completely unknown in Britain at the time.

== Recordings ==
=== Commercial recordings of works by Potter ===
- Symphony No. 1 in G minor. BBC National Orchestra of Wales, Howard Griffiths, CPO 555 274-2 (2021)
- Symphony No. 7 [also listed above as No. 4, 1826] in F major. Czech Chamber Philharmonic Orchestra, Douglas Bostock, OCLC 767869392
- Symphony No. 8 [also listed above as No. 5, 1828] in E-flat. Milton Keynes Chamber Orchestra, Hilary Davan Wetton OCLC 28508988
- Symphony No. 10 [also listed above as No. 6, 1832] in G minor. Milton Keynes Chamber Orchestra, Hilary Davan Wetton OCLC 28508988
- Cymbeline overture. BBC National Orchestra of Wales/Howard Griffiths, CPO 555 274–2
- Introduzione e Rondo (alla militaire) for Piano and Orchestra. Claire Huangci (piano), BBC National Orchestra of Wales, Howard Griffiths, CPO 555 274–2
- Piano Concerto No. 2 in D minor. Tasmanian Symphony Orchestra, Howard Shelley OCLC 993050841
- Piano Concerto No. 4 in E major. Tasmanian Symphony Orchestra, Howard Shelley OCLC 993050841
- Piano Works. Luke Jones (piano). Naxos 8.574694 (2026)
- Variazioni di bravura on a theme by Rossini. Tasmanian Symphony Orchestra, Howard Shelley OCLC 993050841
- Sonata di bravura for horn and piano. Louis-Pierre Bergeron (natural horn); Meagan Milatz (fortepiano). 2023 ATMA Classique ACD22864.
- Sonata di bravura for horn and piano. John Stobart (horn); Barbro Jansson (piano) OCLC 648758081

Source: WorldCat.

== Notes, references and sources ==
=== Sources ===
- Irving, John (2017). Mozart's Piano Concertos. Abingdon: Routledge. ISBN 978-1-315-09103-7.
