= Edward Loder =

English composer and conductor

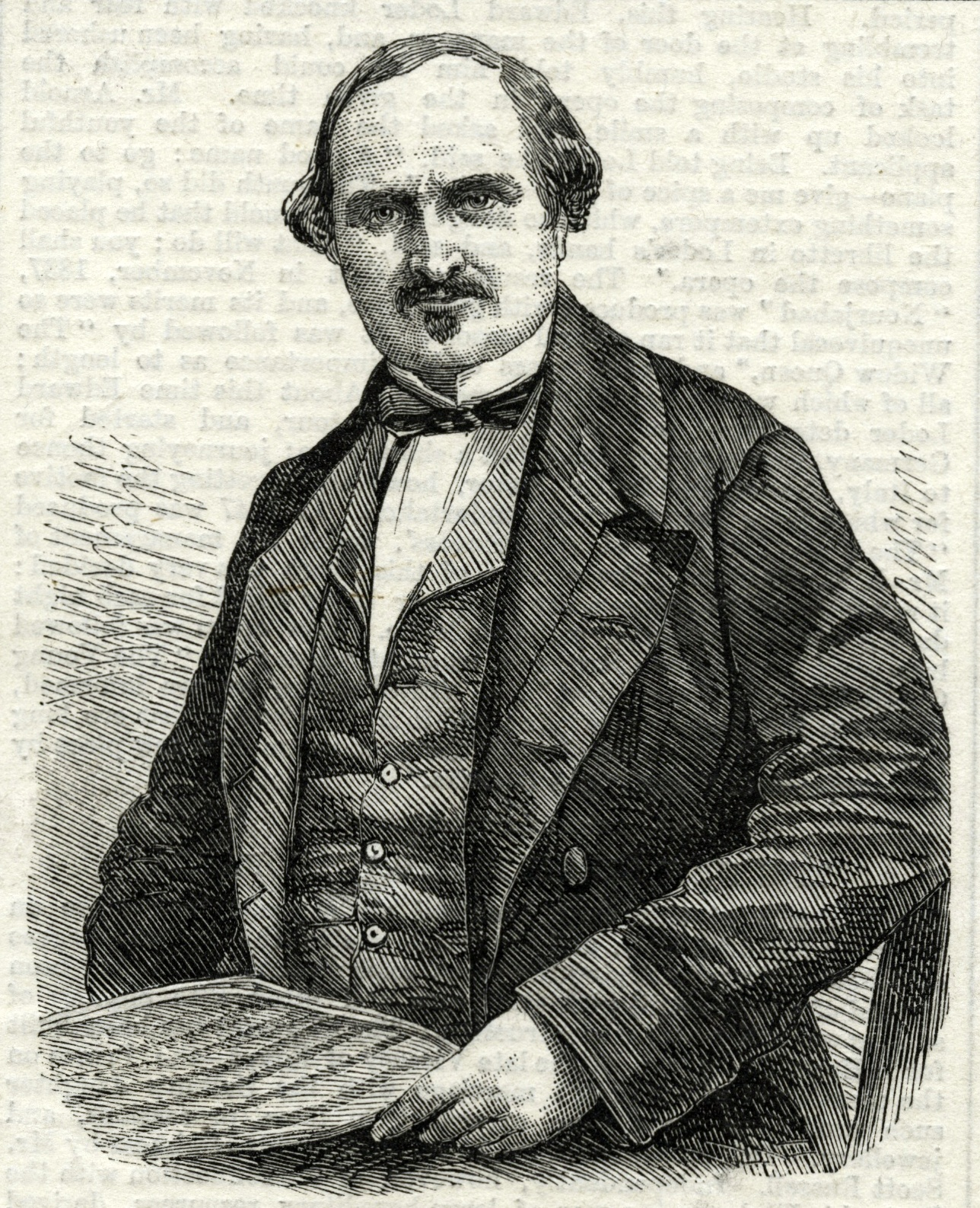
Portrait of Edward James Loder as it appeared on the first page of The Illustrated London News, 27 November 1858

Edward James Loder (10 July 1809 – 5 April 1865) was an English composer and conductor. His best remembered work is perhaps the 1855 opera Raymond and Agnes, though his most successful opera during his lifetime was The Night Dancers.

== Biography ==
Loder was born in Bath, Somerset. He was the son of John David Loder (1788–1846), a violinist and musical director of the Theatre Royal, Bath, and his wife Rosamund, née Mills (1787–1856), a step-daughter of the comedian John Fawcett. Edward Loder's twin brother John Fawcett Loder (1809–1853) was a violinist, and a younger brother William Sowerby Loder (1812–1851) was a cellist who married the soprano Emily Woodyatt. His cousins included the composer and conductor George Loder (1816–1868) and George's sister, composer and pianist Kate Loder.

Loder's family sent him to Frankfurt in 1826 to study under Ferdinand Ries, who was an old friend of the family. He returned to England in 1828 and embarked on a successful career as an opera conductor in London as the music director of Princess's Theatre, and, from 1851 in Manchester, leading the Theatre Royal. His first composing success was Nourjahad in 1834. His compositions include operas, cantatas, ballad operas, string quartets, and many songs. Today he is most remembered for his opera Raymond and Agnes (1855), which was revived in Cambridge in 1966. His most successful opera during his lifetime was The Night Dancers, sometimes referred to as The Wilis, or The Night Dancers, or Giselle, or The Night Dancers, first produced in 1846 and revived at Covent Garden in 1860.

On 10 November 1831, Loder married Elizabeth Mary Watson (c.1813–1880) at Bristol. It appears they were separated within a few years, as in 1861 he stated that his wife was Louisa Alice Foster, born c. 1838. He appears to have fathered a son (Edward Loder Garside 1850–1940) with the actress Clara Garside Neville (1827–1869) during his marriage to Louisa. Tributes at the time of his death state that he was a bachelor.

He died in London in 1865.

== Works ==
- Incidental music for the melodrama Black-Eyed Susan, or All in the Downs by Douglas William Jerrold (18 November 1830, Theatre Royal, Bath)
- Nourjahad, grand opera by Samuel James Arnold (21 July 1834, Lyceum Theatre, London)
- The Widow Queen, historical drama by Thomas James Serle (9 October 1834, English Opera House, London)
- The Covenanters, Scottish ballad opera by Thomas John Dibdin (10 August 1835, English Opera House, London)
- The Dice of Death, melodrama by John Oxenford (14 September 1835, English Opera House, London)
- The Foresters, or Twenty-Five Years Since, drama by Thomas James Serle (19 October 1838, Covent Garden Theatre, London)
- Francis the First, opera by McKinlan (6 November 1838, Drury Lane Theatre, London)
- The Deer Stalkers, or The Outlaw's Daughter, Scottish operatic drama by Mark Lemon (12 April 1841, English Opera House, London)
- The Wilis, or The Night Dancers, romantic drama by George Soane (28 October 1846, Princess's Theatre, London)
- The Sultana, comedietta, adaptation from Isaac Bickerstaffe's The Sultan, or a Peep into the Seraglio (8 January 1848, Princess's Theatre, London)
- The Andalusian, or the Young Guard, operetta by George Soane (20 January 1848, Princess's Theatre, London)
- Robin Goodfellow, or the Frolics of Puck, ballad opera by Edward Loder (6 December 1848, Princess's Theatre, London)
- The Island of Calypso, operatic masque by George Soane (14 April 1852, Exeter Hall, London)
- Dick Whittington and His Cat, burletta by Mark Lemon based on the English legend (December 1852, Theatre Royal, Manchester)
- Balcony Courtship, farce by Edward Loder (6 May 1853, Theatre Royal, Manchester)
- Raymond and Agnes, romantic opera by Edward Fitzball (14 August 1855, Theatre Royal, Manchester)
- Never Judge by Appearances, operetta by Henri Drayton (7 July 1859, Adelphi Theatre, London)
- Saved by a Song, operetta by Henry Robert Addison (21 December 1868 (posthumous), Princess's Theatre, London)
