= Beatrice Langley =

English violinist (1872–1958)

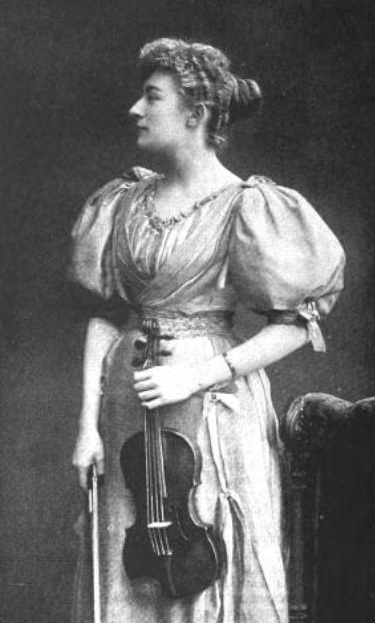
Portrait of Beatrice Langley in 1896

Beatrice Cordelia Langley (12 January 1872 – 11 May 1958) was an English violinist. Known professionally as Madame Beatrice Langley, she was a prominent soloist and chamber music performer from the late 1890s until the early 1920s.

== Education ==
Born in Chudleigh, Devonshire, Langley was the daughter of William Savage Langley, a lieutenant colonel in the Royal Artillery, and Cordelia Catherine Mitchell. She had private violin lessons in London with Joseph Ludwig (1844–1924 and August Wilhelmj in London during her childhood. She went on to study at the Royal Academy of Music from 1903 to 1906 with Gabriele Wietrowetz, Karl Klingler, and Joseph Joachim.

== Career ==
Langley made her first public appearance in 1882 at the age of nine: in Dublin, she played the obbligato violin part in Gaetano Braga's Serenata to accompany her mother, a well-known amateur singer. In November 1893 she made her London debut at the Crystal Palace, performing Max Bruch's First Violin Concerto and a Capriccio by Niels Gade under the direction of August Manns. A few days later she played Louis Spohr's Violin Concerto No. 9 at the London Symphony Concerts under the direction of George Henschel. In February 1894 she appeared with the Imperial Institute Orchestra under the direction of Alberto Randegger, playing Mendelssohn's Violin Concerto.

In 1895, Langley made her first appearance in a concert by the singer Emma Albani at the Queen's Hall (accompanied by the pianist Fanny Davies). She accompanied Albani on many concert tours through England, the US, South Africa, Canada, and Newfoundland over the following years. Her other musical partners around the turn of the century included the pianist Agnes Zimmermann, the violinist Alice Elieson, the sisters Louise and Jeanne Douste de Fortis, Adelina de Lara, and Percy Grainger. In the 1900/01 season, she played in the Henry Wood Proms, and in 1905 she gave the first performance of William Bredt's New Hungarian Melodies in London.

In 1906, Langley founded the Thursday Twelve O'Clock concert series at London's Aeolian Hall with Mathilde Verne. She also founded the Mukle-Langley Quartet with cellist May Mukle and performed in other chamber music groups. In 1907 the Quartet included Marjorie Hayward, Sybil Maturin and Adelina Leon; the line-up changed several times in later years. In 1910 she played Frank Bridge's string quartet with Mukle and the composer; in 1916, she played Maurice Ravel's Piano Trio in A minor with Juliette Folville and Warwick Evans; and in 1919, she played a piano trio by John Ireland with Roger Quilter and Cedric Sharpe.

Langley was also active in the English women's movement. In 1909, she performed with the English Ladies Orchestral Society, and in 1911 she participated in the Woman Suffrage Entertainment Programme for the Census Resisters, performing a concert with Ethel Smyth.

== Personal life ==
Before her 1896 concert tour, Langley married the author and journalist Bazil Tozer, and there were two sons: Philip and Leonard. In the late 1890s they had a London home near Regent's Park, but maintained a house in Teignmouth, Devon. In 1913 the London address was 70a Longridge Road, Earl's Court. Around 1920, she became ill with arthritis and had to give up her career as a violin soloist. In 1934 she was the inaugural director of the Wiltshire Rural Music School. She moved to Tunbridge Wells, where she was living in 1938. According to her sister Rosalind Langley she founded her own string orchestra, which existed until around 1948, and gave musical appreciation classes.

Her husband died in 1949, and at the end of her life she moved back to Teignmouth, where she conducted the Devon and Teignmouth String Orchestra into the early 1950s. In 1953 she was presented with the Kreisler Award of merit for services to music. Langley died at her home - Eastbrook House in Buckeridge Road - in May 1958, aged 86.
