= Leonard Borwick =

English concert pianist

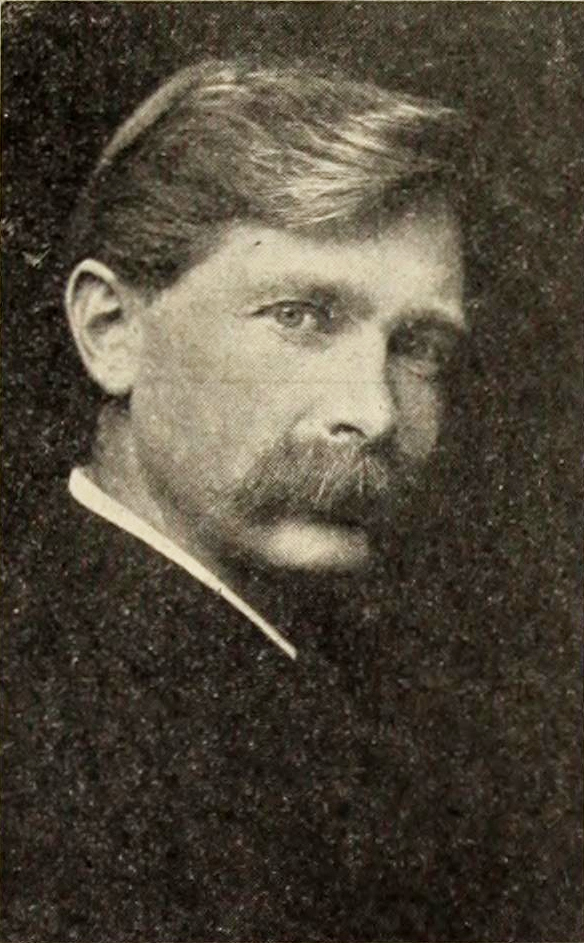
Leonard Borwick

Leonard Borwick (26 February 1868 – 15 September 1925) was an English concert pianist especially associated with the music of Robert Schumann and Johannes Brahms.

== Early training and debuts ==
Born in Walthamstow, Essex, of a Staffordshire family, Leonard Borwick studied piano under Henry R. Bird, and violin and viola under Alfred Gibson until the age of 16. He then went to study piano under Clara Schumann at the Hoch Conservatory, Frankfurt, and also composition under Bernhard Scholz and Iwan Knorr, and violin and viola under Fritz Basserman. During the later 1880s, while on leave from Clara Schumann's school, Borwick had met the baritone Harry Plunket Greene while playing one evening at Arthur Chappell's house in London. Greene had been at Clifton College with Borwick's brother, and a friendship grew up between them. He made his debut at the Museum concerts in Frankfurt in Beethoven's "Emperor" concerto in November 1889, and in the same month at Strasbourg under the direction of Franz Stockhausen (a pupil of Alkan) in that concerto and with pieces by Chopin (a Nocturne) and Liszt (the Paganini Études).

== London debut and recitals 1890–1891 ==
His London debut was on 8 May 1890, at a Royal Philharmonic Society concert, in Schumann's Piano Concerto in A minor. He performed it again in London on 12 June, and on 17 June in a concert for Hans Richter he played a Brahms Rhapsody, sharing the platform with Marie Fillunger (1850–1930), lieder singer and intimate of the Schumann-Joachim circle. He also played the Brahms D minor concerto, which George Bernard Shaw called 'a hash of bits and scraps with plenty of thickening in the pianoforte part, which Mr Leonard Borwick played with the enthusiasm of youth in a style technically admirable'. Shaw recommended that he should embark on recitals.

On 20 September he performed a piano quartet of Brahms, and in November 1890 he performed both the quartet, and the Die Junge Nonne and Nacht und Traume with Fillunger, at Windsor for a royal concert. He has been described as 'Queen Victoria's favourite pianist'. By December, Shaw described him as 'a finished pupil ... his quick musical feeling and diligently-earned technical accomplishment entitle him to take his place with credit among our foremost concert-players'. In March 1891 he played a Bach concerto for two pianos with Ilona Eibenschütz (a Clara Schumann pupil) at a Bach Choir concert. That autumn he played at Windsor again, with the violinist Emily Shinner-Liddell (a Joachim pupil). Clara Schumann's other famous British pupil Fanny Davies was at that time also beginning her career in London.

== Vienna debut – Brahms ==
Borwick played Brahms's D minor concerto under Hans Richter in Vienna in 1891. Brahms himself was at this concert, and wrote to Clara Schumann that her pupil's playing had contained all the fire and passion and technical ability the composer had hoped for in his most sanguine moments. From this time on Borwick became closely associated with the music of Brahms, and with the English work of Brahms's friend and chief interpreter, the violinist Joseph Joachim. Clara Schumann wrote to Professor Bernuth in Hamburg to recommend Borwick as 'probably her finest pupil: I never heard the A minor concerto of Schumann nor the D minor of Brahms played better.'

== London recitals ==
By 1893 Borwick had begun touring in Europe, and was playing in the Popular Concerts at St James's Hall, and in chamber concerts with the Joachim Quartet. Shaw thought his playing of Chopin's Funeral March Sonata in October was excellent, but disliked Borwick's attempts to 'sentimentalise and prettify' Beethoven. In February 1894 at the Popular Concerts, late in the B flat sonata, D. 960 of Schubert, and in Schumann pieces, he seemed to be 'dreaming about the pieces rather than thinking about them'. When Borwick came to the platform, he sat meditatively before the keyboard for some moments before acknowledging the audience, and when playing he became so absorbed that he forgot the audience. (Once, playing a false last note, he angrily banged the correct note until the audience's laughter reminded him that he was actually in concert.)

In March 1894 the Philharmonic Society opened its season, moving to the Queen's Hall. Borwick played the Beethoven Emperor Concerto. Shaw found him blameless but unmemorable: perhaps it was overshadowed by the English premiere of Tchaikovsky's Pathetique Symphony, which Sir Alexander Mackenzie conducted on the same occasion. However, Borwick's warmth and colour were appreciated by the Philharmonic, who asked him back repeatedly, and Herman Klein felt that at last the dry days of Arabella Goddard and her feux d'artifice were at an end. A Chopin B flat minor Sonata given in June was received with large enthusiasm at St James's Hall, together with works of Saint-Saëns, Schumann, Liszt and Mendelssohn. In July 1894 he gave two London solo evenings with Emily Shinner and Marie Fillunger at the Queen's Hall in recital of works by Brahms and Schumann.

== Recitals with Plunket Greene ==
However a new partnership was beginning. Plunket Greene (who had also trained in Germany) proposed in 1893 that they should deliver solo recitals each year in London, followed by tours in the provinces. Borwick fell in with the idea, and their first London recital was in December 1893 at St James's Hall, followed by a national tour. For the first two years Borwick was accompanist, as well as playing his solo pieces, but later Samuel Liddle was brought in to accompany, and the team was complete. Their watchword was that no care should be taken of hands or voice, there should be no interest in publicity, and musical values should prevail. Their repertoire ranged from Bach to the moderns, and they never repeated a song in ten years of London recitals.

Specializing in lieder of Franz Schubert, Schumann and Brahms, but performing songs of all kinds, they were pioneering the themed recital (usually about 90 minutes). On 11 January 1895 Borwick and Plunket Greene gave the first complete performance of Schumann's Dichterliebe ever heard in England, at St James' Hall. Borwick always accompanied without sheet music. Plunket Greene was the original performer of many of Arthur Somervell's songs (and those of Hubert Parry and Charles Villiers Stanford), and Borwick and the composer gave the first performance of Somervell's Variations on an original theme in E minor, for two pianos. The friendship always remained, but the routine of the recitals and tours, which had to be fitted around separate English, continental and transatlantic engagements, was dissolved around 1904 rather than continue less than wholeheartedly.

== Artistic interests ==
Borwick had many interests, including contemporary art. Among the artists he admired was Vilhelm Hammershøi, of whose work he possessed at least two examples. Between 1897 and 1906 the artist made three visits to London to paint: Borwick persuaded him to visit Whistler, but this was not a success. Two of the artist's paintings in the national collections (one in National Gallery and one in Tate Britain) are associated with Borwick: 'Interior 1899' was given to the National Gallery by friends of Borwick in memory of him.

== Continuing pianism ==
Borwick was increasingly identified with instrumental recital work with Joachim and others, and was making tours, notably in Germany, Paris and Scandinavia. In January 1903 he performed piano duets with Edward Elgar: in March 1904 he was playing in Berlin. In a recital at the Bechstein Hall in May 1906, he and Joachim performed sonatas of Beethoven (Op. 23 in A minor; Op. 30, No. 1 in A major), Bach (B minor), Mozart (E flat, Peters No. 16) and Brahms (Op. 78 in G major). Joachim declared that he preferred Borwick to any other partner in such work. He did not neglect the provinces: in November 1908, for instance, he scored a triumph when reappearing after 11 years to give the Saint-Saëns G minor concerto its first performance in York with the York Symphony Orchestra, and followed by a Bach Organ Fugue, Domenico Scarlatti sonatas and a Chopin waltz.

In 1911–12 he undertook an extended concert tour in the United States and Australia, and returned invigorated with a new confidence and freshness in his playing. This seemed to promise a new phase in his career. In March 1914 the Philharmonic Society heard him play the Schumann concerto under Willem Mengelberg: and in an Appassionata Sonata delivered in Edinburgh in 1913, and in his November 1914 Carnegie Hall recital (which included Bruyères, the first English performance of any of the Debussy Preludes from Book II), seemed to promise much: 'a freedom and vigour which gave his art a new force'. Plunkett Greene much admired his Gaspard de la nuit (Ondine), of Ravel. In 1913 he listed his interests as poetry, painting, Italy, tennis, cycling, gymnastics and conjuring. He was good at chess and billiards, and was a regular visitor to Lord's cricket ground. He was also a vegetarian, and an idealist in various other matters who always stuck to his principles.

World War I brought an end to many hopes. At the Polish Victims Relief Fund concert, July 1915, he performed Paderewski's Polish Fantasy (piano and orchestra) under Thomas Beecham, and played Chopin. After the war, in May 1919 he and the violinist Jelly d'Arányi gave a memorial sonata concert at the Wigmore Hall for the Irish-Australian musician Frederick Septimus Kelly, an Oxford graduate killed in 1916. In 1921 he gave two recitals in the Aeolian Hall in March and April, which included his transcription of Debussy's Prélude à l'après-midi d'un faune (originally premiered for him by Mark Hambourg). In almost the same week George Copeland played his own transcription of the same piece. A critic found Borwick's version 'complicated and cold', though it is still much admired.

Leonard Borwick died at Le Mans in 1925. He is remembered as a poet of the keyboard, a great painter of pianistic colours, who possessed a very broad range of expression from the most delicate touch to a fire and resource of tonal depth greater than that usually associated with the Clara Schumann school. Plunket Greene remembered how he communed with beauty and saw visions, his reverence, quiet simplicity, and his avoidance of personal publicity. He made no gramophone records. The Royal College of Music awards a Leonard Borwick Pianoforte Prize to outstanding students.

His own students included Anthony Bernard.

== Compositions ==
Piano arrangements:

- Bach: Chorale, Jesu bleibet meine Freude, Movt 10, Cantata BWV 147. (Augener)
- Bach: Chorale Prelude, O Lamm Gottes Unschuldig, BWV 618 or 656.? (Augener)
- Debussy: Prélude à l'après-midi d'un faune. (Fromont)
- Debussy: Fetes. (Fromont)
- Coleridge-Taylor: Two Moorish Tone-Pictures, Op. 17. (Augener)

== Sources ==
- L. Borwick, (Article by), in Music and Letters Jan 1925.
- L. Carley, Edvard Grieg in England (Boydell, Woodbridge 2007).
- -. Dixon, On the difference of Time and Rhythm in Music, Mind IV (1895), 236–239.
- A. Eaglefield-Hull, A Dictionary of Modern Music and Musicians (Dent, London 1924).
- R. Elkin, Royal Philharmonic (Rider, London 1946).
- H. Plunket Greene, From Blue Danube to Shannon, (Philip Allan, London 1934) (Reproduces article 'Some personal recollections' from Music and Letters, 7, no 1 (Jan 1926), 17–24.)
- H.R., Review of a Leonard Borwick Concert, The New Age, 7 April 1921, Vol 28 no 23, p270.
- W. Saunders, Leonard Borwick: A Memory and Appreciation, Musical Times 67 (1 September 1926), 798–9.
- G.B. Shaw, Music in London 1890–1894 (Constable, London 1932).
- H. Wood, My Life of Music (Gollancz, London 1938).
- M.K. Woods, The Art of Leonard Borwick, Girl's Own Paper 23 (1903), 372.
- Obituary of Leonard Borwick, Illustrated London News, 26 September 1925.

Discovery of letters in Bonn
