= Anthony Bernard =

English conductor, organist, pianist and composer (1891 - 1963)

Anthony Bernard (25 January 1891 – 6 April 1963) was an English conductor, organist, pianist and composer.

== Early life ==
Anthony Bernard's birth was registered as Alan Charles Butler in West Ham, then classified as Essex, in early 1891. His mother was Rosetta Ann Casselden, who had married Alfred Charles Butler, a coal-merchant (son of Henry Butler, also a coal-merchant) four years earlier on 21 September 1887. Bernard changed his name by deed poll in 1919 according to the National Archives.

Further family research has uncovered that Bernard was the illegitimate child of Casselden and the Edwardian band leader Thomas Bidgood. Another of Bidgood's sons was the dance band leader Harry Bidgood, also known as Primo Scala. In the 1901 census, Casselden was not living with her husband; she declared herself to be Rosetta Barnard and her 10-year-old son Alan Charles Butler to be "Allan Barnard" who was born in New York. Prior to cohabiting with Bidgood, she had three more sons (1893 - Thomas George who died in infancy; 1896 - Thomas Walter; and 1898 - Henry James), all were registered as "Barnard" (Harry Bidgood was Henry James Barnard). Thomas Walter was registered with Butler as the mother's name, the other two with Casselden. By the time Thomas Bidgood left his wife and son Albert Thomas, and set up home with Rosetta Casselden/Butler, Alan Charles Butler had moved on, and the remaining three sons adopted the surname Bidgood. A fourth was born in 1914 and named Warwick Bidgood. It is not a requirement of English law to register a change of name, and deed poll is optional.

The adopted surname of Anthony Bernard therefore seems to have derived from his mother's use of Barnard, though her reasons for doing so remain unclear.

Anthony Bernard studied with Joseph Holbrooke, John Ireland, Leonard Borwick and Sir Granville Bantock. He was appointed organist at St. Augustine's, Ramsgate in 1910. He worked in some other churches, and also became well known as an accompanist to singers, such as Muriel Foster, who retained him for the rest of her career, and John Coates.

== Career ==
With W. H. "Billy" Reed (leader of the London Symphony Orchestra) as violinist, Bernard was the pianist in the premiere performance of Edward Elgar's Violin Sonata in E minor, on 13 March 1919 at a semi-public meeting of the British Music Society.

In 1921 he and Reed attended a luncheon convened by Elgar, the other invitees being Arthur Bliss, Eugene Goossens, John Ireland and Adrian Boult. The purpose of the meeting turned out to be Elgar's suggestion that Bliss, Goossens and Herbert Howells each write a new piece for the 1922 Three Choirs Festival, to be held in Gloucester. Bliss's contribution was his A Colour Symphony. Goossens wrote Silence for chorus and orchestra. Howells wrote Sine Nomine for wordless chorus (which was not given its second performance until his centenary year 1992). Elgar's own contribution was his orchestration of Bach's Fantasia and Fugue in C minor, BWV 542.

=== London Chamber Orchestra ===
That year Anthony Bernard formed the London Chamber Orchestra (LCO), and led them in unfamiliar and better-known repertoire from the early masters through to contemporary composers such as Frederick Delius. He also founded the London Chamber Singers. From 1922 to 1926 he conducted the Dutch Chamber Orchestra, and in 1926 he took the LCO on a tour of Spain. He conducted the British National Opera Company in 1924 and 1925.

=== Notable performances ===
He conducted the first performance of Christian Darnton's Octet for flute, clarinet, bassoon, cornet and string quartet, on 26 March 1927.

In 1927, he presented a festival of the music of Manuel de Falla, in which the Harpsichord Concerto and Master Peter's Puppet Show had their first performances in England; the solo part in the concerto was played by Falla himself. In 1928 his orchestra became associated with the New English Musical Society. In 1929, Bernard conducted the London Chamber Orchestra in the first complete recording of Bach's Brandenburg Concertos. It is not certain that this recording was officially issued, and only excerpts are now known to exist.

Anthony Bernard conducted the first recording to be released of Frederick Delius's Sea Drift (1929) with the baritone Roy Henderson and the New English Symphony Orchestra, and was praised by the composer's wife Jelka for his conducting.

He also conducted the first concert performance of Ralph Vaughan Williams's A Christmas Carol Suite, on 17 December 1929 in London. Lennox Berkeley was another composer who entrusted the first performances of some of his works to Anthony Bernard.

=== Other activities ===
In 1930 he organised a festival of Italian music from the 11th to the 20th centuries. He performed similar services for French music and was later honoured by the French government for his services. He also conducted opera both at home and abroad. From 1932 to 1942 he was musical director of the Shakespeare Memorial Theatre at Stratford-upon-Avon. His activities also included conducting orchestras such as the London Symphony Orchestra, the Concerts Colonne, and others in Copenhagen, The Hague, Madrid, Athens and Prague. Later in life, he wrote a great deal of incidental music, both for the theatre (such as In Parenthesis (David Jones) and Queen Mary (Tennyson, 1947)) and for radio plays by Euripides (Iphigenia in Aulis (1951), and Ion and Bacchae), Shakespeare (The Tempest (1951) and A Midsummer Night's Dream) and others. He produced a version of The Beggar's Opera scored for flute, oboe, bassoon, harpsichord and strings. His other compositions include an organ prelude, Rorate Coeli (1916), Petite Suite: Aucassin et Nicolette for violin and piano (published Winthrop Rogers, 1917), the Variations on a Hill Tune, for piano (1920), and songs, such as The Cherry Tree Song.

Robert Simpson dedicated his Symphony No. 2 (1956) to Anthony Bernard, who conducted the premiere performance with the LCO.

Bernard died in 1963, aged 72.

== Elgar's Concert Allegro ==
Anthony Bernard played a role in the story of Edward Elgar's Concert Allegro, Op. 46, for piano solo. Elgar started to revise and shorten the piece after its first performance by Fanny Davies in 1901, and even toyed with the idea of turning it into a piano concerto. These revisions were never finished, and the original version was never published. Elgar may have given the manuscript away; in any event, it was not found in his papers at his death, and was considered lost. In around 1942, however, Bernard was given the manuscript (by whom is not recorded), and was asked to arrange the piece for piano and orchestra. He thought it worked better as a solo piano piece, and did no work on his commission. The manuscript was still in his study when it was bombed during World War II, and it was assumed destroyed along with other papers of his. After his death, however, his widow came across the manuscript. It came to the attention of the pianist John Ogdon and the musicologist Diana McVeigh, who together worked on it to extricate the original work from Elgar's crossings out, additions and changes, all made after Fanny Davies' first performance. Ogdon gave the first modern performance of the work in 1969.

== Personal life ==
Anthony Bernard was married twice, his first marriage ending in divorce. His elder daughter Nicolette Bernard was an actress. The younger, Christine Bernard, was an editor, publisher, author and agent.

The singer-songwriter Elly Jackson is his great-granddaughter.

== Recordings ==
His recordings were numerous. They included:

- Francis Poulenc's Piano Concerto with the composer as soloist
- the Bach Double Violin Concerto with Yehudi Menuhin and Gioconda de Vito
- Hans Hotter singing Bach with the Philharmonia Orchestra
- Lois Marshall in Handel and Haydn with the London Symphony Orchestra
- the Water Music and Royal Fireworks Music of Handel, again with the LSO
- Richard Lewis, Alfred Deller, and Norman Walker singing Purcell
- and accompanying Teresa Stich-Randall in Handel, Mozart and Schubert lieder.
