= Sophia Flora Heilbron =

English pianist and child prodigy (1857-1944)

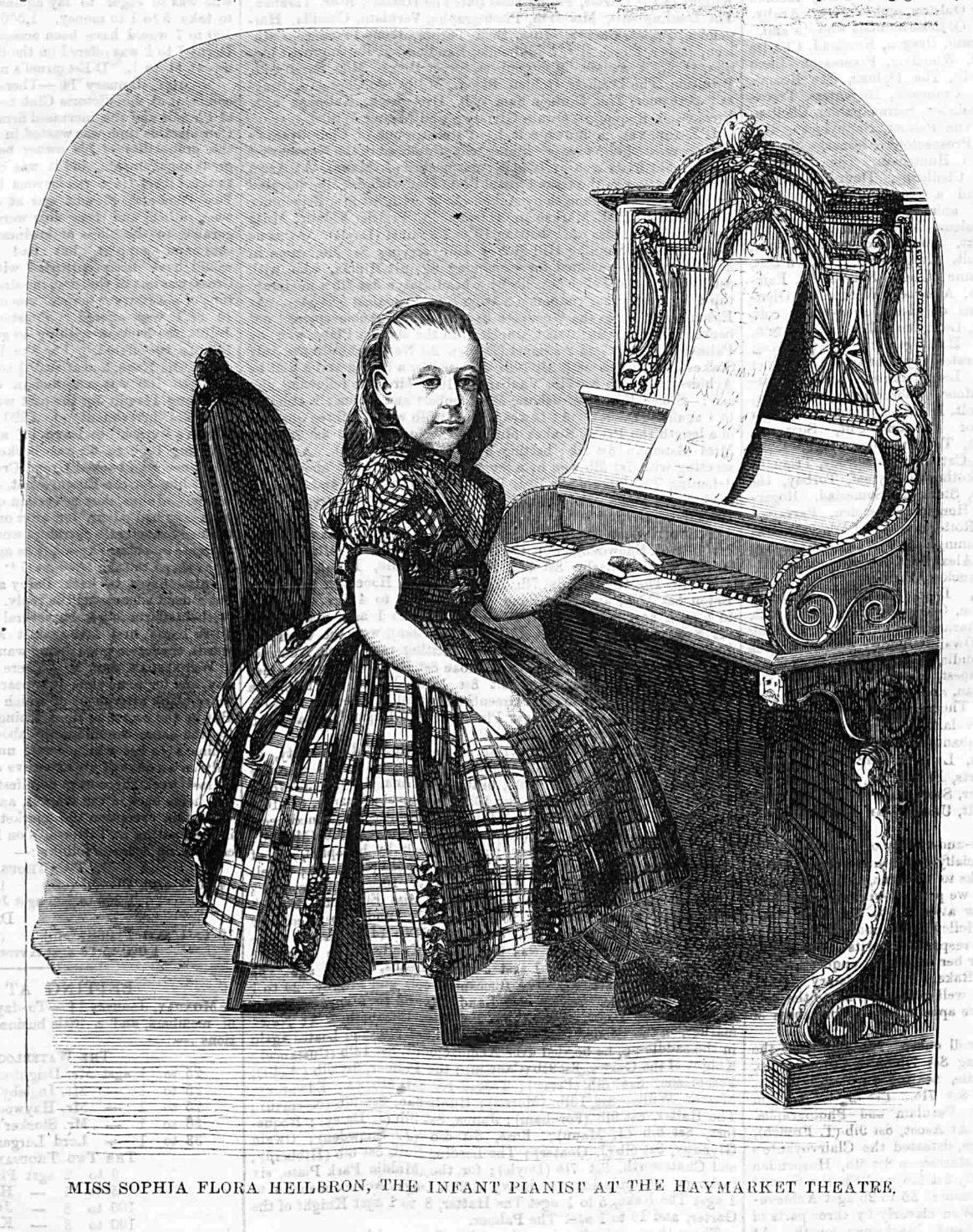
Miss Sophia Flora Heilbron, the Infant Pianist at the Haymarket Theatre, 1867

Mademoiselle Sophia Flora Salomon, née Heilbron (2 August 1857 – 9 January 1944) was an English pianist and child prodigy of German-Jewish descent.

== Biography ==
=== Early life and education ===
Heilbron was born in St Pancras, London, the eldest of nine children of Henry Lewis Heilbron, a Dutch-born general dealer, and Matilda Kyezor. She was the granddaughter of property developer Louis Kyezor, later described by local historians as "The King of Whitton" for his extensive building activity in the area.

Raised in Hammersmith, Heilbron showed musical ability from an early age, undertaking piano lessons from a young woman in the local area - gaining her the local moniker "Musical Little Wonder". In July 1865, while accompanying her father on a business trip to Dublin, the seven-year-old Heilbron visited the Exhibition Palace. Reportedly, the young Miss Heilbron was quite taken with the musical instruments department, proceeding to open and begin playing several of Broadwood’s grand pianos. A crowd accumulated around the child and when asked why she had begun to play she replied, "I like the fun". So enthused by the talents of the girl were the exhibition's attendees that Heilbron was invited to perform there daily for a fortnight.

=== Musical career ===
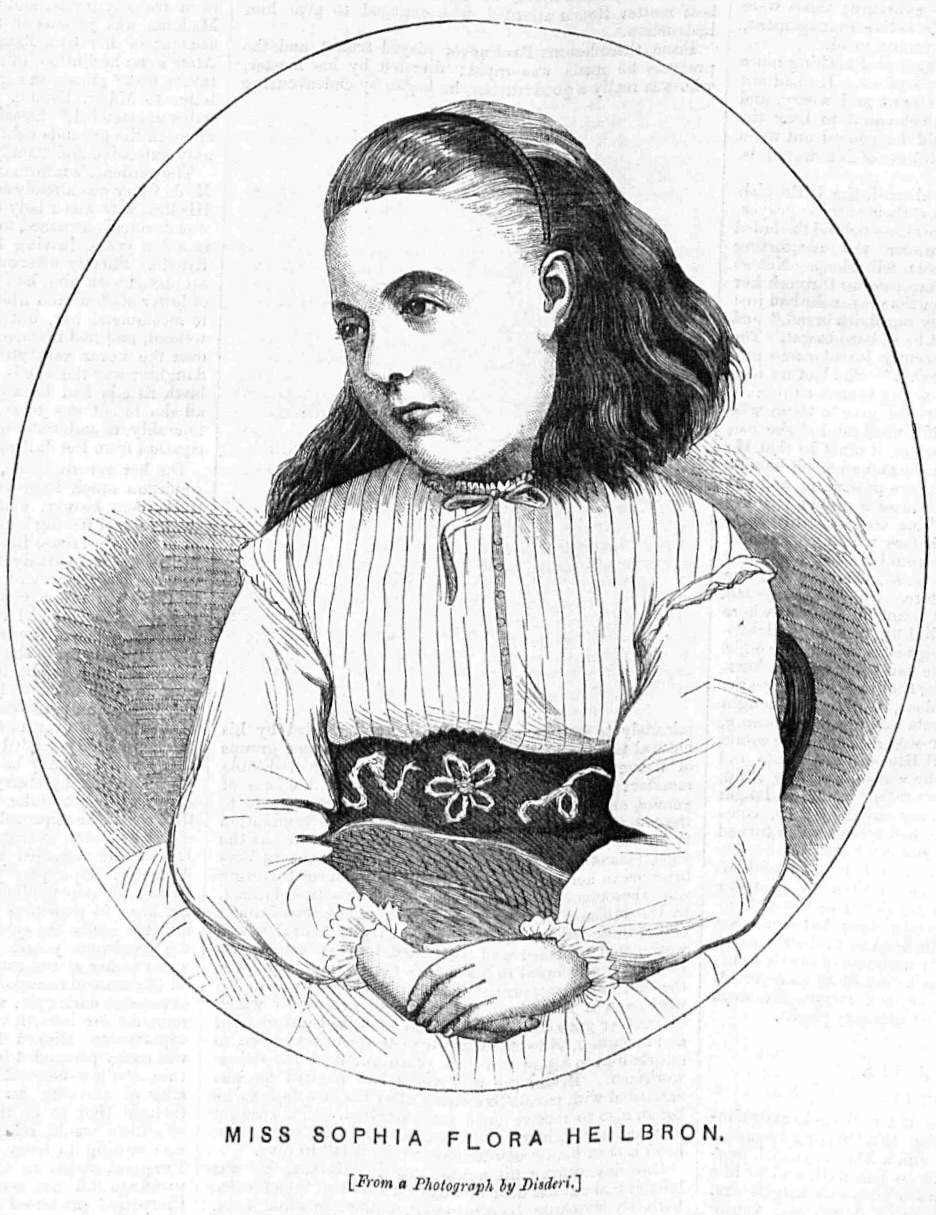
Miss Sophia Flora Heilbron after a photograph by Disderi, 1868

Following her return to London, Heilbron studied under Edwin C. Jucks and soon began appearing in public concerts. In March 1866 she performed selections including "Le Jet d'Eau", pieces from Friedrich von Flotow's opera Martha, and “Il Bacio” at the Industrial Exhibition at Guildhall. The London Evening Standard described "this precious girl" as eliciting "the heartiest pleasure and delight by artless touch and harmony of tone on the pianoforte".

During 1866 Heilbron appeared at a number of concerts and charitable events in London, including performances at Willis’s Rooms, St Peter's Church in Vauxhall, and the Theatre Royal Haymarket, where she appeared in conjunction with a troupe of child performers known as the "Living Miniatures". Lewis Carroll attended one of these performances with two of the MacDonald children in January 1867.

That same year Heilbron performed before Gioachino Rossini in his own home in Paris, where the composer "complimented her very much upon her talent". By 1868 she had played for several European royal figures, including the Emperor of Russia, the Emperor of Austria and the Crown Prince of Prussia.

During this time Heilbron resided at "Heilbron-villa", 13 Cathnor Road, Hammersmith, regularly promoting her services as an acclaimed pianist for private soirées. Throughout her early teens Heilbron was a regular face at charity concerts, offering her talents at somewhere in the region of eighty events over the course of her career. In June 1868 Heilbron performed "Invitation à la valse", for Mr. Lindsay Sloper's Grand Morning Concert, who she would for a short time study under.

In July 1868, Heilbron made her debut at the Beethoven Rooms, Harley Street, taking to the piano "as spontaneously as most girls of her age take to dolls". Between November and December 1868, Heilbron performed at the West End Lecture Hall in Hammersmith, Crystal Palace, and the Store Street Concert Hall.

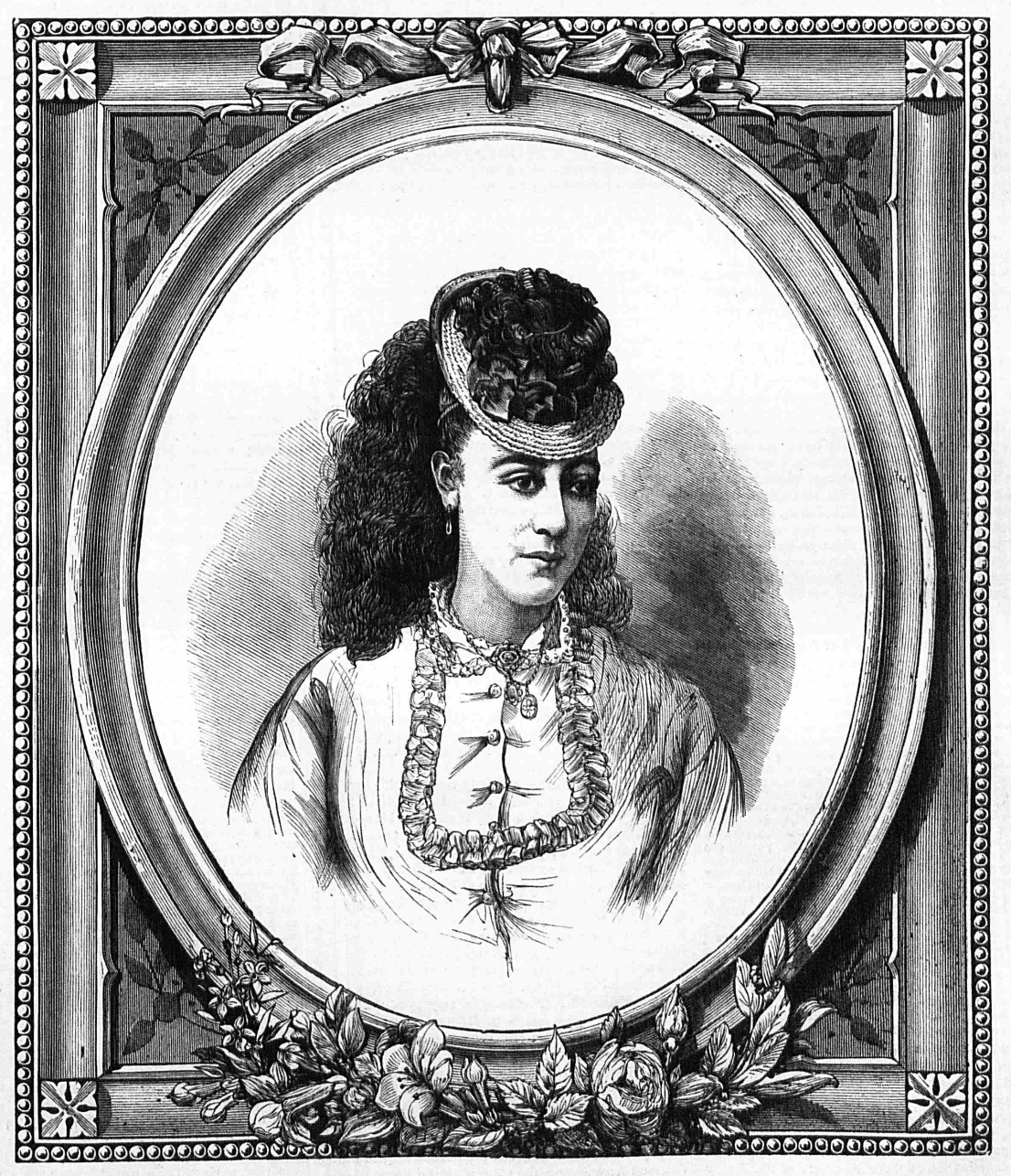
Sophia Flora Heilbron, 1871

At around the age of thirteen, Heilbron came under the tuition of Ferdinand Praeger. As her father later explained in a letter to the New York Times, his daughter could no longer work under Sloper for he had succumbed to "the powerful influence brought to bear" by James William Davison, the chief music critic for The London Times. He accused Davison of being prejudiced against Heilbron for the convictions expressed by other papers that she and pianist Arabella Goddard, Davison's wife, were on equal footing. In 1868 the Middlesex Chronicle had described "that young lady's command of the instrument, taste, and execution" as being equal to the then thirty-two-year-old Goddard. By refusing to remove these endorsements from Heilbron's personal advertisements, the Times allegedly refused to cover "The Infant Pianist" in the paper's columns.

During the 1870s Heilbron toured Europe and, in 1874, travelled to the United States, where she continued performing in New York. She appeared at venues including the Eagle Theatre and Steinway Hall.

While touring, Henry Heilbron argued that despite his daughter's "marked success", the New York Times music critic, a regular attendee at "nearly all her soirées" had not deemed his child worthy of comment - tarnished by the influence of the London branch and Davison. Five months later, the Times did eventually cover a concert of Heilbron's, describing the young pianist as having "considerable technique", "great vigor and endurance", and the ability to read music adequately.

=== Marriage and children ===
In April 1876 Heilbron gave a farewell concert in New York before retiring from public performance. Nearly a month to the day later, 12 May 1876, she married Mr. Ferdinand Salomon, an established New York broker.

The following year the couple gave birth to the first of four sons, Arthur Salomon. He, along with his brothers Percy and Herbert, would come to be known as The Salomon Brothers of New York, founders of a money brokerage firm, and later bank, of the same name. The second child, Leo Salomon, did not join in this venture.

=== Death ===
Flora died in New York on 9 January 1944 and was buried in Salem Fields Cemetery in Brooklyn.

== Compositions ==
While in New York Heilbron published several piano compositions, including:

- Consolation Elegie (1874), dedicated to Mrs. Nellie W. Prior.
- Nellie’s Wedding Waltz (1874), dedicated to Julia Dent Grant, First Lady of the United States.
- Heilbron’s Musical Box (1874), dedicated to Mrs. Jessie Seligman.
