= William Henry Holmes (musician) =

English pianist and composer

William Henry Holmes (or W. H. Holmes; 8 January 1812 – 23 April 1885) was an English pianist and composer, and a teacher at the Royal Academy of Music.

== Early life ==
Holmes was born in Sudbury, Derbyshire in 1812, the son of a musician. He entered the Royal Academy of Music in 1822, the year it opened, and he gained two of the first medals given by the Academy, for composition and the piano.

== Career ==
Holmes became Sub-professor at the Royal Academy of Music in 1826, and later Professor of the Piano, remaining in the post for more than fifty years. His pupils included Charlotte Alington Barnard, William Sterndale Bennett, George Alexander Macfarren, Walter Cecil Macfarren and James William Davison.

Holmes performed as a virtuoso pianist for many years. He composed symphonies, concertos, sonatas, songs and an opera.

== Death ==
Holmes died in 1885, and was buried at Brompton Cemetery.
