= Basil Tozer =

English journalist, author, and hunter (1868–1949)

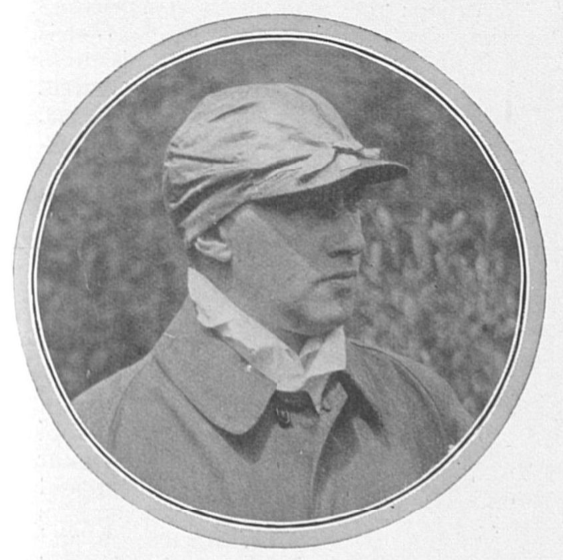
- Tozer in 1908
- Born: Basil John Joseph Tozer; March 1868; Teignmouth, England
- Died: 7 December 1949 (aged 81); Teignmouth, England
- Occupations: Journalist, author, hunter
- Notable work: The Horse in History (1908)
- Spouse: Beatrice Langley (m. 1896)
- Children: 2

Basil John Joseph Tozer (March 1868 – 7 December 1949) was an English journalist, author, and hunter. He was best known for his 1908 history of horsemanship, The Horse in History.

== Early life and education ==
Tozer was born in March 1868 in Teignmouth. He was educated at Beaumont College. Tozer was the son of J. H. Tozer, a solicitor. His brother E. J. Tozer was honorary secretary of the South Devon Hunt.

== Career ==
As a young man, Tozer worked as a journalist and was editor of the Galignani's Messenger newspaper in Paris. He served in the Royal Army Service Corps in France during World War I. After a world tour he joined the staff of the Daily Mail. He worked with Sir Arthur Pearson, 1st Baronet on several of his publications.

Tozer authored articles for The English Illustrated Magazine. In August 1895 he authored a five-page article "The Dogs' Home, Battersea" which included photographs taken by Walter Brock of dogs being euthanised in the Battersea Lethal Chamber.

Tozer's best known work was The Horse in History, an exploration of the role of the horse throughout civilisation. It was described as pleasantly written "sketch of the varying fortunes of the horse through the centuries".

== Hunting ==
Tozer was an avid huntsman but was concerned about unnecessary cruel activities he had observed on hunts. At first he wrote letters on the topic anonymously but later wrote an article under his own name with the title "The Abuse of Sport", published in The Fortnightly Review in 1906. Tozer recounted an act of cruelty involving the use of a gigantic corkscrew to kill a fox. He commented that one of the hunter's servants also carried a triple fish hook. In regard to game hunting, he noted that the beaters and game keepers themselves had thrown birds that were not quite dead into their pockets and game bags. Tozer stated that the reason for calling attention to the abuses was because animal welfare organisations were planning to abolish certain field sports by an Act of Parliament and that if unnecessary cruelty was removed from such sports they would not be abolished.

Between 1907 and 1935, Tozer authored many newspaper articles on hunting. In 1927, he was promoting drag hunting as a replacement for fox hunting. He authored a pamphlet Drag Hunting and Its Possibilities, published by the National Society for the Abolition of Cruel Sports in 1935.

== Personal life and death ==
Tozer married Beatrice Langley, the concert violinist. Beatrice was involved with the women's suffrage movement. They had two sons, Leonard and Philip.

Tozer died on 7 December 1949.

== Selected publications ==
=== Books ===
- Practical Hints On Shooting (1887)
- The Irony of Marriage (With an Introductory Note by C. W. Saleeby, 1908)
- The Horse in History (1908)
- Recollections of a Rolling Stone (1923)
- Confidence Crooks and Blackmailers (1930)
- Drag Hunting and Its Possibilities (1935)

=== Short stories ===
- "The Pioneers of Pike's Peak" (The Strand Magazine, 1897)

=== Hunting articles ===
- Will Drag-Hunting Oust Fox-Hunting? (1907)
- The Practice of Digging Foxes (1909)
- Hunting-Field Problems: How to Make the Most of a Horse (1910)
- Threat to Kill Foxes (1910)
- Tact in the Hunting-Field (1910)
- Hunting on a Small Income (1928)
