= Boosey & Hawkes =

British music publishing company

Coordinates: 51.513°N 0.116°W

- Parent company: BMG
- Predecessor: Boosey & Company; Hawkes & Son
- Founded: 1930; 96 years ago
- Founder: Leslie Boosey; Ralph Hawkes
- Country of origin: United Kingdom
- Headquarters location: London
- Key people: Steven Lankenau (President)
- Imprints: Anton J. Benjamin; Bote & Bock; Hans Sikorski; N. Simrock
- Official website: boosey.com

Boosey & Hawkes is a British music publisher, purported to be the largest specialist classical music publisher in the world. Until 2003, it was also a major manufacturer of brass, string and woodwind musical instruments.

Formed in 1930 through the merger of two well-established British music businesses, Boosey & Hawkes controls the copyright to much major 20th-century music, including works by Leonard Bernstein, Benjamin Britten, Aaron Copland, and Igor Stravinsky. It also publishes many prominent contemporary composers, including John Adams, Karl Jenkins, James MacMillan, Mark-Anthony Turnage, and Steve Reich.

The company is owned by BMG in Nashville and in addition to its headquarters in London has subsidiaries in Berlin and New York.

== History ==
=== Pre-merger ===
Boosey & Hawkes was founded in 1930 through the merger of two respected music companies, Boosey & Company and Hawkes & Son.

The Boosey family was of Franco–Flemish origin. Boosey & Company traces its roots back to John Boosey, a bookseller in London in the 1760s and 1770s. His son Thomas continued the business at 4 Old Bond Street, and from 1819 the bookshop was called Boosey & Sons or T. & T. Boosey.

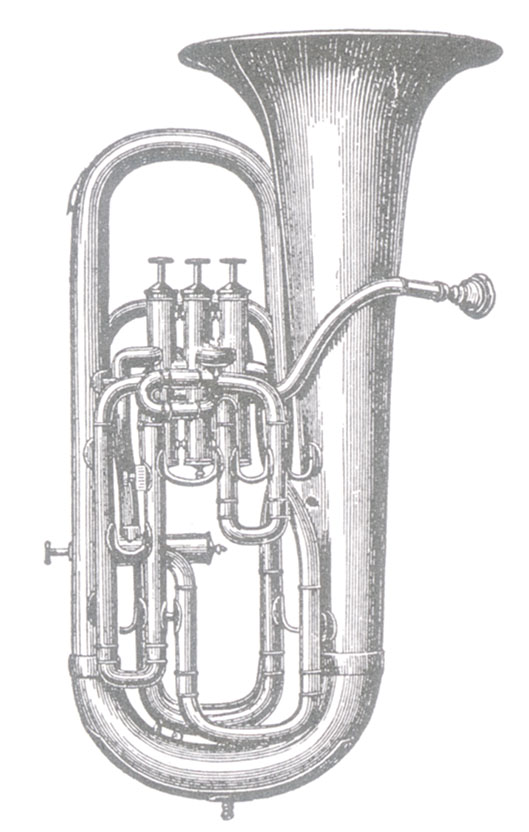
A drawing of a euphonium manufactured by Boosey & Co. in 1878

Thomas Boosey's son, also named Thomas, set up a separate musical branch of the company known as T. Boosey & Co. and, in the latter part of the 19th century, Boosey & Company. It initially imported foreign music but soon began publishing in England the works of composers such as Johann Nepomuk Hummel, Saverio Mercadante, Fanny Puzzi, Ferdinand Ries and Gioachino Rossini, and subsequently important operas by Bellini, Donizetti and Verdi. Elgar and Vaughan Williams were among its later signings. It also produced books; among its first publications was an English translation of Johann Nikolaus Forkel's book Life of J. S. Bach (1820). The company was seriously affected by the House of Lords' decision in Boosey v. Jeffreys (1854) which deprived English publishers of many of their foreign copyrights.

Boosey & Company diversified into manufacturing woodwind instruments in 1851, collaborating in 1856 with flautist R. S. Pratten to develop new designs for flutes. It bought over the business of Henry Distin in 1868, allowing it to begin making brass instruments. Among its achievements was the widely acclaimed design for compensating valves developed by David James Blaikley in 1874. The company also commenced production of string instruments.

The company capitalised on the increasing popularity of the ballad by focusing its publishing activities on them. To promote sales, John Boosey (c. 1832–1893), son of Thomas Jr., established the London Ballad Concerts in 1867 at St. James's Hall and later at Queen's Hall when it opened in 1893. Clara Butt, John Sims Reeves and Charles W. Clark performed at these concerts, and their successes included Arthur Sullivan's "The Lost Chord" (1877) and Stephen Adams' "The Holy City". The company began emphasising educational music from about the end of the 19th century.

In 1874 Boosey & Company moved into offices at 295 Regent Street, where the business was to stay for the next 131 years. In 1892, Boosey & Company opened an office in New York which still exists today. The business eventually owned half of Regent Street, and at the time of the merger was managed by Leslie Boosey.

Hawkes & Son (initially Rivière & Hawkes), a rival to Boosey & Company, was founded in 1865 by William Henry Hawkes selling orchestral sheet music. The company also made musical instruments and spare parts such as reeds, and by 1925 Hawkes had set up an instrument factory in Edgware, North London. The business, which was particularly known for brass and military band music, was eventually inherited by Ralph Hawkes.

=== Post-merger ===
Leslie Boosey and Ralph Hawkes met in the 1920s when they were on the Board of the Performing Right Society, saw an opportunity to combine their businesses, and formed Boosey & Hawkes in October 1930. Hawkes & Son moved from its office in Denman Street to join the Boosey staff at 295 Regent Street.

The 1938 Anschluss—the annexation of Austria by the Nazi regime—led to the Nazification of Viennese publishing house Universal Edition. Boosey & Hawkes seized the opportunity to sign up composers Béla Bartók and Zoltán Kodály, and also rescued Universal's Jewish staff, who later played an important role in developing the company. One such employee in particular, Ernst Roth, facilitated the signing of Richard Strauss and Igor Stravinsky, and was instrumental in the production of Strauss's Vier letzte Lieder (Four Last Songs) (1948; premièred 1950) and Stravinsky's The Rake's Progress (premièred 1951). Another significant figure from Vienna who occupied an editorial role was composer Arnold Schoenberg's pupil Erwin Stein, and after the war the composer Leopold Spinner, a pupil of Anton Webern, was also on the editorial staff. Stein was instrumental in founding the modern-music journal Tempo in 1939, which began as Boosey & Hawkes' own newsletter but later became a more independent publication.

By the time World War II broke out in 1939, Boosey & Hawkes had also signed Benjamin Britten and Aaron Copland. It was Ralph Hawkes who championed Britten when he was still relatively unknown, often against the rest of the board of directors, until the première on 7 June 1945 of Peter Grimes, which was a critical and popular success. Sheet music sales soared during the War, enabling Boosey & Hawkes to buy Editions Russes which held the rights to the most valuable works of Prokofiev, Rachmaninoff and Stravinsky. The company also purchased the lease of the Royal Opera House in London in 1944, rescuing it from becoming a permanent dance hall and providing a venue for world-class ballet and opera in the capital.

By 1950, Boosey & Hawkes was a leading international music company with an extensive catalogue of serious composers and offices in Bonn, Johannesburg, New York, Paris, Toronto and Sydney. However, from the late 1940s, strains had begun to appear in the relationship between Leslie Boosey and Ralph Hawkes, and this led to factions supporting each man forming in the company. It was discovered that Hawkes had borrowed capital of £100,000 during the war without the permission of the exchange control authorities, and Boosey was forced to clear up the situation at great personal cost. Hawkes secretly wanted to buy out the music publishing side of the business and manage it from New York, leaving Boosey in London with the musical instrument business which Hawkes found dull. However, he died suddenly on 8 September 1950, and representation of his faction was taken over by his flamboyant but unreliable brother Geoffrey who spent much of the company's money on ventures such as the manufacture of mouth organs and ovens, which failed. Geoffrey Hawkes also sold shares in the company to fund his philandering, to the point that the company was forced to go public to raise cash. Leslie Boosey allowed Geoffrey his turn as chairman, but within two years the profitable company was on the brink of insolvency and Geoffrey Hawkes died of leukaemia in 1961.

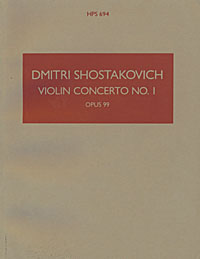
Distinctive brown cover of a Hawkes Pocket Score: Shostakovich's Violin Concerto No. 1

During these difficult years, Boosey was supported by his trusted managing director, Ernst Roth. However, Roth later regarded the Boosey family as ineffectual and parochial. In the early 1960s, Roth forced Boosey's sons Anthony and Simon out of the company, and prevented his youngest son, Nigel, from even joining, allegedly at the behest of Benjamin Britten. Roth and Boosey also had differences over Britten's influence over the company. Roth regarded Britten as a gifted local musician, rather than a true genius like Roth's friends Strauss and Stravinsky. Boosey realised how valuable Britten was to the company, and agreed to Britten's request to divide the company into instruments and publishing. However, Britten humiliated Boosey by preventing him from chairing the music publishing board Boosey had established at Britten's request. In 1963, Britten also managed to get Boosey & Hawkes to employ Donald Mitchell to find new, young composers for the company. Angered by the sway Britten had over Boosey, Roth fired Mitchell within a year. Mitchell later set up Faber Music for book publisher Faber and Faber with the assistance of Britten and the blessing of T. S. Eliot.

Boosey retired from the company in 1964, and died without an obituary in 1979. Although he had been awarded with the Légion d'honneur by France, his achievements were mostly unrecognised in the UK. However, a large number of composers and their estates continue to benefit from his pioneering work in rights and royalty collection. In addition, every two years the Royal Philharmonic Society and the Performing Right Society honour individuals who have made an outstanding contribution to the furtherance of contemporary music in Britain with the Leslie Boosey Award. The award is given to those who work "backstage", such as administrators, broadcasters, educationalists, programmers, publishers and representatives from the recording industry.

Some time during the late 1960s or early 1970s Boosey & Hawkes bought out The Salvation Army Brass Instrument Factory in North London. They continued for some years to manufacture instruments with The Salvation Army name and crest on them such as The Bandmaster cornets.

Boosey & Hawkes' musical instruments division was gradually scaled down from the mid-1970s as it became less viable to have such an extensive range of products. Various lines were outsourced and sold off. By the time of the closure of the Edgware factory in 2001, brass instruments were the only thriving part of the instrument range. Production was moved to Watford, Hertfordshire, and the instruments rebranded Besson.

It took nearly 20 years for Boosey & Hawkes to regain the leading position in the international music scene that it has today. It claims to be the largest specialist classical music publisher in the world.

In 1996 the company acquired Bote & Bock; in 2001, it acquired Anton J. Benjamin, including the N. Simrock catalog.

== Today ==
In 2001, Boosey & Hawkes was put up for sale after accounting irregularities were discovered in its Chicago instrument-distribution business, leading to £13m worth of sales being written off, a plummeting share price, and the company's near-bankruptcy. It was eventually bought by venture capitalists HgCapital in 2003 for £40 million.

On 11 February 2003, Boosey & Hawkes sold its musical instrument division, which included clarinet maker Buffet Crampon and guitar manufacturer Höfner, to The Music Group, a company formed by rescue buyout specialists Rutland Fund Management, for £33.2 million. An archive of musical instruments manufactured or collected by the company throughout its history was passed to the Horniman Museum in Forest Hill, South London.

In September 2005 the company was again offered for sale by HgCapital which announced that it was seeking between £60 and £80 million. One of the interested buyers was Elevation Partners, a private equity firm which counts U2 lead singer Bono as a partner and managing director. Despite offers of about £115 million from a number of parties, the sale was later cancelled in November 2005. In April 2008, Boosey & Hawkes was bought by the Dutch owned Imagem which was subsequently itself acquired by the American based Concord. Concord later purchased Hans Sikorski in 2019, adding the German classical publisher to sit alongside Boosey & Hawkes. In September 2026, Concord merged with BMG.

Today, partly due to the foresight or business acumen of Ralph Hawkes, the company controls the copyrights in major 20th-century music. It also publishes many prominent contemporary composers and the company's New York branch has developed its own catalogue emphasising the works of American composers.

295 Regent Street, which was the home of Boosey & Company since 1874 and of Boosey & Hawkes' publishing business and music shop from 1930, was finally given up by the company in 2005 which then relocated to Aldwych House before relocating in 2026 to its present office in Spitafields. Boosey & Hawkes Music Shop claims to have the UK's largest selection of printed music from all publishers, and operates a worldwide mail order service.

The company had a major division, BooseyMedia, that commissioned and produced music for radio, television and advertising jingles, and the administration of copyrights owned by media companies. This was split into commercial synchronisation and production music departments, both under the Imagem name. The production library was sold in 2016.

In North America, Boosey & Hawkes' print sales catalogue is distributed by the Hal Leonard Corporation.

Boosey & Hawkes launched its Online Scores service in 2011, allowing customers to view full scores of works in its catalogue. In January 2017, British Library acquired the archive of Boosey & Hawkes.

== Parodies ==
The company was lampooned by The Goon Show as "Goosy and Borks" in their episode, "Lurgy Strikes Britain", as well as by musical parodist Peter Schickele who named one of the friends of fictional composer P.D.Q. Bach Jonathan "Boozey" Hawkes, and claimed him as a vital link in the chain whereby manuscripts of PDQ Bach's works had survived. Somewhat more recondite was the punning reference delivered in one of Gerard Hoffnung's parody concerts: "If Boosey's will Hawk it, Schott's will Tippett" (from Punkt Contrapunkt at Hoffnung Interplanetary Music Festival with John Amis, Royal Festival Hall, 21 and 22 November 1958)

== See also ==
- List of companies based in London
