= Francesco Berger =

Italian pianist and composer

Berger c. 1904

Francesco Berger (10 June 1834 – 26 April 1933) was a pianist and composer. He was a piano teacher and a professor at the Royal Academy of Music. He is mostly remembered as the honorary secretary of the Philharmonic Society for 27 years.

== Life and career ==
Berger was born in London on 10 June 1834 to Italian parents, but received British nationality as his father was a naturalized Briton. In 1848 he travelled to Trieste from where his father had originated. He wrote an opera (Il lazzarone, ossia La fortuna vien dormendo) which was performed there when he was seventeen. He received much of his musical education in Germany, where he was taught by Moscheles in a strictly classical tradition, a style of play from which Chopin was later to be the first to break free of. He returned to England in 1855, and in 1864 he married one of the most renowned contraltos of the day, Annie Lascelles.

Berger became a professor of music at the Royal Academy of Music and also taught at the Guildhall School. He composed many pieces of music over a long and industrious life. He became a great friend of Charles Dickens and frequently visited him at his house, Gads Hill Place. He was commissioned to write music for two plays by Wilkie Collins which were produced by Dickens and performed at his private theatrical parties. He composed many works including masses, overtures, operas, chamber music, choral work, piano compositions, song cycles and vocal settings, many to works by Longfellow. He wrote a piano primer, Musical Expressions in Four Languages and an autobiography, Reminiscences, Impressions, and Anecdotes.

In 1871 Berger became of a member and director of the Philharmonic Society and he acted as its honorary secretary from 1884 until 1911, overseeing its move from St James' Hall to Queen's Hall. At the start of that period, Arthur Sullivan was appointed conductor to be followed by various others including Sir Alexander Mackenzie from 1892 to 1899. Mackenzie wrote of Berger "During my tenure of office [as conductor] the heat and burden of the day was borne by an honorary secretary (happily still living) of remarkable linguistic accomplishment, much musical experience, and an immense capacity for work — Mr. Francesco Berger". During his time as secretary, Berger oversaw the introduction of many new works and on several occasions brought Tchaikovsky over to conduct his own works. Near the end of his tenure, the great violinist Kreisler took part in the first performance of Elgar's Violin Concerto in B minor which had been commissioned by the Society.

Berger died in Palmers Green, London on 26 April 1933 at the age of ninety eight. His wife had predeceased him, dying in 1907.
