= James William Davison =

English journalist

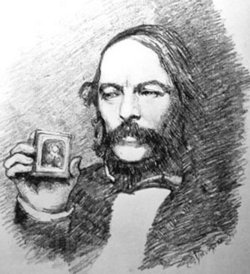
J W Davison – Pencil sketch of a daguerreotype, c. 1857

James William Davison (5 October 1813 – 24 March 1885) was an English journalist, known as the music critic of The Times.

== Life ==
The son of James Davison, of a Northumberland family, and the actress Maria Duncan, he was born in London 5 October 1813. He was educated at University College School and the Royal Academy of Music, where he studied the pianoforte under W. H. Holmes and composition under George Alexander Macfarren.

== Critic ==
Originally with ambitions to be a composer, Davison became first a music teacher, and then in the 1830s a music writer and critic. In 1842 he was a founder of the journal The Musical Examiner, and remained its editor (after it was merged with the Musical World) until his death. In 1846 he became principal music critic of The Times, where he remained until 1879, exercising substantial influence over British musical taste. He also wrote for other journals, including the Pall Mall Gazette and the Saturday Review.

Davison's tastes were conservative and he was a strong advocate of the work of Ludwig van Beethoven, Felix Mendelssohn, Louis Spohr and William Sterndale Bennett, the latter of whom he had befriended at the Royal Academy. He joined Bennett on his first visit to Germany in 1836 where they met Mendelssohn, who had admired Bennett's work in London. Conversely Davison was strongly against the innovations of the composers of the New German School, including Franz Liszt and Richard Wagner, and even towards more conventional composers such as Johannes Brahms and Robert Schumann, although he was an advocate of the work (and conducting) of Hector Berlioz, whom he described as "a great musical thinker" and who dedicated to him his overture Le Corsaire (op. 21, H101)

After the first performance in England of Robert Schumann's Paradise and the Peri he wrote: "Robert Schumann has had his innings, and been bowled out—like Richard Wagner. Paradise and the Peri has gone to the tomb of the Lohengrins."

Visiting the Wagner Festival at Bayreuth in 1876 for the first production of Wagner's Ring cycle, he commented "Wagner...by crushing the buds of melody as they spring up, buds which might blossom into seemly flowers, cramps the manifold resources of expression which are the golden heritage of his art." Davison's antagonism to Wagner was noted by musicologists of the Nazi regime in Germany, and (although he was not of Jewish descent) his name was included in the Nazi handbook Lexikon der Juden in der Musik (Dictionary of Jews in Music), published in 1940.

== Composer ==
Davison wrote orchestral works, one of which, an overture, was played at a concert of the Society of British Musicians. He also wrote and arranged pianoforte music for Bohn's Harmonist, and composed songs, among them settings of John Keats and Percy Bysshe Shelley. The only book he published was a short work on Chopin, which appeared about 1849.

== Family ==
In 1860 Davison married Arabella Goddard the pianist, who had been his music pupil. Following his marriage, Davison was accused of prejudice in his criticism, or lack thereof, towards other women pianists. In particular, he allegedly refused to cover "The Infant Pianist," Sophia Flora Heilbron, whose abilities had been likened to those of his then thirty-two-year-old wife. As Heilbron’s father explained in a letter to the New York Times, Davison devoted "the columns of that journal to the praising of his wife, Miss Arabella Goddard, through motives well understood in London, as the only lady pianiste worthy of estimation."

Goddard and Davison had two sons, one of whom (Henry) edited Davison's papers into memoirs which were published in 1912. Davison died in Margate in 1885.

== Sources ==
- Davison, Henry (1912). Music in the Victorian Era from Mendelssohn to Wagner: Being the memoirs of J. W. Davison, Forty Years Music Critic of "The Times". London: Wm. Reeves. OCLC 671571687.
- Warrack, John (2004). "Davison, James William (1813–1885)". Oxford Dictionary of National Biography (online ed.). Oxford University Press. doi:10.1093/ref:odnb/7301. (Subscription, Wikipedia Library access or UK public library membership required.)
- Eva Weissweiler (1999). Ausgemerzt! Das Lexikon der Juden in der musik ind seine mörderischen Folgen (in German). Köln: Dittrich-Verlag. ISBN 9783920862255.

Attribution This article incorporates text from a publication now in the public domain: Stephen, Leslie, ed. (1888). "Davison, James William". Dictionary of National Biography. Vol. 14. London: Smith, Elder & Co.
