= Concert Allegro (Elgar) =

Piano composition by Edward Elgar

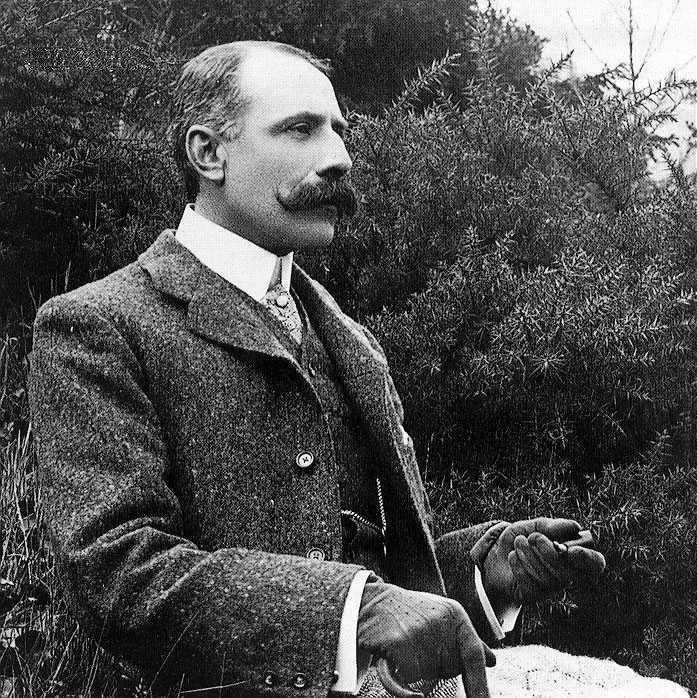
Edward Elgar, c. 1900

The Concert Allegro, Op. 46 by Sir Edward Elgar is a piece of music for solo piano. It takes about 10 minutes to perform. It is the only piano work he wrote that was designed for concert performance. It is in the key of C major and was written in 1901, at the request of the pianist Fanny Davies.

== Background of composition ==
Elgar was not a great lover of the piano, and he was busy organising the first performance of his oratorio The Dream of Gerontius in Düsseldorf. He wrote the piece reluctantly, only after constant pleading from Davies for a new piece for her repertoire. When he did start on it, however, he wrote quickly, and indeed it shows some evidence of hasty composition. Elgar consulted Fanny Davies during the writing of the work, and she made a number of suggestions for improvements, signing her notations "Humbly, F.D.".

== Dedication and first performance ==
Elgar dedicated the Concert Allegro to Fanny Davies, and she gave the first performance at St James's Hall, London, on 2 December 1901, at a concert called "Purcell to Elgar". The critic of The Times described it as "a marriage between Bach and Liszt". (This comment has also been attributed to the conductor Hans Richter.) The first performance has been described as "unconvincing and dubious", and one writer has said Davies "fatally bruised" the work.

== Performance history and revisions ==
In light of these criticisms of Davies' playing and of the work itself, Elgar decided to revise it and shorten it by removing some of the repeats. He also toyed with the idea of converting it into a piano concerto (he even altered the title page from "Concerto [without orchestra]" to "Piano and orchestra"), but this never came to fruition. His later work on a piano concerto, started in 1913, left unfinished at his death and now completed by other hands as Op. 90, was based on unrelated material.

In the meantime, Fanny Davies performed the original version a handful of further times up until 1906. Elgar worked on a revision, without ever completing it, and then the score disappeared. He may have even given it away, not intending to work on the piece any further (he had attempted to publish it but Novello's declined). The music critic of The Times in 1942 claimed to have seen a rough copy of the score. Some time before 1942, the composer and conductor Anthony Bernard was asked to arrange the piece for piano and orchestra, but decided against doing so. Bernard's study was bombed during World War II and many of his papers were destroyed, the score of the Concert Allegro being assumed to have suffered that fate. After Bernard's death in 1963, however, his widow found the manuscript among his papers.

It contained many crossings out, some additions, and a mass of corrections. A performing version was realised by John Ogdon and Diana McVeagh. Ogdon gave the first modern performance of the work, on British television on 2 February 1969. Ogdon also recorded the work and included it in his concert repertoire thereafter. This version has now been recorded by a number of other pianists.

The original score, with all the repeats that Elgar had intended, has been realised and performed by David Owen Norris.

It has also been arranged as a piece for piano and orchestra by Iain Farrington.

== Opus number ==
There is some confusion about the opus number for the Concert Allegro. It appears in reference sources as either "Op. 41" or "Op. 46". Elgar wrote "Op. 41" on the autograph score. At that time he was reserving Op. 46 for a concert overture to be called Falstaff. This work did not see the light of day in that form but became the symphonic study Falstaff in 1913. However, that work was published as Op. 68. In the meantime, he allocated Op. 41 to two songs to words by A. C. Benson. Although never published in Elgar's lifetime, the Concert Allegro was given the opus number 46.
