= Jeanne Douste =

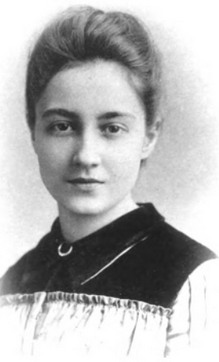
- Born: 4 December 1872; London, England
- Died: 12 July 1968 (aged 95); England
- Occupation: Musician
- Spouse: Edouard Garceau (m. 1901)

Jeanne Douste de Fortis (4 December 1872 – 12 July 1968) was an English child musical prodigy.

== Biography ==
Douste's parents were natives of the French Pyrenees, but she was born in London on 4 December 1872. Neither her father nor her mother possessed any musical ability, but Douste had scarcely attained the age of four when she began to imitate on the piano that which she heard her elder sister play. For some time she played entirely by ear, without any knowledge of music; she actually performed, by heart, Mozart's pianoforte concertos at the Royal Aquarium Concerts, then under the direction of George Mount, with full orchestral accompaniments. It seems, however, that shortly after this period, Douste met with Henri-Louis-Stanislas Mortier de Fontaine, who, noticing the musical instinct of the child, volunteered to take charge of her artistic education. This artist was a friend and pupil of the Frederic Chopin.

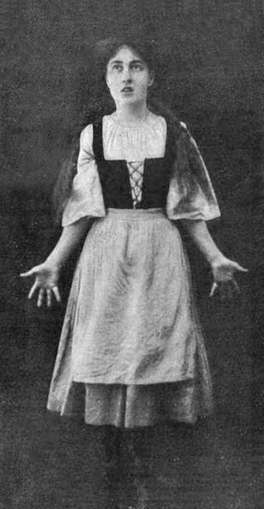
Jeanne Douste as Gretel

In five months, she appeared at a concert given by Sir Julius Benedict at St. James's Hall, where she played three solos, including a fugue of Johann Sebastian Bach and a piece by Robert Schumann. Fontaine continued to remain with Douste's family, and for the next five years, this artist devoted himself to teaching her the piano and the rudiments of harmony. She subsequently studied for three years under George Hendrik Breitner, a well-known pupil of Anton Rubinstein's, and later, she had the advantage of the experience of Leonhard Emil Bach.

At five years of age, Canon Duckworth brought her to the notice of Her Majesty, who, invited Douste to Buckingham Palace, and presented her with a gold cross enriched with pearls. During this season, Douste and her sister, Louise Douste played before the Prince and Princess of Wales at Marlborough House. Shortly after this, Douste was presented to the King of Hanover and the Princess Frederica.

In 1879, the Douste sisters were introduced to Colonel James Henry Mapleson, who at once entered into an engagement with them for a tour in the United States; and at Boston, the girls created quite a furor. The ladies of that city, in honour of the young pianists, formed themselves into a musical society, under the name of the "Douste Club," no fewer than 90 being enrolled, all possessing musical abilities, and meeting weekly for the performance of high-class music. The found success throughout this tour in the US. The sisters Douste paid a second visit to the US in 1886, playing at New York City, Philadelphia, Boston, and the other principal cities, giving 52 recitals. While in America they formed the acquaintance of Henry Wadsworth Longfellow. The poet received them several times at his home, and made frequent commendations of their ability in his memoirs.

In 1877, while staying at Baden-Baden, Jeanne met the Emperor of Brazil, and it was the custom for her to play to him from six to eight o'clock every evening; and on her departure, His Majesty presented her with a handsome bracelet set with diamonds, together with his photograph.

In 1888, Douste visited Brussels, where she played at the Exhibition and at the Cercle artistique de Luxembourg. She subsequently proceeded to Ostend, and at a concert there, Moritz Moszkowski being present, she played this master's "Serenade," at which the composer and pianist were the recipients of an ovation. From Ostend, she went to Baden-Baden, making occasional visits to the Villa Guaita, where she met the Princess of Baden-Baden.

In Paris, Douste formed a friendship with nearly all the musical celebrities of the time. Stephen Heller became fond of Douste, and her family spent many hours each week with this musician.

In the early part of 1889, Douste again performed in Brussels. She was invited several times to play at the Palace, and in recognition of her abilities, she received the appointment of Court pianist to H.R.H. the Countess of Flanders.

She married vocalist Edouard Garceau in 1901.

She died at her home on 12 July 1968.
