= Emily Shinner =

British musician (1862–1901)

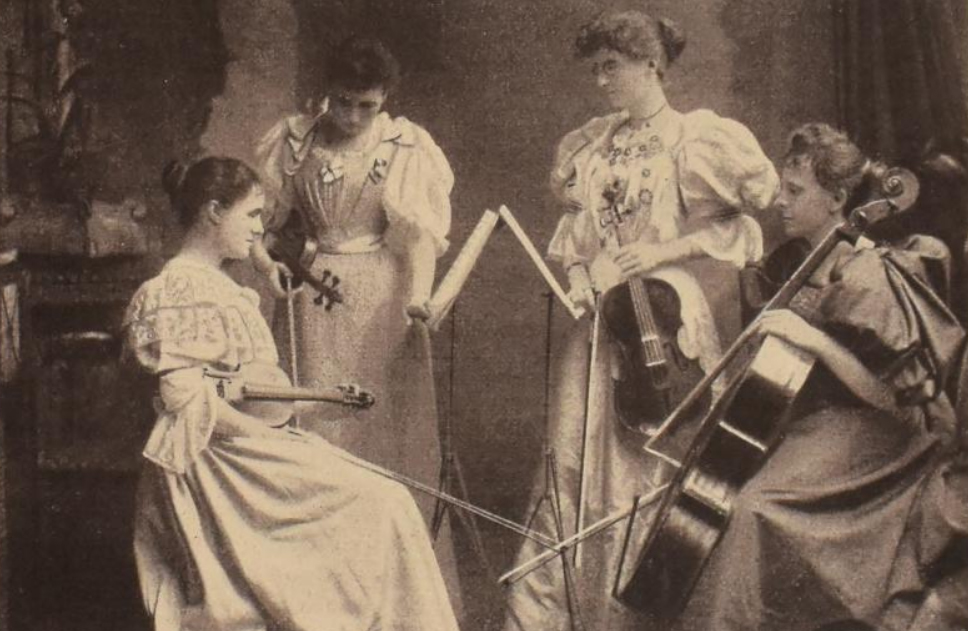
Emily Shinner's string quartet: Shinner (1st violin), Lucy Stone (2nd violin), Cecilia Gates (viola), Florence Hemmings (cello)

Emily Shinner (7 July 1862 – 17 July 1901) was an English concert violinist and academic, and founder of an all-female string quartet.

== Life ==
She was born in Cheltenham in 1862. Her father, Arthur Shinner, was head of the Cheltenham Original Brewery and an amateur musician; he supported her musical education. From the age of seven she had music lessons; she was a student at the Royal Academy of Music, and in 1874 went to Berlin and studied with Heinrich Jacobsen, a pupil of Joseph Joachim. She later studied with Joachim, the first woman to do so.

Shinner's debut in London after completing her studies was in 1882 at Kensington Town Hall, playing the Violin Sonata No. 1 by Brahms and other works. A critic wrote: "Her playing, besides being perfect in every technical respect, is marked by an extraordinary degree of intelligence and true artistic refinement" (The Pall Mall Gazette, 12 June 1882).

In February 1884 she replaced Wilma Norman-Neruda, who was unwell, in a quartet in a Saturday "Pops" Concert in St James's Hall; the event was successful, and made her well known to the public. She appeared in London at the Crystal Palace, Prince's Hall and Queen's Hall, and gave concerts in other cities in England.

=== String quartet ===
She taught violin in the Ladies' Department of King's College London. With colleagues from King's College, she founded the Shinner String Quartet in 1886. The Musical World reported in 1887 (page 277): "A novelty unique of its kind in London, and probably elsewhere, has added a new phase to our musical life in the form of a string quartet composed entirely of ladies." A critic wrote in 1889: "The 'Shinner Quartet' are ambitious; their repertoire appears to include the most modern as well as the standard works of the great masters" (The Musical Standard 1889 I, page 335). The quartet performed in London and elsewhere in England, sometimes with pianist Agnes Zimmermann. In June 1897 Shinner handed over the leadership of the quartet to Gabriele Wietrowetz.

=== Family ===
Shinner married in 1888 Captain Augustus Frederick Liddell. They had three sons: Cecil Frederick Joseph Liddell (1890–1952), David Edward Liddell (1891–1961) and Guy Maynard Liddell (1892–1958).
