= Gabriele Wietrowetz =

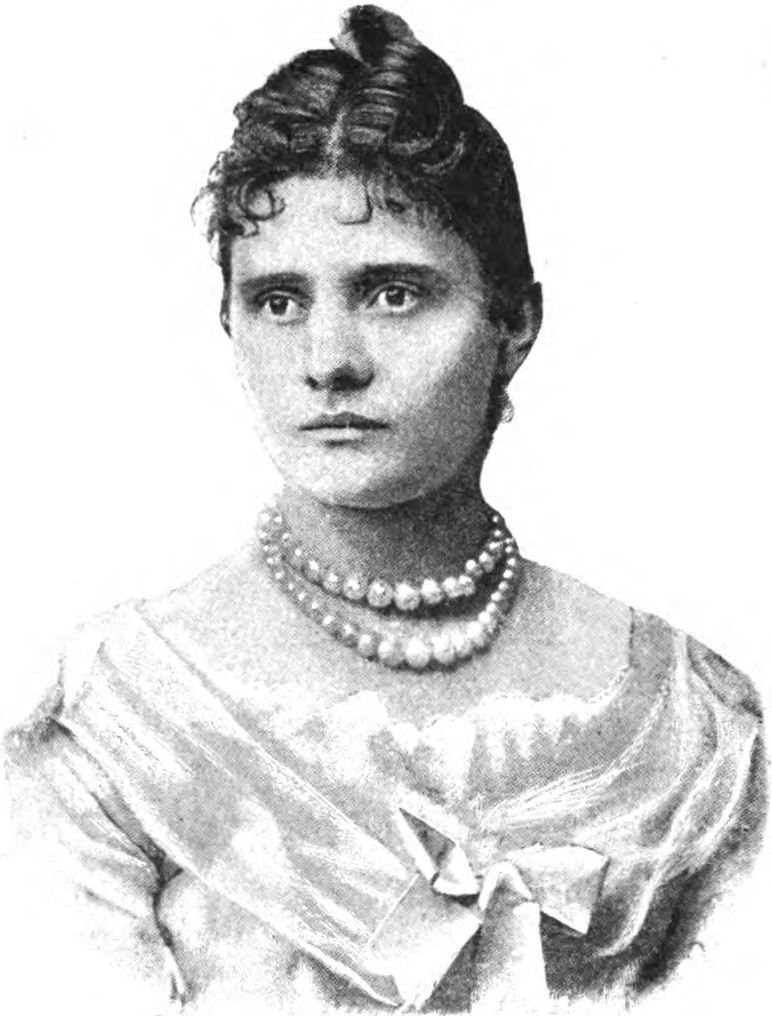

Gabriele Wietrowetz (or Wietrowitz; 13 January 1866 – 6 April 1937) was an Austrian concert violinist and academic. She appeared in many countries in Europe, and led a string quartet in England.

== Life ==
Wietrowetz was born in Ljubljana, daughter of Matthias Wietrowetz, from Bohemia, and his wife Katharina, who was of Italian origin. Her father was a cornet player in a military band. From the age of five she had violin lessons from her father. In the 1870s the family moved to Graz in Styria, where she was taught by Anton Geyer and Ferdinand Caspar at the Schule des Steiermärkischen Musikvereins (School of the Styrian Music Association).

She obtained a scholarship from the state of Styria, and from 1882 to 1885 she studied at the Akademische Hochschule für Musik in Berlin with Joseph Joachim and Emanuel Wirth. In the following years she made concert tours, visiting many European countries. Her repertoire included violin concertos by Beethoven, Louis Spohr (Op. 47), Mendelssohn, Brahms, Max Bruch (Op. 44) and Joachim (Op. 11).

Her London debut was in August 1892 at the Crystal Palace; a reviewer in The Athenaeum wrote: "An extremely favourable impression was made.... United to a fine broad tone and almost faultless technique, Fräulein Wietrowetz possesses a remarkably bright vivacious style...." She remained in England for several months, appearing with the pianist Fanny Davies and giving other concerts. During the following years she spent several months each year in Britain, performing mainly in London. In 1897 she took over, as first violin, the string quartet of Emily Shinner, appearing in England with the quartet until 1901.

From 1901 to 1912 Wietrowetz had a teaching post at the Hochschule für Musik in Berlin; during this time she gave concerts only during vacation periods. She afterwards formed a string quartet with new members, which performed until 1923, and she continued to appear in chamber music concerts after the quartet broke up. She died in Berlin in 1937.
