= St James's Hall =

Concert hall in London (1858–1905)

Coordinates: 51°30′34″N 0°8′12″W

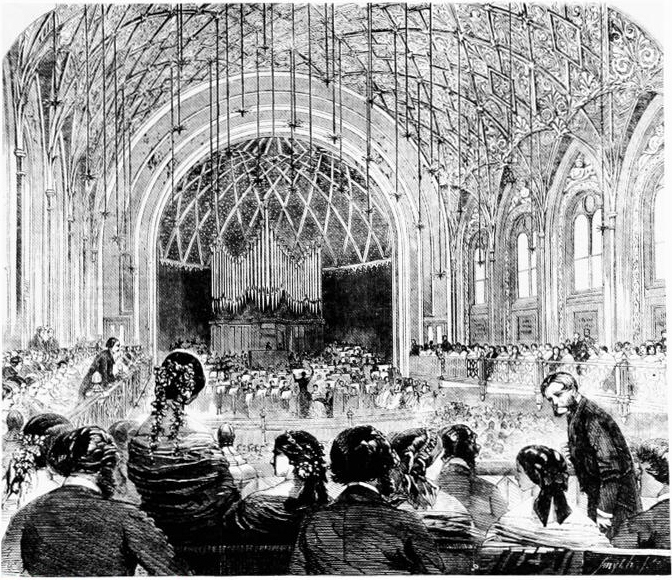
Interior of St. James's Hall, 1858

St. James's Hall was a concert hall in London that opened on 25 March 1858, designed by architect and artist Owen Jones, who had decorated the interior of the Crystal Palace. It was situated between the Quadrant in Regent Street and Piccadilly, and Vine Street and George Court. There was a frontage on Regent Street, and another in Piccadilly. Taking the orchestra into account, the main hall had seating for slightly over 2,000 persons. It had a grand hall 140 feet (43 m) long and 60 feet (18 m) broad. The seating was distributed between ground floor, balcony, gallery and platform and it had excellent acoustics. On the ground floor were two smaller halls, one 60 feet (18 m) square; the other 60 feet (18 m) by 55 feet (17 m). The Hall was decorated in the 'Florentine' style, with features imitating the great Moorish Palace of the Alhambra. The Piccadilly facade was given a Gothic design, and the complex of two restaurants and three halls was hidden behind Nash's Quadrant. Sir George Henschel recalled its 'dear old, uncomfortable, long, narrow, green-upholstered benches (pale-green horse-hair) with the numbers of the seats tied over the straight backs with bright pink tape, like office files.'

The Hall was built jointly by two music publishing firms, Chappell & Co. and Cramer & Co., in the hope of attracting the growing audiences for fine musical performances that attended the Crystal Palace and the halls being built in the provinces. It stood empty for nearly a year after its opening. For almost half a century thereafter, the Hall was London's principal concert hall, to be succeeded by Queen's Hall in the 1900s and later by Wigmore Hall, the Royal Albert Hall and Royal Festival Hall. It became famous for its 'Monday Pops' concerts and Ballad Concerts, as the home of the Philharmonic Society and the Christy Minstrels and for the many famous conductors and performers who gave important performances there.

== Opening ==
The first performance at the hall was The Hymn of Praise, sung by the Vocal Association, under Julius Benedict. Sims Reeves sang Beethoven's 'Adelaide' there (the first of many successes), accompanied by Arabella Goddard, in a concert at the end of May 1858. According to Reeves' biographer, 'The hall itself met with general approval, but the arrangements for chorus and orchestra were severely condemned.' In the same year, one of the first complete performances of J.S. Bach's St Matthew Passion to be heard in England was given there under William Sterndale Bennett, with Sims Reeves, Helen Lemmens-Sherrington, Charlotte Sainton-Dolby and Willoughby Weiss.

== The Christy Minstrels ==
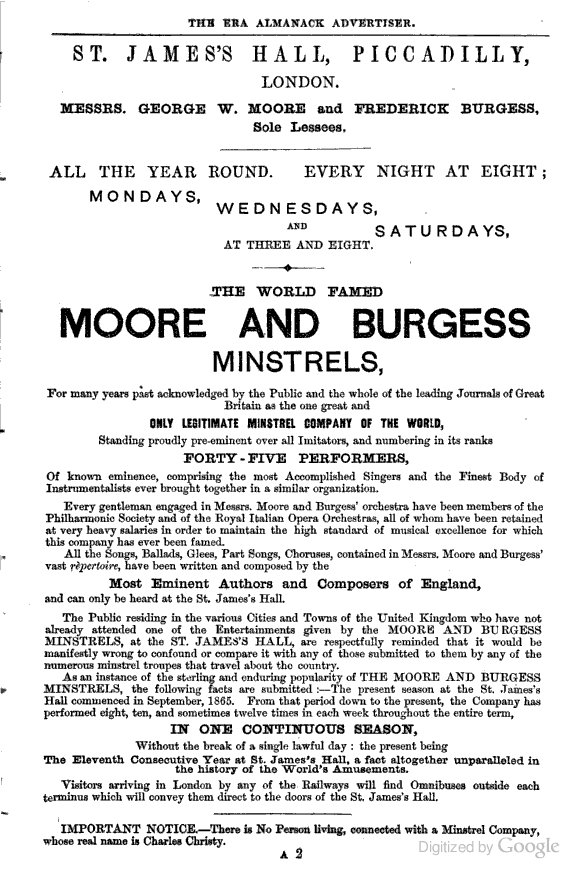
1874 Advertisement

The hall became known for its continuous production of blackface minstrelsy from 1862 until 1904. Known as the Christy Minstrels and later the Moore and Burgess Minstrels, the Hall's resident minstrel troupe performed in one of the smaller halls located on the ground floor near the restaurant, below the main hall. Gilbert and Sullivan's 1893 comic opera, Utopia, Limited, contains a joke in which the Court of St. James's is purposely confused with St. James's Hall and its minstrel shows, and a parody of a minstrel number is included in the same scene.

In residence for the whole active life of the hall, the Minstrels had their permanent home there, but their interests often conflicted with those of the main hall. In January 1890, for instance, George Bernard Shaw wrote:

At the Hallé orchestral concert... I was inhumanly tormented by a quadrille band which the proprietors of St James's Hall (who really ought to be examined by two doctors) had stationed within earshot of the concert-hall. The heavy tum-tum of the basses throbbed obscurely against the rhythms of Spohr and Berlioz all the evening, like a toothache through a troubled dream; and occasionally, during a pianissimo, or in one of Lady Hallé's eloquent pauses, the cornet would burst into vulgar melody in a remote key, and set us all flinching, squirming, shuddering, and grimacing hideously.'

Only a fortnight later, the band, at first subdued, broke out in a 'wild strain of brazen minstrelsy' during the final bars of the funeral march in the Eroica Symphony. After the movement was applauded a member of the audience began calling out that a complaint should be lodged, and won general approval, hear, hear, and people standing up to look at him. On one occasion Lady Henschel and her daughter went to hear Joseph Joachim play at a Saturday 'Pop', but were so aware of the 'rhythmic gay sounds, thumping and shimmering away in a most enlivening manner', that they decided to go and hear Moore and Burgess instead.

== Monday and Saturday 'Pops' and Ballad Concerts ==
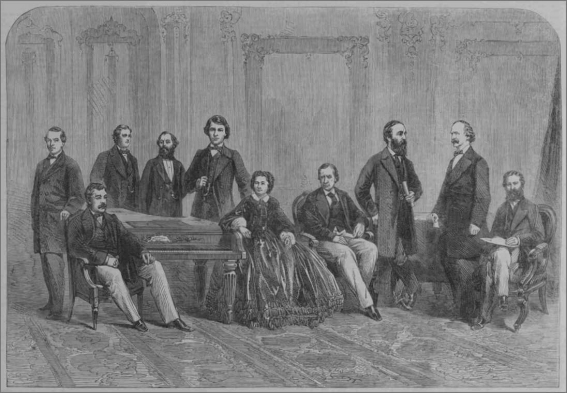
Musicians, from left to right: Lindsay Sloper, Arthur Sullivan, Louis Ries, Henry Webb, Joseph Joachim, Arabella Goddard, Charles Hallé, Arthur Chappell, Prosper Sainton and Alfredo Piatti

Samuel Arthur Chappell, one of the brothers in the Chappell & Co. firm of Bond Street music publishers, who concentrated on selling brass and woodwind instruments, together with his brother Thomas, devised the idea of the Monday Popular Concerts, which established the fame and popularity of the hall. George Bernard Shaw reported that the concerts at the hall contributed greatly to the spread and enlightenment of musical taste in England. Monday 'Pops' were held in the evening, and Saturday 'Pops' on Saturday afternoons. These were chamber-concerts. Their programmes were almost exclusively 'classical', and consisted of piano and organ recital, singers, violinists, string quartets and other chamber ensemble. They were managed by John Boosey, and later by William Boosey, together with Chappell. In 1861 the Musical World observed: 'classical chamber music of the highest order is brought week after week within the reach of the shilling paying masses as it has now been no less than fifty-two times at St James's Hall.... swelling the total of the Monday Popular Concerts to no less than sixty-three within two years of their foundation.... Such a result is unparalleled in the history of musical entertainments.'

George Bernard Shaw gives an interesting narrative of the 'Pops' between 1888 and 1894. Shaw admired the Joachim Quartet, led either by Joachim himself or often by Mme Wilma Norman-Neruda (Lady Hallé) (and later still by Eugène Ysaÿe), with ('modest') L. Ries (2nd violin), ('solemn') Herr Strauss (viola) and the ('gentle') cellist Alfredo Piatti. This was certainly the 'star turn' in that period. They frequently played full works, or even groups of works, at the 'Pops': their larger ensemble was often heard in the Beethoven septet. Among soloists heard in 1888-90 (the 31st and 32nd seasons) were Charles Hallé, Alma Haas (Beethoven op. 110), Agnes Zimmerman (Waldstein), Edvard Grieg, Bernhard Stavenhagen (Schumann Papillons), Arthur de Greef (Chopin), pianists; Joseph Joachim (Brahms), Mme Norman Neruda, (Bach concerto for 2 violins), violin; Bertha Moore, Charles Santley (Erlkönig, To Anthea), Marguerite Hall (Schubert, Brahms, Henschel), singers. The concerts were mixed, often consisting of a chamber-work, some songs, and instrumental solos.

The Hall became known for the "London Ballad Concerts", which began in the 1860s and moved in January 1894 to Queen's Hall. They "were started... by Messrs Boosey 'for the performance of the CHOICEST ENGLISH VOCAL MUSIC by the MOST EMINENT ARTISTS'."

== The Philharmonic Society ==
The Philharmonic Society of London, founded 1813, until 1869 gave its concerts in its rooms at Hanover Square, which had seating for only about 800. The Society decided to move permanently to St James's Hall, and a complimentary additional concert, held at St James's Hall, was given to its subscribers at the end of the 1868–69 season. Charles Santley, Charles Hallé, Thérèse Tietjens and Christina Nilsson were the soloists. When the move was made, the Society remodelled its charges to obtain a wider audience and compete with the Crystal Palace and other large venues, and introduced annotated programmes. The Society remained at the hall until 28 February 1894, when it moved to the Queen's Hall.

There were major events in 1870–71, when a Beethoven centenary season was held, with all nine symphonies performed. The bust of Beethoven by Johann Nepomuk Schaller was presented to the Society and collected (in Pest, Hungary) by Sir William Cusins. It was exhibited at the Society's first concert in 1871, and a replica was placed at the front of the platform at every Philharmonic concert thereafter. The Society's Gold Medal incorporated an image of the bust. Another major event of 1871 was the original presentation of medals to ten distinguished musicians.

=== Notable Philharmonic performers at St James's Hall ===
In 1871, Charles Gounod conducted a concert of his music. In 1873 Brahms's A German Requiem had its English premiere; Edward Lloyd first sang before the Society; and Hans von Bülow made his London debut, playing Beethoven's "Emperor" concerto and Bach's Chromatic Fantasia and Fugue. In 1874, Pablo de Sarasate and Camille Saint-Saëns played there, and in 1875, August Wilhelmj. Other Philharmonic Society highlights of the next few years included performances by George Henschel, Xaver Scharwenka, Émile Sauret, Joseph Joachim and Edward Dannreuther.

Changes of management were introduced in 1881 following the Society's recovery from a financial crisis. Concerts were moved from Monday to Thursday evenings, to make way for the Monday Night Popular Chamber-Concerts, known as the 'Pops'. The 1881 season included two performances of Berlioz's Roméo et Juliette; Scharwenka gave the British premiere of his Piano Concerto No. 2, and Eugen d'Albert and Emma Albani appeared before the Society. Over the next two years many choral works were given with the Philharmonic Choir, including works by Franz Liszt, Anton Rubinstein, Weber, Beethoven and Brahms.

In 1883, Cusins retired as conductor, and for one season there was a team of honorary conductors. Antonín Dvořák conducted his Sixth Symphony (although it was referred to as "Symphony No. 1") in March 1884. Sir Arthur Sullivan conducted the concerts of 1885–87, and as guest conductors, Dvořák, Moritz Moszkowski and Saint-Saëns were heard in works written for the Society. Among the soloists were Tivadar Nachéz, Fanny Davies, Lillian Nordica, Ella Russell, Emma Nevada, Józef Hofmann and František Ondříček. Most notably Saint-Saëns's Symphony No. 3 (Saint-Saëns) written at the behest of the Society, and premiered there on 19 May 1886.

F. H. Cowen succeeded Sullivan as conductor from 1888–92. In his first season Edvard Grieg played his Piano Concerto in A minor and Pyotr Ilyich Tchaikovsky made his first appearance before an English audience, introducing two works. Johan Svendsen and Charles-Marie Widor also conducted in that season, and Clara Schumann made her farewell performance to the Society. Tchaikovsky returned in 1889 to conduct his Piano Concerto No. 1 with Wassily Sapellnikoff making his English debut (who three years later created a furor with the Liszt E flat concerto); and Agathe Backer-Grøndahl and Eugène Ysaÿe also made their English debuts. In 1890, Dvořák conducted his Fourth Symphony. Paderewski, who gave four recitals at St. James's Hall for his début in 1890, returned there for the Society in 1891 to perform the Saint-Saëns' C minor, and the Rubinstein D minor, concerti. Leonard Borwick and Frederic Lamond also performed there for the Society. Cowen gave many concerts of contemporary English composers such as Sullivan, Hubert Parry, Alexander Mackenzie, Charles Villiers Stanford, and of his own works.

In 1892 Alexander Mackenzie succeeded Cowen. In the 1893 season, Tchaikovsky gave the English premiere of his Fourth Symphony, Saint-Saëns conducted his Le Rouet d'Omphale and played his G minor concerto, and Max Bruch conducted his own Second Violin Concerto with Ladislas Gorski as soloist. In November 1893, a presentation was made to the Society's Secretary Francesco Berger in appreciation of ten years service. Soon afterwards, Queen's Hall opened its doors, and the Society moved there in the following February.

== Subscription Concerts ==
Hans Richter often conducted Richard Wagner concerts at St. James's Hall, beginning in 1877. These 'Orchestral Festival Concerts' (established regularly in 1879 by the violinist Hermann Franke), which commenced after Easter, were among the chief rivals to the Philharmonic Society programmes. At the time of Arthur Sullivan's resignation of the Philharmonic conductorship, the Society suggested to Richter that he might become its conductor, and the two series of concerts might be amalgamated under the Society's supervision. Richter did not accept the plan.

In addition to Richter's series, there was also a nine-year winter series of subscription concerts established and conducted by George Henschel, including a full cycle of Beethoven symphonies in one year, and a rare performance of Richard Wagner's Symphony. The content was planned against a 'permanent background' of Beethoven and Brahms. Helen Henschel refers to 'the famous Wagner cat' which inhabited the Hall. It was said to walk onto the stage during rehearsals whenever any work by Wagner was being played, but never otherwise.

Shaw refers to both, noting that Richter's concerts were too expensive, and that Henschel's orchestra was too small.

== Readings by Charles Dickens ==
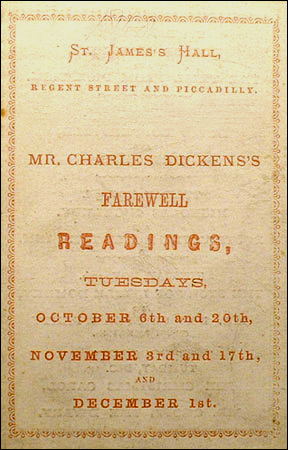
1868 Program book for the series of Dickens readings

In 1868, famed Victorian author Charles Dickens presented a final series of "Farewell Readings," at the hall, which commenced on the evening of October 6, with a program devoted to "Doctor Marigold" (from the Christmas Story) and "The Trial" from Pickwick. He had settled with his tour managers, Chappell & Co., on 100 readings for the princely sum of £8,000. Attendees would receive printed programs and Chappell's advertisements included the following statement:

It is scarcely necessary for Messrs. CHAPPELL and Co. to add that any announcement made in connexion with these FAREWELL READINGS will be strictly adhered to and considered final; and that on no consideration whatever will Mr. DICKENS be induced to appoint an extra night in any place in which he shall have been once announced to read for the last time.

The stalls were priced at five shillings, balcony seats at three, and general admission at one shilling. A new amenity, sofa stalls ("of which there will be a limited number only"), went for seven shillings.

The following year Dickens would have to cut a provincial tour short after collapsing showing symptoms of a mild stroke in Preston on 22 April 1869. When he had regained sufficient strength, he arranged, with medical approval, for a series of readings to partially make up to Chappell & Co. what they had lost due to his illness. There were to be twelve final performances, running starting on 11 January 1870 back at the hall. Dickens would give his last public reading here at 8:00 pm on the 15 March 1870. He died shortly thereafter on 9 June, having suffered another stroke.

== Other uses ==
The Bach Choir, established in 1875 under a founding committee including Sir George Grove and Sir John Stainer, had as a primary aim the introduction to England of Bach's Mass in B Minor. With a choir of between 200 and 250 voices, including the Swedish Nightingale, Jenny Lind, and under the baton of her husband, conductor Otto Goldschmidt, the Mass came to performance in April 1876 at St James's Hall, and a second performance was given a month later.

Henry J. Wood performed the E minor organ concerto of Ebenezer Prout at the Hall with an orchestra under Joseph Barnby, in the late 1880s. Although the performance earned him much praise, he referred to the instrument as 'that terrible box of whistles at St. James's Hall'. This had not seemed to bother Camille Saint-Saëns when he premiered his third Symphony there (in which two sections make extensive use of the organ) in 1886. Saint-Saëns was a fine organist, and was titulaire of Église de la Madeleine in Paris. If he had any objections to the organ of St. James Hall for the premier of his symphony, they do not appear in his writings.

The Stock Exchange Orchestral Society, founded 1883, originally played in the Prince's Hall Piccadilly, but transferred to St. James's Hall until 1894, when they moved to Queen's Hall. In December 1893 Harry Plunket Greene and Leonard Borwick began their celebrated partnership in lieder recitals at the hall, which continued well into the new century. In 1895, the 16-year-old pianist Mark Hambourg gave a concert there under Henry J. Wood, in which he played three piano concerti.

The First Internationale would use the hall as their meeting place.

== The end of the Hall ==
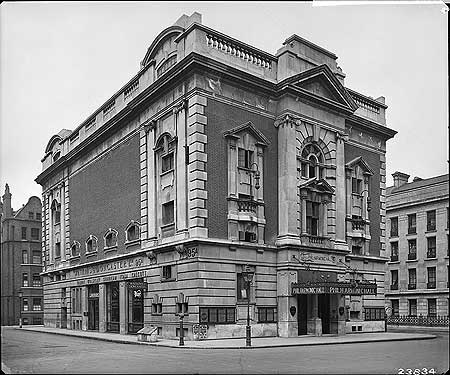
The Philharmonic Hall (originally the new St James's Hall) in Great Portland Street as it appeared in 1917.

The Chappell ballad concerts were being managed by William Boosey in 1902, when the hall was owned by a private company. The controlling share was held by T. P. Chappell, chairman of Chappell's: he turned down a good offer to buy the hall because Boosey felt strongly about its old connection with the Saturday and Monday 'Pops' and the Chappell ballad concerts. But Chappell died in June 1902, and the other shareholders accepted a new offer without consulting Boosey, who was badly put out. Then Queen's Hall came into the market, and a friend of Boosey's acting in that interest pointed out that Queen's Hall would be worth much more if St James's Hall ceased to operate. Boosey realised that Messrs Chappell could benefit most by becoming lessors of Queen's Hall, and it was immediately arranged with the result that Chappell's controlled Queen's Hall from 1902 down to 1944. The 11-year-old violinist Franz von Vecsey made his English debut at St James's Hall in April or early May 1904. It continued in use until February 1905 when it was demolished. The Piccadilly Hotel was afterwards built on the site.

== 1907 building ==
A new St. James's Hall at Great Portland Street, (on a site previously occupied by St Paul's Church) had its foundation stone laid by the Lord Mayor and Sherriffs on 20 April 1907. It opened on 25 April 1908 with a series of promenade concerts performed by the newly formed St. James's Hall Orchestra under the musical directorship of Mr. Lyell Taylor.
