= John Boosey =

John Boosey was a bookseller in 18th century London. He stocked foreign-language titles and also ran a circulating library on King Street. His son Thomas Boosey continued the business. The Boosey family remained in the publishing industry and in 1930 formed Boosey & Hawkes, music publisher.

== See also ==
- Book trade in the United Kingdom
