= Lindsay Sloper =

English pianist and composer (1826 - 1887)

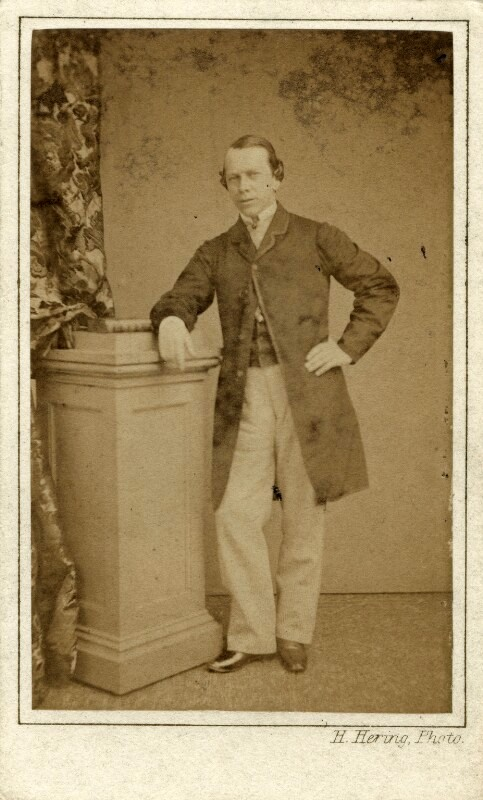
Lindsay Sloper by H. Hering

Lindsay Sloper (full name Edward Hugh Lindsay Sloper; 14 June 1826 – 3 July 1887) was an English pianist and composer.

== Life ==
Sloper was born in London in 1826. After studying the piano in London under Ignaz Moscheles, he went, around 1841, to Aloys Schmitt in Frankfurt, and later to Georg Jacob Vollweiler in Heidelberg and Xavier Boisselot in Paris. He remained in Paris until 1846, when he returned to London. He appeared occasionally as a pianist at the concerts of the Musical Union (1846) and the Royal Philharmonic Society (1849), of which he subsequently became a member. He claimed to have taught Jane Stirling, and to have introduced her to Frédéric Chopin.

A reviewer of a concert in 1847 (one of many of his concerts reviewed in The Musical World) wrote: "Mr. Sloper's powers of expression and unerring mechanism were more finely developed in the Sonata Apassionata of Beethoven than in any other part of the programme. The last movement was taken with extraordinary rapidity, but the energy, precision and finish of the performer's style were preserved throughout with undiminished power."

As his teaching connection grew, his public appearances waned. A reviewer of a concert in 1868 wrote: "Mr. Sloper of late years has appeared much too rarely in public; and yet few belonging to the profession of which he is a member can bring forward more honourable credentials. A composer and pianist of distinguished ability, Mr. Sloper is one of the small number who have never deviated from the right path, but, looking at art from a serious point of view, have treated it accordingly." That same year the child prodigy pianist Sophia Flora Heilbron would perform for Sloper's Grand Morning Concert, and would, for a short period, come under his tuition.

Ultimately he devoted himself entirely to teaching, for which his services were in constant demand. Sloper was a prolific composer, chiefly for the piano. They include a sonata for violin and piano, twenty-four studies op. 3, twelve studies op. 13, and a Technical Guide to Touch, Fingering and Execution on the Pianoforte.

Sloper died in London on 3 July 1887.
