= Fanny Davies =

British pianist (1861–1934)

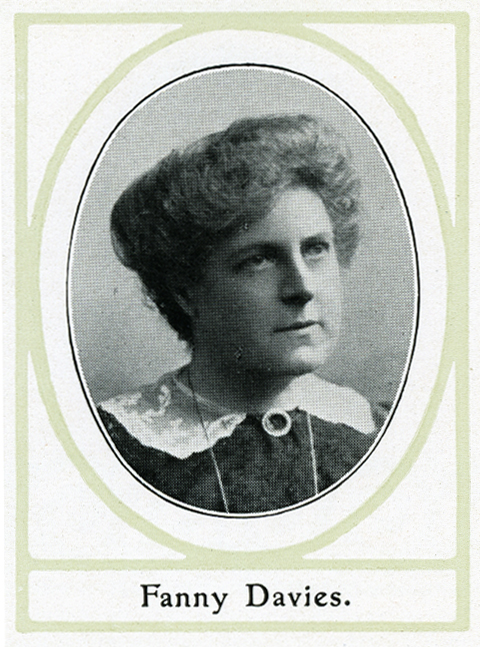
- Fanny Davies c. 1909
- Born: June 27, 1861; Guernsey, Bailiwick of Guernsey, United Kingdom
- Died: September 1, 1934 (aged 73); London, England
- Education: University of Music and Theatre Leipzig
- Occupation: Pianist
- Years active: 1867-1934

Fanny Davies (27 June 1861 – 1 September 1934) was a British pianist who performed works by Beethoven, Schumann, Brahms, and early schools. She was also a very early London performer of the works of Debussy and Scriabin. In England, she was regarded as the "successor" of Arabella Goddard, though her style and technique differed from Goddard's considerably. She died, aged 73, in London, England.

== Life and Career ==
=== Early Years ===
Fanny Davies was born in Guernsey, United Kingdom, on 27 June 1861. She was sent to live in Birmingham with her aunt Miss Woodhill as a toddler, who ran a 'flourishing ladies' school in that city'. Davies first started learning piano at the age of three and had her first formal lessons when she was five. At the age of six and a half, she reportedly played Piano Sonata No. 31 (Beethoven) at Birmingham Town Hall.

She received tuition in Birmingham from Charles Edwin Flavell, and briefly took violin lessons from Henry Hayward, known as the 'Wolverhampton Paganini'. On visits to London she met with Charles Hallé, who encouraged her to pursue her studies more formally.

In 1882, Davies then began studies at Leipzig Conservatory under Carl Reinecke and Oscar Paul, though she remained for only a year. After appealing through letters to Clara Schumann to teach her, Schumann suggested she move to Frankfurt, try to enter Hoch Conservatory, at which point she would then accept Davies as her pupil. Davies gained entry and was taught by Schumann privately, and studied fugue and composition under Bernhard Scholz, then director of the Conservatory.

=== Return to London and Public Performances ===
Her first major concert in London was given on 17 October 1885 at the first Saturday Concert of the 1885-1886 season at The Crystal Palace. Davies played Piano_Concerto_No._4_(Beethoven), conducted by August Manns. She had in fact performed one concert at the venue as a 'trial performance', where Manns assessed her suitability for the more high profile event. Nonetheless, the October date became known as her professional debut, and was widely praised. One newspaper noted:

'The neatness of her execution, the conscientious musician-like performance, the intelligence of the conception, not exactly a sufficient volume of sound, a correct irreproachable technique, chromatic scales and shakes of great evenness and purity, a left hand of considerable development, no pedal, no blurring, her piano of great charm, and her forte of no thumping - all this together forms rather an unusual array of great qualities.'

She then became a frequent performer in the Saturday and Monday Popular Concerts during 1885, the Philharmonic concerts 1886; Berlin, 1887; Gewandhaus, Leipzig, 1888; Rome, 1889; Beethoven Festival in Bonn, 1893; Vienna Philharmonic, 1895; Milan, 1895 and 1904; Paris, 1902, 1904 and 1905; Netherlands, 1920 and 1921; Prague, 1920 and 1922; and Spain 1923. She was frequently engaged by the Royal Philharmonic Society, making her last appearance in its programme at age 15. In November 1915, with Thomas Beecham as her conductor, she performed Mozart's G major Concerto, K. 453. She appeared in a Mozart concerto during Beecham's London debut at the Bechstein (Wigmore) Hall on 5 June 1905.

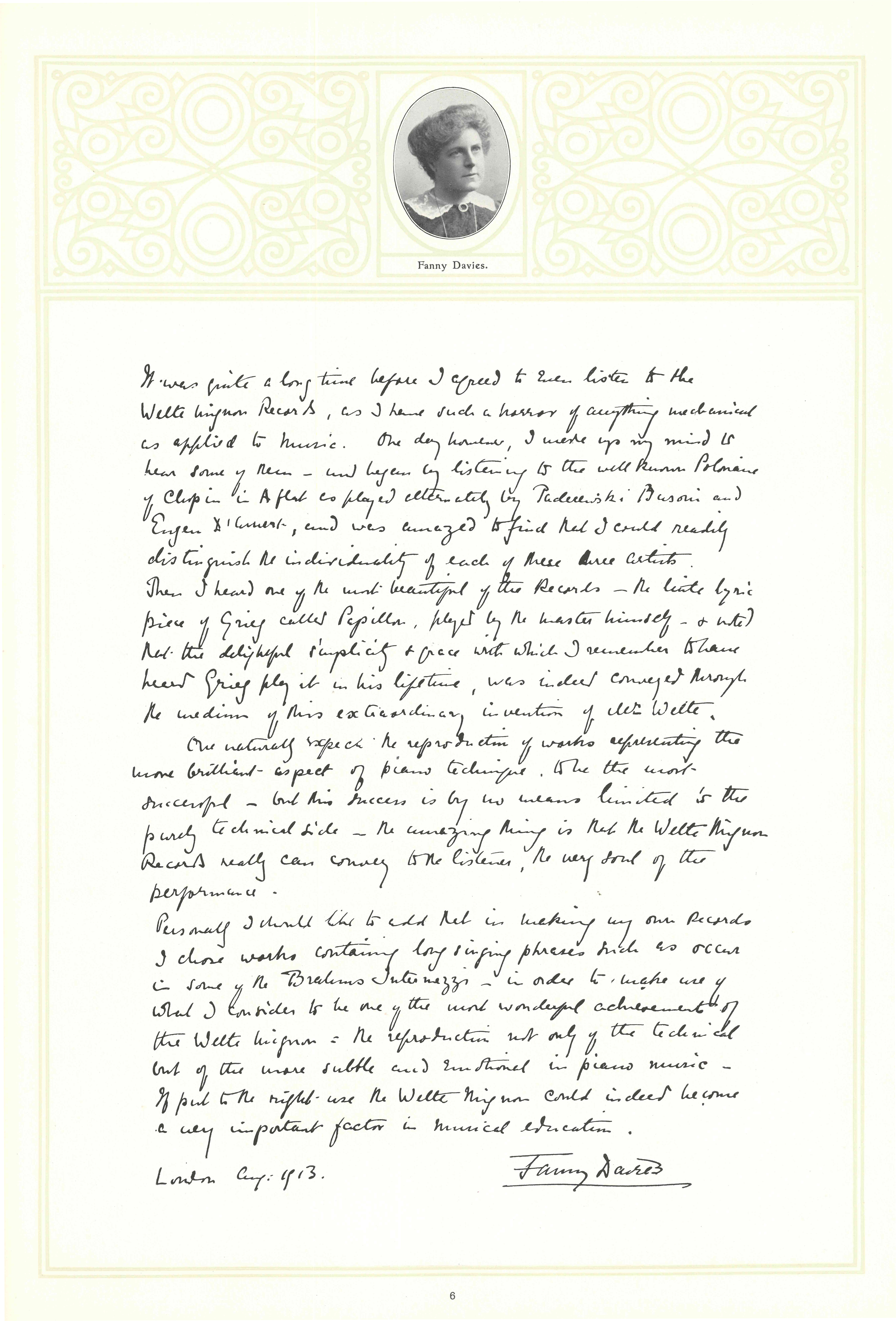
Writing from Fanny Davies

Her once-popular late 1920s recording of Schumann's Piano Concerto in A minor represents a direct tradition from the composer.

Davies was also admired in chamber music, playing often in trio with Joseph Joachim. In 1892 (28 March, 2–4 April), she appeared with Richard Mühlfeld and Alfredo Piatti in the first London performances of the Brahms Clarinet Trio in A minor, Op. 114, when the Joachim Quartet with Mühlfeld was also performing the Clarinet Quintet in B minor, Op. 115. She also gave the first London performance of Brahms's D minor Violin Sonata, also with Joachim. She accompanied Joachim in the Brahms Hungarian Dances in April 1892. She was accompanist for lieder recitals given in 1894–6 by the baritone David Bispham, in Schumann and Brahms (including the Op. 112 Liebeslieder); and in Brahms lieder for Gervase Elwes and Marie Brema on their German tour in 1908.

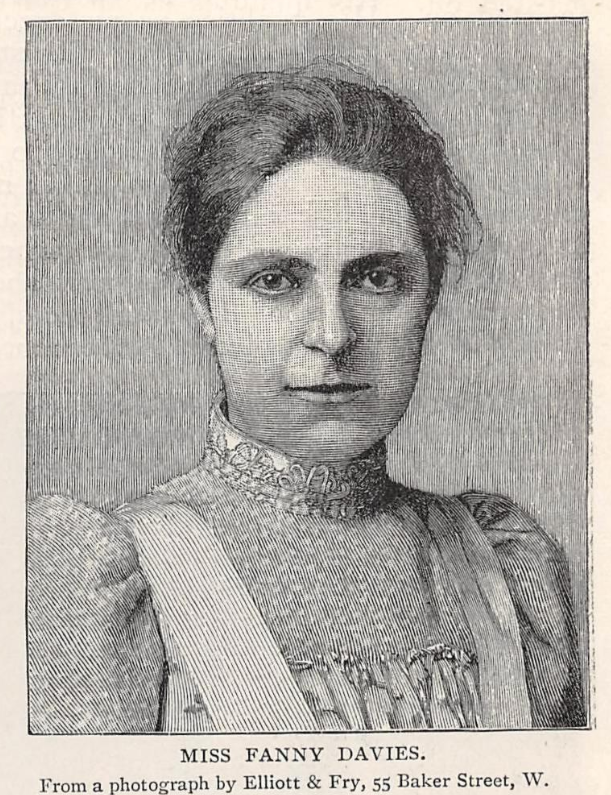
Etching from a photograph c.1891

Fanny Davies was the first person to give a piano recital in Westminster Abbey. She also gave the first public performance of Edward Elgar's Concert Allegro, Op. 46, in 1901. The piece was written only after constant requests from her for a new piece, and was dedicated to her. Her performance, however, attracted negative reviews, and it may have even been what caused Elgar to revise the work, a revision he never finished (the score was lost from around 1906 until 1968).

== Reception ==
In 1891, George Bernard Shaw described Davies as a "wild young woman". In May 1892, after a performance of Beethoven's Choral Fantasia, he wrote: "To those who cannot understand how anybody could touch a note of that melody without emotion, her willing, affable, slap-dash treatment of it was a wonder". In her accompaniment of Joachim in the Brahms Hungarian Dances (April 1892), Shaw referred to her "curious tricks and manners which so often suggest wicket-keeping rather than piano-playing". However, a year later, he called her Crystal Palace performance of the Chopin F minor concerto "the most successful feat of interpretation and execution I have ever heard her achieve".

In around 1891, Herman Klein wrote that she "embodied in a remarkable degree the unique qualities of the romantic school of which ... Clara Schumann was admittedly the most spontaneous and finished exponent. The success of these two native artists was destined to afford great encouragement to rising students both in England and on the continent. It also helped to create among the general mass of amateurs a taste for pianoforte playing of a more warm-blooded type than had hitherto satisfied them", making her similar in that regard to Leonard Borwick (another Clara Schumann pupil and accompanist in lieder to Harry Plunket Greene). Davies also published musicological articles (e.g. on Schumann's music, Musical Times August 1911, and on Brahms's own playing and tempo in the C minor Piano Trio, Op. 101, in Cobbett's Cyclopedic Survey of Chamber Music) and gave musical lectures. An article about her appeared in the Musical Times for June 1905.

Harold C. Schonberg observed, "behind her neat, controlled, tasteful playing one can see the specter of Clara [Schumann]".

== Recordings ==
- Schumann: Kinderscenen. Columbia Records C-L2321/2, 2×12" records, 4 sides.
- Schumann: Davidsbündlertänze, Op. 6, omitting nos 3, 7, 15 and 16. Columbia Records C-67797/9D (Alb CM-142), 3×12" records, 6 sides.
- Schumann: Concerto for piano and orchestra in A minor, Op 54. with Royal Philharmonic Orchestra under Ernest Ansermet. Columbia Records, C-67580/3 (in Alb CM-114) or C-9616/9, in Darrell but deleted c. 1936.
- On 28 March 1909 Fanny Davies recorded 14 piano rolls in London for Welte-Mignon.

== References and Sources ==
==== Sources ====
- D. Bispham, A Quaker Singer's Recollections (New York 1920).
- R.D. Darrell, The Gramophone Shop Encyclopedia of Recorded Music (New York 1936).
- A. Eaglefield-Hull, A Dictionary of Modern Music and Musicians (Dent, London 1924).
- W. Elwes & R Elwes, Gervase Elwes (London 1935).
- W. Murdoch, Brahms (Rich and Cowan, London 1933).
- H.C. Schonberg, The Great Pianists (London 1964).
- G.B. Shaw, Music in London 1890–1894 (London 1932).
