= Arabella Goddard =

English pianist (1836–1922)

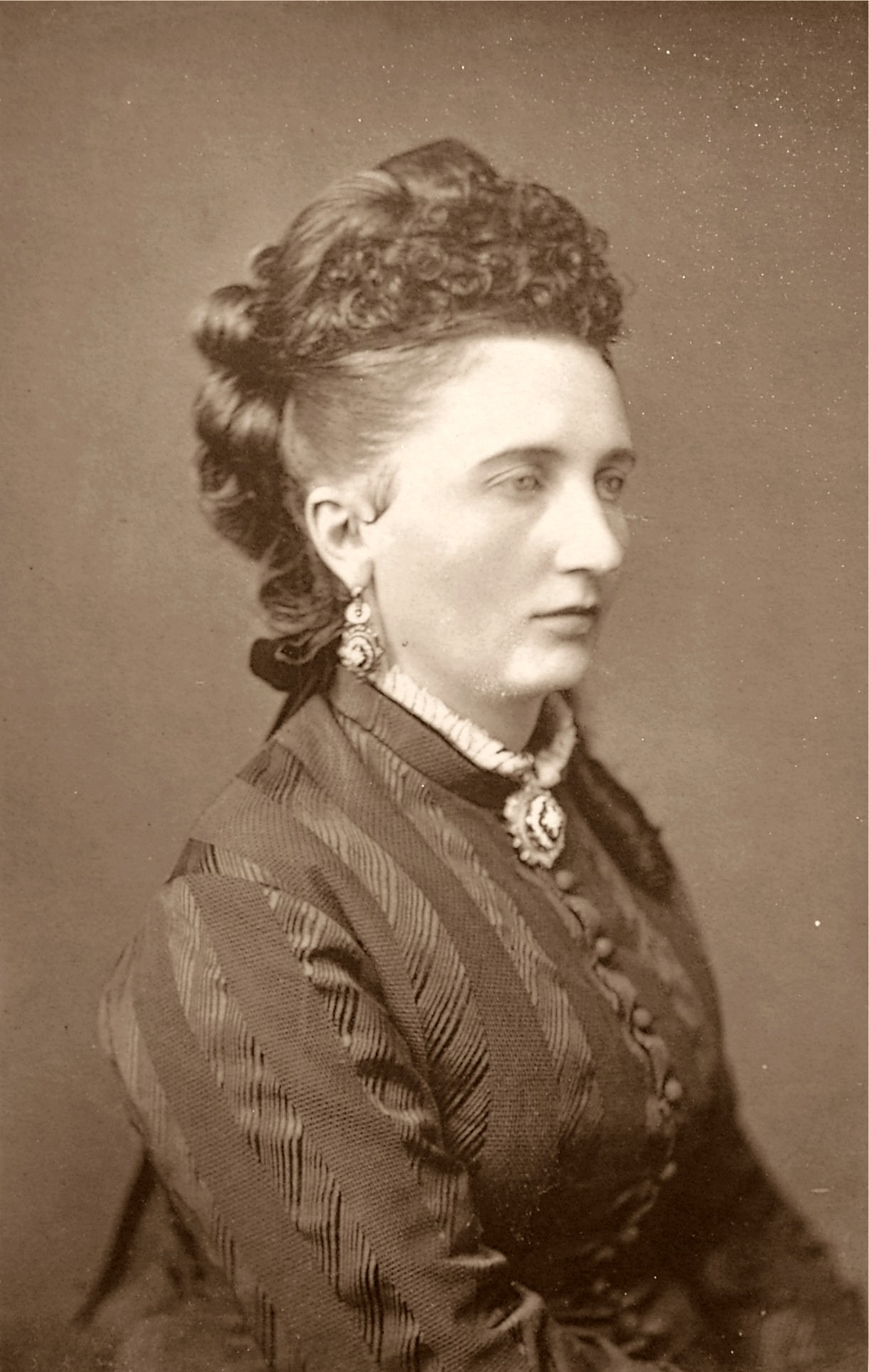

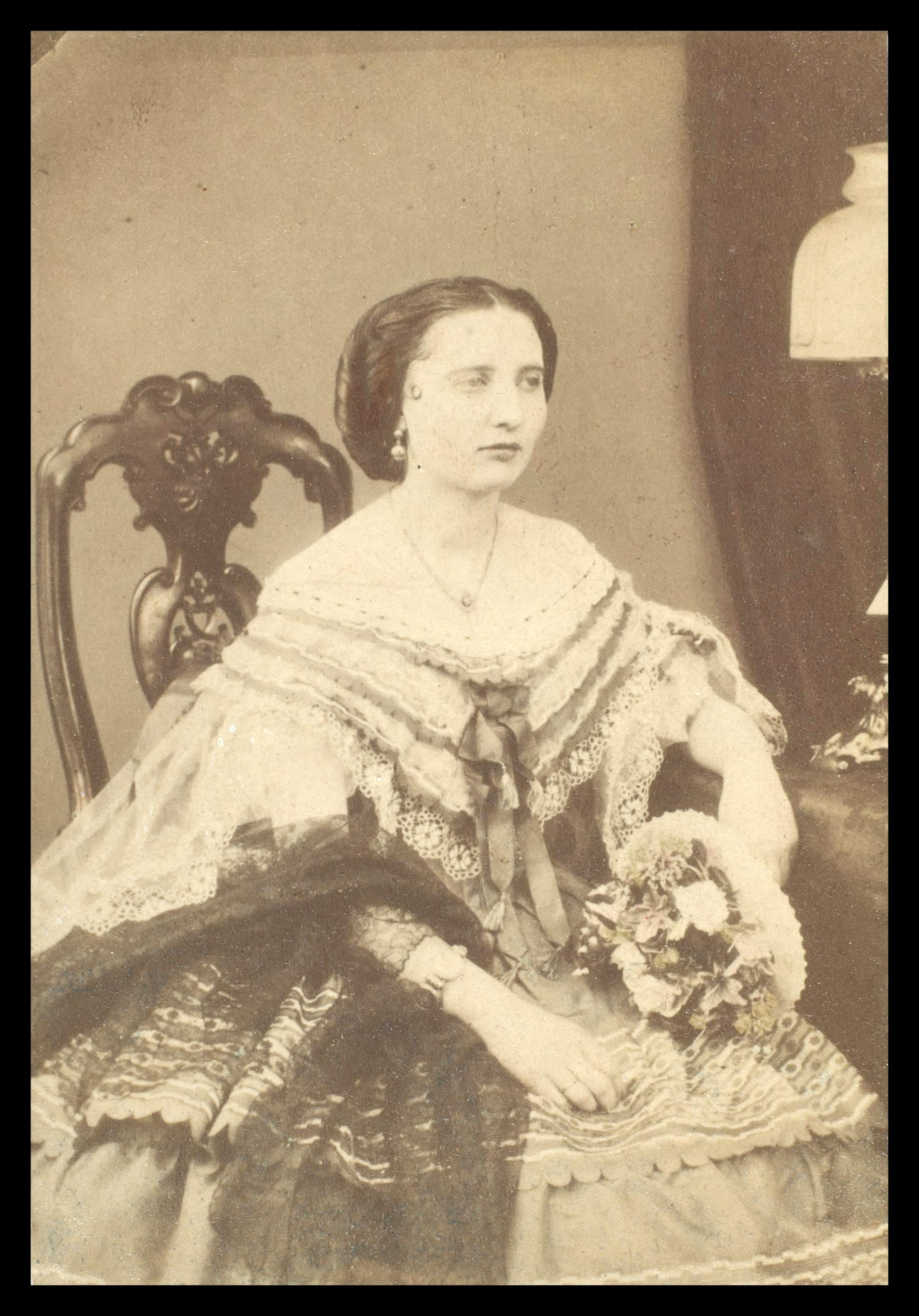
Goddard circa 1860

Arabella Goddard (12 January 1836 – 6 April 1922) was an English pianist.

== Early years ==
She was born and died in France. Her parents, Thomas Goddard, an heir to a Salisbury cutlery firm, and Arabella née Ingles, were part of an English community of expatriates living in Saint-Servan near Saint-Malo, Brittany. She remained very proud of her French background all her life, and spiced her conversation with French phrases.

At age six she was sent to Paris to study with Friedrich Kalkbrenner. She was feted as a child prodigy and played for the French royal family and Frédéric Chopin and George Sand (she would later also play for Queen Victoria). Her family suffered financial distress during the 1848 Revolution and had to return to England; there, Arabella had further lessons with Lucy Anderson and Sigismond Thalberg. She first appeared in public in 1850, under the conductor Michael William Balfe, at a Grand National Concert at Her Majesty's Theatre.

Thalberg sent her to be tutored by James William Davison, the chief music critic for The Times. She made her formal debut on 14 April 1853, playing Beethoven's "Hammerklavier" Sonata, the first time the work had been performed in England. She spent 1854 and 1855 in Germany and Italy. She played at a concert at the Leipzig Gewandhaus and was very favourably received by the German critics.

She was one of the first pianists to play recitals from memory, although her concerto appearances were with the score in front.

== Career ==
Goddard returned to England and gave concerts with the Philharmonic Society at the Crystal Palace and at the Monday Popular Concerts. In 1857 and 1858 she played all the late Beethoven sonatas in London, most of which were still complete novelties to her audiences, and many other works.

In 1859 she married her mentor J. W. Davison. She was 23, he 46. In 1871 she was in the first group of recipients of the Gold Medal of the Royal Philharmonic Society.

From 1873 to 1876 she conducted a major tour, organised by Robert Sparrow Smythe, of the United States, Canada, Australia, New Zealand, India, Shanghai, Hong Kong, Singapore and Java. In America, the critics were less impressed by her playing of romantic music, but liked her classical playing. This may have been due to Davison's influence on her: he did not approve of any composers after Mendelssohn.In spite of this, Goddard performed works by Emma Macfarren, Anna Caroline Oury, and Jane Roeckel. In June 1874, while returning to Townsville, Queensland, from Java, her ship, the RMS Flintshire, ran aground on to the Great Barrier Reef off Townsville, and she had to spend a night in an open boat in torrential rain with the trapeze artist Charles Blondin, who was also arriving for an Australian tour. In October 1875, she appeared in New York City with Thérèse Tietjens.

In England, George Bernard Shaw was struck by her ability to play the most complex pieces. He described Teresa Carreño as "a second Arabella Goddard". She retired from performing in 1880.

== Later career ==
She was appointed a teacher at the Royal College of Music in 1883, its first year of operation.

A number of composers dedicated pieces to her, including William Sterndale Bennett's Piano Sonata in A-flat, Op. 46 "The Maid of Orleans". She herself composed a small number of piano pieces, including a suite of six waltzes.

== Personal life ==
After the birth of her two sons Henry and Charles, she separated from her husband, who died in 1885. She died at Boulogne-sur-Mer, France, on 6 April 1922, aged 86.

== Broadwood piano ==
Goddard took an iron framed Broadwood piano, built for the Vienna Exposition, on her international tours. It was involved in the RMS Flintshire stranding on 26 June 1874, where the ship's captain used the piano to ballast the ship, in a successful attempt to prevent the vessel from tipping over. The ship was refloated and the piano made its way around Australia. However Goddard was involved in a few arguments during her tour, and at one point the piano was held hostage by the disgruntled manager of the Sydney theatre in which she got into a dispute, in August 1874.

The piano then made an appearance in an auction in London in 1875, when it was purchased by the industrialist Lord Armstrong. The cost was 250 guineas, equivalent now to £26,000 in 2025 terms. This extraordinary sum was perhaps due to Lord Armstrong being something of a fan of Goddard. The piano was installed at Lord Armstrong's home in Cragside, near Rothbury in Northumberland. At some point after 1901 the piano left Cragside. The piano was placed in a auction in 2006, this time for a much lower sum, £85. The new owners realised the historic significance of the piano, and gave it to the National Trust, who now run Cragside. The piano was reinstated in Cragside's drawing room in July 2025, 150 years after its first appearance there, and in working order, The piano is now on show to the public.

== Sources ==
- Grove's Dictionary of Music and Musicians, 5th ed, 1954.
- Markus Gärtner, Art. "Goddard, Arabella", in: Lexikon "Europäische Instrumentalistinnen des 18. und 19. Jahrhunderts", hrsg. von Freia Hoffmann, 2010.
