= Lurline (opera) =

Opera by Vincent Wallace

- Grand romantic opera by William Vincent Wallace
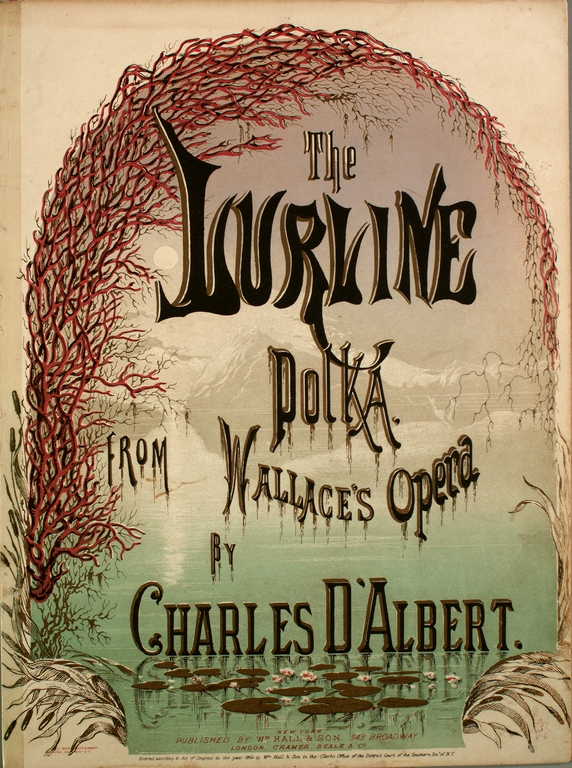
- Cover of the score, published shortly after the premiere
- Librettist: Edward Fitzball
- Language: English
- Based on: legend of the Lorelei
- Premiere: 23 February 1860; Theatre Royal, Covent Garden, London

Lurline is a grand romantic opera in three acts composed by William Vincent Wallace to an English libretto by Edward Fitzball. It was first performed on 23 February 1860 at the Theatre Royal, Covent Garden, by the Pyne and Harrison English Opera Company with Louisa Pyne in the title role. The libretto is based on the legend of the Lorelei.

== Background and performance history ==
Wallace may have conceived the idea for Lurline during a trip on the Rhine river and began writing the opera while he was in Vienna in 1847 to supervise the production of Maritana. It was to have premiered in the 1847/48 season at Covent Garden, but the project was shelved, and the opera left incomplete at this time. Wallace did not return to the opera until 1854 in the USA, when the opportunity of a premiere at Berlin arose, but that too did not materialise, and the work was shelved again until 1859 when he further elaborated the score for its upcoming premiere by Pyne and Harrison's Royal English Opera at Covent Garden.

Lurline premiered in its full version on 23 February 1860 at the Theatre Royal, Covent Garden, conducted by Alfred Mellon. It was an outstanding success with both the public and the critics. The Illustrated London News of 3 March 1860 wrote "this piece is not only the chef d'oeuvre of the composer but may challenge a comparison with the best German, Italian or French dramatic music of the present day", although it also noted that "the simplicity and wild horror of the tale are entirely lost amid the melodramatic absurdities of the cockney school." The Pyne and Harrison English Opera Company who had staged the work for its premiere revived it again at the end of the season and in the following season as well. The opera then premiered in Dublin on 30 April 1861 and in Sydney in 1862.

Lurline was presented in a concert performance in Cambridge, Massachusetts on 1 June 1863, and received its first fully staged American performance in New York on 13 May 1869 at the Academy of Music, followed by a production in Chicago on 14 October 1870. The opera was revived in New York in 1898 when it had a brief run at the American Theatre. Lurline was toured in Britain in the 1880s and early 1890s by the Carl Rosa Opera Company and the Moody-Manners company. There was also a revival at London's Drury Lane on 12 April 1890. However, by the 20th century, the opera had fallen into obscurity.

Neither Wallace, who died in 1865, nor his widow ever profited from the initial success of Lurline. In 1858, two years before its premiere, Wallace sold the English performing rights for the opera to the Pyne and Harrison company for 10 shillings which he then handed over to the widow of a carpenter in the Covent Garden Theatre. It was estimated that Pyne and Harrison's company made at least £50,000 from its various productions.

Following its premiere, twelve of the main arias and duets from Lurline were published as parlour songs in The Vocal Gems of William Vincent Wallace's Grand Romantic Opera Lurline. Several composers produced fantasias on the score, including René Favarger and Wilhelm Kuhe. Lurline's music also found its way into two popular dance arrangements by Charles d'Albert – Quadrille: Sail! Sail! on the midnight gale, and The Lurline Polka.

A concert performance in Dublin in July 2024 (the first in that city since 1939), of the complete score without any cuts, was conducted by Péter Halász with Rachel Kelly in the title role, Luis Gomes (Count Rudolph) and Ashley Riches (the river king) and the National Symphony Orchestra; it was uploaded to Youtube and made available as a CD set.

== Roles ==
Louisa Pyne, the first Lurline

Roles, voice types, premiere cast
Role	Voice type	Premiere cast 23 February 1860 Conductor: Alfred Mellon
Lurline, a Rhine nymph	soprano	Louisa Pyne
Count Rudolph, a young nobleman	tenor	William Harrison
Wilhelm, Count Rudolph's friend		Charles Lyall
Rhineberg, the River King	baritone	Charles Santley
Baron Truenfels		George Honey
Ghiva, the Baron's Daughter	mezzo-soprano	Pilling
Zelieck, a gnome	bass	Henry Corri
Liba, a spirit of the Rhine		Fanny Cruise
Conrad		Friend
Adolphe		Mengis

== Synopsis ==
Act 1

In his underwater grotto, King Rhineberg laments the absence of his daughter, Lurline, and berates the gnomes for allowing the beautiful nymph to wander in the upper world. Lurline returns playing her harp and sings of having fallen in love with Count Rudolph whom she had seen sailing on the river. Meanwhile, Count Rudolph, an extravagant young man, is hoping to improve his fortunes by marrying Ghiva, the daughter of Baron Truenfels. Unbeknownst to the young Count, Ghiva and her father are not at all wealthy and are hoping to improve their fortunes by her marriage to the Count. When Ghiva discovers their mutual poverty, she calls off the engagement. The count returns to his life of revelry to drown his sorrows. During one of these revelries in his half-ruined castle, Lurline appears and places a ring on his finger. Rudolph immediately falls in love with her. When she leaves, he follows her to the river and sets out in his boat to find her. A large storm arises, King Rhineberg and the water spirits cause the boat to disappear into a whirlpool.

Act 2

The magic ring Lurline had given Rudolph allows him to survive underwater, and he is now living in Lurline's palace beneath the Rhine. Lurline and Rudolph sing of their love and happiness and the joys of wine. Meanwhile, back in the Baron's castle Ghiva regrets having broken off the engagement and sings a lament for her lost Rudolph. Back in Lurline's palace, Rudolph expresses nostalgia for his old friends and his castle. Lurline allows him to return for three days and take with him some of the Rhine treasure. Nevertheless, she is overcome with grief and a sense of foreboding at his departure.

Act 3

On Rudolph's return, Ghiva is attracted by Rudolph's new wealth and determines to marry him. She steals the magic ring and throws it into the Rhine. Without the ring, Rudolph goes back to his life of revelry, forgetting Lurline and his promise to return to her. While Lurline laments Rudolph's broken promise, his friends, envious of his new wealth, plot to murder him and plunder his castle. When Lurline's attendants find the ring and bring it to her, she goes to a feast that Rudolph is holding on the river bank. There, she berates him for his desertion, and he is once again enchanted by her. Ghiva, desperate to win back Rudolph, tells him of his friends' plot and urges him to flee with her and the Baron instead, but he refuses. Lurline then calls on the spirits of the Rhine to save her lover. The river suddenly rises and drowns the conspirators. Rudolph, wearing the magic ring again, is spared and when the waters subside, he is carried back down to Lurline's palace where they are to live happily ever after.

== Recordings ==
Complete recording:

- Performed by Sally Silver (soprano), Fiona James (mezzo), Bernadette Cullen (mezzo), Keith Lewis (tenor), Paul Ferris (tenor), David Soar (baritone), Donald Maxwell (baritone), Roderick Earle (bass), Victorian Opera Northwest Chorus and Orchestra, Richard Bonynge (conductor), on: Naxos 8.660293-4, CD (2010).

Excerpts include:

- the orchestral overture, on the album British Opera Overtures, performed by Victorian Opera Northwest Orchestra, Richard Bonynge (conductor), on: Somm Célèste SOMMCD 0123, CD (2013).
- the arias The Night Winds and The Naiad's Spell, performed by Deborah Riedel (soprano), Australian Opera and Ballet Orchestra, Richard Bonynge (conductor), on the album The Power of Love: British Opera Arias, on: Melba 301082, CD (2000).

See also Wallace's own piano work The Night Winds – Nocturne for piano from Wallace's Lurline, recorded by Rosemary Tuck (piano) on the album William Vincent Wallace: Opera Fantasies and Paraphrases, Naxos 8.572774, CD (2011).

== Sources ==
- Bonynge, Richard, "What happened to Lurline?", liner notes to Lurline, Naxos Records, 2010
- Brisbane Courier, "Summary of the News", 6 June 1890, p. 4.
- Davidson, Gladys, Two Hundred Opera Plots, originally published in 1911 and republished in facsimile by Bibliobazaar, 2008, pp. 430–432. ISBN 0-554-53255-7
- Flood, W. H. Grattan, William Vincent Wallace: A Memoir, Published at the offices of The Waterford News, 1912. pp. 24–27
- Graves, Perceval, "William Vincent Wallace", Gramophone Magazine, July 1928, p. 4.
- Rosenthal, H. and Warrack, J. (eds.), "Wallace, William Vincent" in The Concise Oxford Dictionary of Opera, 2nd edition, Oxford University Press, 1972, p. 539
- Wisgast, Wilfrid (ed.), "The Habitue: Royal English Opera", The Players, Vol. I, No. 10, 3 March 1860, pp. 76–77.
