= The Desert Flower =

- Opera by William Vincent Wallace
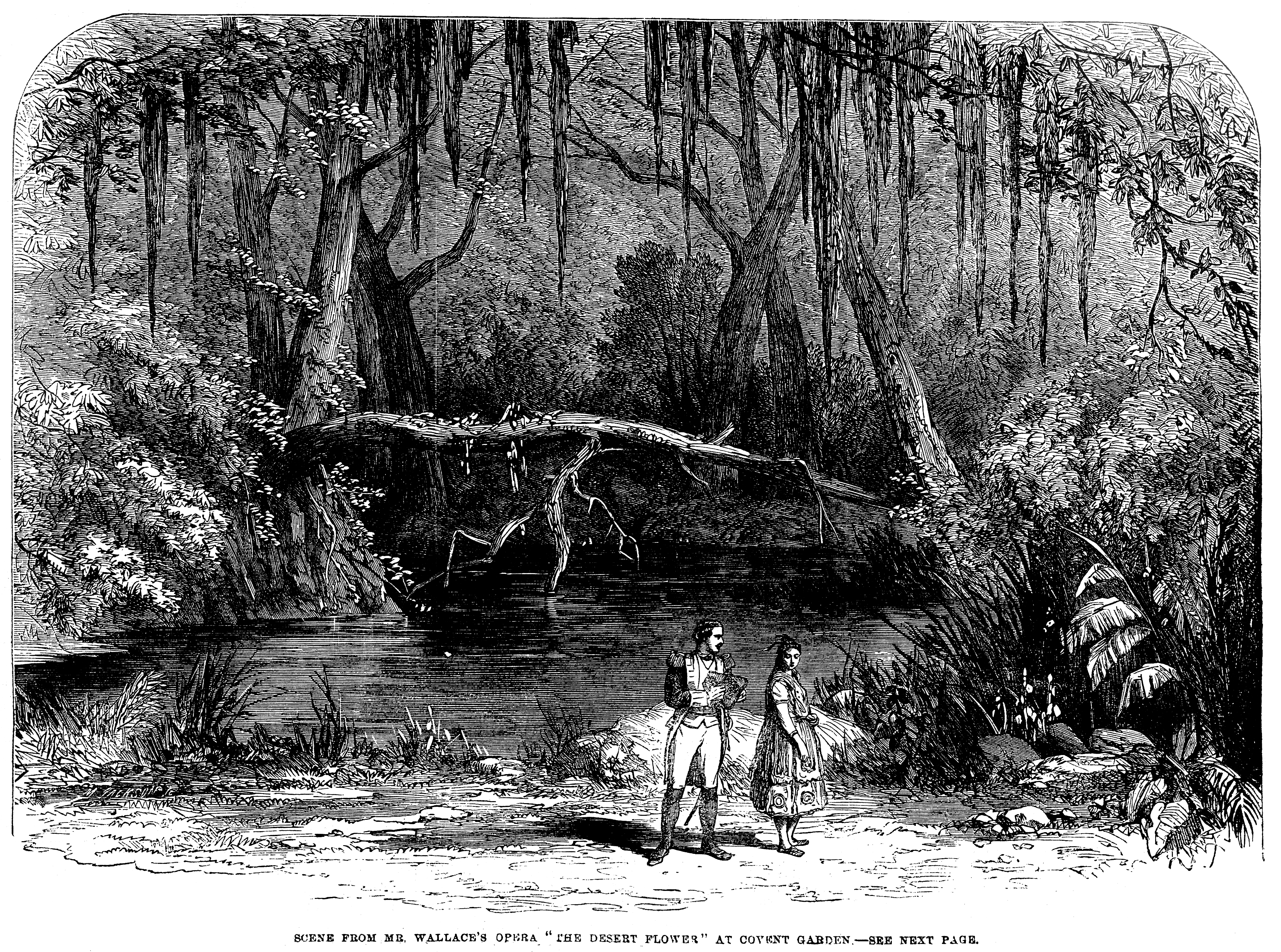
- Act II, Scene 1 from the original production
- Librettist: Henri Saint-Georges; Adolphe de Leuven
- Language: English
- Based on: libretto for Jaguarita l'Indienne
- Premiere: 12 October 1863; Theatre Royal, Covent Garden, London

The Desert Flower is an opera in three acts composed by William Vincent Wallace. The libretto was an English translation and adaptation by A. Harris and Thomas J. Williams of the libretto by Henri Saint-Georges and Adolphe de Leuven for Halévy's Jaguarita l'Indienne. The Desert Flower premiered on 12 October 1863 in London at the Theatre Royal, Covent Garden in a performance by the Pyne and Harrison English Opera Company with Louisa Pyne in the title role.

== Background and performance history ==
Both Halevy's Jaguarita l'Indienne and The Desert Flower probably owe their origins to the factual account by Captain John Gabriel Stedman of his adventures in Surinam/Dutch Guiana, titled The Narrative of a Five Years Expedition against the Revolted Negroes of Surinam (1796). The last opera to be completed by Wallace, its premiere on 12 October 1863 at Covent Garden opened the 8th and final season of Louisa Pyne and William Harrison's English Opera Company. The Prince of Wales was in the audience, and Louisa Pyne herself sang the role of Oanita, with Harrison as Captain Maurice. A contemporary review pronounced the songs "pretty" and the music "pleasing" but noted that "there are no passages which, by their brilliancy and sweetnesss, raise the work to the heights which the composer has achieved in some of his former operas."

The opera was not a particular success with audiences either, and was withdrawn after two weeks. The Desert Flower received its US premiere at New York's Academy of Music on 12 January 1868 with Caroline Richings as Oanita and William Castle as Captain Maurice. Wallace's opera is all but forgotten now, but the overture is occasionally played in concerts. Wilhelm Kuhe composed a Fantasia for piano based on its score, and in 1867 its main arias and duets were published as parlour songs in The Vocal Gems of William Vincent Wallace's Romantic Opera The Desert Flower.

== Principal roles and premiere cast ==
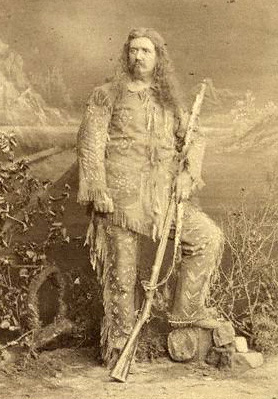
Willoughby Weiss photographed in 1863 as Casgan in The Desert Flower

Role	Voice type	Premiere cast 12 October 1863
Oanita	soprano	Louisa Pyne
Captain Maurice	tenor	William Harrison
Major Hector Van Pumpernickle	bass	Henry Corri
Casgan	bass or bass-baritone	Willoughby Weiss
Sergeant Peterman	bass	Thomas Aynsley Cook
Eva	contralto	Susan Pyne

== Synopsis ==
Although based on Halévy's Jaguarita l'Indienne, some of the plot details were altered by Harris & Williams. The opera is based in Surinam/Dutch Guiana, where the Dutch settlers are under attack by the local Anakawtas Indian tribe, led by their beautiful queen, Oanita, and her henchman and admirer, Casgan. The settlement is protected by two Dutch officers, the brave Captain Maurice and a reluctant new arrival, Major Hector Van Pumpernickle (who provides the comic relief). Matters become complicated when Oanita and Captain Maurice fall in love. This leads to the enmity of Casgan, and a tryst by the lovers is interrupted by him, and results in the capture of Maurice, who refuses Casgan's request to betray his comrades and countrymen. Oanita however allows Maurice to escape, and is, in turn, about to be put to death by her enraged tribe when she is rescued by Maurice and his soldier band, resulting in the death of his rival Casgan. Thus all ends happily with the lovers reunited, leading to the restoration of peace between settlers and Indians.

== Main arias and duets ==
- 'Through the pathless forests drear'
- 'Swift as dart'
- 'The wood bird's song'
- 'The pangs of unrequited love'
- 'Why did I leave my country dear'
- 'Though born in woods'
- 'Dance ye lithely'
- 'Why throbs this heart'
- 'Ah! Happy hour' (duet)
- 'The desert waste, the rocky steep'
- 'I make thee king'
- 'My loved home I never shall see more'
- 'No joy can e'er the bliss exceed'

== Recordings ==
There is no recording of the complete opera. Only one aria with piano accompaniment has so far been recorded:

- Through the Pathless Forest Drear, performed by Sally Silver (soprano) and Richard Bonynge (piano), on the album Songs by William Vincent Wallace, Somm Célèste SOMMCD 0131, CD (2013).

== Sources ==
- Brown, T. Allston, A history of the New York stage from the first performance in 1732 to 1901, Dodd, Mead and Co., 1903, Vol. 2, p. 59.
- Flood, W. H. Grattan, William Vincent Wallace: A Memoir, Published at the offices of The Waterford News, 1912.
- The Rose, the Shamrock and the Thistle, a Magazine, "October 12 — Royal English Opera, Covent Garden", Vol. 4, November 1863 April 1864, pp. 223–224.
- Wallace, William Vincent, The Desert Flower: An Opera, in Three Acts, libretto published by the Theatre Royal, Covent Garden and sold in the theatre, 1863.
- Wyndham, Henry Saxe, The annals of Covent Garden theatre from 1732 to 1897, Chatto & Windus, 1906, Vol. 2, p. 243.
