= The Rose of Castille =

- Opera by Michael William Balfe
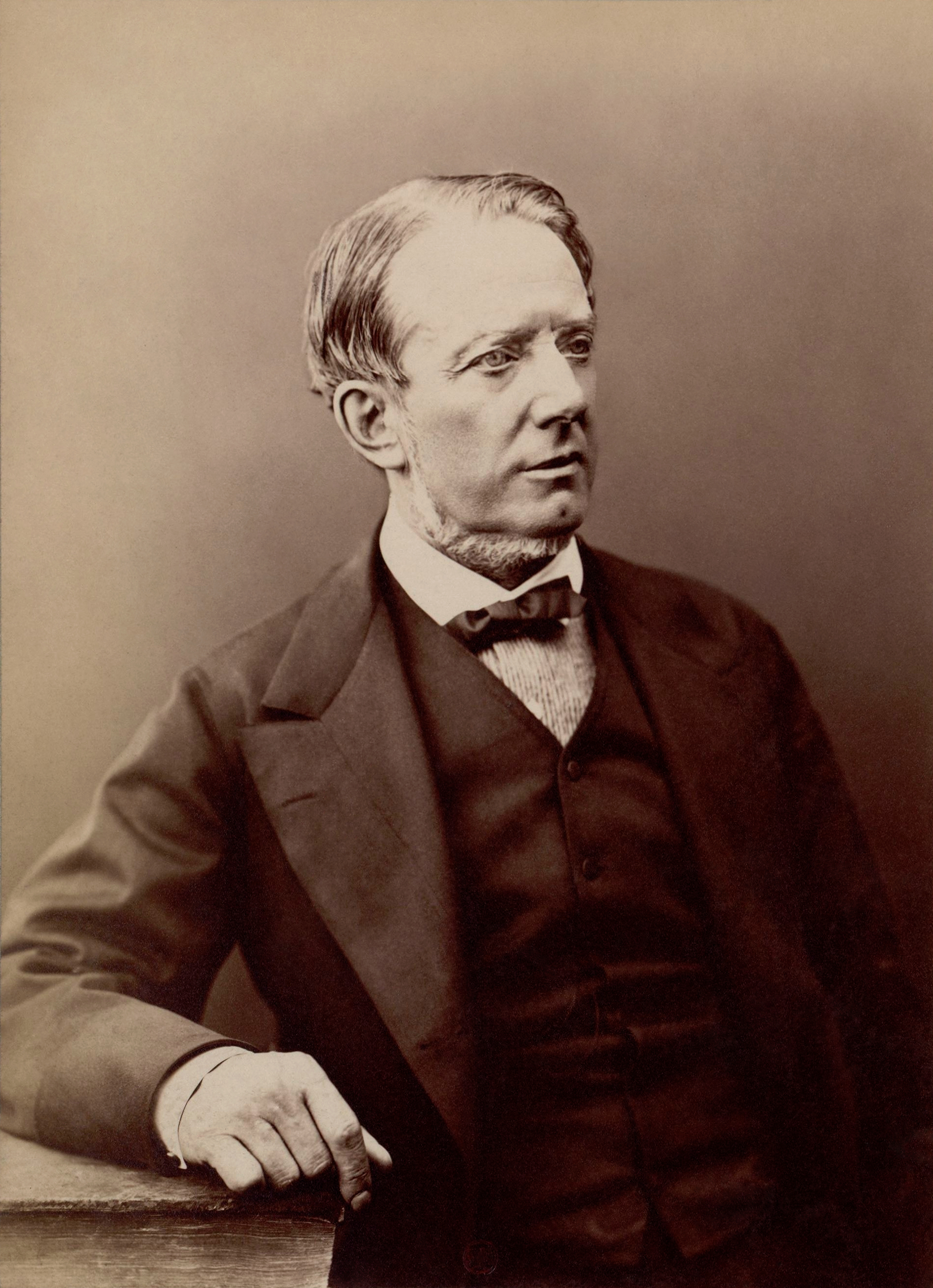
- The composer
- Librettist: Augustus Glossop Harris; Edmund Falconer
- Language: English
- Premiere: 29 October 1857; Lyceum Theatre, London

The Rose of Castille (or Castile) is an opera in three acts, with music by Michael William Balfe to an English-language libretto by Augustus Glossop Harris and Edmund Falconer, after the libretto by Adolphe d'Ennery and Clairville (alias of Louis-François Nicolaïe (1811–1879)) for Adolphe Adam's Le muletier de Tolède (1854). It was premiered on 29 October 1857, at the Lyceum Theatre, London.

== Background ==
After the closure in 1852 of Her Majesty's Theatre, Balfe, who had conducted the Italian Opera there since the departure of Michael Costa in 1846, embarked on extensive tours of European theatres, visiting Berlin, Vienna, Saint Petersburg and Trieste. In 1857, he returned to London and composed six new English operas for the Pyne-Harrison Opera Company, founded by the soprano Louisa Pyne and the tenor William Harrison, which after touring Britain for four years had sailed for New York in 1854. The Rose of Castille was the first and most successful of these operas, and the only one to premiere at the Lyceum before the company moved (via Drury Lane) to the rebuilt Royal Opera House, Covent Garden, where the remaining five premiered between 1858 and 1863.

The Rose of Castille was composed in less than six weeks (between 19 September and 11 October 1857).

== Performance history ==
Balfe's reputation as a composer had declined after the success of The Bohemian Girl in 1843, but The Times in 1857 was in no doubt that The Rose of Castille marked a return to form: "The ancient glories of The Bohemian Girl were revived at this theatre tonight when a new opera by Mr Balfe ... was produced with as great a success as was ever achieved by the composer of the first-named work ... there were numerous encores and tumultuous applause ... the opera terminated at an unusually late hour..."

During the Pyne-Harrison company's brief sojourn at Drury Lane, a gala performance of the opera was given at Her Majesty's Theatre on 21 January 1858, in honour of the impending marriage of Queen Victoria's daughter Princess Victoria to Prince Frederick William of Prussia.

In the US, the opera was given at the Olympic Theatre, New York City, in 1864 (at least five performances) and 1867 (two performances) with tenor William Castle.

After the demise of the Pyne-Harrison company, many of its assets were taken over by the Carl Rosa Opera Company, who continued to perform Balfe's operas until around 1900, as later did the Moody-Manners Opera Company, which ceased to exist in 1916. The Rose of Castille was chosen for the inaugural performances in 1951 of the first Wexford Festival to celebrate an Irish composer who had lived for a time in Wexford, but few, if any, revivals of the opera have taken place since then.

The Rose of Castile was performed again at Wexford in May 1991 to celebrate the 40th anniversary year of the founding of the Wexford Festival.

== Roles ==
Role	Voice type	Premiere cast, 29 October 1857 (Conductor: Michael Balfe)
Queen Elvira of León	soprano	Louisa Pyne
Donna Carmen, her lady-in-waiting	contralto	Susan Pyne
Manuel, a muleteer	tenor	William Harrison
Don Pedro, the Queen's cousin	bass	Willoughby Weiss
Don Florio, an accomplice of Don Pedro	baritone	George Honey
Don Sallust, another accomplice of Don Pedro	tenor	A. St. Albyn
Louisa, an innkeeper		
The Duchess of Calatrava		
Don Alvaro, lieutenant to King Carlos of Spain		
Pablo, a peasant		
Peasants, nobles, conspirators, pages, etc.

== Synopsis ==
Place: Spain
Time: The Middle Ages

The King of Castille apparently wants Elvira, Queen of León, to marry his brother, Don Sebastian, and, because it has been rumoured that Sebastian will enter her kingdom in disguise, she has in turn disguised herself as a peasant girl (and her attendant, Carmen, is disguised as a peasant boy) in order to see what he is like.

=== Act 1 ===
A rural scene in front of an inn

Peasants, dancing and singing, invite Elvira and Carmen to join their dance. They decline, but Elvira sings a scherzo ("Yes, I'll obey you"). The innkeeper insults them, but the muleteer Manuel (an aristocrat in disguise) arrives to protect them ("I am a simple muleteer"). Elvira guesses that he is Don Sebastian and agrees to be escorted by him. They leave.

Don Pedro, who plans, together with his accomplices, to usurp Elvira's throne, now appears. Their trio turns into a bacchanal ("Wine, wine, the magician thou art"). Elvira, still in disguise, reappears, and the conspirators, noticing that she closely resembles the Queen, persuade her to impersonate her real self. Knowing that "Manuel" will follow her, she agrees to leave with them, and her rondo ("Oh, were I the Queen of Spain") leads into a concerted finale.

=== Act 2 ===
The throne-room in Elvira's palace

Don Pedro's followers sing the chorus "The Queen in the palace". Pedro plans to capture the Queen and send her to a convent (substituting the peasant girl) if she will not marry him. He is, however, uncertain whether his plot will work ("Though fortune darkly o'er me frowns"). They all leave, and Elvira and her attendants arrive. She sings the ballad "Of girlhood's happy days I dream" (also known as "The Convent Cell"). Manuel is now granted an audience with the Queen. He tells her of his meeting with the peasant girl and boy, and of his belief that they were the Queen and Carmen. The ladies ridicule him (Trio: "I'm not the Queen, ha ha!"). He tells Elvira of Don Pedro's plan, and she arranges for the Duchess of Calatrava, heavily veiled, to impersonate her. The Duchess is duly carried off to a convent, but Pedro and Florio still have not located the peasant girl. Suddenly, she (Elvira in disguise again) appears, singing "I'm but a simple peasant maid". She vanishes, and the Queen, once again appearing as herself, declares, to general consternation, that she intends to marry the muleteer.

=== Act 3 ===
Carmen sings "Though love's the greatest plague in life", followed by a duet with Don Florio. The couple agree to marry. The Queen and her attendants appear, and she sings "Oh joyous, happy day". Don Alvaro arrives to inform her that Don Sebastian is to be married. Elvira, realising that the muleteer Manuel is not Don Sebastian, is enraged, but his ballad "'Twas rank and fame that tempted thee" melts her heart, and she swears to be true to him. Don Pedro is delighted: if the Queen marries a commoner, he can force her to abdicate ("Hark, hark, methinks I hear").

In the Queen's throne-room, Manuel announces that he is King of Castille and will marry Elvira. Don Pedro has to beg for mercy, and Elvira's bravura aria ("Oh no! By fortune blessed"), concludes the opera to general rejoicing: she will now be the Rose of Castille as well as the Queen of León.

== Allusions to the opera ==
James Joyce's Ulysses contains a number of references to The Rose of Castille (many more than to The Bohemian Girl or The Maid of Artois). The most notable is in the Aeolus section, where Lenehan answers his own riddle, "What opera is like a railway line?", with "The Rose of Castille. See the wheeze? Rows of cast steel." In addition, Manuel's aria, "'Twas rank and fame that tempted thee" is quoted in the same section and again in the Sirens section.

== Recording ==
- The Rose of Castile: Maureen Springer (Elvira), Murray Dickie (Manuel), Angela O'Connor (Carmen), James Cuthbert (Don Pedro), Wexford Festival Chorus, Radio Éireann Light Orchestra, conductor Dermot O’Hara, Rare Recorded Editions RRE 191/2, 1951. Issued on 2 LPs in the 1970s, later (c2002) issued on CD by the Balfe Archive, London.
- A concert performance of The Rose of Castile was recorded by The Comic Opera Guild in 2010.
