= The Lily of Killarney =

Opera in three acts by Julius Benedict

Composer Julius Benedict

The Lily of Killarney is an opera in three acts by Julius Benedict. The libretto, by John Oxenford and Dion Boucicault, is based on Boucicault's own play The Colleen Bawn. The opera received its premiere at Covent Garden Theatre, London on Monday 10 February 1862.

== Background ==
Benedict himself approached Boucicault to adapt The Colleen Bawn into an opera libretto in the spring of 1861. Although the two men worked well at first, relations became strained as Benedict asked Boucicault for revisions and reductions of his lengthy spoken dialogue to allow more space for Oxenford's lyrics, while Boucicault increasingly resented his original drama being reshaped into a workable operatic format. After Oxenford and Benedict's deaths in 1877 and 1885 respectively, Boucicault denounced opera in its entirety as being an impossible dramatic genre in the April 1887 issue of The North American Review, where he also recounted his experiences in creating the libretto for The Lily of Killarney as well as his general opinion of the work: "[...] Benedict clung to his affection for the Irish play, and we took John Oxenford into our counsels [sic]. Our names are coupled on the title page of the libretto, but all my share in the business was watching my lamb cut up into a marketable shape [...] All the sentiment, all the tenderness, all the simple poetry was swept away. [...] The glamour, the intoxication produced by the music not only covers and conceals the wretched thing on which it rests, but transmutes the poorest acting into admirable effort. The most wooden of tenors becomes a miracle of tragic passion when he pronounces an upper D from the chest." Boucicault completely dismissed the opera's success, despite Benedict's considerable efforts in creating a believably "Irish" work worthy of its original source, and never took part in writing another opera libretto.

The Lily of Killarney became the most widely performed of Benedict's operas. It has been linked with Balfe's The Bohemian Girl and Wallace's Maritana as 'The Irish Ring', though it is musically and dramatically far more sophisticated than either Balfe's or Wallace's operas. Its convincing handling of Irish idiom is interesting considering Benedict's German-Jewish origins, but Benedict's training under Weber instilled a strong respect and instinct for appropriate musical atmosphere, and he also included some genuine Irish melodies, notably the 18th-century air "The Cruiskeen Lawn" which he set as a quartet (No. 6 in the opera's vocal score) in Act I. Some of the opera's songs – notably The moon hath raised her lamp above and Eily Mavourneen – remain in the repertoire. The opera is mentioned in James Joyce's Ulysses and Djuna Barnes' Nightwood.

== Roles ==
Role	Voice type	Premiere Cast, 10 February 1862 (Conductor: – Alfred Mellon)
Eily O'Connor (the 'colleen bawn')	soprano	Louisa Pyne
Ann Shute	soprano	Jessie McLean
Mr. Corrigan	bass	Eugene Dussek
Father Tom	baritone	John George Patey
Hardress Cregan	tenor	Henry Haigh
Mrs. Cregan	contralto	Susan Pyne
Danny Mann	baritone	Charles Santley
Myles na Coppaleen	tenor	William Harrison

== Synopsis ==
Time: Late 18th century.
Place: In and around Killarney.

=== Act One ===
At Tore Cregan, the ancestral home of Hardress Cregan, guests praise the 'bachelor' heir, paying little heed to the fact that Cregan is secretly married to Eily (the 'Colleen Bawn' = Gaelic 'the fair maid'), the eponymous Lily of Killarney. They go off to an impromptu moonlight race between the horses of two of the guests. Mrs Cregan is now left alone, and to her enters Corrigan, a 'middle man' who holds a mortgage on the Tore Cregan estates. Corrigan threatens to dispossess Cregan and his mother, who have mortgaged their lands to him, unless Cregan marries the heiress Ann Shute. Danny the boatman is now heard singing 'off'. Corrigan informs Mrs Cregan that he is waiting to row her son over the water to visit Eily.

In Eily's cottage, Father Tom urges her to persuade Hardress to proclaim their marriage to the world, but Hardress arrives and asks Eily to give up the certificate of their marriage altogether. Myles and the priest intervene, and Hardress departs enraged.

=== Act Two ===
Back at Tore Cregan, Hardress is reluctantly wooing Ann Shute, while Corrigan turns his attention towards Mrs Cregan. Danny determines to resolve the situation by killing Eily. Cregan demurs, but the unwitting Mrs. Cregan is persuaded by Danny to give him one on her son's gloves as a token for Eily's death. Primed with strong drink, Danny goes to put his scheme into execution at Eily's hut. Myles tries to dissuade Eily from going with him, but the sight of Hardress's glove convinces her that all is well. Danny rows her to a lonely cave.

Outside the cave, Danny, thinking that he has Eily at his mercy, tells her that she must either surrender her marriage certificate to him or take it with her to the bottom of the lake. Myles, who uses the cave as a refuge, mistakes Danny for otter and shoots him. He then proceeds to rescue Eily and bear her away with him.

=== Act Three ===
Hardress, believing Eily to be dead, is about to be married to Miss Shute. Danny, however, makes a confession on the point of death of the plot against Eily and suspicion falls on Hardress as the instigator of the scheme. On the wedding morning Corrigan arranges that soldiers will come and arrest the bridegroom. Then Myles produces Eily, alive, and Hardress acknowledges her as his lawful wife. Mrs Cregan relates how it was she who gave the glove to Danny. The opera ends with the joy of Hardress and Eily, and the discomfiture of Corrigan. Myles consoles Miss Shute with the reminder that he, too, is doomed to love in vain.

== Sources ==
- Nigel Burton, The Lily of Killarney in Grove Music Online
- The Viking Opera Guide ed. Holden (Viking, 1993)
- J. Walker McSpadden, Opera Synopses (George G. Harrap & Company, 1922)
