= Frederick Federici =

British opera singer (1850–1888)

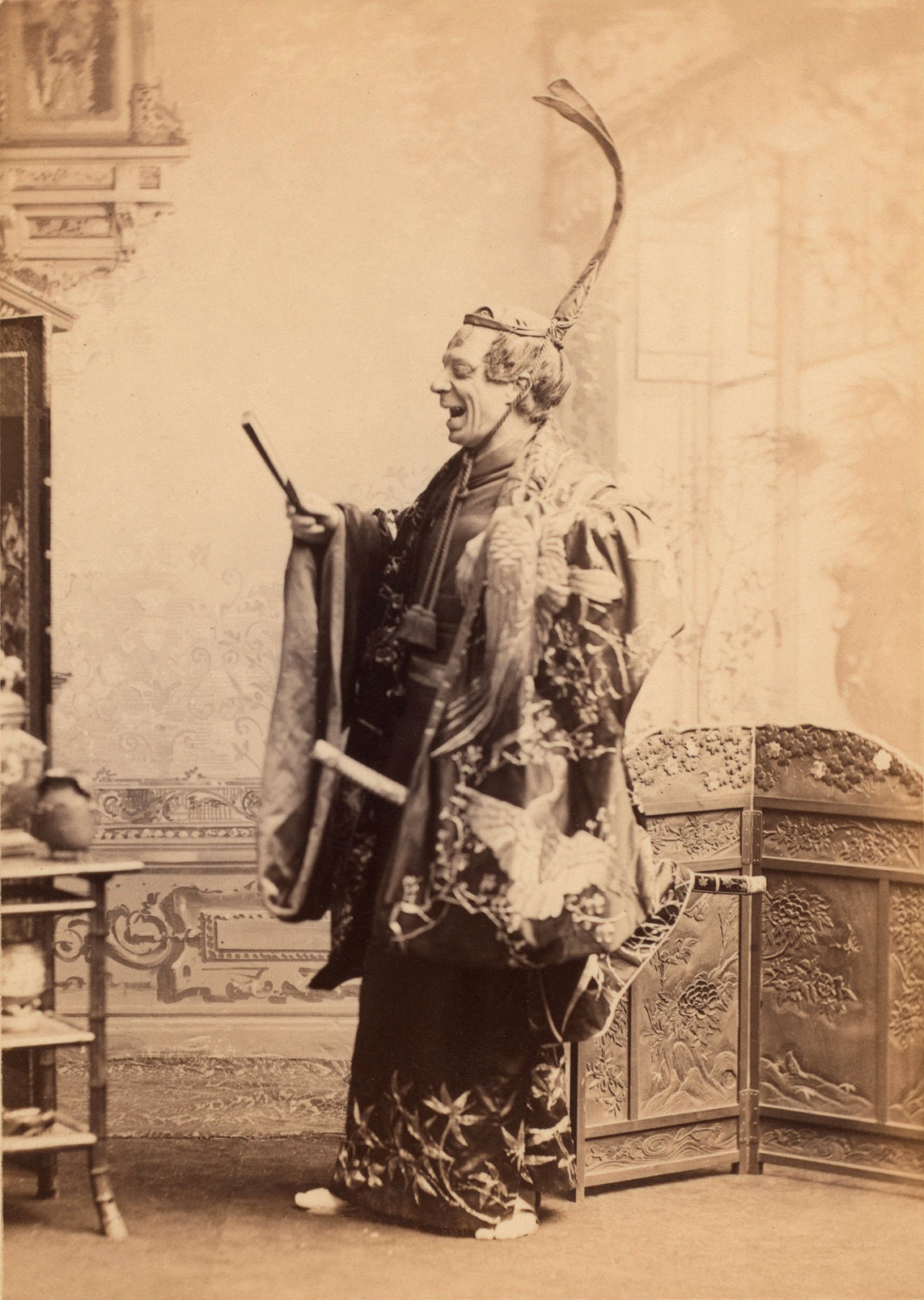
Federici in the title role of the first American production of The Mikado (1885).

Frederick Federici (22 April 1850 – 3 March 1888) was an Italian-born British opera singer known for his work in the bass-baritone roles of the Savoy Operas written by Gilbert and Sullivan. He is also remembered as a reputed theatre ghost in Australia.

Early in his career, Federici worked as a talent agent before becoming a concert singer. From 1879 to 1887 he toured extensively in Gilbert and Sullivan's comic operas with the D'Oyly Carte Opera Company. His roles included the Pirate King from The Pirates of Penzance appearing in the opera's first performance in 1879. He also played, among other roles, Captain Corcoran in H.M.S. Pinafore, Colonel Calverley in Patience, Strephon in Iolanthe and Florian in Princess Ida. He appeared in the title role in The Mikado (1885) and as Sir Roderic in Ruddigore (1887) in the first authorised American productions of those works.

In 1887, Federici moved to Australia where he played in Gilbert and Sullivan and other operas with the J. C. Williamson company. His last role was Mephistopheles in Gounod's opera Faust at the Princess Theatre in Melbourne in March 1888. On opening night, after he sang the last note of the opera, and as he descended through a trap door in the stage, he had a heart attack and died suddenly. Ever since then, a legend holds that his ghost haunts that theatre.

== Early life ==
Born as Anatole Frederick Demidoff Baker in Florence, Grand Duchy of Tuscany, the younger son of Eric Thomas Baker (1810–1882) from a military family, and his wife Georgina Barbara née Crossman, the daughter of a clergyman. Federici eventually returned to Britain. There, he trained for the diplomatic service but decided instead to pursue a singing career and also worked for a time as a theatrical agent and wrote songs.

Federici began singing in London concerts by age 21, in 1872, at the Schubert Society, Freemasons' Tavern, St George's Hall and Surrey Gardens, among others. Later in 1872, he sang in Glasgow in a concert party organized by Sims Reeves. He soon appeared in Monday Pops concerts, in The Messiah at the Leeds Triennial Festival and in Edinburgh and Glasgow, and in various other oratorios. He was also engaged at London's Theatre Royal, Drury Lane. In Ireland, he first appeared in operatic roles as the King in Maritana, Rodolfo in La Sonnambula, Valentine in Faust, Arnheim in The Bohemian Girl, the Baron in Lurline, and continued singing in concerts, earning warm reviews. 1873, he made his London debut at the Crystal Palace theatre in Faust, Maritana, The Bohemian Girl and, as Father Tom in The Lily of Killarney and continued singing in concerts and touring with Carlotta Patti and others, despite some ill health in the mid-1870s.

Federici wrote the song "Dearer than all to me" in 1874. In 1877, he was engaged at the Royal Aquarium where he appeared in, among other things, performances of Gilbert and Sullivan's Trial by Jury. In 1878 he declared bankruptcy. He continued singing at the Aquarium, and he played the Sultan in a revival of Alfred Cellier's The Sultan of Mocha in Manchester. He also taught singing and performed at the Covent Garden proms and other London concerts. But around 1878, he joined the army, avoiding his creditors.

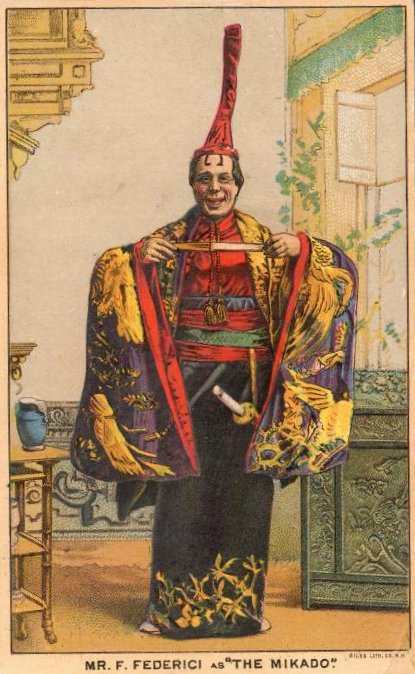
Federici as the Mikado on a Straiton & Storm Cigar trade card (1885)

After leaving the army, he joined the D'Oyly Carte Opera Company in July 1879 and was given the role of Captain Corcoran on a tour of H.M.S. Pinafore. In March 1880 he switched to the role of Bill Bobstay in the same production. While on that tour, he married fellow D'Oyly Carte artist Lena Monmouth (real name Jane Elenor Finili (1858–1937). The couple eventually had two children, Louis Wallace Horace (born 1881) and Marguerite Ellissa Anita Baker (1882–1936).

To secure the British copyright for the new Gilbert and Sullivan opera The Pirates of Penzance, which was to open in New York the following night the Pinafore touring company gave a perfunctory performance of Pirates the afternoon before the New York premiere, at the Royal Bijou Theatre in Paignton, Devon, organised by Helen Lenoir, the secretary and future wife of Richard D'Oyly Carte. The cast, including Federici, which was performing Pinafore in the evenings in Torquay, received some of the music for Pirates only two days beforehand. Having had only one rehearsal, they travelled to nearby Paignton for the matinee, where they read their parts from scripts carried onto the stage, making do with whatever costumes they had on hand. Federici thus originated the role of the Pirate King. In August 1880 he appeared briefly as Mr. Liverby in In the Sulks, the curtain-raiser that was played before H.M.S. Pinafore.

== Peak career ==
In further D'Oyly Carte tours of the Gilbert and Sullivan operas, from late 1880, Federici appeared as Captain Corcoran in H.M.S. Pinafore and then Samuel in The Pirates of Penzance. He next appeared as the Pirate King in Pirates in 1881. The Era wrote that Federici "is capital as the Pirate King". He Played Colonel Calverley from 1882 to 1883 in Patience. One local reviewer wrote that Federici "has a somewhat powerful voice, which comes out well in the patter song ... "If you want a receipt for that popular mystery," whilst his solo "When first I put this uniform on," was received with great éclat, and another said that he "evoked enthusiastic applause".

The Princess Theatre, Melbourne c.1920

Through most of 1883 Federici toured as Strephon in Iolanthe. The Leeds Mercury wrote that "Federici, vocally and otherwise was excellent as Strephon". So did the Manchester Times. The Bristol Mercury and Daily Post thought that "Strephon was effectively rendered by Mr. F. Federici, who not only acquitted himself very satisfactorily in the singing, but infused into the part a vein of quiet humour". However, The Era had a mixed reaction: "Mr. F. Federici, though a good actor, is a trifle too robust in style", and the Liverpool Mercury wrote that "he is too conscious of the importance of the place he holds in the piece". In 1884 he played Florian in Princess Ida. The Era called him "most artistic" in the role. In the first half of 1885, he toured as the Counsel to the Plaintiff in Trial by Jury and Sir Marmaduke Pointdextre in The Sorcerer, while also continuing to appear as Florian in Princess Ida.

In July 1885, he toured Britain in the title role in The Mikado before being sent to New York to play the same role in the first authorised American production of that opera at the Fifth Avenue Theatre. Following an American tour of The Mikado, Federici returned to Britain briefly in May 1886 to tour as Dick Deadeye in H.M.S. Pinafore and as the title character in The Mikado before taking the latter work on a D'Oyly Carte tour of Austria and Germany until January 1887. In February 1887 he made his only appearance at the Savoy Theatre in London as the ghost Sir Roderic Murgatroyd in two matinee performances of Ruddigore before being sent back to New York to play the same role until April 1887 in the first American production of Ruddigore, again at the Fifth Avenue Theatre. Following this production, he left the D'Oyly Carte Opera Company.

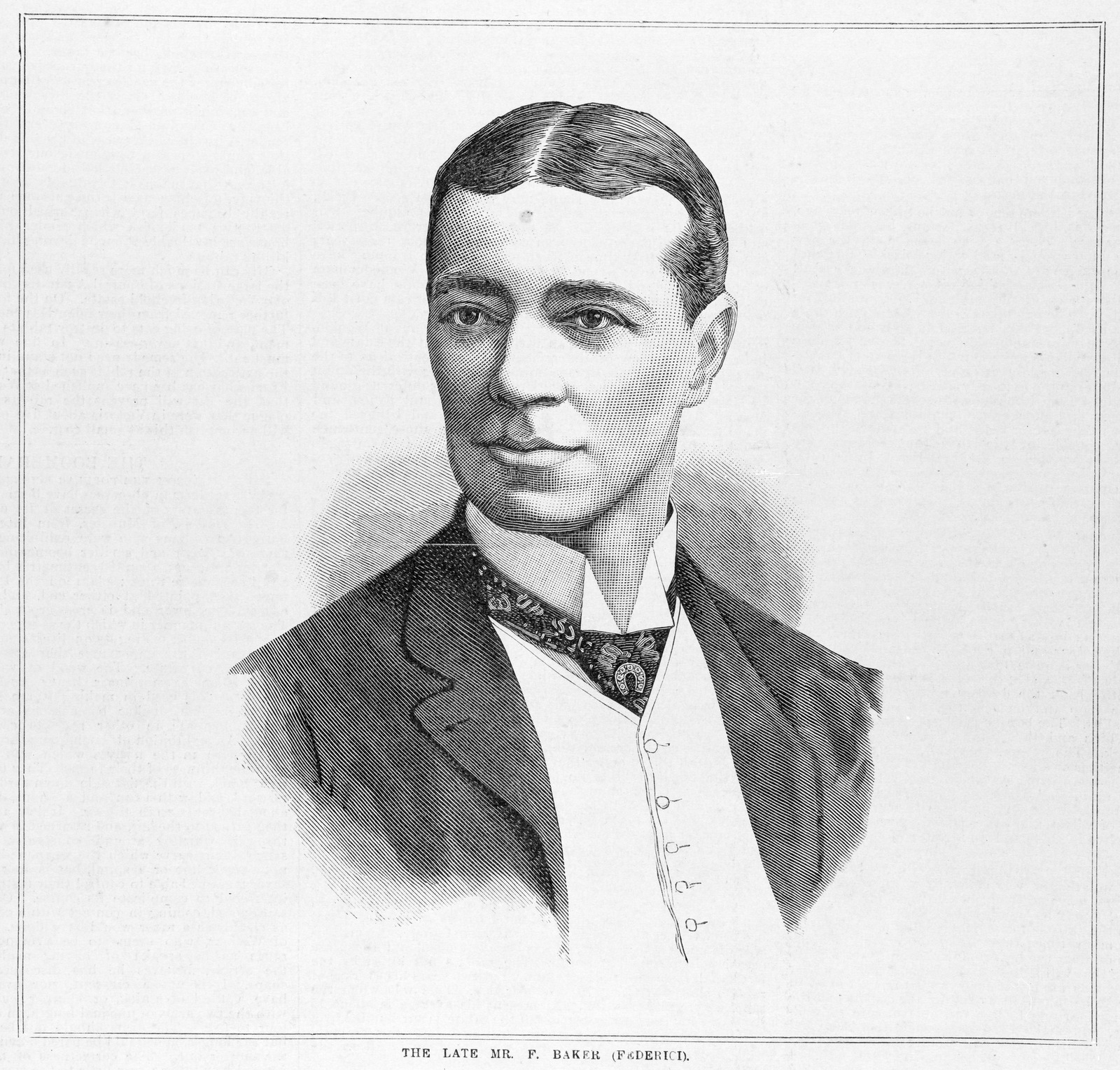
Frederick Federici, from a report on his death in 1888

Federici, with his wife and children, then travelled to Australia to join J. C. Williamson's company with which, in July 1887, he played Florian at the Princess Theatre in Melbourne in the first production in that country of Princess Ida. In August 1887 he appeared at the same theatre as Harry Sherwood in Alfred Cellier's operetta Dorothy, and in December 1887 he appeared there with Leonora Braham, in Edward Jakobowski's hit musical comedy Erminie, in the role of the Marquis de Pontvert. Other roles in Australia included the Mikado, the Pirate King, Dick Deadeye, Colonel Calverley and Strephon. His wife played small roles such as Lady Betty in Dorothy and Celia in Iolanthe.

== Death and ghost legend ==
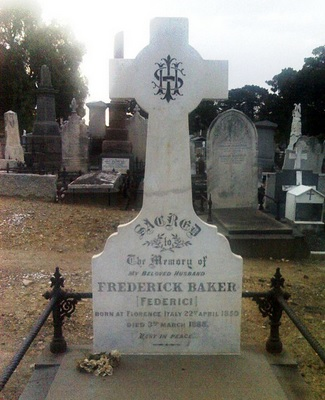
Federici's grave in Melbourne General Cemetery

On 3 March 1888 Federici was performing the role of Mephistopheles (rather than Valentine) in Faust on opening night at the Princess Theatre in Melbourne, Australia. Nellie Stewart was playing Marguerite, and Alfred Cellier was conducting. The opera ended with Mephistopheles sinking dramatically through a trapdoor, as he returned to the fires of hell, bearing Faust with him. However, as Federici was being lowered down into the basement, he had a heart attack and died within minutes. He was 37 years old. The Press of Melbourne wrote about Federici's career, performance and the events of the evening:

The tragic and appalling occurrence ... must command universal sympathy and regret. Mr Federici achieved considerable success both in England and America in comic opera, but he was also an excellent musician and the composer of several songs of more than average merit, and before his association with comic opera had successfully appeared as a vocalist at some of the best concerts in London, including the Monday Popular Concerts at St. James's Hall. It seems an act almost of irreverence to criticise the performance of an actor who has only just been carried to his grave.

Nevertheless, it is only his due and his proper tribute to say that he both sang and acted on Saturday night in a truly artistic manner and that he has never been seen to greater advantage than he was on that occasion. ... The theatre was closed on Monday evening out of respect to the memory of the deceased artist.

The Argus newspaper in Melbourne, among many other press reports, carried a detailed account of the incident. It noted that soon after he collapsed, Federici was carried to the theatre's green room, where his doctor was unable to revive him and pronounced him dead. Cast members, who were unaware of Federici's death until later in the evening, said that he had joined in the final bows after the performance. Since then, members of the theatre's staff and others have claimed to see a ghostly figure in evening dress at the theatre. For many years, a third-row seat in the dress circle was kept vacant in his honour on every opening night.

Federici was buried in Melbourne General Cemetery on 5 March 1888. The Federici Bistro in Melbourne is named after him. His wife and children returned to England in June 1888 and moved in with her father, Luigi Finili, a plaster-figures-maker from Lucca. In 1894, she remarried.

== See also ==
- List of ghosts
