= William Castle (disambiguation) =

William Castle (1914–1977) was an American film director, producer, and actor.

William Castle may also refer to:

- William Castle (shipbuilder) (c. 1615–1681) English shipbuilder for the Royal Navy
- William Castle (tenor) (1836–1909), English tenor active in the United States
- William B. Castle (1814–1872), American politician from Ohio
- William Bosworth Castle (1897–1990), American physician and physiologist
- William E. Castle (1867–1962), American geneticist
- William Richards Castle (1849–1935), lawyer, politician and Attorney General of Hawaii
- William Richards Castle Jr. (1878–1963), U.S. educator, diplomat and ambassador to Japan

== See also ==
- "William Castle", song by Jay Chou in the 2001 album Fantasy
