= William Castle (tenor) =

English tenor

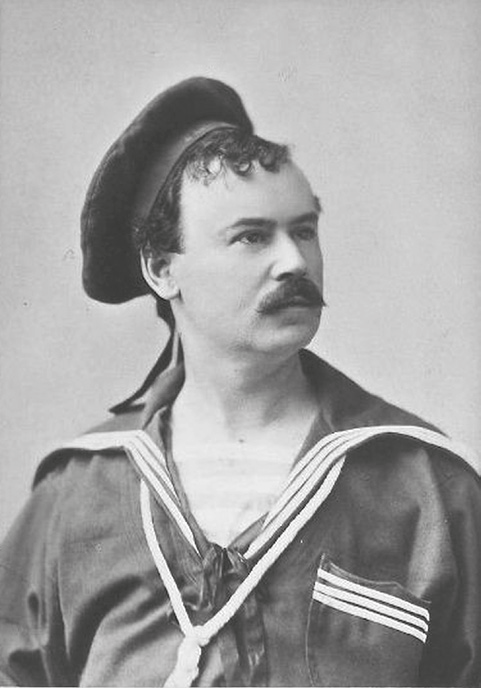
- William Castle as Ralph Rackstraw in HMS Pinafore
- Born: 22 December 1836; Wallingford
- Died: 31 March 1909 (aged 72); Chicago
- Occupation: Singer

William Castle (22 December 1836 — 31 March 1909) was an English tenor who was active mainly in the United States during the mid to late 19th century. He appeared in several English language operettas and operas on Broadway during the 1860s, and later returned to Broadway in 1886 to star as Sándor Barinkay in the United States premiere of Johann Strauss II's The Gypsy Baron. Historian Kurt Gänzl described Castle as the "most popular operatic tenor of the Victorian era on the English-language stages of America".

== Life and career ==
William James Castle was born in St Mary-le-More, Wallingford, Oxfordshire. He studied singing with Pedro Abella who was married to contralto Elena D'Angri, and began his performance career in 1859. He performed in Christy's Minstrels in England before becoming a leading tenor on American stages in New York, Boston, and Washington D.C. He made his Broadway debut as Don Cæsar de Bazan in William Vincent Wallace's Maritana at the Olympic Theatre, New York in 1864. Also at that theater in 1864, he portrayed Manuel in the United States premiere of Michael William Balfe's The Rose of Castille. He appeared in several more Broadway productions during his career, including portrayals of the Lorenzo in Fra Diavolo (1864 and 1867), Thaddeus in The Bohemian Girl (1864 and 1867), and Captain Maurice in The Desert Flower (1868). After a long absence, he returned to Broadway in 1886 to star as Sándor Barinkay in the United States premiere of Johann Strauss II's The Gypsy Baron at the Casino Theatre.

While he primarily achieved acclaim in his performances in English, Castle also performed in Italian language operas at the Academy of Music (New York City) and on tour in the United States with Jacob Grau's opera company in the 1860s. He toured the United States performing in English with numerous opera companies in 1860s through the 1880s, including Euphrosyne Parepa-Rosa's Carl Rosa Opera Company and companies operated by Emma Abbott, C. D. Hess, Gustav Hinrichs, Clara Louise Kellogg, and Caroline Richings.

After retiring from opera, Castle continued to perform on the stage as an actor in plays by William Shakespeare into his later years; often portraying characters requiring musical performance. He achieved. particular success as Amiens in As You Like It.

Castle died in Chicago at 442 West Adams on 31 March 1909.
