= George Honey =

Honey, from an 1880 magazine

George Honey (25 May 1822 – 28 May 1880) was a British actor, comedian and singer. He was in the original productions of Caste by T. W. Robertson, and Engaged by W. S. Gilbert.

== Opera ==
Honey's acting career began in November 1848 at the Princess's Theatre, London, in the role of Pan in Midas. He was not regarded as a comedian in his early career, but as a singer; he joined the Pyne & Harrison Opera Company and appeared in several operas. One of these was The Rose of Castille, in which he appeared in the original production in 1857 at the Lyceum Theatre, London. Another was Martha in 1858 at the Drury Lane theatre, in an English translation; a reviewer in The Musical World wrote, "Mr. George Honey made an amusing caricature of Lord Tristan, but was not always to be praised for his extravagances."

== Comic roles ==
From the early 1860s Honey concentrated on the dramatic stage, mainly in comic roles playing dissipated characters, for which he became popular. In 1865 he appeared in William Brough's burlesque Prince Amabel; in 1866 he was in Watts Phillips's The Huguenot Captain. In 1867 he appeared at the Prince of Wales Theatre in the original production of Caste by T. W. Robertson, which opened on 6 April; he played the part of Eccles. In the Daily News on 8 April, a critic wrote about this production:

Instead of the conventional clowns who are put in by slop-work dramatists to lighten the serious interest of their work, we have real characters who think, speak, and act like human beings, and yet are intensely amusing and interesting. The drunken father, evidently made up from Mr. George Cruikshank's pictures of The Bottle, is admirably played by Mr. George Honey, who made his first appearance at this theatre, and who never acted better.... The make-up, the voice, the manner, the savagery in one part, the hypocritical maudlin grief in another, the toadying to wealth in another, the disgust and abuse when wealth refuses to deposit even a sovereign, the exits and entrances of this character, are things to be gratefully remembered....

Honey was in the original production, which opened on 16 April 1870 at the Vaudeville Theatre, of For Love or Money by Andrew Haliday. He appeared in the play Money by Edward Bulwer-Lytton, playing the part of Graves. He first took this role in 1869; the play was revived at the Prince of Wales Theatre in 1872 and 1875, where it made a greater impression on audiences. In the Standard on 31 May 1875, a critic wrote:

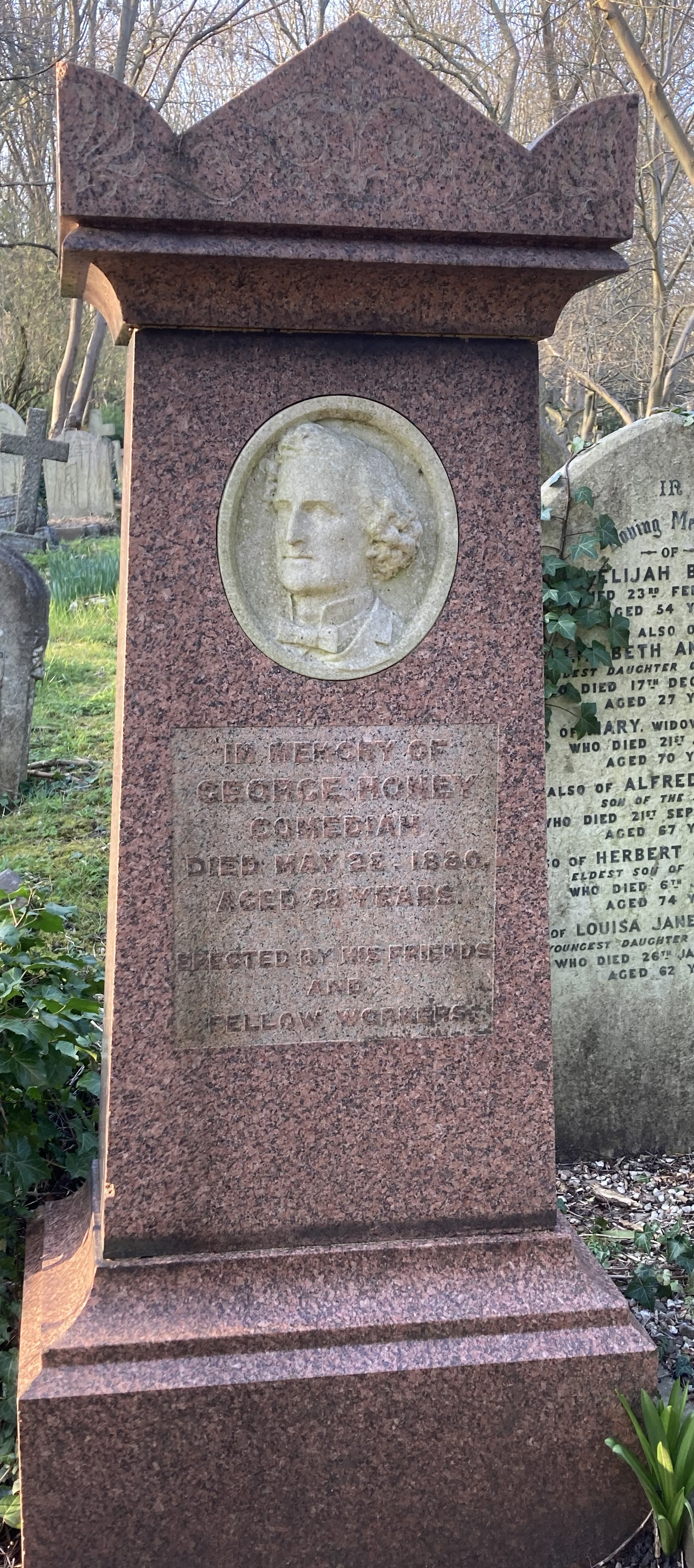
Grave of George Honey in Highgate Cemetery (east side)

A noticeable and welcome feature in the revival is the return of Mr. George Honey, who resumes his part of Graves, one of the most genuine and unexaggerated examples of pure humour the modern stage has witnessed. Before Mr. Honey has uttered three sentences the character of Graves is distinctly placed before the spectator. The manner in which the sigh of grief for the memory of "sainted Maria" gives place to the approving criticism on the glass of sherry, and the aspect of bereavement changes to a look of gratification as his eye lights on the pleasant face of Lady Franklin, is irresistibly amusing; and the subsequent scene between the two is the perfection of comedy acting....

He was successful in the original cast of W.S.Gilbert's comedy Engaged, which opened on 3 October 1877 at the Haymarket Theatre; he played the part of Cheviot Hill. He returned to the role of Eccles in Caste, from January to May 1879 at the Prince of Wales Theatre.

Honey retired due to ill-health in 1879; he died in London in 1880, and was buried in Highgate Cemetery.
