= Roy Shuttleworth =

English psychologist

Roy Shuttleworth is an English psychologist known for his work in the fields of Family Therapy and Psychodrama. He was a Senior Psychologist at Long Grove Hospital, Epsom, and the Founding Chair of the British Association for Drama Therapy and Principal Therapist at the Family Institute in Cardiff. Following a period working in Hong Kong, Roy entered private practice in London and the West Country, working mainly in the Harley Street area.

== Early life ==
Roy Edward Shuttleworth was born in Cairo to English parents. His father was an RAF pilot. He is the eldest of 4 children, and when he was 7 years old the family moved to Australia.

== Career ==
He received a Bachelor of Science Degree from Melbourne University, and then a teaching qualification (Dip.Ed) from the same establishment, and taught Science in secondary schools in Melbourne, later moving to London and working as a supply teacher for several months, prior to entering the Psychological profession.

He gained his qualifications in Clinical Psychology in London, specialising in Adult and Adolescent Psychology. He became the Senior Psychologist at the Regional Adolescent Unit at Long Grove Hospital, Epsom, where he helped to develop some innovative treatment techniques, in particular Psychodrama. and Family Therapy.

His Family Therapy training was with Dr Robin Skynner, a pioneer in the UK for this treatment approach. His Drama Therapy. and its associated Play Therapy techniques were developed under the guidance of Sue Jennings

Roy later went on to write a number of papers about these techniques in their application to adults, children and adolescents, as well as being involved in extensive training courses. Recounting one such conference appearance, the Times Educational Supplement noted of Roy's contribution "Then - suddenly the meeting came alive" as he defined and demonstrated psychodrama techniques with the audience. He later became the Founding Chair of the British Association for Drama Therapy, and was involved as an external examiner for two Drama Therapy courses.

He next moved to Cardiff in 1979 where he became the Principal Therapist at the Family Institute. This was a pioneering organisation, funded by Barnardo's, which as well as providing treatment for families, was also a major training organisation, and involved in research.

Roy was particularly interested in helping families stay together, and when not possible, providing the circumstance under which the least damage would be done to the family members. Together with his colleagues including Brian Cade, Peter Hudson, Bebe Speed, Phillipa Seligman and Harvey Jones, he developed techniques for helping families become 'unstuck', when they continued to repeat the same negative stereotypic behaviour, which was very destructive to the family process.

Techniques were developed within the framework of the 'Brief Therapy, Strategic Movement', as well as Family Systems Therapy to help release the family from these negative patterns.

After a period in Hong Kong, dealing with expatriate stress and general psychological disorders, Roy returned in 1988 to private practice in London and the West Country, the former being mainly in the Harley Street area, working with some outstanding psychiatrists and psychologists, such as Denis Friedman, Lewis Clein, Gerald Woolfson, Robert Sharpeand and John Adams, on a wide range of psychological disorders.

In addition he has worked in a more medical area using psychological approaches. These have included working with the Harley Street dermatologist Dr David Fenton on patients with skin and hair conditions where there may be some element of psychological difficulties in either dealing with an unwanted condition or where various stresses may lead to the problem. He has also worked with a number of hearing specialists, such as Johnathan Hazell, particularly attempting to help people with Tinnitus. Roy has attended patients at hospitals including the Nightingale, Priory and Cromwell.

While he continues to see patients in his practice, in recent years he has increasingly moved into the forensic area, psychologically assessing people with a variety of charges hanging over them such as violence, trauma, general criminal acts such as stealing and alleged sex crimes. He has a particular interest in the assessment and treatment of PTSD, treating both children and adults

Roy has also acted as consultant and psychologist for numerous television, news and media productions, including Wife Swap, School of Saatchi and CNN News, ranging from assessing candidates for reality TV to discussing issues on camera.

== Personal life ==
Roy is married to the Australian concert pianist Rosemary Tuck. He has two adult children from a previous relationship.

== Publications ==
- Roy Shuttleworth: A Systems Approach to Dramatherapy. Article: Dramatherapy: Theory and Practice 1 Sue Jennings, Routledge, 2014
- Roy Shuttleworth: Metaphor in Therapy. Article: Dramatherapy Vol.8 No. 1 (1985)
- Roy Shuttleworth: Drama Therapy in Northern Ireland: a Comparative Look at Group Process. Article: British Journal of Dramatherapy Vol. 7, No.2 pp24–30 (1984)
- Roy Shuttleworth: Wheels within Wheels: ASystems Approach to Maladjustment. Article : “Journal of Maladjustment and Education Vol.1 No. 2 (1983)
- Roy Shuttleworth: Psychodrama with Disturbed Adolescents. Article : Creative Therapy, compiled by Sue Jennings. Kemble Press Limited (1983)
- R.E. Shuttleworth: Adolescent Drama Therapy. Article : “Drama in Therapy, Volume Two” Schattner and Courtney, editors. DBS Publishers, New York (1981)
- Roy Shuttleworth: Dramatherapy in Professional Training Groups. Article: Dramatherapy Vol, No. 1 (1977)
