= Alfred Mellon =

English violinist, conductor and composer

Alfred Mellon (7 April 1820 – 24 March 1867) was a British violinist, conductor and composer.

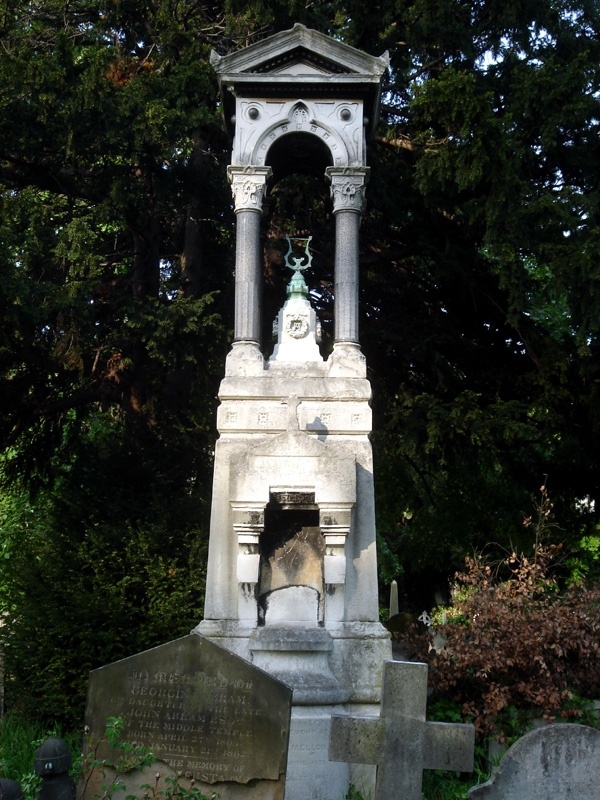
Funerary monument, Brompton Cemetery, London

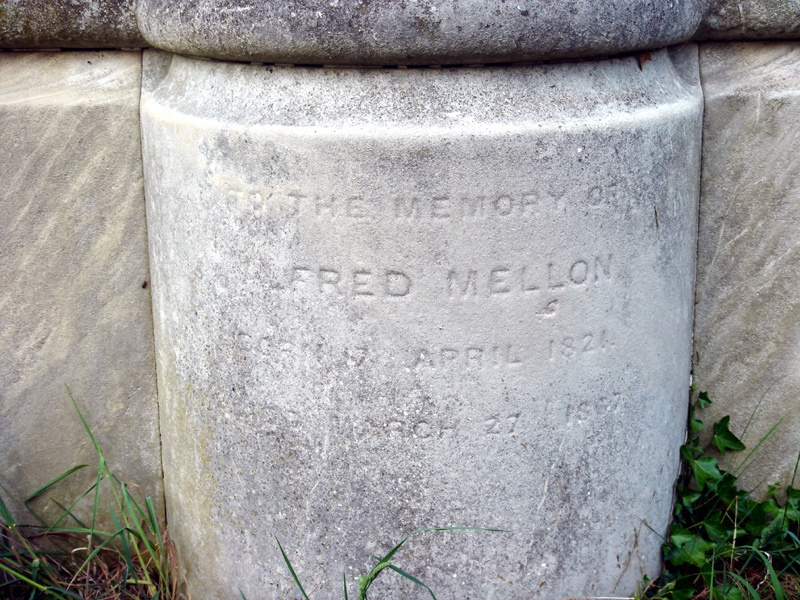
Funerary monument (detail)

Mellon was born in Birmingham, to a French father. At the age of 12 he joined the band at the Theatre Royal in that town, becoming leader at 16 before moving to London in 1844. He studied with Bernhard Molique in Stuttgart then returned to London to play the violin in the opera and other orchestras, and afterwards became leader of the ballet at the Royal Italian Opera, Covent Garden. Next, he was director of the music at the Haymarket and Adelphi theatres. He was subsequently conductor of the Royal English Opera, managed by singers Louisa Pyne and William Harrison who in 1859 produced his opera, "Victorine", at Covent Garden. He was conductor of the Musical Society, and of the Promenade Concerts, which for several seasons were given under his name at Covent Garden. In September 1865, he was chosen conductor of the Liverpool Philharmonic Society.

As a composer, Mellon wrote two operas - The Irish Dragoon (1845) and Victorine (1859), string quartets, piano pieces, glees (including 'Crown'd with clusters of the vine', 1850), ballads and songs for plays and farces.

He married Sarah Woolgar, a well-known actress on 28 July 1855. There were two daughters, the younger of which, Mary Woolgar Mellon, also became an actress. Mellon died at his home at The Vale, Chelsea, and is buried in Brompton Cemetery, London. He was so well-known and respected that thousands attended his funeral.
