= Jaguarita l'Indienne =

Three-act opéra comique

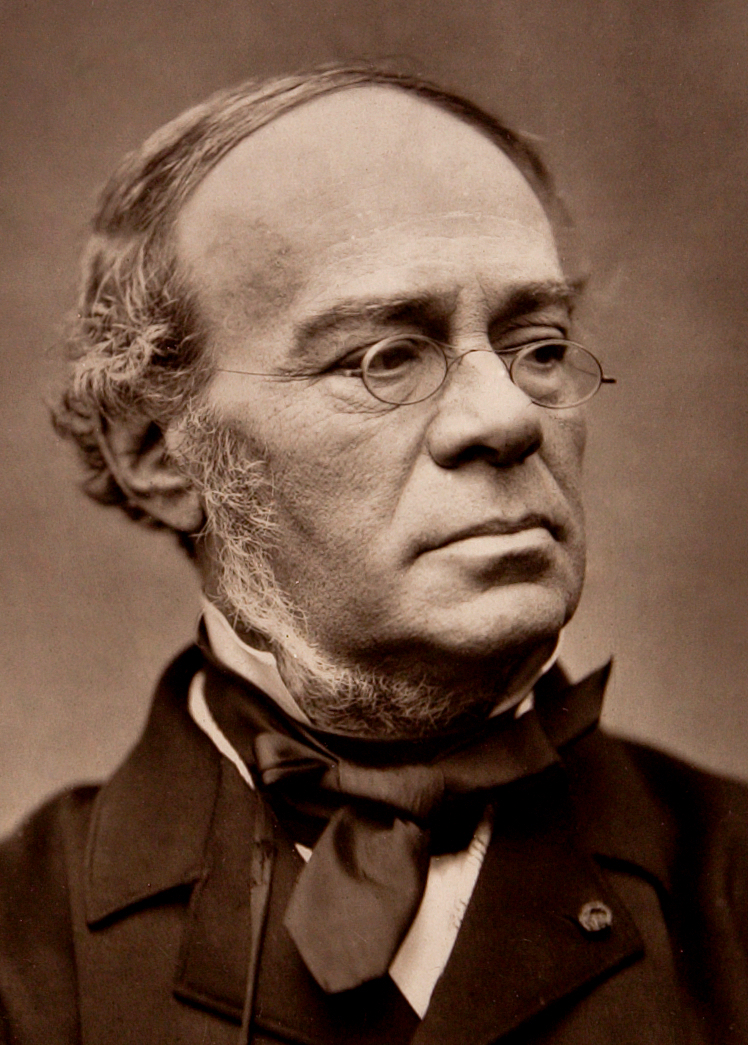
Fromental Halévy (c. 1860–62), by Étienne Carjat

Jaguarita l'Indienne is a three-act opéra comique, to a libretto by Jules-Henri Vernoy de Saint-Georges and Adolphe de Leuven, with music by Fromental Halévy.

The opera is somewhat satiric in its intentions, but the plot element of the love of an exotic queen for a European is also found in Meyerbeer's later opera L'Africaine.

An English version of the libretto, (moving the action to North America and substituting Oanita for Jaguarita) was set by Wallace in 1863 and produced at Covent Garden Theatre, under the title The Desert Flower.

== Performance history ==
The opera was premiered on 14 May 1855 at the Théâtre-Lyrique, Paris, with the soprano Marie Cabel in the title role, whose performance in the part was much admired by Berlioz in a contemporary review. The opera was also chosen as the opening performance of the rebuilt Théâtre La Monnaie in Brussels in 1856.

== Synopsis ==
Time: 1772
Place: Dutch Guyana

Jaguarita is the queen of a native tribe, but has been taken prisoner by the Dutch. With her henchman, Jumbo, she drugs her guard Maurice whom she kidnaps as part of her escape. Falling in love with Maurice, Jaguarita gets her tribesmen drunk and successfully subverts their attack on the Dutch settlement.
