= Rosemary Tuck =

Australian concert pianist

Rosemary Tuck is an Australian-British concert pianist and recording artist. She has researched and performed significant world premiere recordings, including the complete concerti and concertinos of Carl Czerny.

== Career ==
Born in Sydney, Rosemary Tuck studied in Canberra with John Winther, at the Peabody Institute, Baltimore with Walter Hautzig and in London with Andrzej Esterhazy, himself a pupil of Heinrich Neuhaus in Moscow. Since representing Australia in a series of concerts in America under the auspices of the Australian-American Bicentennial Foundation she has performed world-wide, including international festivals such as the Aarhus Festuge, the Wexford Festival, Liszt en Provence and Vendsyssel Festival. She has appeared as soloist with the Southbank Sinfonia, the English Chamber Orchestra, the ABC Sinfonia and the Orchestra of the City in London.

Tuck has given concert performances at Carnegie Hall, the Sydney Opera House, the South Bank Centre in London, National Concert Hall in Dublin and at the Aarhus Musikhuset in Denmark in the presence of Queen Margrethe II.

In 2001 she gave the first official performance in the William Vincent Wallace Millennium Plaza in Waterford, Ireland. Wallace is a composer she has championed widely, and this has included concerts in Dublin for his bicentennial year, and at the Liszt en Provence Festival, marking the 150th year of Wallace's death in the Pyrenees, France. Of her performances Gramophone Magazine noted: "Perhaps most striking is the dazzling Grande Fantasie La Cracovienne, composed for New Orleans in 1842. Strongly evoking Gottschalk, it has become almost as much Miss Tuck’s calling card as it was Wallace’s." Her Naxos CD Chopinesque was a Gramophone Critics Choice of the Year (2012).

Tuck has worked closely with Richard Bonynge, AC, CBE, both as soloist with orchestra and collaborative pianist since a concert in London in 2004 of music by William Vincent Wallace titled "A Concert for Sir Richard Bourke", for the Tait Memorial Trust.

She has also collaborated with the Australian writer Brian Matthews, featuring in a radio play commissioned by the ABC on the life of pianist Eileen Joyce.

In 2020 she was Artistic Director and soloist for Richard Bonynge's 90th Birthday Gala.

Her recordings include many world premiere performances, and she has championed the composers Lyadov (for Barrington-Coupes Concert Artist label), Ketèlbey, William Vincent Wallace, and Carl Czerny's works for piano and orchestra with the English Chamber Orchestra under Richard Bonynge for Naxos, four of which reached the UK Specialist Classical Charts. The penultimate disc in the series, featuring Czerny's Second Grand Concerto, was a Musicweb International Recording of the Year 2020

Naxos reissued a compilation album of her Marco Polo Ketelbey recordings in 2021. Titled A Dream Picture, it was Scala Radio's Album of the Week in July that year.

During 2021 she commissioned a piano concerto from Australian composer Andrew Schultz drawing on an earlier uncompleted work by Richard Meale, with assistance from the Australian Music Foundation. She gave the world premiere performance in London's Cadogan Hall on October 15, 2025 with the New London Orchestra under Adrian Brown.

She has been on the committee of the Tait Memorial Trust since 2004, assisting young Australian and New Zealand Artists.

== Personal life ==
Rosemary is married to the psychologist Roy Shuttleworth.

== Recordings ==
Carl Czerny: Concertinos Opp. 78 and 650 ECO/Richard Bonynge – Naxos 8.574458

Ketelbey: A Dream Picture – Naxos 8.574299 1995/2021

Carl Czerny: Second Grand Concerto in E flat major ECO/Richard Bonynge – Naxos 8.573998 2019

Carl Czerny: Piano Concerto in D minor ECO/Richard Bonynge - Naxos 8.573688 2017

Carl Czerny: Grand Concerto in A minor ECO/Richard Bonynge -Naxos 8.573417 2016

Carl Czerny: Bel Canto Concertante Naxos ECO/Richard Bonynge – Naxos 8.573254 2015

William Vincent Wallace: Chopinesque - Naxos 8.572776 2012

William Vincent Wallace: Celtic Fantasies – Naxos 8.572775 2012

William Vincent Wallace: Opera Fantasies and Paraphrases – Naxos 8.572774 2011

William Vincent Wallace: To My Star – Cala 88044 2005

William Vincent Wallace: The Meeting of the Waters – Cala 88042 2002

Albert Ketelbey: Piano Music Vol. 2 – Marco Polo 8.223700 1995

Albert Ketelbey: Piano Music Vol. 1 – Marco Polo 8.223699 1995

Lyadov: Lyadov Recital (Vol.2) – Concert Artist 9001 (1990)

Lyadov: Lyadov Recital (Vol.1) – Concert Artist FED4-TC-070 (1989)

== Publications ==
Backstage With Rosemary Tuck – Limelight Magazine, 29 November 2019

In The Mystical Land of Oz – Limelight Magazine, 9 July 2021

The Lost Emperor: Rhinegold - 24 October 2019, archived 27 June 2022

CD booklet notes for the Naxos releases 8. 573417, 8.573688, 8.573998, 8.574458

Richard Meale's Unfinished Concerto Takes Flight - Limelight Magazine, September 24, 2025
