= Caroline Richings =

American composer and musician (died 1882)

Caroline Mary Reynoldson Richings Bernard (13 May 1827 or 1832 - 14 January 1882), known professionally as Caroline Richings, was an Anglo-American composer, impresario, pianist and singer who managed her own opera company, sang in it, and composed works for it.

== Biography ==
Richings was born in Kensington, London, England, to composer Thomas Herbert Reynoldson and Caroline Louisa Fairbrother. The actor Peter Richings adopted her as an infant and they moved to America in 1833.

Little is known about Richings’ education. In 1847, she debuted as a pianist in Philadelphia. In 1852 she made her operatic debut as Marie in Gaetano Donizetti’s La Fille du Regiment.

Richings sang in the Richings Grand Opera, which was founded by her adoptive father. She married Peter Bernard, a tenor with the company, on 25 December 1867. When her father retired in 1867, she took over the management of Richings Grand Opera. In 1874, she founded the Caroline Richings Old Folks Company, which performed light opera and concerts. She taught piano and voice in Baltimore, Maryland, and Richmond, Virginia, where she was also a principal singer for the Mozart Association. She and Bernard opened the Richings-Bernard Conservatory of Music in Richmond. Her final performance was in 1881 in The Duchess, an opera she composed. She died of smallpox on 14 January 1882. She was buried in Hollywood Cemetery.

Riching’s works were published by Brainard’s Sons Company, Forgotten Books, and the John F. Ellis & Company.

== Books ==
- Oldde Folkes Tune Book Containing a Choice Collection of Songs and Choruses, as Sung by the Oldde Folkes at Their Popular Concerts

== Opera ==
- The Duchess

== Vocal ==
- “As Painting in the Sultry Beam”
- “O Word of God Incarnate”
- See the Pensive Moon Reclining (for choir)
