= Willoughby Weiss =

English operatic bass

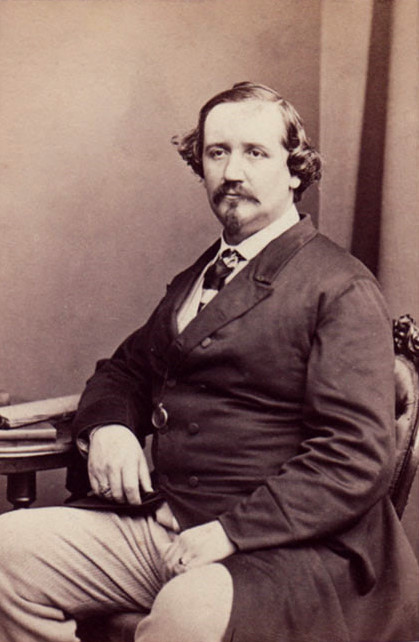
Willoughby Weiss

Willoughby Hunter Weiss (2 April 1820, Liverpool – 24 October 1867, London) was an English oratorio and opera singer and composer. He became one of the most celebrated bass singers of the 19th century, and sang in the premieres of many English works.

== Life ==
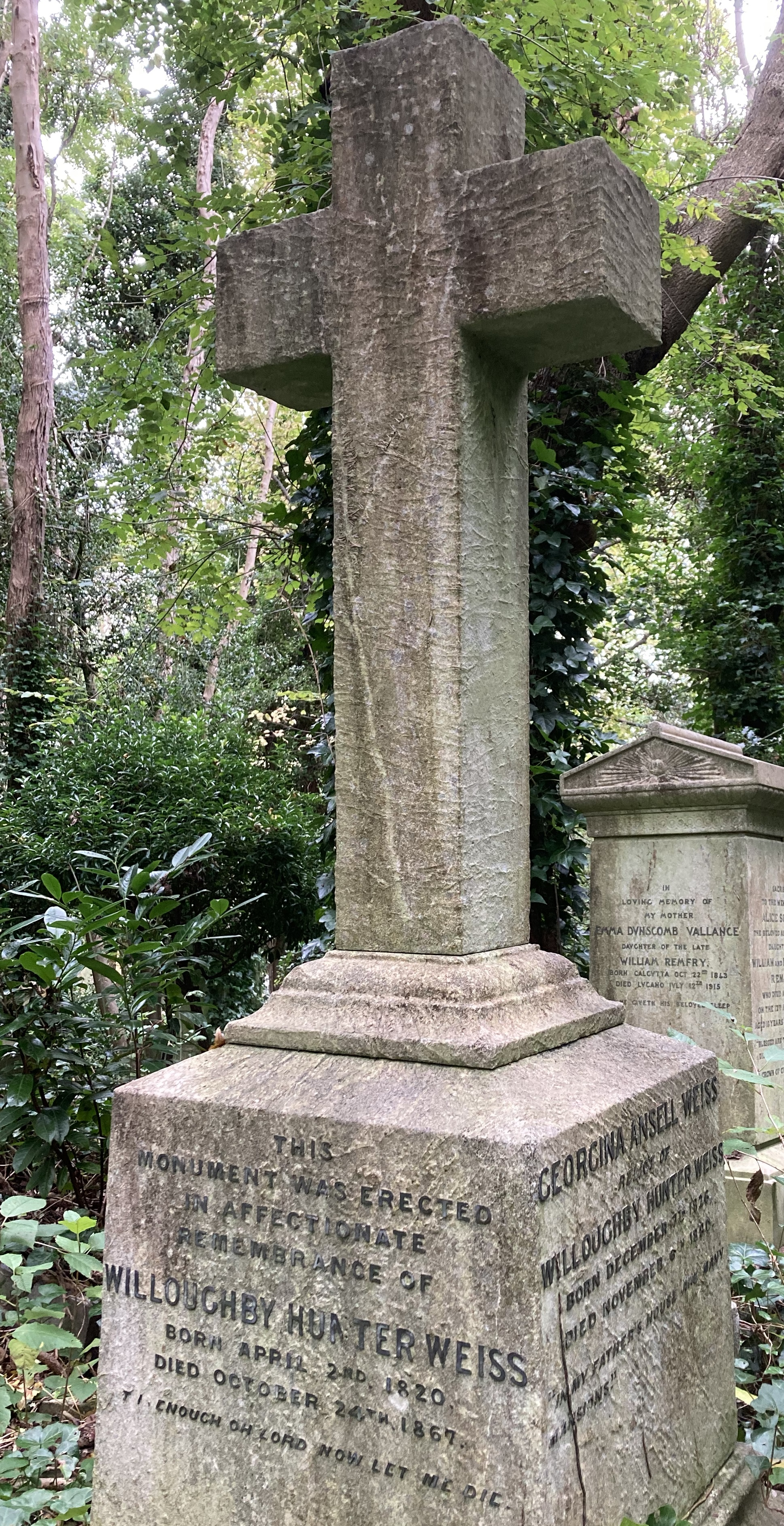
Grave of Willoughby Hunter Weiss in Highgate Cemetery

He was born in Liverpool, the son of Willoughby Gaspard Weiss Esq., a professor of flute and a music publisher. He studied under Sir George Thomas Smart and Michael Balfe.

Weiss made his operatic debut in Dublin in 1842 as Oroveso, and in London at the Prince's Theatre at that time as Count Rodolfo in La sonnambula. H. F. Chorley saw him as Oroveso in an English Norma at the Princess's Theatre, London, opposite Adelaide Sartoris, saying 'he sang well and looked like a giraffe.' In 1845 he married Georgina Ansell Barrett. Mme Georgina Weiss (1826–1880), a soprano, often sang with her husband, and made her stage debut at Drury Lane in 1847.

In 1846 he appeared at Drury Lane opposite Anna Bishop in the premiere of Lewis Henry Lavenu's opera Loretta:A Tale of Seville, as Don Juanito. In 1847 he supported Sims Reeves there, at his debut in a leading role (Edgardo) in Lucia di Lammermoor (with Dorus Gras and Henry Whitworth), conducted by Hector Berlioz, in Louis Antoine Jullien's company: soon afterwards Reeves and Weiss sang together again in the premiere of Balfe's opera Maid of Honour.

In 1854 he set Henry Wadsworth Longfellow's poem "The Village Blacksmith" to music, from which he made a considerable fortune. In that year Weiss was in Jarrett's company at Drury Lane, with Reeves, Agnes Büry, Mme Rudersdorff, Louisa Pyne and others, in a season including Lucia, Fra Diavolo, La sonnambula, Il Seraglio and Masaniello. On New Year's Day 1856, with Reeves, Novello and Lewis Thomas, he gave a performance of Méhul's 1807 opera Joseph (with bowdlerized libretto) at Windsor Castle. Reeves, Clara Novello, Mme Sainton-Dolby and Weiss gave the premiere of William Sterndale Bennett's cantata The May Queen at the founding of the Leeds Festival, in 1858. In January 1861 he sang the Messiah at St Paul's Cathedral, the first oratorio to be heard there, with Reeves, Helen Lemmens-Sherrington and Mrs Lockey.

The fellow-Liverpudlian Charles Santley, who often sang with him (and refers to his 'well-merited position as the leading (English) basso of his time'), called him 'a fine, handsome fellow, about six foot two in height, slim in his youth.' Weiss was a leading baritone in the Pyne and Harrison Opera Company at Covent Garden in the late 1850s to early 1860s.

Santley and Weiss gave famous performances of Handel's duet 'The Lord is a Man of War' from Israel in Egypt, perhaps first at the opening of Leeds Town Hall by Queen Victoria in 1858. In the centennial Handel Festival at the Crystal Palace in 1859 he was the bass soloist, with Mmes Novello, Sainton-Dolby, Sims Reeves and Giovanni Belletti, in the Messiah, Israel in Egypt and Judas Maccabaeus. Shortly before his early death, Weiss performed an extensive programme of sacred music, including a complete Elijah, at Hereford Festival, and again an Elijah and a St. Paul at the Birmingham Festival.

He is buried on the western side of Highgate Cemetery.
