= William Harrison (singer) =

English opera singer (1813–1868)

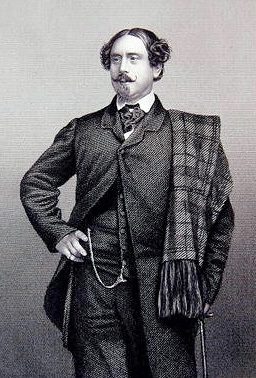
Harrison in 1861

William Harrison (15 June 1813 – 9 November 1868) was an English tenor and opera impresario. He was best known for creating roles in new operas by British composers from the 1840s to the early 1860s. Among those who composed for him were William Vincent Wallace, Michael William Balfe and Julius Benedict. After working for Alfred Bunn at the Theatre Royal, Drury Lane, Harrison set up a company in partnership with the soprano Louisa Pyne, which enjoyed success in North America and London in the 1850s.

== Life and career ==
Harrison was born in Marylebone, London, the son of a coal merchant. He appeared in public as an amateur tenor in 1836 and in October of that year he became a student at the Royal Academy of Music, then headed by Cipriani Potter. He made his professional debut the following year, singing with the Sacred Harmonic Society. His first operatic work was at Covent Garden in May 1839 in the premiere of William Michael Rooke's Henrique. The librettist and impresario Alfred Bunn recruited him for his opera seasons at Drury Lane in the 1840s, during which Harrison created tenor leads in Balfe's The Bohemian Girl (1843), Wallace's Maritana (1845) and other new works.

in 1854 Harrison and the soprano Louisa Pyne led a company of British singers to North America. They opened in New York on 9 October with a repertory of light Italian and French operas, sung in English, together with The Bohemian Girl, Maritana and The Beggar's Opera. This venture was successful. In the summer season of 1855 the company had a 125-night run in New York and they toured throughout the next three years in major cities of Canada and the US. Returning to England in 1857 they staged similar repertory in London for the next seven seasons, premiering fifteen new British operas.

By the 1860s Harrison's voice was in decline, and composers such as Julius Benedict in The Lily of Killarney (1862) wrote less demanding roles for him. His last appearance was in Liverpool, in May 1868, singing Fritz in The Grand Duchess of Gerolstein.

Harrison married Ellen, daughter of the actress Maria Clifford. They had two sons: the elder, William, became rector of Clovelly; the younger son, Clifford, became a professional reciter. Harrison died of pneumonia at his home in Kentish Town, north London.
