= William Vincent Wallace =

Irish composer (1812–1865)

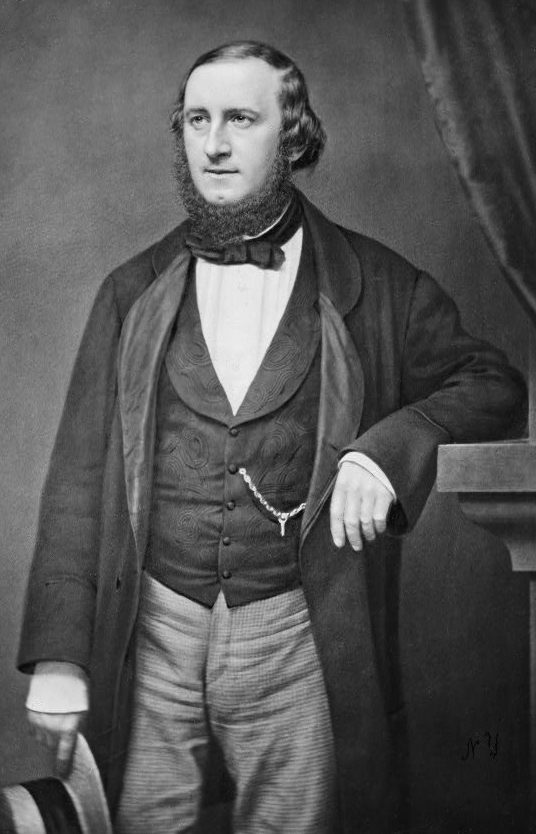
William Vincent Wallace. Portrait by Mathew Brady, New York City, undated (Library of Congress)

William Vincent Wallace (11 March 1812 – 12 October 1865) was an Irish composer and pianist. In his day, he was famous on three continents as a double virtuoso on violin and piano. Nowadays, he is mainly remembered as an opera composer of note, with key works such as Maritana (1845) and Lurline (1847/60), but he also wrote a large amount of piano music (including some virtuoso pieces) that was much in vogue in the 19th century. His more modest output of songs and ballads, equally wide-ranging in style and difficulty, was also popular in his day, some numbers being associated with famous singers of the time.

== Early life ==
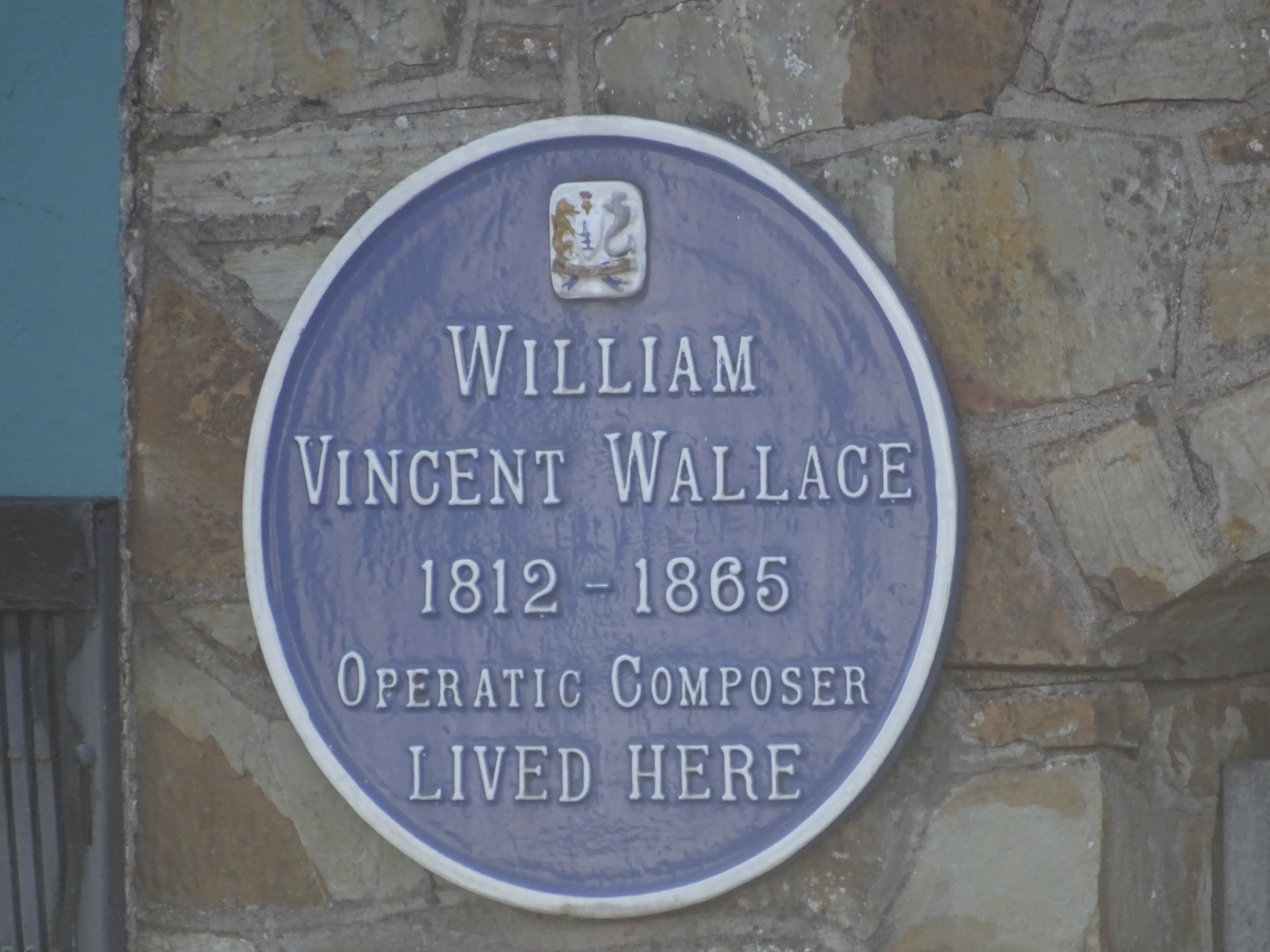
Blue plaque in Waterford

Wallace was born at Colbeck Street, Waterford, Ireland. Both of his parents were Irish; his father, Spencer Wallace of County Mayo, one of four children, who was born in Killala, County Mayo in 1789, became a regimental bandmaster with the North Mayo Militia based in Ballina. William was born while the regiment was stationed for one year in Waterford, one of several successive postings in Ireland and the UK. The family returned to Ballina some four years later, in 1816, and William spent his formative years there, taking an active part in his father's band and already composing pieces by the age of nine for the band recitals.

The band, having a reputation for high standards, apart from regimental duties would have featured at social events in big houses in the area. Under the tuition of his father and uncle, he wrote pieces for the bands and orchestras of his native area. Wallace became accomplished in playing various band instruments before the family left the Army in 1826 (their regiment then being the 29th Foot), moving from Waterford to Dublin, and becoming active in music in the capital.

Wallace learned to play several instruments as a boy, including the violin, clarinet, organ, and piano. In 1830, at the age of 18, he became organist of the Roman Catholic Cathedral at Thurles, County Tipperary, and taught music at the Ursuline Convent there. He fell in love with a pupil, Isabella Kelly, whose father consented to their marriage in 1832 on condition that Wallace become a Roman Catholic. The couple soon moved to Dublin, where Wallace was employed as a violinist at the Theatre Royal.

== Career and travels ==
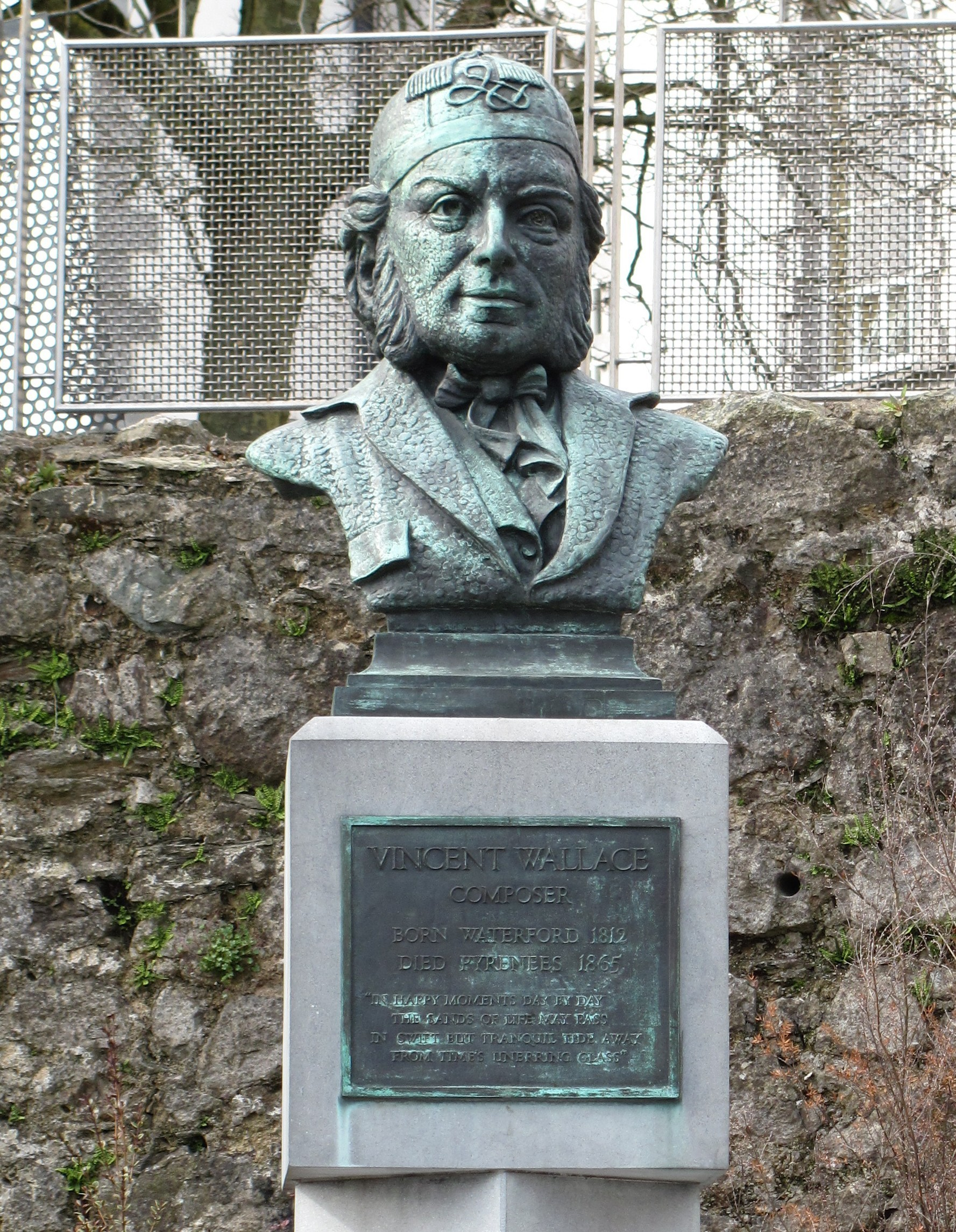
A bust of Wallace by Seamus Murphy can be seen outside Waterford's Theatre Royal

Economic conditions in Dublin having deteriorated after the Act of Union of 1800, the whole Wallace family decided to emigrate to Australia in 1835. Wallace, together with his wife Isabella and young son, Willy, travelled as free emigrants from Liverpool in July. His father, with his second wife Matilda and one child, travelled with the rest of the family, Elizabeth, a soprano, and Wellington, a flautist, as bounty emigrants from Cork that autumn. The composer's party first landed at Hobart, Tasmania in late October, where they stayed several months, and then moved on to Sydney in January 1836, where, following the arrival of the rest of the family in February, the Wallaces opened the first Australian music academy in April. Wallace had already given many celebrity concerts in Sydney, and, being the first virtuoso to visit the Colony, became known as the "Australian Paganini". His sister Elizabeth, at age 19, in 1839 married an Australian singer John Bushelle, with whom she gave many recitals before his early death in 1843 on a tour of van Diemen's Land. Wallace was also active in the business of importing pianos from London, but his main activity involved many recitals in and around Sydney under the patronage of the Governor, General Sir Richard Bourke. The most significant musical events of this period were two large oratorio concerts at St. Mary's (Roman Catholic) Cathedral in Sydney in 1836 and 1838, on behalf of the organ fund, which were directed by Wallace, and which utilized all the available musical talent of the Colony, including the recently formed Philharmonic [Choral] Society.

In 1838, he separated from his wife, and began a roving career that took him around the globe. Wallace claimed that from Australia he went to New Zealand on a whaling-voyage in the South seas and while there encountered the Maori tribe Te Aupouri, and having crossed the Pacific, he visited Chile, Argentina, Peru, Jamaica, and Cuba, giving concerts in the large cities of those countries. In 1841, he conducted a season of Italian opera in Mexico City. Moving on to the United States, he stayed at New Orleans for some years, where he was feted as a virtuoso on violin and piano, before reaching New York, where he was equally celebrated, and published his first compositions (1843–44).

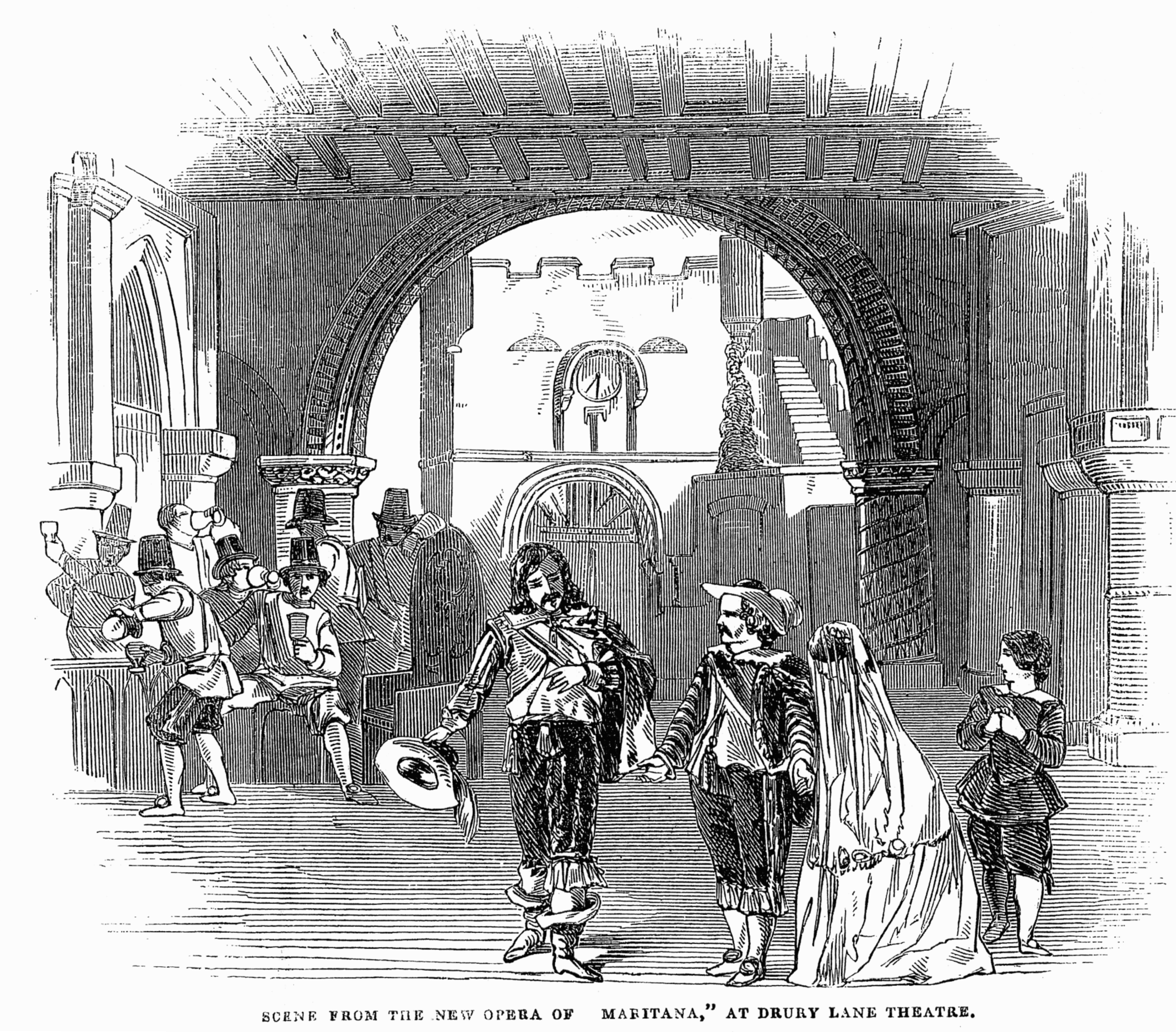
Scene from Maritana (1845): The wedding of Don Cæsar and Maritana

He arrived in London in 1845 and made various appearances as a pianist. In November of that year, his opera Maritana was performed at Drury Lane with great success, and was later presented internationally, including Dublin (1846), Vienna, Austria (1848), and in Australia. Wallace's sister, Elisabeth, appeared at Covent Garden in the title role in 1848. Maritana was followed by Matilda of Hungary (1847), Lurline (1847/60), The Amber Witch (1861), Love's Triumph (1862) and The Desert Flower (1863) (based on the libretto of Halévy's Jaguarita l'Indienne). He also published numerous compositions for the piano.

Vincent Wallace was a cultivated man and an accomplished musician, whose work as an operatic composer, at a period by no means encouraging to music in England, has a distinct historical value. Like Michael William Balfe, he was born an Irishman, and his reputation as one of the few composers known beyond the United Kingdom of Great Britain and Ireland at that time is naturally coupled with Balfe's.

== Later life ==
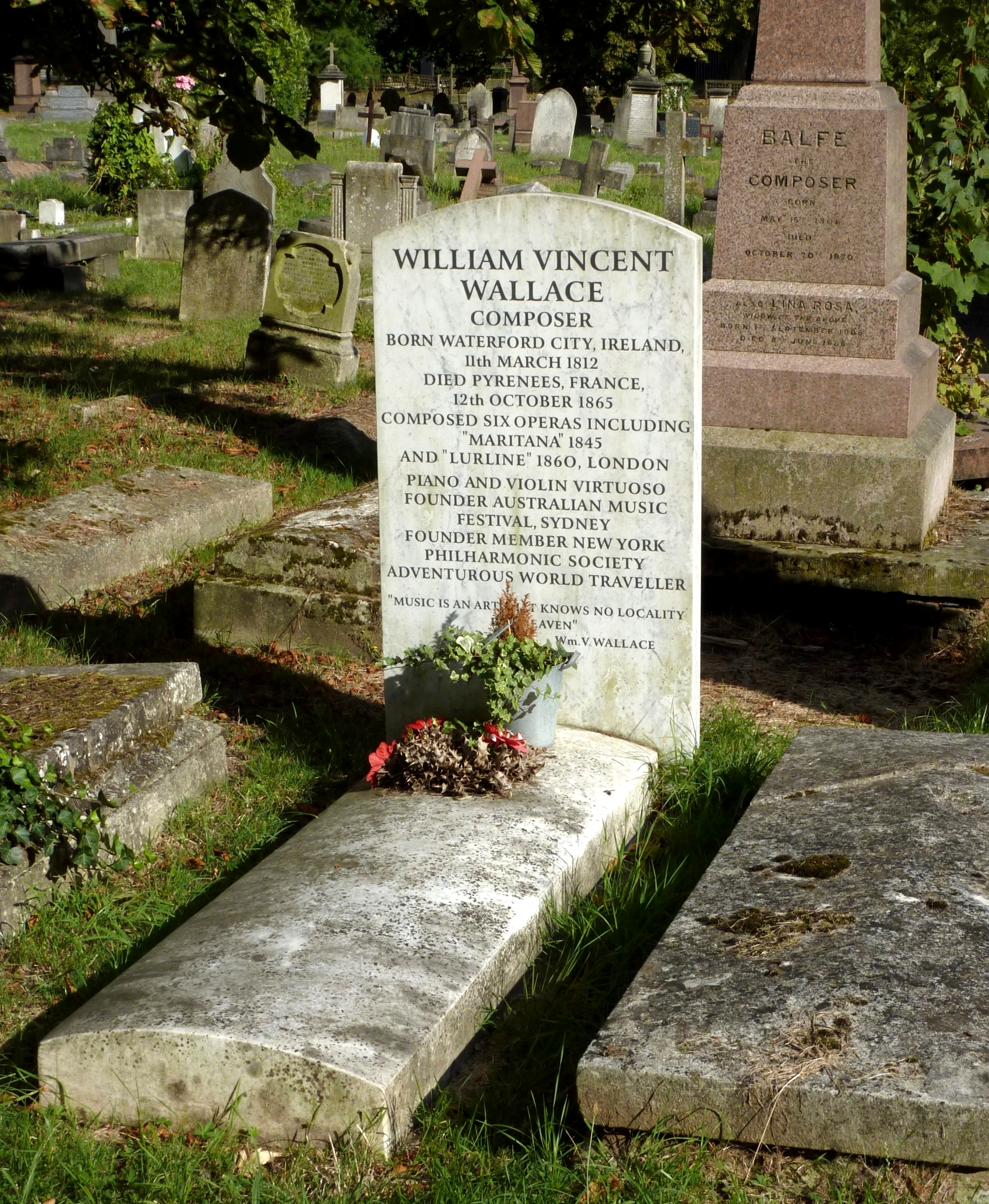
Wallace's grave at Kensal Green Cemetery, London, in 2014; visible behind it is Balfe's grave

In 1854, Wallace became an American citizen after a (most likely common-law) marriage in New York with the German-born pianist Hélène Stoepel, sister of composer Robert Stoepel. In New York, in 1843–44, he had been associated with the early concert seasons of the New York Philharmonic Society, and in 1853 was elected an Honorary (Life) Member of the Society. In later years, having returned to Europe for the premieres of his later operas, he developed a heart condition, for which he received treatment in Paris in 1864. He died in poor circumstances at the Château de Bagen, Sauveterre de Comminges, in the Haute Garonne (the home of Hélène's sister, Marie-Therese, Baroness de Saintegeme), on 12 October 1865, leaving two widows, a son, Willy, from his first marriage who died in 1909, and two sons by Hélène, Clarence Sutherland and Vincent St. John, the latter of whom, faced with a terminal condition in the French hospital in San Francisco in 1897, committed suicide. Wallace was buried in Kensal Green Cemetery, London; the epitaph on his recently refurbished headstone (from 2007) now reads "Music is an art that knows no locality but heaven – Wm. V. Wallace".

== Selected compositions ==
Opera

- Maritana, opera, 3 acts (London: Drury Lane, 15 November 1845) (publ. 1846)
- Matilda [of Hungary] (Alfred Bunn), opera, 3 acts (London: Drury Lane, 22 February 1847) (publ. 1847)
- Lurline (Edward Fitzball), opera, 3 acts (1847, completed 1860) (London: Covent Garden, 23 February 1860) (publ. 1859)
- The Amber Witch (Henry Fothergill Chorley), opera, 4 acts (London: Her Majesty's, 28 February 1861) (publ. 1861)
- Love's Triumph (James Robinson Planché), opera, 3 acts (London: Covent Garden, 3 November 1862) (publ. 1862)
- The Desert Flower (Augustus Harris & Thomas J. Williams), opera, 3 acts (1862–63) (London: Covent Garden, 12 October 1863) (publ. 1864)
- five further operas (or operettas) that were either not completed or not performed as follows: The Maid of Zurich, Gulnare, Olga, The King's Page, Estrella.

Orchestral music

- Violin Concerto (Souvenir de New York) (1844)
- Concertino for violin (1860)

Songs for voice and piano

- Echo's Song (Robert Stewart) (Sydney, c. 1836)
- A Fireside Song (Henry Fothergill Chorley) (London, c. 1850)
- Cradle Song (Alfred Tennyson) (New York, 1851)
- The Flag of Our Union (George Pope Morris) (New York, 1851)
- Alary's Celebrated Polka Aria (New York, 1852)
- The Carrier Dove: A Lay of the Minstrel (George Pope Morris) (New York, 1852)
- Annie Dear, Good Bye (Edward Fitzball) (New York, 1854)
- Album 1854, Respectfully Dedicated to the Ladies of the United States, New York: William Hall, 1854; see below for "Edition (with CD)". Contains: Joyful, Joyful Spring, canzonet (Henry C. Watson); It is the Happy Summer Time, canzonet (Watson); The Leaves are Turning Red, canzonet (Watson); The Spring and Summer Both are Past, canzonet (Watson); Say my Heart Can this be Love, ballad (Watson); Sisters of Mercy, trio (Edward Fitzball); 'Tis the Harp in the Air. Souvenir de Maritana, la romance favorite (piano solo); La Pluie d'or. Valse gracieuse (piano solo); The Village Festival. Schottisch (piano solo).
- The Daughters of Eve (G. Hodder) (London, 1858)
- The Bell Ringer (John Oxenford) (London, 1860)
- The Coming of the Flowers (J. E. Carpenter) (London, 1860)
- The Song of May (Wellington Guernsey) (London, 1864)

Piano music

- El Amistad. Valse (New York: Firth & Hall, 1844)
- La Chilena. Waltz (New York: Firth & Pond, 1844)
- La Petite polka de concert, Op. 13 (London: Cramer & Beale, 1847)
- La Gondola. Souvenir de Venice, Op. 18 (New York: Firth, Hall & Pond, 1844)
- Chant des pèlerins. Nocturne, Op. 19 (New York: Firth & Hall, 1844)
- Trois Nocturnes, Op. 20 (New York: Firth & Hall, 1844; also London: Martin & Co., 1851)
- Le Rêve. Romance, Op. 21 (New York: Firth & Hall, 1844)
- The Midnight Waltz (New York: Firth & Pond, 1844)
- La Mexicana. Waltz (New York: Firth, Hall & Pond, 1844)
- Deux Romances, Op. 25. 1: Toujours; 2: À mon étoile (New York: Firth & Hall, 1844; also London: Martin & Co., 1851)
- Chant d'amour. Romance, Op. 26 (Paris: Richault, 1845)
- Grand valse de concert, Op. 27 (New York: Firth & Hall, 1845)
- Grande fantaisie et variations sur La Cracovienne (Philadelphia, 1847)
- Grande fantaisie sur des motifs de l'opéra Maritana, Op. 29 (Vienna, c.1848)
- Grande nocturne, Op. 32 (London, 1848)
- Ange si pure, de Donizetti (London, 1848)
- Romance, Op. 36 (London: Cramer, Beale & Co., 1847)
- Au bord de la mer, Op. 37 (Vienna, 1848; also London: Chappell, 1849)
- Angelina's Solitude (London, 1850)
- The Blue Bells of Scotland, Op. 40 (London: Robert Cocks, 1847)
- Alpine Melody (New York: William Hall, 1851)
- Le Zéphyr. Nocturne, Op. 47 (Vienna, 1848; also London: Chappell, 1848)
- 1ère Grande polka de concert, Op. 48 (New York: William Hall, 1850; also Vienna: A. Diabelli, 1851)
- The Evening Star Schottisch (New York: William Hall, 1852)
- Mélodie irlandaise (= Come o'er the Sea), Op. 53 (New York: William Hall, 1850)
- Les Cloches du monastère. Nocturne, Op. 54 (London, c.1851)
- The Angler's Polka (New York: William Hall, 1854)
- Woodland Sketches, Op. 57 (New York: William Hall, 1851). Contains: 1. Village Maidens' Song; 2. Music Murmurings in the Trees
- 24 Preludes and Scales, Op. 61 (New York: William Hall, 1855; also Leipzig, 1874)
- Midnight Chimes. Impromptu, Op. 62 (New York: William Hall, 1859)
- Fantaisie brillante sur des motifs de l'opera La Traviata de Verdi, Op. 63 (London, 1857)
- 2ème Polka de Concert, Op. 68 (New York: William Hall, 1852)
- Souvenir de Varsovie. Mazurka, Op. 69 (New York: William Hall, 1854; also Leipzig, 1874)
- The Celebrated Witches' Dance Composed by Paganini, Op. 71 No. 3 (New York: William Hall, 1852; also Leipzig, c.1854)
- 3ème Grande Polka de concert, Op. 72 (New York: William Hall, 1854; also Leipzig, c.1854)
- The Last Rose of Summer, Op. 74 (Hamburg: Schuberth & Co., 1856)
- Souvenir de Naples. Barcarole, Op. 75 (New York: William Hall, 1854)
- Six Études de Salon, Op. 77 (New York: William Hall, 1853). Contains: La Grâce; La Rapidité; La Force; Il Sostenuto; La Classique; Les Arpèges.
- Ballade de Rigoletto, Op. 82 (New York: William Hall, 1855)
- The Favorite Irish Melodies 'Coolun', 'Garry Owen', 'St. Patrick's Day' (London: Robert Cocks, 1859)
- Recollections of Switzerland (London: Robert Cocks, 1859)
- Air de ballet (London: Robert Cocks, 1864)
- Air russe (London: Duff & Stewart, 1868)
- Polka de concert (Glissando), Op. 91 (Leipzig, 1880)

== Edition (with CD) ==
- Album 1854, Respectfully Dedicated to the Ladies of the United States, New York: William Hall, 1854; facsimile reprint ed. by Una Hunt with foreword by Richard Bonynge, music and CD notes by Peter Jaggard, and accompanying CD of all the pieces performed by Máire Flavin (mezzo), Royal Irish Academy of Music Vocal Trio, Una Hunt (piano); Dublin: Heritage Music Productions and RTÉ lyric fm, 2012. Direct link.

== Recordings ==
Opera recordings

- Highlights from The Bohemian Girl, Maritana, The Lily of Killarney, featuring selections from operas by Michael Balfe, Wallace, and Julius Benedict respectively. Performed by Veronica Dunne (soprano), Uel Dean (tenor), Eric Hinds (baritone), unnanmed Orchestra, Havelock Nelson (cond.) on EMI/Odeon CSD 3651, LP (1968)
- Classics on the Battlefield which features Serenade from "Maritana" (arranged by Gustavus W. Ingals) as well as music by Mozart, Meyerbeer, Schubert, Balfe, Haydn, Rossini, Graffula, von Weber, Bellini, Johann Crüger, Verdi, Mendelssohn, Donizetti and von Suppé. 1st Brigade Band, Dan Woopert (bandmaster). Making History Live Series, volume 11. Heritage Military Music Foundation, CD (1991)
- Maritana, performed by Majella Cullagh (soprano), Lynda Lee (mezzo), Paul Charles Clarke (tenor), Ian Caddy (baritone), Damien Smith (baritone), Quentin Hayes (bass), RTÉ Philharmonic Choir, RTÉ Concert Orchestra, Proinnsías Ó Duinn (cond.); on: Marco Polo 8.223406-7, CD (1996), re-issued on Naxos 8.660308-9, CD (2011).
- The Power of Love (= selections from Maritana, Lurline, The Amber Witch, Love's Triumph), performed by Deborah Riedel (soprano), Australian Opera and Ballet Orchestra, Richard Bonynge (cond.), on: Melba 301082, CD (2000).
- Lurline, performed by Sally Silver (soprano), Fiona Janes (mezzo), Bernadette Cullen (mezzo), Keith Lewis (tenor), Paul Ferris (tenor), David Soar (baritone), Donald Maxwell (baritone), Roderick Earle (bass), Victorian Opera and Orchestra, Richard Bonynge (cond.); Naxos 8.660293-4, CD (2010).
- British Opera Overtures, performed by Victorian Opera Orchestra, Richard Bonynge (cond.), on: Somm Célèste SOMMCD 0123, CD (2013). Contains overtures to Lurline, The Amber Witch, Love's Triumph; also overtures by Balfe, Barnett, Benedict, Goring Thomas, Loder, Macfarren.

Other vocal recordings

- Songs by William Vincent Wallace, performed by Sally Silver (soprano), Richard Bonynge (piano), on: Somm Célèste SOMMCD 0131, CD (2013). Contains: Why do I Weep for Thee?; The Gipsy Maid; Cradle Song; Go! Though Restless Wind; Happy Birdling of the Forest; Softly Ye Night Winds; The Star of Love; Orange Flowers; It is the Happy Summer Time; The Leaves are Turning Red; The Spring and Summer Both are Past; Wild Flowers; Good Night and Pleasant Dreams; The Winds that Waft my Sighs to Thee; Old Friends and Other Days; Alice; Over the Silvery Lake; Through the Pathless Forest Drear (from opera The Desert Flower); Bird of the Wild Wing; Seabirds Wing their Way.

Piano recordings

- The Meeting of the Waters. Celtic Piano, performed by Rosemary Tuck, on Cala United CACD 88042, CD (2002). Contains: The Minstrel Boy & Rory O'More; The Bard's Legacy; Coolun & Gary Owen & St. Patrick's Day; The Meeting of the Waters & Eveleen's Bower; Mélodie Irlandaise; Annie Laurie; Roslin Castle & A Highland Lad My Love was Born; Homage to Burns: Impromptu on 'Somebody' and 'O, For Ane and Twenty Tam'; The Keel Row; Ye Banks and Braes; Charlie is My Darling & The Campbells are Coming; My Love is Like a Red, Red Rose & Come O'er the Stream, Charlie; Comin' thro' the Rye; The Last Rose of Summer; Kate Kearney & Tow, Row, Row; Robin Adair; Auld Lang Syne & The Highland Laddie.
- To My Star. Celtic Romance, performed by Rosemary Tuck, on: Cala Records CACD 88044, CD (2005). Contains: La Louisiana; Music Murmerings in the Trees; Mazurka-Étude; L'Absence et le retour; To My Star (À mon etoile); La Rapidité; La Force; A Flower of Poland (Une fleur de Pologne); Nocturne dramatique; The Empress (L'Imperatrice); The Shepherd's Lament (La Plainté du berger); Souvenir of Spain (El nuevo jaleo de Jerez); The Bee and the Rose; Valse militaire; La Cracovienne.
- Opera Fantasies and Paraphrases, performed by Rosemary Tuck, partially with Richard Bonynge (pianos), on: Naxos 8.572774, CD (2011). Contains: Fantaisie brillante sur des motifs de l'opéra La traviata de Verdi; Souvenir de Bellini. Fantaisie de salon sur l'opéra La sonnambula; Souvenir de l'opéra. Fantaisie de salon sur l'opéra Lucia di Lammermoor; Nabucco de Verdi: Va pensiero; Variations brillantes pour le piano à quatre mains sur la Barcarolle de l'opéra L'Elisir d'amore de Donizetti; Rigoletto de Verdi. Quatuor: Bella figlia dell'amore; The Night Winds. Nocturne for piano from Wallace's Lurline; Fantaisie de salon sur des thèmes de l'opéra Don Pasquale; Grande fantaisie sur de thèmes de l'opéra Maritana; Grande duo pour deux pianos sur l'opéra d'Halévy L'Éclair.
- Celtic Fantasies, performed by Rosemary Tuck, partially with Richard Bonynge (pianos), on: Naxos 8.572775, CD (2012). Contains: The Yellow-Hair'd Lassie & Whistle and I Come to you, my Lad; Brilliant Fantasia on My Nanny O! & My Ain Kind Dearie & Bonnie Dundee; The Gloomy Night is Gathering Fast & The Lass o' Gowrie; Go Where the Glory Waits Thee & Love's Young Dream; When Ye Gang Awa' Jamie; The Harp that Once Through Tara's Halls & Fly Not Yet; Desmond's Song; Believe Me if All those Endearing Young Charms & An Irish Melody; The Blue Bells of Scotland; Fantaisie Brillante de Salon pour Piano sur des Melodies Ecossaises Roy's Wife and We're a'Noddin'; John Anderson My Jo & Thou Hast Left Me forever, Jamie; The Weary Pund o' Tow & There's Nae Luck about this House; Flow on, thou Shining River & Nora Creina; Maggie Lauder; Rondino on the Scotch Melody Bonnie Prince Charlie; Kinloch of Kinloch & I'm O'er Young to Marry Yet; Scots Wha Hae; Home Sweet Home. Ballade; Ye Banks and Braes; Auld Robin Gray & The Boatie Rows.
- Chopinesque, performed by Rosemary Tuck, partially with Richard Bonynge (pianos), partly with Tait Chamber Orchestra, on: Naxos 8.572776, CD (2012). Contains: Polonaise de Wilna; Nocturne mélodique; La Sympathie. Valse; Le Zéphir. Nocturne; Souvenir de Cracovie. Mazourka; Woodland Murmurs. Nocturne; Le Chant des oiseaux. Nocturne; Valse brillante; Au bord de la mer. Nocturne; Varsovie. Mazourka; Three Nocturnes, Op. 20 No. 1; Souvenir de Naples. Barcarolle; La Brunette. Valse brillante de salon; Innocence. Romance; Victoire. Mazourka; La Grace. Nocturne; Grande fantaisie La Cracovienne (orchestrated).

== Bibliography ==
- Arthur Pougin: William Vincent Wallace. Étude biographique et critique (Paris: A. Ikelmer et Cie., 1866).
- Legge, Robin Humphrey (1899). "Wallace, William Vincent" . In Lee, Sidney (ed.). Dictionary of National Biography. Vol. 59. London: Smith, Elder & Co. p. 116-117.
- W.H. Grattan Flood: William Vincent Wallace. A Memoir (Waterford: Waterford News, 1912).
- Robert Phelan: William Vincent Wallace. A Vagabond Composer (Waterford: Celtic Publications, 1994), ISBN 0-9524629-0-7.
- David Grant: "A Reappraisal of W. Vincent Wallace with new Documentary Information on his Death", in: British Music 25 (2003), p. 60–79.
- David Grant: "Wallace, (William) Vincent", in: Dictionary of Irish Biography, ed. James McGuire and James Quinn (Cambridge: Cambridge University Press, 2009), vol 9, p. 716–718.
- Andrew Lamb: William Vincent Wallace. Composer, Virtuoso and Adventurer (West Byfleet, Surrey: Fullers Wood Press, 2012), ISBN 978-0-9524149-7-1.
- Jeremy Dibble: "Wallace, (William) Vincent", in: The Encyclopaedia of Music in Ireland, ed. by Harry White and Barra Boydell (Dublin: UCD Press, 2013), p. 1039–1040.
