= Louisa Pyne =

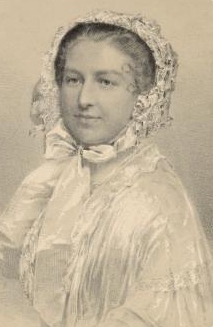
Louisa Pyne from the cover page of "The Louisa Pyne Polka", composed by S. Markstein

Louisa Bodda-Pyne (30 April 1828 – 20 March 1904) was an English soprano and opera company manager.

== Biography ==
=== Life and career ===
Born into a theatrical family as Louisa Fanny Pyne, she was the youngest daughter of the alto George Griggs Pyne (1790–1877). Her elder sister Susanna Pyne (1821–86) was also an accomplished singer and her uncle James Kendrick Pyne (1785–1857) was a tenor whose son and grandson, both named James Kendrick Pyne, were distinguished organists. Her niece, Blanche Whiffen, had a long career in America on stage and later in cinema.

Louisa Pyne was the manager, with the tenor William Harrison, of the Pyne & Harrison Opera Company which toured the Americas in the 1850s. In 1857 she and Harrison founded the Pyne and Harrison English Opera Company at the Lyceum Theatre, London. The company later moved to the Theatre Royal, Drury Lane and, in 1858, under the shortened name of the Royal English Opera, gained a lease at what is now the Royal Opera House in Covent Garden from December 1858 until 1864. The following year, Pyne, along with William Harrison, W. H. Weiss and Madame Weiss, formed a new company under Edward Tyrrel Smith at Astley's Theatre Royal. On 12 October 1868, she married the singer Frank H. Bodda remaining so until his death aged 69 on 14 March 1892.

Louisa Pyne died at her home Cambridge Gardens, North Kensington on 20 March 1904.
