= Aynsley Cook =

British operatic bass-baritone

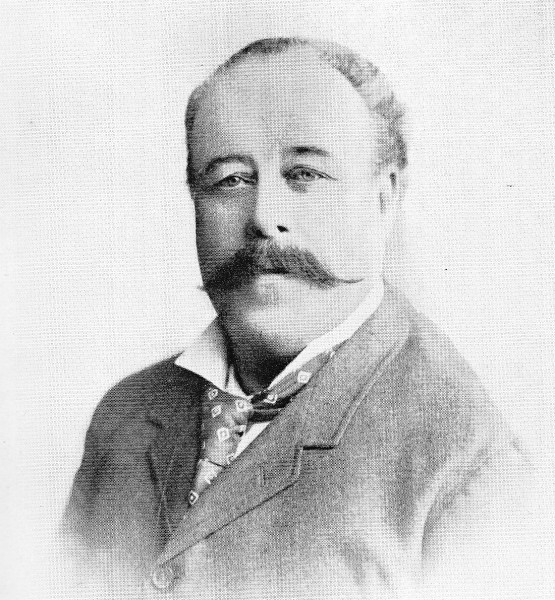
Thomas Aynsley Cook

Thomas Aynsley Cook (1833 – 16 February 1894) was a British operatic bass-baritone of the Victorian era. Among others, he originated the role of José the Wolf in The Contrabandista by Arthur Sullivan and F. C. Burnand in 1867. He sang the role of Devilshoof in The Bohemian Girl, about 430 times.

== Early life ==
Born in London in 1833, Cook was the son of Elizabeth Jane Cook and Thomas Aynsley Cook, a seal and silver engraver, and the brother of opera singers Furneaux Cook and Alice Aynsley Cook (1849–1938). His father claimed descent from Captain James Cook. A boy soprano, Cook started singing at St. George's Catholic Cathedral in Southwark, and at concerts directed by Mendelssohn and Spohr. He was a pupil of Edward John Hopkins at the City Temple in London, and of Josef Staudigl in Munich, Bavaria, and began his singing career in Bavaria. Returning to London, in 1856 he was working for Meyer Lutz, then a professor or teacher of music, in Binfield House, a Wesleyan chapel. In the same year Lutz married Cook's sister, Elizabeth Cook (b. 1835) and later married their sister Emily Cook (b. 1847).

== Operatic career ==
A bass-baritone, Cook made his stage début in Manchester later in 1856 when he appeared with the National English Opera Company managed by Lucy Escott. He may have met his future wife at this time, as she was a member of the same company. On 26 June 1858, Cook married the opera singer Harriett Farrell Payne (1830–1880), the daughter of the pantomime artist William Payne. Her brothers were the pantomime entertainers the Payne Brothers. From 1858 to 1861 Cook and his new wife toured the United States with the Lucy Escott company, but the venture was not a success.

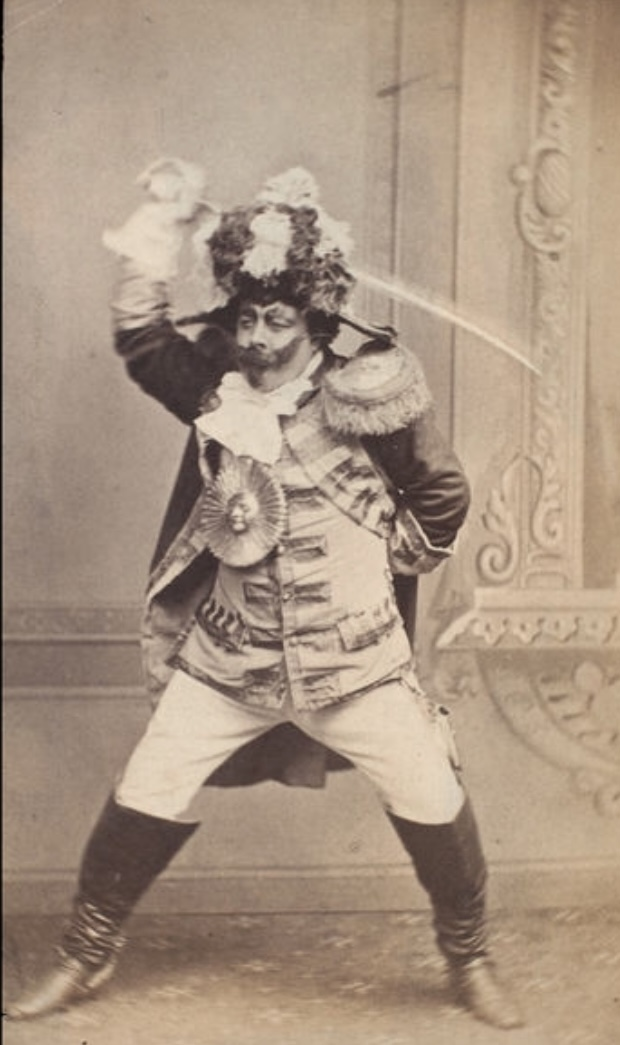
Cook as General Boum in The Grand Duchess of Gerolstein (1867)

From 1862 to 1864 Cook and his wife were members of the Pyne-Harrison Company which was appearing at the Royal Opera House in Covent Garden. For them he sang Sergeant Peterman in The Desert Flower and Pascal in The Armourer of Nantes, both in 1863, and in John Liptrot Hatton's Rose, or Love's Ransom (1864). The couple remained at Covent Garden for a further two years with English Opera Limited. Their repertoire during this period included new works by Balfe, Wallace and Benedict, as well as popular European works translated into English. In 1867 Cook originated the role of José the Wolf in The Contrabandista by Arthur Sullivan and F. C. Burnand at St. George's Hall, in London. He played General Boum in the first British production of The Grand Duchess of Gerolstein in November 1867 at Covent Garden in an English translation by Charles Lamb Kenney, starring Julia Matthews in the title role. During the 1870 to 1871 seasons Cook was at the Gaiety Theatre in London, where he appeared as Van Bett in the British premiere of Lortzing's Zar und Zimmermann in addition to popular French works including Auber's Fra Diavolo and Hérold's Zampa.

== Carl Rosa Opera Company ==
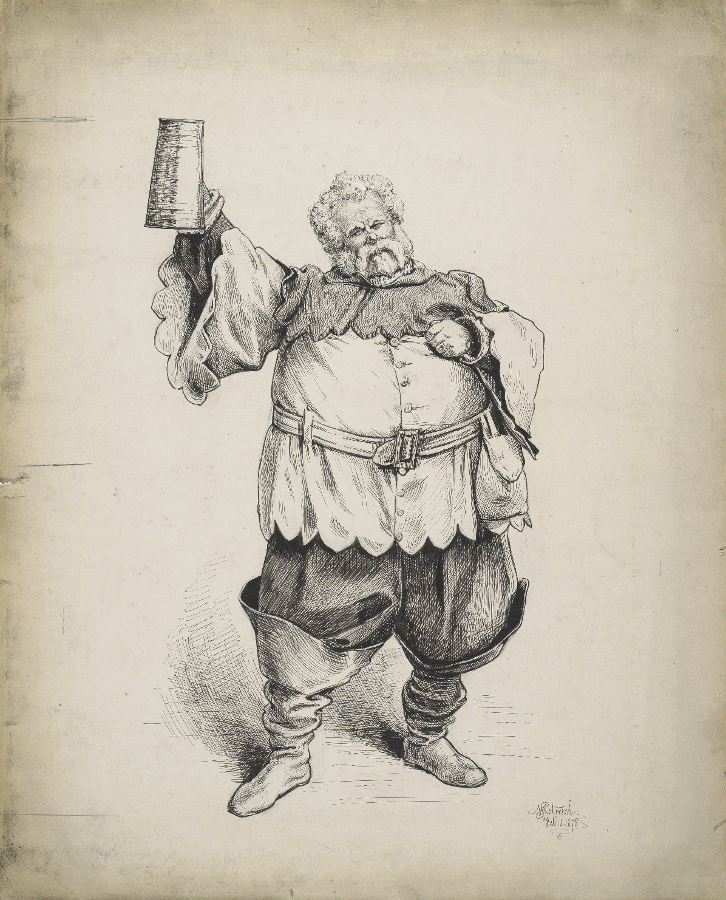
Cook as Falstaff in The Merry Wives of Windsor (1878)

On joining the Carl Rosa Opera Company for their second American season in 1871 the Cooks made their first appearance with the company in The Daughter of the Regiment on 2 October 1871 at the New York Academy of Music with Aynsley as Sulpice, Harriett as the Marchioness and Euphrosyne Parepa-Rosa as Marie. The Cooks remained with Carl Rosa for the next four seasons, until 1878. In 1875 at the Princess's Theatre, London, he sang Bartolo to the Figaro of Charles Santley in The Marriage of Figaro. In 1878 he again sang Falstaff in The Merry Wives of Windsor.

For a while the Cooks managed the pub Jack Straw's Castle on Hampstead Heath. During this period, including after the death of his wife in 1880, Cook sang with other companies. In September and October 1879 Cook played Dick Deadeye in H.M.S. Pinafore with the D'Oyly Carte Opera Company's "2nd London" company in Shoreditch and Camden Town. He rejoined Carl Rosa in 1885 and remained with them for the next decade. Cook sang a variety of roles including Halvor the innkeeper in Corder's grand opera Nordisa (1887). His most famous role with Carl Rosa was Devilshoof in The Bohemian Girl, which he sang about 430 times. While with Carl Rosa Cook sang in Rossini's Stabat Mater in a charity concert to raise funds to restore St Mary's Roman Catholic Cathedral in Edinburgh. This was possibly that work's Scottish premiere.

Cook's last performance was as Father Tom in The Lily of Killarney at the Royal Court Theatre in Liverpool on 3 February 1894. He grew increasingly ill and died on 16 February 1894 as a result of a severe attack of jaundice. His funeral service was held at Saint Peter's church in Liverpool on 20 February, following which thousands of well-wishers attended the interment in the Roman Catholic Ground at Liverpool Cemetery. In tribute, that evening at the Royal Court Theatre Claude Jaquinot conducted Chopin's Funeral March after a performance of Maritana.

== Family ==
His daughter Annie Elizabeth Cook (1861–1946) was born in Boston, Massachusetts, at the outbreak of the American Civil War, while her parents were on an operatic tour. She married the conductor Eugene Goossens, fils, making Cook the maternal grandfather of the talented Goossens siblings, the composer and conductor Sir Eugene Goossens, the harpists Marie and Sidonie Goossens, the horn player Adolphe Goossens and the oboist Léon Goossens.
