= The Armourer of Nantes =

- Opera by Michael William Balfe
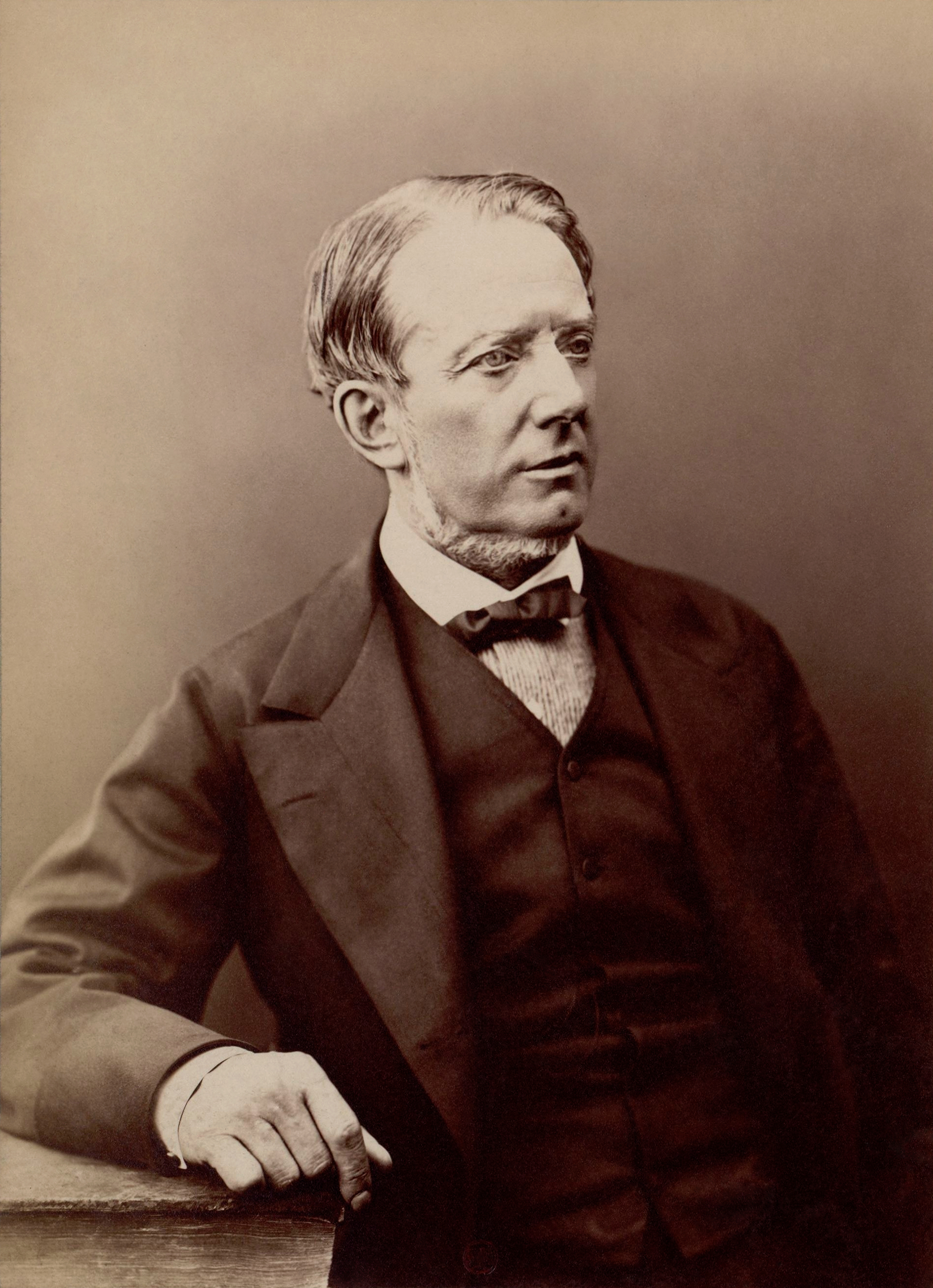
- The composer
- Librettist: J. V. Bridgman
- Language: English
- Based on: Marie Tudor by Victor Hugo
- Premiere: 12 February 1863; Royal Opera House, London

The Armourer of Nantes is an opera in three acts, with music by Michael William Balfe and libretto by J. V. Bridgman. The opera is based on Victor Hugo's 1833 play Marie Tudor and set in Nantes, France, in 1498. The opera was first produced at Covent Garden, under the management of Louisa Pyne and William Harrison, on 12 February 1863.

== Roles ==
Role	Voice type	Premiere Cast (Conductor: Alfred Mellon)
The Baron de Villefranche (envoy of Louis XII of France)	bass	W. H. Weiss
Fabio Fabiani, Count de Beauvoir	baritone	Charles Santley
Raoul, the Armourer	tenor	William Harrison
The Count de Moulac		Mr. Goodwin
The Count de St. Breux		Mr. James
M. de Ploërchartel		Mr. Price
M. de Coëtquen		Charles Lyall
A Jew	baritone	H. Corel
Pascal (a Gaoler)	bass	Mr. Aynsley Cook
Marie (an Orphan)	soprano	Louisa Pyne
Anne, Duchess of Brittany	soprano	Anna Hiles
Dame Bertha		Mrs. Aynsley Cook

== Synopsis ==
The people of Brittany, in 1498, love Duchess Anne, who favors a dashing adventurer, Fabio Fabiani. The nobility envies this relationship, and the favor granted by the Duchess to Fabio, and they conspire against her, together with the French Ambassador. Raoul, an armourer from Nantes, has raised an orphan girl, Marie, who was mysteriously entrusted to him as an infant, and he has fallen in love with her. She turns out to be the heiress of a wealthy Breton noble. Fabio learns of this and kills the Jew who has the papers proving Marie's parentage, but not before Raoul finds out the truth. Fabio accuses Raoul of the murder, and taunts him with a letter from Marie. The Duchess learns of Fabio's crime, and eventually he is executed. Raoul and Marie reunited.

== Reception ==
The reviewer in The Spectator noted that it was Balfe's most successful work among his recent operas, and predicted a successful run. He praised in particular many of its ballads as being among the best that Balfe composed, though he also stated that the subject required a "rather more dramatic treatment than Mr. Balfe is capable of." Charles Lamb Kenney wrote that "there was not the same bright freshness and marked originality in their melodic inspiration taken as a whole."

The opera has never been recorded.
