= Marie Tudor =

Marie Tudor is an 1833 play by the French writer Victor Hugo. It is a historical work portraying the rise, fall and execution of Fabiano Fabiani, a fictional favourite of Mary I of England (1516–1558). Mary has Fabiani thrown in the Tower of London and despite later wishing to spare his life, is unable to do so. This was an influence on Oscar Wilde's later The Duchess of Padua.

== Adaptations ==
The play was adapted into an opera at least twice. J. V. Bridgeman adapted it in English for Balfe's The Armourer of Nantes (1863). Emilio Praga adapted it in Italian for Maria Tudor (1879) composed by Antônio Carlos Gomes.

The play has also been made into films. In 1912 Albert Capellani directed Marie Tudor, a silent film version of the play. A 1966 French television film Marie Tudor was also made, directed by Abel Gance. There was a 1977 German film, "Die Liebe und die Königin". A 1911 Italian film, Mary Tudor, might also have been based on the play.

== Bibliography ==
- Kohl, Norbert. Oscar Wilde: The Works of a Conformist Rebel. Cambridge University Press, 2011.
- Parrill, Sue & Robison, William B. The Tudors on Film and Television. McFarland, 2013.
