= Contrabandista =

Contraband is any illegal item or items being sold on the black market.

Contrabandista, being the Portuguese, Spanish or Spanglish version of the archaic English term Contrabandist, is defined as anyone who carries contraband traffic, and may refer to:

== Contraband meanings ==
- Smuggler
- Gunrunner
- Bootlegger
- Drug dealer

== Arts and entertainment ==
- The Contrabandista, an 1867 comic opera by Arthur Sullivan and F. C. Burnand
