= Charles Lamb Kenney =

Journalist, dramatist and writer

Charles Lamb Kenney (29 April 1821 – 25 August 1881) was a journalist, dramatist and writer.

He was the second son of the dramatist James Kenney.

After working as a clerk in the General Post Office in London, he joined the staff of The Times, to which paper he contributed dramatic criticism. In 1856, having been called to the bar, he became secretary to Ferdinand de Lesseps, and in 1857 he published The Gates of the East in support of the projected construction of the Suez Canal.

Kenney wrote the words for a number of light operas, and was the author of several popular songs, the best known of which were "Soft and Low" (1865) and "The Vagabond" (1871). He also published a Memoir of M. W. Balfe (1875), and translated the Correspondence of Balzac. He included Thackeray and Dickens among his friends in a literary côterie in which he enjoyed the reputation of a wit and an accomplished writer of vers de société.

Kenney died in 1881 and is buried in Brompton Cemetery, London.

== Sources ==
- Author and Bookinfo.com
