= Falstaff (Balfe) =

1838 opera by Michael William Balfe with libretto by Manfredo Maggioni

- Opera by Michael William Balfe
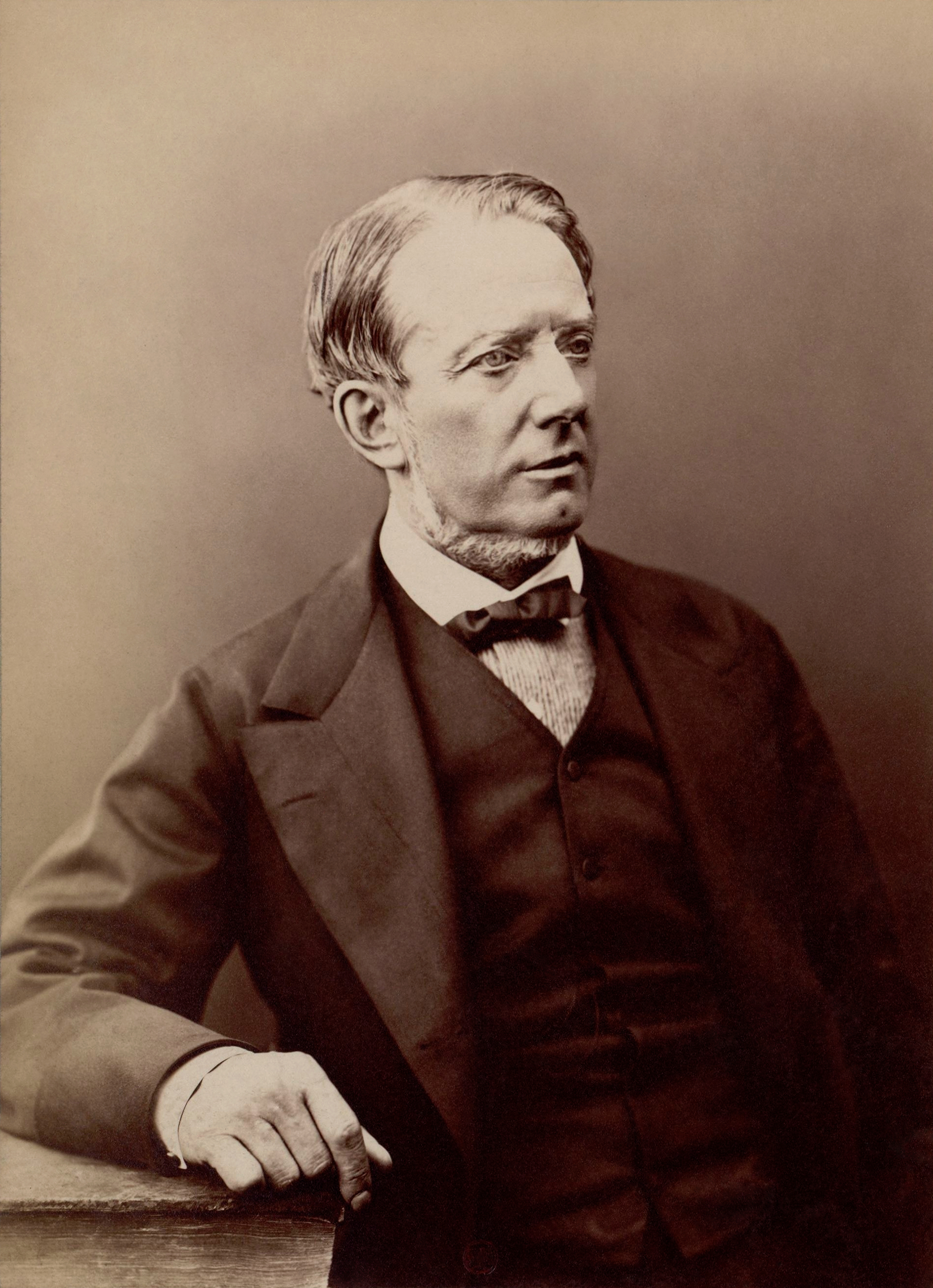
- Librettist: Manfredo Maggioni
- Premiere: 19 July 1838; Her Majesty's Theatre, London

Falstaff is an Italian-language opera by Michael William Balfe, written to a libretto by Manfredo Maggioni, given at Her Majesty's Theatre, London, 19 July 1838.

== Recordings ==
- Falstaff: Marcel Vanaud (Falstaff), Majella Cullagh (Mistress Ford), Sam McElroy (Ford), Barry Banks (Fenton), Tara Erraught (Annetta), Nyle Wolfe (Mr Page), Victoria Massey (Mrs Page), Brendan Collins (Giorgio), Edel O'Brien (Mrs Quickly); RTÉ Concert Orchestra, National Chamber Choir of Ireland, conducted by Marco Zambelli, in association with Opera Ireland for RTÉ; available on CD: RTÉ lyric fm CD 119 (2012).
