= The Contrabandista =

1867 comic opera by Arthur Sullivan and F. C. Burnand

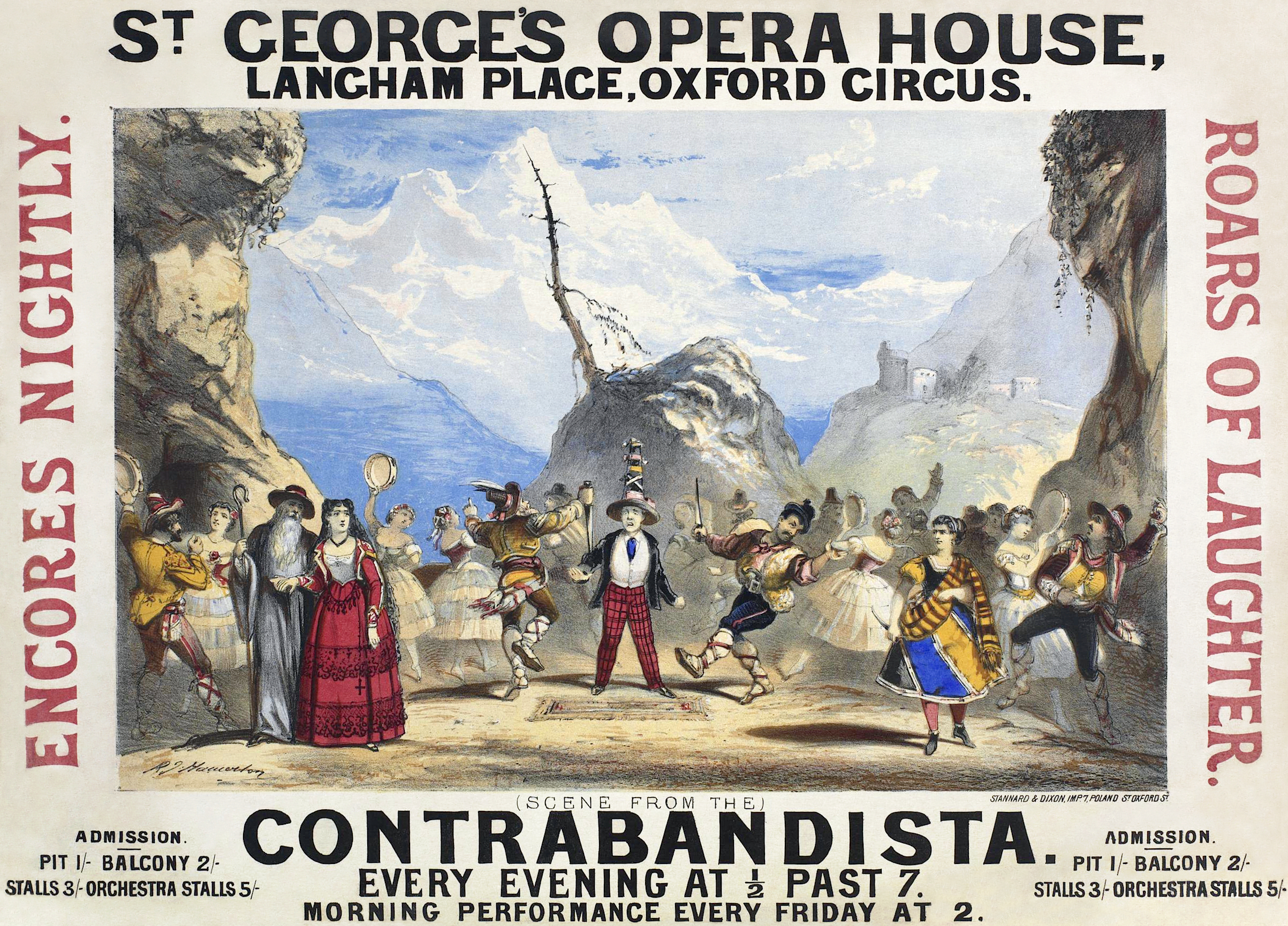
Poster for The Contrabandista

The Contrabandista, or The Law of the Ladrones, is a two-act comic opera by Arthur Sullivan and F. C. Burnand. It premiered at St. George's Hall, in London, on 18 December 1867 under the management of Thomas German Reed, for a run of 72 performances. There were brief revivals in Manchester in 1874 and America in 1880. In 1894, it was revised into a new opera, The Chieftain, with a completely different second act.

The piece was the first of Sullivan's full-length operas that was produced. It was not a great success, with Burnand's libretto receiving criticism, but its music exhibits many of the qualities and techniques that Sullivan would employ in composing his twenty further comic operas, including the famous series of fourteen Gilbert and Sullivan operas produced between 1871 and 1896.

== Background ==
In 1866, F. C. Burnand and Arthur Sullivan, then 24 years old, wrote the one-act comic opera Cox and Box for a private performance at Moray Lodge, where a group of friends called the "Moray Minstrels" gathered regularly. The success of the performance led to productions for charity at the Adelphi Theatre, at Thomas German Reed's Gallery of Illustration (where it would enjoy a long run in 1869), and elsewhere. Burnand had been a pioneer in Britain in the 1860s by collaborating on the creation of comic operas with original scores similar to Jacques Offenbach's highly successful French operettas, which had been a sensation in Paris beginning in the 1850s but were just becoming known in London. This was a departure from the burlesque style of musical theatre that was then popular in Britain, which used musical scores compiled from existing operas, popular songs, music hall and classical music.

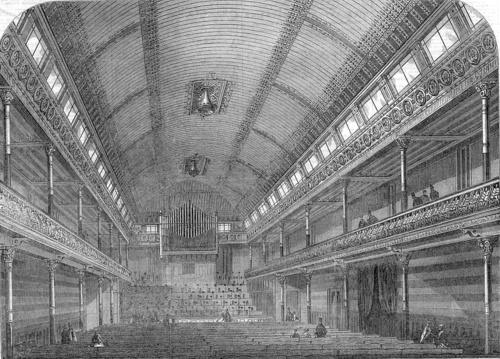
St. George's Hall in 1867

Buoyed by the success of Cox and Box, Reed commissioned a two-act opera from Burnand, The Contrabandista, with original music by Sullivan, to open his new St George's Opera House, together with adaptations of two short Offenbach pieces, Ba-ta-clan (as Ching-Chow-Hi) and La Chatte métamorphosée en femme (as Puss in Petticoats).

== Productions and The Chieftain ==
The Contrabandista was Sullivan's first produced full-length opera. Although it was not a great success, it initially received some favourable notices. The Musical Times wrote: "The excellent vein of humour so apparent in [Cox and Box], as well as in the more important Contrabandista, justifies us in the hope that Mr. Sullivan may give us, at no distant date, a real comic opera of native manufacture." Sullivan's next operatic effort did not come until Thespis, in 1871, with a libretto by W. S. Gilbert, which was followed by another 13 collaborations between Gilbert and Sullivan. The Contrabandista was revived in Manchester in 1874 and was given a production in America in 1880. The first-known amateur performance of The Contrabandista was produced by The Davenport Musical Club in Cincinnati, Ohio, on 4 February 1875 at St. Thoms' Hall.

In 1894, when Richard D'Oyly Carte needed a successor to fill the Savoy Theatre after the closing of Gilbert and Sullivan's Utopia Limited, he commissioned Burnand and Sullivan to revise The Contrabandista. The result was The Chieftain, consisting of a slightly revised and expanded first act and a new second act. It was not successful, and The Chieftain closed after just three months.

The Contrabandista was hardly ever performed in the 20th century. The Comic Opera Guild in the US and Fulham Light Operatic Society in the UK each produced the piece in 1972. A professional concert of the opera was given in 2002 at Cheltenham, England, at the Sir Arthur Sullivan Society Festival, with professional soloists and the Cotswold Savoyards. The opera has been seen at the International Gilbert and Sullivan Festival, most recently in 2012 in an updated staging by Glitter & Twisted Theatre Company, which also presented it in Cheltenham. A professional recording by Hyperion Records in 2004 revived some interest in the work. Reviewing the 2004 Hyperion recording, Raymond Walker wrote: "Despite a mundane book about Spanish brigands by Frances Burnand (who would later become Editor of Punch) there are good musical ideas in The Contrabandista. These anticipate the more mature Sullivan of Gilbert & Sullivan fame. In The Contrabandista, Sullivan attempts a good variety of musical styles. At times these are more reminiscent of Offenbach than the German and Italian operatic masters that Sullivan is likened to." Sullivan repeated several of the musical ideas that give The Contrabandista a Spanish flavour many years later in The Gondoliers (1888). The whereabouts of the composer's autograph score were not publicly known until Terence Rees purchased it at auction in 1966.

== Roles and original cast ==
- Sancho the Lion (1st Lieutenant of the Ladrones) bass-baritone – Mr. Neilson
- José the Wolf (2nd Lieutenant of the Ladrones) baritone – Aynsley Cook
- Inez de Roxas (Chieftainess of the Ladrones) contralto – Lucy Franklein
- Rita (an English lady engaged to Count Vasquez) soprano – Arabella Smyth
- Count Vasquez de Gonzago (Captain of the Guard) tenor – Edgar Hargrave
- Mr. Peter Adolphus Grigg (a British tourist in search of the picturesque) comic baritone – John Alexander Shaw
- A Spanish Officer baritone

== Synopsis ==
=== Act I ===
The action takes place in the mountains of Spain between Compostello and Seville. Inez de Roxas is queen of a gang of bandits, the Ladrones. Their Captain, Ferdinand de Roxas, has been dead for three weeks, and the band cannot agree which of the brigand lieutenants, José or Sancho, should replace him. The Law of the Ladrones holds that when two candidates for Chief have an equal number of votes, then the first foreigner who comes along will be made their leader and Inez's new husband. The Ladrones have abducted Rita, a young lady. In retaliation for her kidnapping, her betrothed, Count Vasquez, fought and killed de Roxas. The Ladrones see a goatherd (actually Vasquez in disguise) and his son on their way home. Inez orders the boy to take a ransom note to Vasquez and presses the old goatherd into service to guard their prisoner, Rita. The goatherd mentions that he has seen a stranger that day. The Ladrones wonder if this could be their new captain sent by fate. Vasquez eventually finds a moment to reveal his identity to Rita.

Adolphus Cimabue Grigg, an English tourist and amateur photographer, enters in search of pretty scenery, but he is lost and finds travelling with his heavy photographic gear difficult. He vows, upon his return to England, to become a farmer and lead a life of happy domesticity. Sancho and José stop him, identify themselves as bandits, and tell Grigg that he must be their new Captain of the Ladrones (or be shot). They force him to dance the Bolero and tell him that he will have to marry Inez. Grigg, who is already married, objects, as he does not want to commit bigamy. He is happy that the wedding will not take place for four days. Grigg is formally betrothed to Inez and is ritually installed as Captain of the Ladrones by means of placing the Sacred Hat upon his head. Meanwhile, José and Inez begin to formulate a plot to get rid of Grigg and Sancho, while all celebrate.

=== Act II ===
The next morning, Vasquez slips out. Sancho is on guard duty, but tired from the night's festivities, he falls asleep. Inez confirms to José that she is unhappy at the prospect of marrying Grigg. José explains the plan: Inez will persuade Grigg to kill Sancho; then the angry brigands will murder Grigg in retaliation, leaving her free to marry José, who will become captain. Sancho wakes up and overhears this conversation but pretends to be asleep. Meanwhile, Rita hopes that Vasquez will return soon to rescue her.

Sancho tells Grigg about the plot and hides as Inez and José arrive. They tell Grigg that Inez wants blood, and that the new Captain must be daring: he must bring her Sancho's head according to the Law of the Ladrones. They suggest that he take a drink to inspire him. When they step away, Sancho announces that he is quitting the Ladrone band and runs off, leaving Grigg to face the wrath of the Ladrones. Grigg fabricates a tale of shooting and stabbing Sancho as he fled, but he says that he could not stop Sancho from escaping. Inez and José prepare to light a fuse leading to a store of dynamite that their late Captain had laid in case of a surprise, as it is the Law of the Ladrones that they must all perish together. Before doing so, however, they decide to kill Rita to avenge the late Captain's death.

Rita pleads with Grigg to save her life. Grigg, fearful at first, decides that, as an Englishman, he must be bold to save a female in distress. He offers Rita a pistol, saying "come on"! Vasquez, now in military uniform, bursts in with a Spanish officer. The officer announces that all of the Ladrones have been pardoned, except for their Captain. He moves to seize Grigg, but Vasquez assures him that Grigg is innocent. All the Ladrones decide to join the army, and Rita is free to marry Vasquez. Everyone dances and sings.

== Musical numbers ==
Act I

- 1. "Hush! Not a Step" (Sancho, Jose & Chorus)
- 1a. "Let Others Seek the Peaceful Plain!" (Inez)
- 2. "Hand of Fate!" (Jose, Vasquez, Sancho, Inez & Rita)
- 3. "Only the Night-Wind Sighs Alone" (Rita)
- 4. "A Guard by Night" (Vasquez & Rita)
- 5. "From Rock to Rock" (Mr. Grigg)
- 6. "Hullo! What's That?" (Grigg, Sancho & Jose)
- 7. "Bolero" (Grigg, Sancho & Jose)
- 8. Finale Act I: "Hail to the Ancient Hat!"

Act II

- 9. "Wake, Gentle Maiden" (Vasquez)
- 10. "Let Hidalgos Be Proud of Their Breed" (Inez & Jose)
- 11. "My Love, We’ll Meet Again" (Rita)
- 12. "Who’d to Be Robber-Chief Aspire?" (Inez, Jose & Grigg)
- 13. "I Fired Each Barrel" (Grigg)
- 14. Finale Act II: "Have Pity, Sir!"
