= Michael William Balfe =

Irish composer (1808–1870)

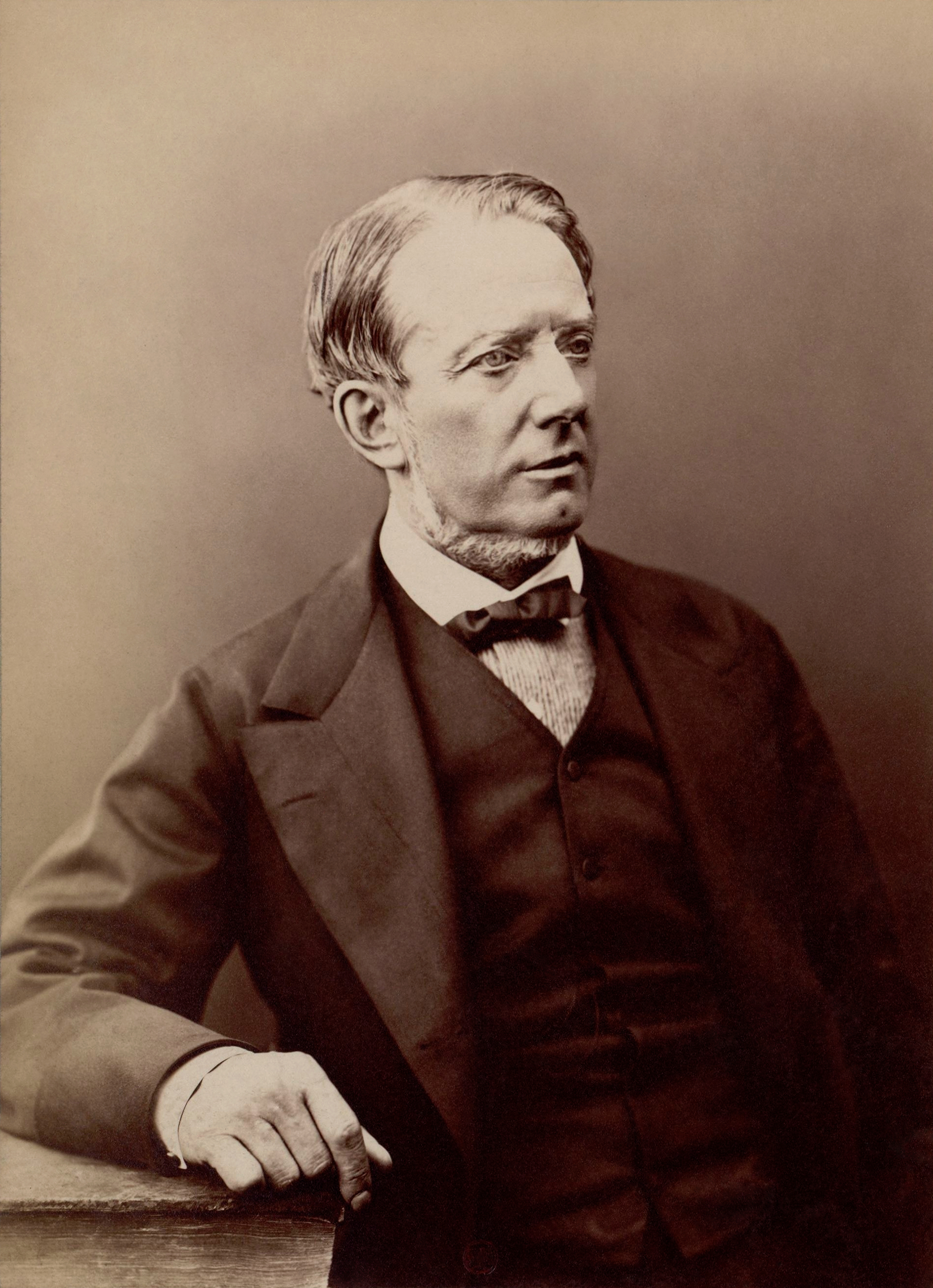
Balfe as photographed by Nadar

Michael William Balfe (15 May 1808 – 20 October 1870) was an Irish composer, best remembered for his operas, especially The Bohemian Girl.

After a short career as a violinist, Balfe pursued an operatic singing career, while he began to compose. In a career spanning more than 40 years, he composed at least 29 operas, almost 250 songs, several cantatas and other works. He was also a noted conductor, directing Italian Opera at Her Majesty's Theatre for seven years, among other conducting posts.

== Biography ==
=== Early life and career ===
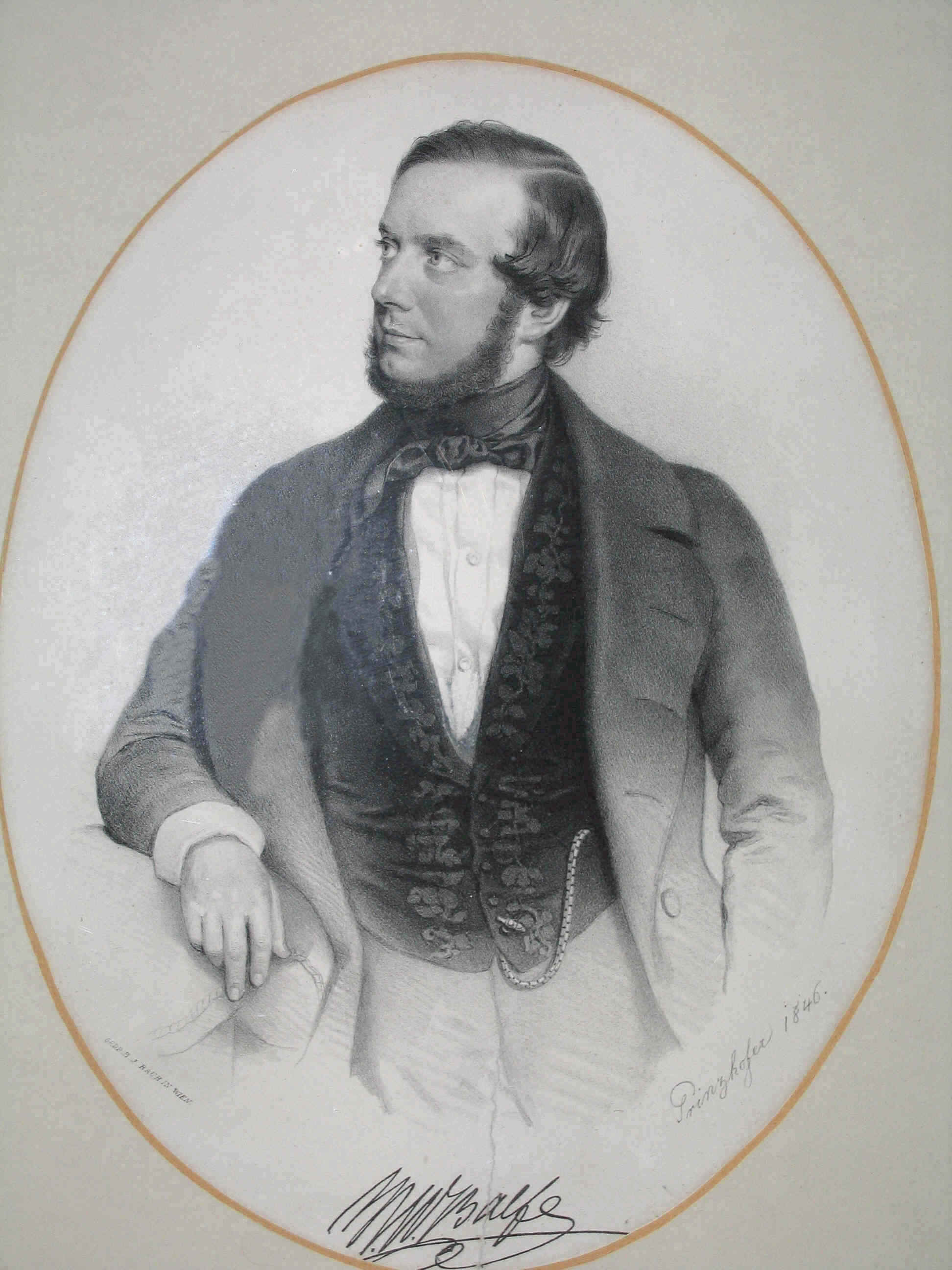
Balfe in 1846

Balfe was born in Dublin and grew up on Pitt Street, which was renamed Balfe Street in 1917 in his honour. His musical gifts became apparent at an early age, and he received instruction from his father, a dancing master and violinist, and from the composer William Rooke. Balfe's family moved to Wexford when he was a child. Between 1814 and 1815, Balfe played the violin for his father's dancing-classes, and at the age of seven composed a polacca.

In 1817, he appeared as a violinist in public, and in this year composed a ballad, first called "Young Fanny" and afterwards, when sung in Paul Pry by Madame Vestris, "The Lovers' Mistake". In 1823, upon his father's death, the teenaged Balfe moved to London and was engaged as a violinist in the orchestra of the Theatre Royal, Drury Lane. He eventually became the leader of that orchestra. While there, he studied violin with Charles Edward Horn and composition with Charles Frederick Horn, the organist, from 1824, at St George's Chapel, Windsor Castle.

While still playing the violin, Balfe pursued a career as an opera singer. He debuted unsuccessfully at Norwich in Carl Maria von Weber's Der Freischütz. In 1825, his wealthy patron Count Mazzara took him to Rome for vocal and musical studies and introduced him to Luigi Cherubini. Balfe also pursued composing: in Italy, he wrote his first dramatic work, a ballet, La Perouse. He became a protégé of Rossini's, and at the close of 1827, he appeared as Figaro in The Barber of Seville at the Italian opera in Paris.

Balfe soon returned to Italy, where he was based for the next eight years, singing and composing several operas. He met Maria Malibran while singing at the Paris Opera during this period. In 1829 in Bologna, Balfe composed his first cantata for the soprano Giulia Grisi, then 18 years old. She performed it with the tenor Francesco Pedrazzi with much success. Balfe produced his first complete opera, I rivali di se stessi, at Palermo in the carnival season of 1829–30.

In Lugano, Switzerland, around 1831, he married Lina Roser (1806–1888), a Hungarian-born singer of Austrian parentage whom he had met at Bergamo. The couple had two sons and two daughters. Their younger son, Edward, died in infancy. Their elder son, Michael William Jr., died in 1915. Their daughters were Louisa (1832–1869) and Victoire. Balfe wrote another opera, Un avvertimento ai gelosi, at Pavia, and Enrico Quarto at Milan, where he had been engaged to sing in Rossini's Otello with Malibran at La Scala in 1834. An unpopular attempt at "improving" Giacomo Meyerbeer's opera Il crociato in Egitto by interpolating music of his own compelled Balfe to throw up his engagement at the theatre La Fenice in Venice.

=== Composing success ===
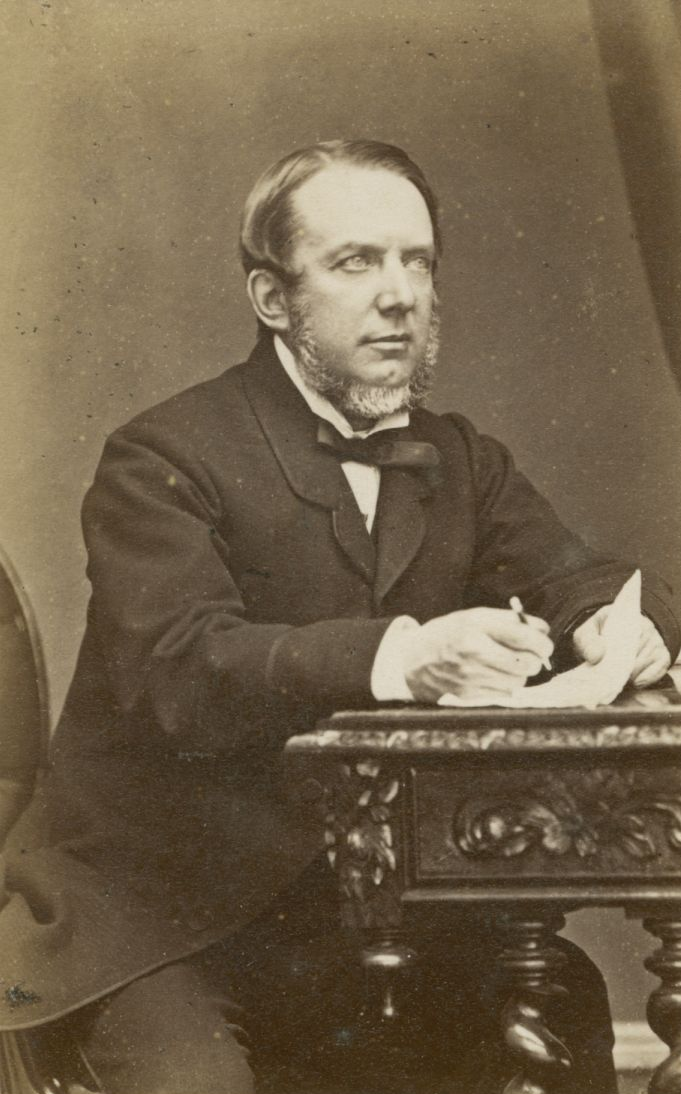
Balfe in London

Balfe returned to London with his wife and young daughter in May 1835. His initial success took place some months later, with the premiere of The Siege of Rochelle on 29 October 1835 at Drury Lane. Encouraged by his success, in 1836 he produced The Maid of Artois, which was followed by more operas in English.

In July 1838, Balfe composed a new opera, Falstaff, for The Italian Opera House, based on The Merry Wives of Windsor, with an Italian libretto by S. Manfredo Maggione. The production starred his friends Luigi Lablache (bass) in the title role, Giulia Grisi (soprano), Giovanni Battista Rubini (tenor), and Antonio Tamburini (baritone). The same four singers had premiered Bellini's I puritani at the Italian Opera in Paris in 1835.

In 1841, Balfe founded the National Opera at the Lyceum Theatre, but the venture was a failure. The same year, he premiered his opera Keolanthe. He then moved to Paris, presenting Le Puits d'amour (1843) in early 1843, followed by his opera based on Les quatre fils Aymon (1844) for the Opéra-Comique (also popular in German-speaking countries for many years as Die vier Haimonskinder) and L'étoile de Seville (1845) for the Opéra. Their libretti were by Eugène Scribe and others. Meanwhile, in 1843, Balfe returned to London, where he produced his most successful work, The Bohemian Girl, on 27 November 1843 at the Theatre Royal, Drury Lane. The piece ran for over 100 nights, and productions were soon mounted in New York, Dublin, Philadelphia, Vienna (in German), Sydney, and throughout Europe and elsewhere. In 1854, an Italian adaptation called La Zingara was mounted in Trieste with great success, and it too was performed internationally in both Italian and German. In 1862, a four-act French version titled La Bohemienne was produced in France and was also a success.

=== Later years ===
From 1846 to 1852, Balfe was appointed musical director and principal conductor for the Italian Opera at Her Majesty's Theatre, with Max Maretzek as his assistant. There he first produced several of Verdi's operas for London audiences. He conducted for Jenny Lind at her opera debut and on many occasions thereafter.

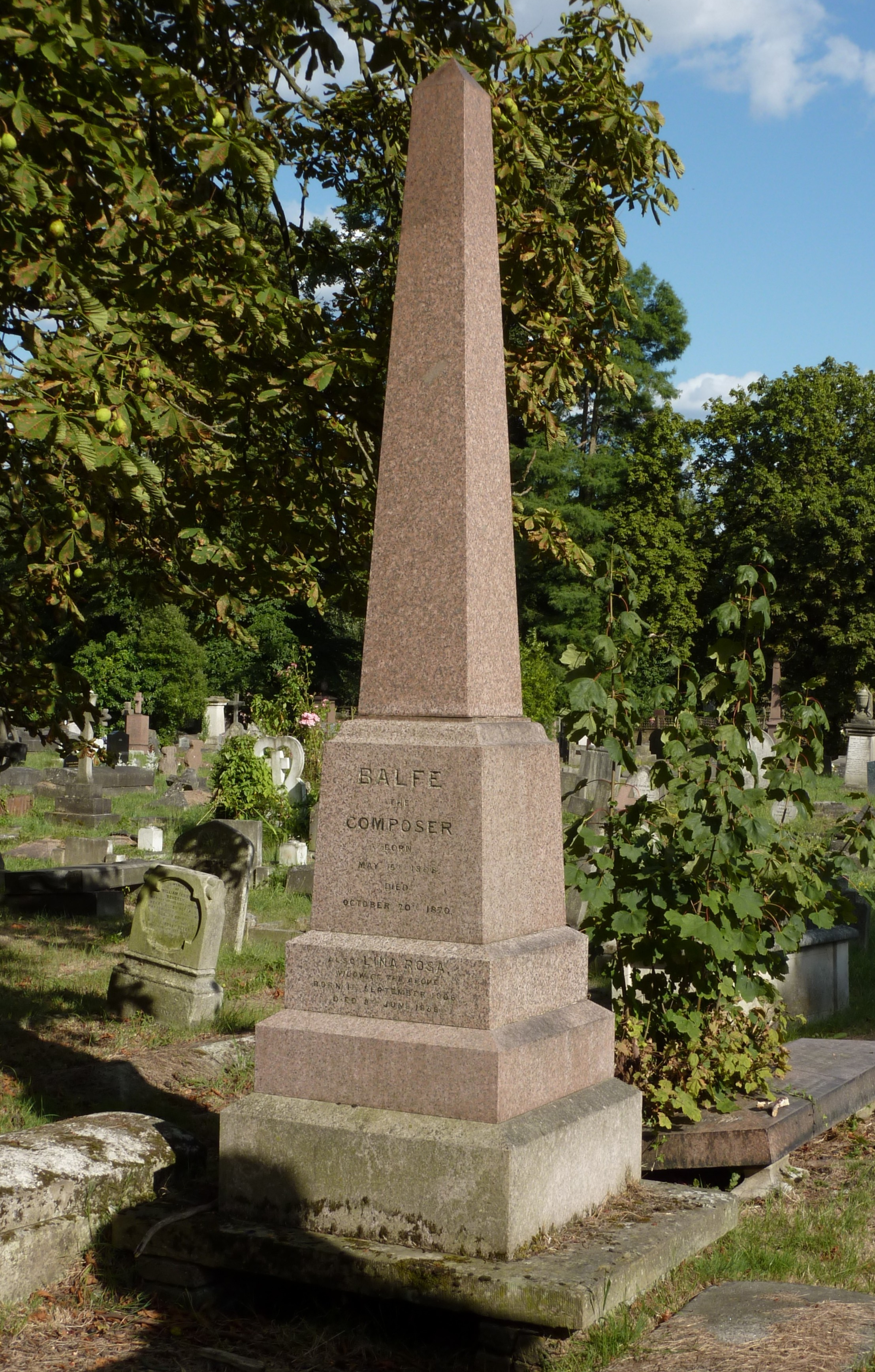
Balfe's funerary monument at Kensal Green Cemetery, London

In 1851, in anticipation of The Great Exhibition in London, Balfe composed an innovative cantata, Inno Delle Nazioni, sung by nine female singers, each representing a country. He continued to compose new operas in English, including The Armourer of Nantes (1863), and wrote hundreds of songs, such as "When Other Hearts", "I Dreamt I Dwelt in Marble Halls" (from The Bohemian Girl), "Come Into the Garden, Maud", "Killarney", and "Excelsior" (a setting of the poem by Longfellow). His last opera, nearly completed when he died, was The Knight of the Leopard and achieved considerable success in Italian as Il Talismano.

Balfe retired in 1864 to Hertfordshire, where he rented a country estate. He died at his home in Rowney Abbey, Ware, Hertfordshire, in 1870, aged 62, and was buried at Kensal Green Cemetery in London, next to fellow Irish composer William Vincent Wallace, who had died five years before. In 1882, a medallion portrait of him was unveiled in Westminster Abbey. A London County Council plaque unveiled in 1912 commemorates Balfe at 12 Seymour Street, Marylebone.

In all, Balfe composed at least 29 operas. He also wrote several cantatas (including Mazeppa in 1862) and a symphony (1829). Balfe's most notable opera, and his only large-scale piece that is still performed is The Bohemian Girl.

== Selected compositions ==
Operas, with first performances

- I rivali di se stessi (A. Alcozer), Palermo: Teatro Carolino, 29 June 1829
- Un avvertimento ai gelosi (G. Foppa), Pavia: Teatro Condomini, 11 May 1831
- Enrico IV al passo della Marna (unknown librettist), Milan: Teatro Carcano, 19 February 1833
- The Siege of Rochelle (Edward Fitzball), London: Theatre Royal Drury Lane, 29 October 1835
  - Austrian version: Die Belagerung von Rochelle (Joseph Kupelwieser), Vienna: Theater an der Wien, 24 October 1846
- The Maid of Artois (Alfred Bunn), London: Theatre Royal Drury Lane, 27 May 1836
- Catherine Grey (George Linley), London: Theatre Royal Drury Lane, 27 May 1837
- Joan of Arc (Edward Fitzball), London: Theatre Royal Drury Lane, 30 November 1837
- Diadeste, or The Veiled Lady (Edward Fitzball), London: Theatre Royal Drury Lane, 17 May 1838
- Falstaff (Manfredo Maggioni), London: Her Majesty's Theatre (Italian Opera), 19 July 1838
- Keolanthe (Edward Fitzball), London Theatre Royal (English Opera House), 9 March 1841
  - Austrian version: Keolanthe, oder Das Traumbild (Karl Gollmick), Vienna: Theater am Kärntnertor, 3 December 1853
- Le Puits d'amour (Eugène Scribe and A. de Leuven), Paris: Opéra Comique, 20 April 1843
  - English version: Geraldine, or The Lover's Well, London: Princess Theatre, 14 August 1843
  - Austrian version: Der Liebesbrunnen (Joseph Kupelwieser), Vienna: Theater an der Wien, 4 November 1845
- The Bohemian Girl (Alfred Bunn), London: Theatre Royal Drury Lane, 27 November 1843
  - Austrian version: Die Zigeunerin (Joseph Kupelwieser), Vienna: Theater an der Wien, 24 July 1846
  - Italian version: La zingara (Riccardo Paderni), Trieste: Teatro Grande, 12 February 1854;
  - French version: La Bohemienne (J.H. Vernoy de Saint Georges), Rouen: Théâtre des Arts, 23 April 1862, conducted by Jules Massenet; revised version: Paris: Théâtre Lyrique, 30 December 1869
- Les Quatre fils Aymon (A. de Leuven and L.L. Brunswick), Paris: Opéra Comique, 15 July 1844
  - English version: The Castle of Aymon (G.A. Beckett), London: Princess Theatre, 20 November 1844
  - Austrian version: Die vier Haimonskinder (Joseph Kupelwieser), Vienna: Josefstadt-Theater, 14 December 1844
  - Italian version (for London): I quattro fratelli (S.F. Maggione), London: His Majesty's Theatre (Italian Opera), 11 August 1851
- The Daughter of St. Mark (Alfred Bunn), London: Theatre Royal Drury Lane, 27 November 1844
- The Enchantress (J.H. Vernoy de Saint Georges), London: Theatre Royal Drury Lane, 14 May 1845
- L'étoile de Seville (Hippolyte Lucas), Paris: Opéra, 17 December 1845
- The Bondman (Alfred Bunn), London: Theatre Royal Drury Lane, 11 December 1846
  - German version: Der Mulatte (Johann Christoph Grünbaum), Berlin: Königliches Schauspielhaus, 25 January 1850
- The Maid of Honour (Edward Fitzball), London: Theatre Royal Drury Lane, 20 December 1847
- The Sicilian Bride (J.H. Vernoy de Saint Georges, transl. by A. Bunn), London: Theatre Royal Drury Lane, 6 March 1852
- The Devil's in it (Alfred Bunn), London: Surrey Theatre, 26 July 1852
- Pittore e Duca (F.M. Piave), Trieste: Teatro Grande, 21 November 1854
  - English version: Moro, the Painter of Antwerp (William Alexander Barrett), London: Her Majesty's Theatre, 28 January 1882
- The Rose of Castille (A. Harris and Edmund Falconer), London: Lyceum Theatre, 29 October 1857
- Satanella, or The Power of Love (A. Harris and Edmund Falconer), London: Royal English Opera Covent Garden, 20 December 1858
- Bianca, the Bravo's Bride (J. Palgrave Simpson), London: Royal English Opera Covent Garden, 6 December 1860
- The Puritan's Daughter (J.V. Bridgeman), London: Royal English Opera Covent Garden, 30 November 1861
- The Armourer of Nantes (J.V. Bridgeman), London: Royal English Opera Covent Garden, 12 February 1863
- Blanche de Nevers (J. Brougham), London: Royal English Opera Covent Garden, 21 November 1863
- The Sleeping Queen (H.B. Farnie), London: Royal Gallery of Illustrations, 31 August 1864
- Il talismano (Arthur Matthison, Italian transl. by Giuseppe Zaffira), London: Theatre Royal Drury Lane, 11 June 1874

== Recordings ==
Recordings of Balfe's work include the following:

- LP recordings (Rare Recorded Editions) of The Siege of Rochelle, The Daughter of St. Mark, The Rose of Castille and Satanella.
- The Bohemian Girl conducted by Richard Bonynge, originally released on the Argo label in 1991, reissued on Decca 473 077-2.
- Deborah Riedel and Richard Bonynge, The Power of Love, Melba Z-MR301082, a CD of Balfe arias.
- The Maid of Artois, Victorian Opera Northwest (2005), available on Cameo 2042-3.
- Victorian Opera Northwest, "Balfe Songs and Arias", CD, WRW 204-2.
- Opera Rara CDs: ORR 239 includes Balfe's cantata Sempre pensoso e torbido, and ORR 277 includes his song The Blighted flower.
- Opera Ireland (2008) live concert of Balfe's Falstaff, RTÉ Concert Orchestra and National Chamber Choir of Ireland, conducted by Marco Zambelli, broadcast by RTÉ Lyric FM and later released on CD as RTÉ LyricFM CD119, available from Naxos.
- A Balfe overture and songs (together with several Sullivan pieces), Forgotten Victorian Theatre Music.
- Balfe's Cello Sonata, Dutton CDLX 7225.
- Satanella, conducted by Richard Bonynge, issued in 2016 on Naxos 8.660378-79

== Sources ==
- Barrett, William Alexander. Balfe. His Life & Work (London: William Reeves, 1882).
- Biddlecombe, George: English Opera from 1834 to 1864 with Particular Reference to the Works of Michael Balfe (New York: Garland Publishing, 1994), ISBN 0-8153-1436-1.
- Burton, Nigel (1998): “Balfe, Michael William” in Stanley Sadie, (Ed.), The New Grove Dictionary of Opera, Vol. One, pp. 286–288. London: Macmillan Publishers, Inc. ISBN 0-333-73432-7 ISBN 1-56159-228-5
- Kenney, Charles Lamb: A Memoir of Michael William Balfe (London: Tinsley Bros., 1875).
- Tyldesley, William. Michael William Balfe. His Life and His English Operas (Aldershot & Burlington, Vermont: Ashgate, 2003), ISBN 0-7546-0558-2.
- Walsh, Basil: Michael W. Balfe. A Unique Victorian Composer (Dublin & Portland, Oregon: Irish Academic Press, 2008), ISBN 978-0-7165-2947-7.
